= Lewis Hamilton =

British racing driver (born 1985)

Sir Lewis Hamilton MBE HonFREng
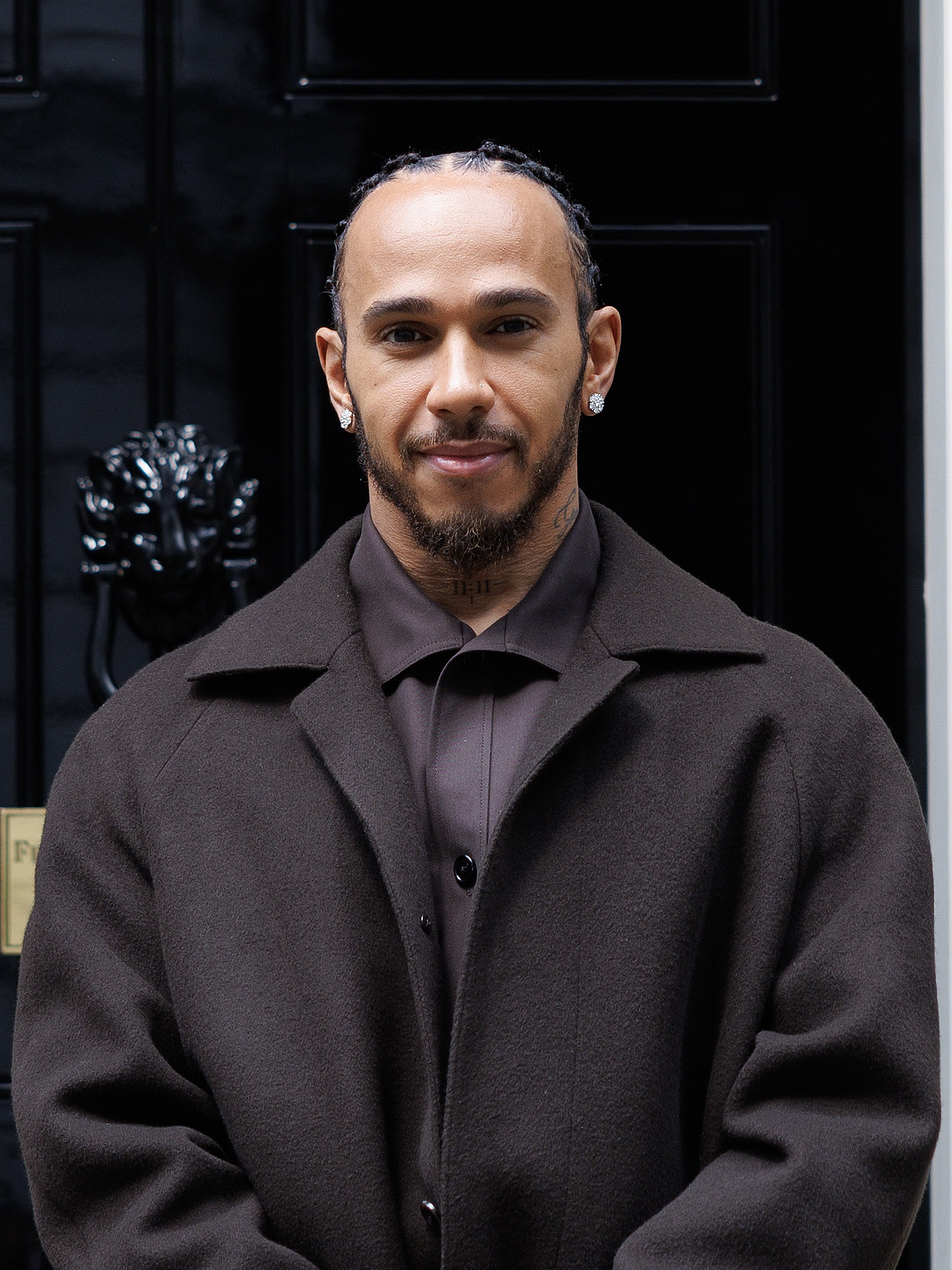
- Hamilton in 2025
- Born: Lewis Carl Davidson Hamilton; 7 January 1985 (age 41); Stevenage, Hertfordshire, England
- Partner: Nicole Scherzinger (2007–2015)
- Relatives: Nicolas Hamilton (half-brother)
- Awards: Full list

Formula One World Championship career
- Nationality: (United Kingdom) British
- 2026 team: Ferrari
- Car number: 44 (Note: Hamilton became the first reigning World Drivers' Champion to decline his right to use the number 1, retaining his personal number 44 from 2014 onwards. He briefly used the number 1 on the nose of his car during free practice for the Abu Dhabi Grand Prix in 2018 and 2019 after winning his fifth and sixth titles, respectively; he was still entered under the number 44, which appeared on the engine cover.)
- Entries: 400 (400 starts)
- Championships: 7 (2008, 2014, 2015, 2017, 2018, 2019, 2020)
- Wins: 106
- Podiums: 209
- Career points: 5279.5
- Pole positions: 105
- Fastest laps: 70
- First entry: 2007 Australian Grand Prix
- First win: 2007 Canadian Grand Prix
- Last win: 2026 Barcelona-Catalunya Grand Prix
- Last entry: 2026 São Paulo Grand Prix
- 2025 position: 6th (156 pts)

Previous series
- 2006; 2004–2005; 2003; 2002–2003; 2002: GP2 Series; F3 Euro Series; British F3; British Formula Renault; Formula Renault Eurocup

Championship titles
- 2006; 2005; 2003: GP2 Series; F3 Euro Series; British Formula Renault
- Website: lewishamilton.com

Signature
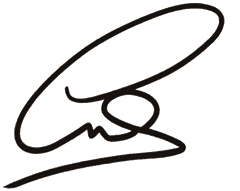

Sir Lewis Carl Davidson Hamilton (born 7 January 1985) is a British racing driver who competes in Formula One for Ferrari. Hamilton has won a joint-record seven Formula One World Drivers' Championship titles—tied with Michael Schumacher—and holds the records for most wins (106), pole positions (105), and podium finishes (209), among others.

Born and raised in Stevenage, Hamilton began his career in karting at age six, winning several national titles and attracting the attention of Ron Dennis, who signed him to the McLaren-Mercedes Young Driver Programme in 1998. After winning the Karting World Cup and European Championship in 2000, Hamilton progressed to junior formulae, where his successes included winning the Formula 3 Euro Series and the GP2 Series. He subsequently signed for McLaren in 2007, becoming the first black driver to compete in Formula One at the Australian Grand Prix. In his rookie season, Hamilton won four Grands Prix and set several records as he finished runner-up to Kimi Räikkönen by one point and tied with his teammate Fernando Alonso. Hamilton won his maiden title in 2008, making a title-deciding overtake on the last lap of the last race of the season to become the then-youngest World Drivers' Champion. The Red Bull–Renault combination prevailed throughout his remaining four seasons at McLaren, with Hamilton achieving multiple race wins in each, including his involvement in a four-way title battle in 2010.

Hamilton signed for Mercedes in 2013 to partner his old karting teammate Nico Rosberg, ending his 15-year association with McLaren. Following his maiden victory with the team at the Hungarian Grand Prix, new engine regulations the following season saw Mercedes emerge as the dominant force in Formula One. Over the next three seasons, Hamilton and Rosberg won 51 of 59 Grands Prix amidst their fierce rivalry, with Hamilton winning the former titles in 2014 and 2015, and Rosberg winning the latter. After Rosberg's retirement, Hamilton twice overturned mid-season point deficits to Sebastian Vettel of Ferrari to claim his fourth and fifth titles in 2017 and 2018. Hamilton won his sixth title in 2019, before breaking several records across his 2020 campaign—including the all-time win record at the Portuguese Grand Prix—to claim his record-equalling seventh. Hamilton became the first driver to surpass 100 race wins and pole positions in 2021, ending runner-up to Max Verstappen amidst a disputed finish. Following winless campaigns in 2022 and 2023, he took his record ninth British Grand Prix victory in 2024, his final season with Mercedes. Hamilton signed for Ferrari in 2025, contracted to remain until at least the end of 2027.

Hamilton has been credited with furthering Formula One's global following by appealing to a broader audience outside the sport, in part due to his high-profile lifestyle, amongst his environmental and social activism. He has also become a prominent advocate in support of racial justice and increased diversity in motorsport. Hamilton was listed in the 2020 issue of Time as one of the 100 most influential people globally, was named the most influential black Briton in the Powerlist 2021, and was knighted by Elizabeth II.

== Early life ==
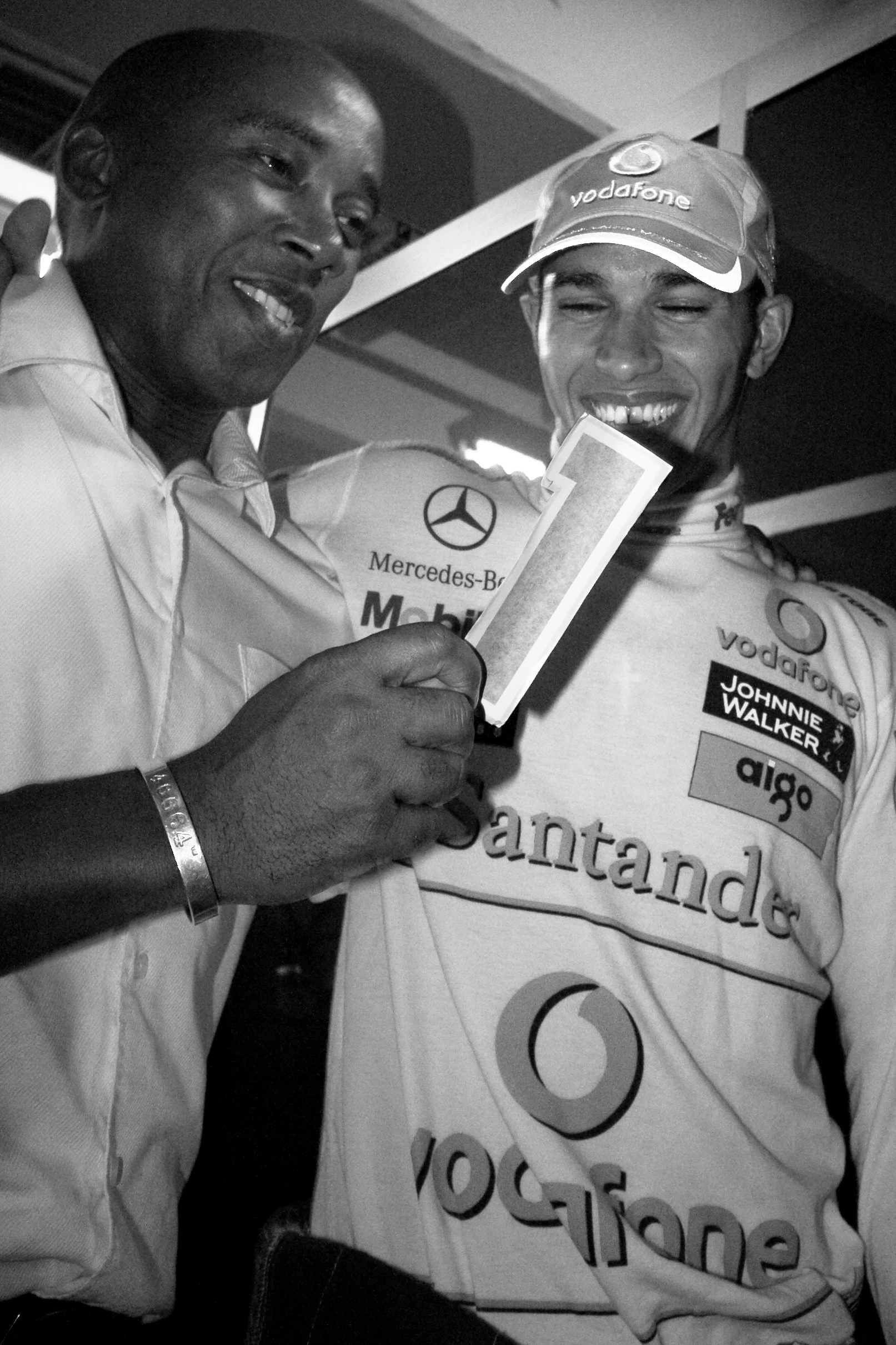
Hamilton celebrating with his father and then-manager Anthony Hamilton after the 2008 Brazilian Grand Prix

Lewis Carl Davidson Hamilton was born on 7 January 1985 in Stevenage, Hertfordshire. His father, Anthony Hamilton, is of Afro-Grenadian descent, while his mother, Carmen Larbalestier, is White British from Birmingham, making him mixed-race. Hamilton's parents separated when he was two, after which he lived with his mother and older half-sisters, Samantha and Nicola, until he was twelve. Hamilton then lived with his father, stepmother Linda, and his half-brother Nicolas, who is also a professional racing driver. Hamilton was raised a Catholic.

Hamilton's father bought him a radio-controlled car when he was five. Hamilton finished second in the national BRCA championship the following year against adult competition. Being the only black child racing at his club, Hamilton was subjected to racist abuse. Hamilton's father bought him a go-kart for Christmas when he was six and promised to support his racing career as long as he worked hard at school. To support his son, Hamilton's father took redundancy from his position as an IT manager and became a contractor, sometimes working up to four jobs at a time including employment as a double glazing salesman, dishwasher, and putting up signs for estate agents, while still attending his son's races. Hamilton's father later set up his own IT company. He continued to be Hamilton's manager until early 2010.

Hamilton was educated at The John Henry Newman School, a voluntary aided Catholic secondary school in Stevenage. Hamilton has said that at the age of five he took up karate to defend himself as a result of bullying at school. He was also excluded from school for a period when he was mistakenly identified as having attacked a fellow student who was treated in hospital for his injuries. In addition to racing, he played association football for his school team with eventual England international, Ashley Young. Hamilton, an Arsenal fan, said that if Formula One had not worked for him, he would have been a footballer or a cricketer, having played both for his school teams. In February 2001, he began studies at Cambridge Arts and Sciences (CATS), a private sixth-form college in Cambridge.

== Junior racing career ==
=== Karting ===
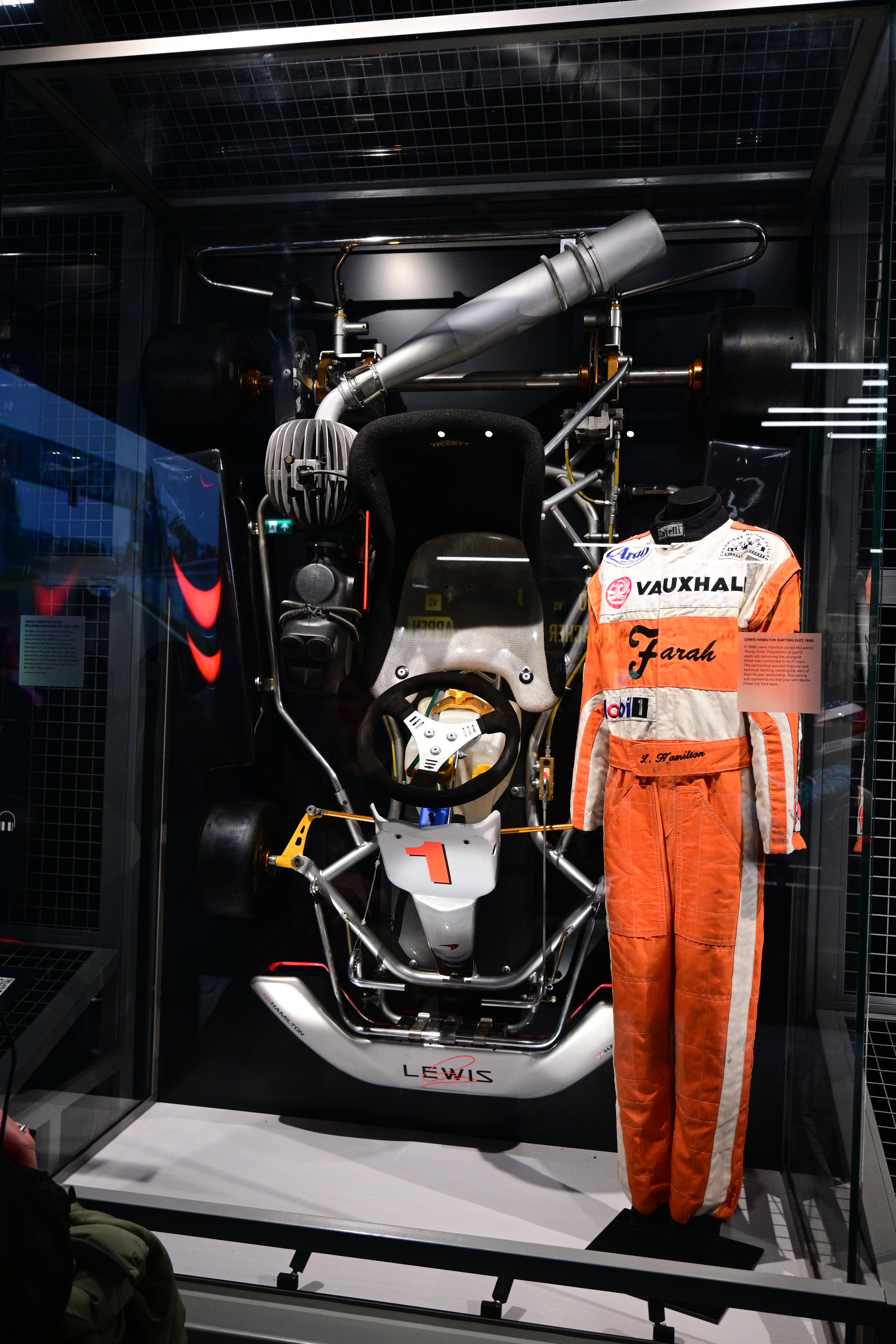
Hamilton joined the McLaren-Mercedes Young Driver Programme in 1998, winning the Karting World Cup and European Championship two years later.

Hamilton began karting in 1993 and quickly began winning races and cadet class championships. Two years later, he became the youngest driver to win the British cadet karting championship at the age of ten. That year, Hamilton approached McLaren Formula One team boss Ron Dennis at the Autosport Awards for an autograph and said: "Hi. I'm Lewis Hamilton. I won the British Championship and one day I want to be racing your cars." Dennis wrote in Hamilton's autograph book: "Phone me in nine years, we'll sort something out then."

When Hamilton was 12, Ladbrokes took a bet, at 40/1 odds, that Hamilton would win a Formula One race before the age of 23; another predicted, at 150/1 odds, that he would win the World Drivers' Championship before he was 25. In 1998, Dennis called Hamilton following his second Super One series and British championship wins, to offer Hamilton a role in the McLaren-Mercedes Young Driver Programme. The contract included an option of a future Formula One seat, which would make Hamilton the youngest driver to secure a contract that later resulted in a Formula One drive.

He's a quality driver, very strong and only 16. If he keeps this up I'm sure he will reach F1. It's something special to see a kid of his age out on the circuit. He's clearly got the right racing mentality.

— Michael Schumacher, speaking about Hamilton in 2001

Hamilton continued his progress in the Intercontinental A (1999), Formula A (2000) and Formula Super A (2001) ranks, and became European Champion in 2000 with maximum points. In Formula A and Formula Super A, racing for TeamMBM.com, his teammate was Nico Rosberg, who would later drive for the Williams and Mercedes teams in Formula One; they would later team up again for Mercedes from 2013 to 2016. Following his karting successes, the British Racing Drivers' Club made him a "Rising Star" Member in 2000. In 2001, Michael Schumacher made a one-off return to karts and competed against Hamilton along with other future Formula One drivers Vitantonio Liuzzi and Nico Rosberg. Hamilton ended the final in seventh, four places behind Schumacher. Although the two saw little of each other on the track, Schumacher praised the young Briton.

=== Formula Renault and Formula Three ===
Hamilton began his car racing career in the 2001 British Formula Renault Winter Series, finishing fifth in the standings. This led to a full 2002 Formula Renault UK campaign with Manor Motorsport in which he finished third overall, and fifth in the Formula Renault Eurocup amidst only competing for four rounds. He remained with Manor for another year in Formula Renault UK, winning the championship in a dominant fashion ahead of Alex Lloyd, as he registered 10 wins from 15 races. Having clinched the championship, Hamilton missed the last two races of the season to make his debut in the season finale of the British Formula 3 Championship. In his first race he was forced out with a puncture, and in the second he crashed out and was taken to hospital after a collision with teammate Tor Graves.

Asked in 2002 about the prospect of becoming one of the youngest ever Formula One drivers, Hamilton replied that his goal was "not to be the youngest in Formula One" but rather "to be experienced and then show what I can do in Formula One". He made his debut with Manor in the 2004 Formula 3 Euro Series, ending the year fifth in the championship. He also won the Bahrain F3 Superprix, and twice raced in the Macau F3 Grand Prix. Williams had come close to signing Hamilton but did not as BMW, their engine supplier at the time, refused to fund him. Hamilton eventually re-signed with McLaren. According to then McLaren executive and future CEO Martin Whitmarsh, who was responsible for guiding Hamilton through the team's young driver programme, he and Anthony Hamilton had a "huge row" at the end of the season, with his father pushing for him to move up to GP2 for 2005, while Whitmarsh felt that he should remain in Formula 3 for a second season, culminating in Whitmarsh tearing up Hamilton's contract; however, Hamilton called Whitmarsh six weeks later and re-signed with the team.

Hamilton had his first Formula One test with McLaren in late 2004 at Silverstone. He moved to the reigning Euro Series champions, ASM for the 2005 season and dominated the championship, winning 15 of the 20 rounds and bragging 13 pole positions. He also won the Marlboro Masters of Formula 3 at Zandvoort. Following his success, British magazine Autosport featured him in their "Top 50 Drivers of 2005" issue, ranking Hamilton at 24th.

=== GP2 ===
Hamilton moved to ASM's sister GP2 team, ART Grand Prix, for the 2006 season. Hamilton won the GP2 championship at his first attempt, beating Nelson Piquet Jr. He secured a dominant win at the Nürburgring, amidst a penalty for speeding in the pit lane. At his home race in Silverstone, Hamilton overtook two rivals at Becketts, a series of high-speed corners where overtaking is considered to be rare. In Istanbul he recovered from a spin that left him in 18th place to take second. Hamilton won the title in unusual circumstances, inheriting the final point he needed after Giorgio Pantano was stripped of fastest lap in the Monza feature race.

== Formula One career ==
=== McLaren (2007–2012) ===
Hamilton's success in the GP2 championship coincided with a vacancy at McLaren-Mercedes following the departure of Juan Pablo Montoya to NASCAR and Kimi Räikkönen to Ferrari. Hamilton was given nearly 5,000 miles (8,000 km) of testing in the McLaren MP4-21 to acclimatise himself to Formula One, alongside Pedro de la Rosa and Gary Paffett. Ultimately, Hamilton was confirmed as the team's second driver; the announcement was not made public for nearly two months, reportedly to avoid being overlooked by Michael Schumacher's retirement announcement.

==== 2007–2008: Record-breaking debut seasons ====
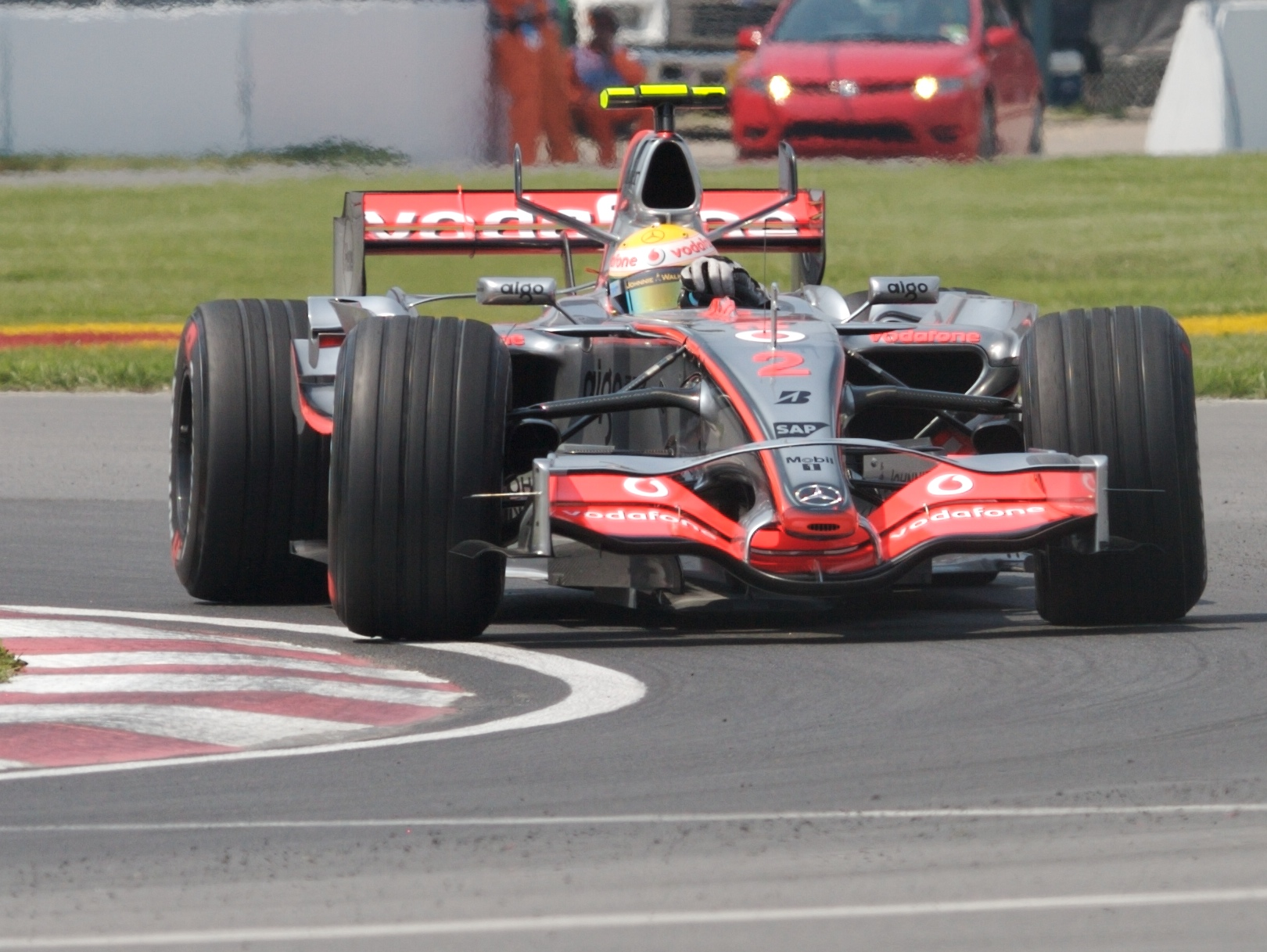
Hamilton took his maiden Formula One victory at the 2007 Canadian Grand Prix, in his sixth appearance.

Hamilton's maiden season in Formula One saw him partner two-time defending World Drivers' Champion Fernando Alonso at McLaren. At the season-opening Australian Grand Prix, Hamilton became the first—and, as of 2026, only—black driver to race in the series. After finishing third on debut, Hamilton went on to set several records, including the most consecutive podium finishes from debut (9), the most wins in a debut season (4, shared with Jacques Villeneuve), and the then-most points in a debut season (109). Acquiring the championship lead as early as in the fourth round of the season, Hamilton became the youngest driver to lead the World Drivers' Championship. After a series of misfortunes in the latter half of the season, including strategic missteps by McLaren in the closing rounds and a retirement at the Chinese Grand Prix, Hamilton's 12-point advantage in the standings evanesced. He finished runner-up in the championship to Räikkönen by one point, classified ahead of teammate Alonso whilst finishing level on points. (Note: Hamilton and Alonso both scored 109 points in 2007, with Hamilton classified ahead on count-back, by virtue of having more second-placed finishes.) Throughout the season, Hamilton and Alonso were involved in several incidents, which resulted in inter-team tensions, culminating in Alonso and McLaren terminating their contract by mutual consent. Hamilton signed a £50 million contract to stay with the team until the end of 2012.

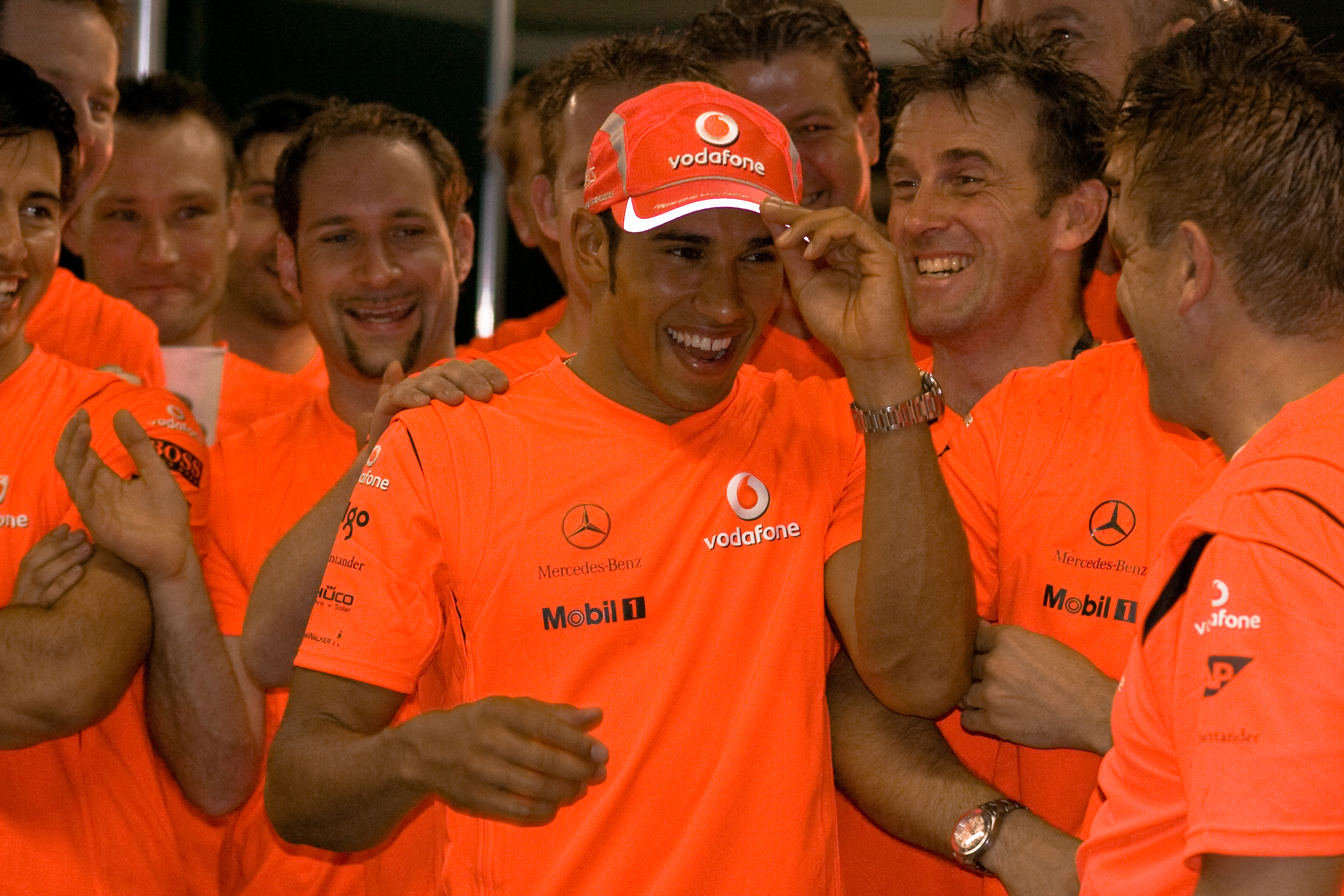
Hamilton (centre) celebrates his maiden World Drivers' Championship with McLaren at the 2008 Brazilian Grand Prix.

Partnering Heikki Kovalainen for 2008, Hamilton's winning form continued as he amassed five race victories and 10 podium finishes. Ferrari drivers, along with BMW's Robert Kubica, emerged as his closest rivals, as they engaged in a close battle for the title with Hamilton during the first half of the season. At the rain-affected British Grand Prix, he won by over a minute from second-placed Nick Heidfeld, which was widely acclaimed as one of the greatest wet-weather performances in Formula One history. As the season progressed towards the closing rounds, the championship became a clear two-way fight between Hamilton and Ferrari's Felipe Massa. Hamilton won his maiden title at the season-ending Brazilian Grand Prix, overtaking Timo Glock for fifth-place at the final corners of the last lap to become the then-youngest World Drivers' Champion, and deny race-winner Massa the title by one point. Hamilton also became the first British driver to win the World Drivers' Championship since Damon Hill in 1996.

==== 2009–2012: Unsuccessful title bids and departure from McLaren ====
During his veering final years with McLaren—a period largely dominated by Red Bull—Hamilton continued to score podium finishes and race victories, and challenged for titles. Major technical regulation changes in 2009 led to a challenging start for McLaren. Often qualifying outside of the top ten, and struggling to finish consistently on points, Hamilton's chances of defending his title became unfeasible. Major upgrades at the German Grand Prix saw a dramatic improvement in performance of the MP4-24 car. From that point onward, Hamilton advanced from eleventh to fifth in the standings and outscored the rest of the field, securing two race victories and three additional podium finishes across the remaining nine rounds.

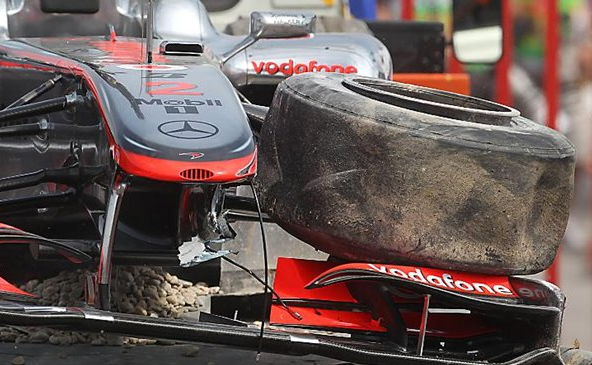
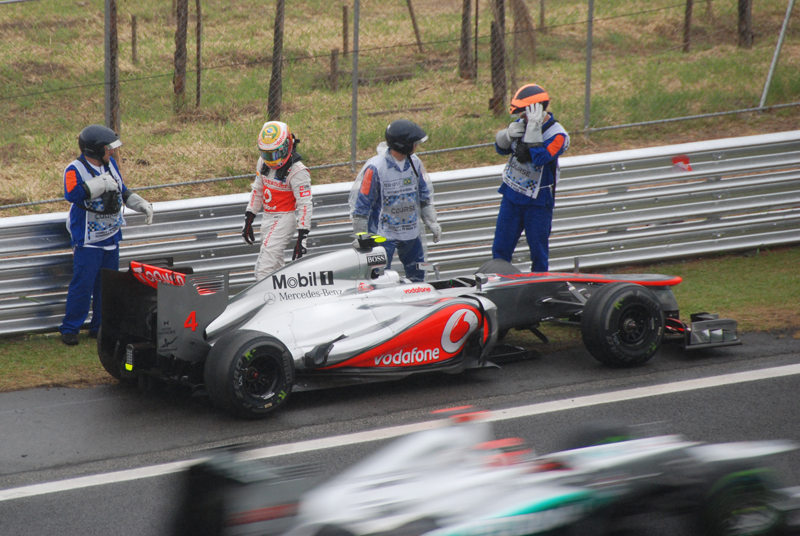
Several race retirements hindered Hamilton's chances of winning the title in 2010 and 2012. Pictured are the 2010 Spanish Grand Prix (left), and 2012 Brazilian Grand Prix (right), with the latter being his final race for McLaren.

In 2010, Hamilton was partnered by reigning World Drivers' Champion Jenson Button. Whilst McLaren struggled to match the outright pace of Red Bull and Ferrari, Hamilton engaged in a four-way title battle with Alonso, Sebastian Vettel and Mark Webber throughout the season. At the Canadian Grand Prix, he secured McLaren's only pole position of the season, and took the championship lead after winning the race. Hamilton's latter half of the season unravelled with a number of misfortunes, including race-ending collisions and mechanical failures, culminated in him losing vital points to his rivals, and ultimately, the championship lead. He entered the final round of the season with an outside chance of winning the title, but finished fourth in the standings as Vettel won his maiden title.

2011 was a challenging year for Hamilton, marking the first season he had been out-scored by a teammate, as Button finished runner-up to Vettel. Setbacks in his private life, as well as on-track collisions culminating in multiple run-ins with the stewards, contributed to his inconsistent performances throughout the season. Hamilton finished fifth in the standings with three race wins; he secured the only non-Red Bull pole position of the season at the Korean Grand Prix, and vowed he would return to form.

In 2012, McLaren emerged as contenders for the title, with Hamilton remaining in title contention during the first half of the season. Akin to the 2010 season, he endured a challenging latter half of the season, with inconsistent results and a series of mechanical failures. Across those ten races, Hamilton encountered five retirements, three whilst leading. Ultimately, Hamilton finished fourth in the standings, achieving four race wins and a season-highest seven pole positions. Motorsport.com analysis found that Hamilton had lost an estimated 110 points due to race retirements and other misfortunes. Prior to the end of the year, having denied multiple renegotiations with McLaren, Hamilton announced—to widespread surprise—that he would be joining Mercedes for the 2013 season. Hamilton expressed his gratitude, stating he was "forever grateful" for the opportunities and support he had received throughout his career, ending a 15-year association with McLaren.

=== Mercedes (2013–2024) ===
==== 2013–2016: Teammates with Rosberg ====
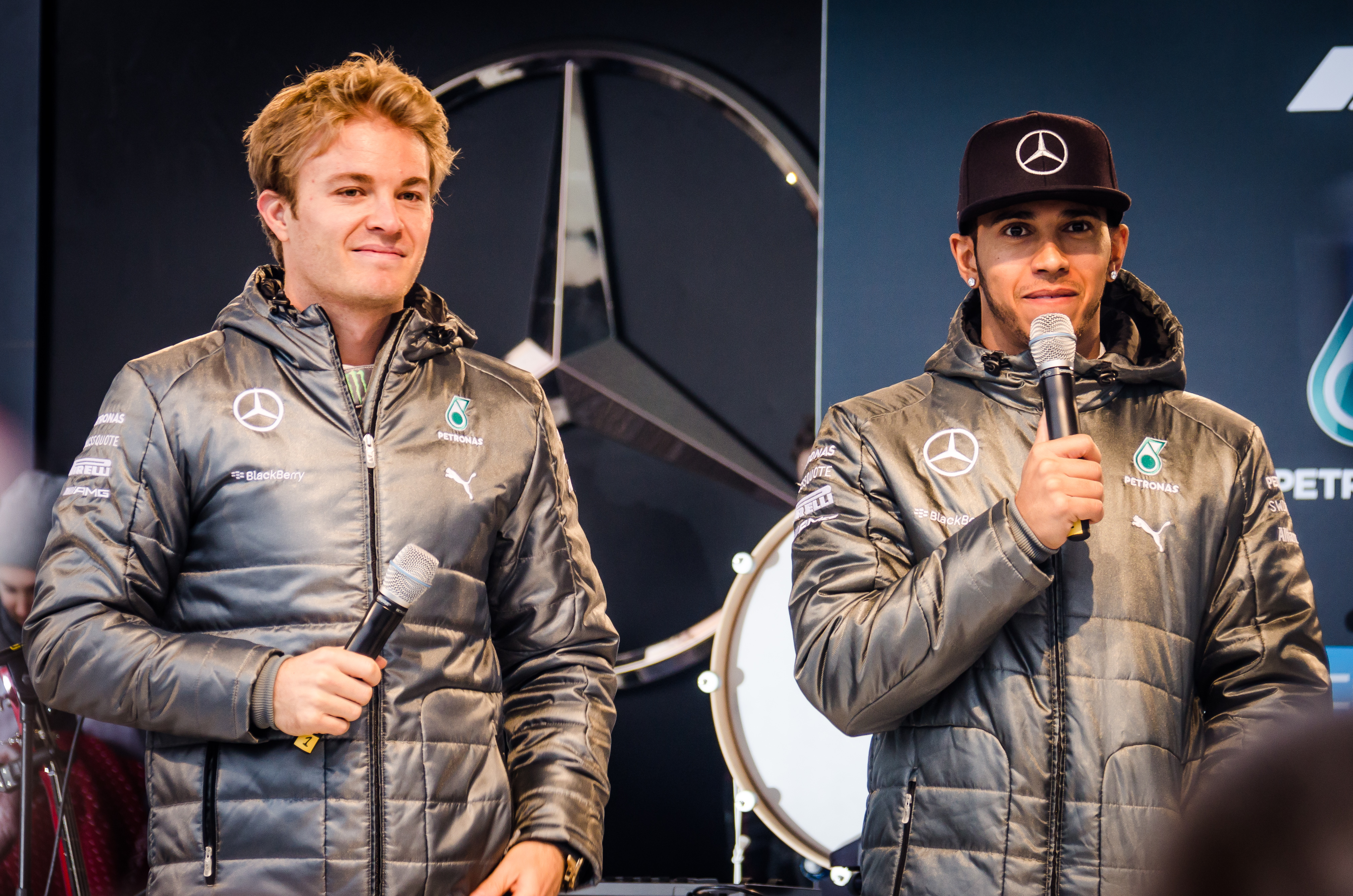
Hamilton and Rosberg endured a tense rivalry whilst teammates at Mercedes.

Upon signing with Mercedes in 2013, with a deal reportedly worth more than £60 million to replace the retiring Schumacher, Hamilton was reunited with his childhood karting teammate, Nico Rosberg. The move was met with surprise by pundits and the public, with some describing the move to Mercedes—a team with no recent history of success—as a gamble. In his first season with the Brackley-based team—amidst Mercedes W04's tyre management struggles—Hamilton finished fourth in the standings, securing five podium finishes and pole positions, with only one converted into a race victory at the Hungarian Grand Prix. Whilst Pirelli's switch in tyre construction contributed to his victory in Hungary, Hamilton and Mercedes endured a difficult latter half of the season, as he only managed to achieve one podium finish for the rest of the year.

Changes to engine regulations for the 2014 season, which mandated the use of turbo-hybrid engines, contributed to the start of a highly successful era for Hamilton. Mercedes won 16 of the 19 races held that season; Hamilton secured a career-best 11 victories as he prevailed in a season-long duel for the title against teammate Rosberg. After securing a streak of wins and acquiring the championship lead, Hamilton endured a number of misfortunes mid-season, including mechanical failures and a collision with Rosberg which culminated in a retirement from the Belgian Grand Prix, saw him trailing Rosberg by 29 points in the standings. Following a run of five consecutive race victories towards the end of the season, Hamilton clinched his second World Drivers' Championship at the final round in Abu Dhabi, and declared it was "the greatest day of [his] life" over team radio.

Opting to continue racing with his old karting number 44, Hamilton fended off Rosberg's challenge for the title for a second year running in 2015, winning 10 races from a then-joint record 17 podium finishes, scoring 11 pole positions in the first 12 races, and leading the championship throughout the season, he achieved his first back-to-back championships. His rivalry with Rosberg intensified, climaxing in a heated battle at the United States Grand Prix, where Hamilton clinched the title with three races to spare. Hamilton extended his contract with Mercedes for three additional years in a deal reportedly worth more than £100 million; the deal allowed Hamilton to retain his own image rights and keep his championship-winning cars and trophies.

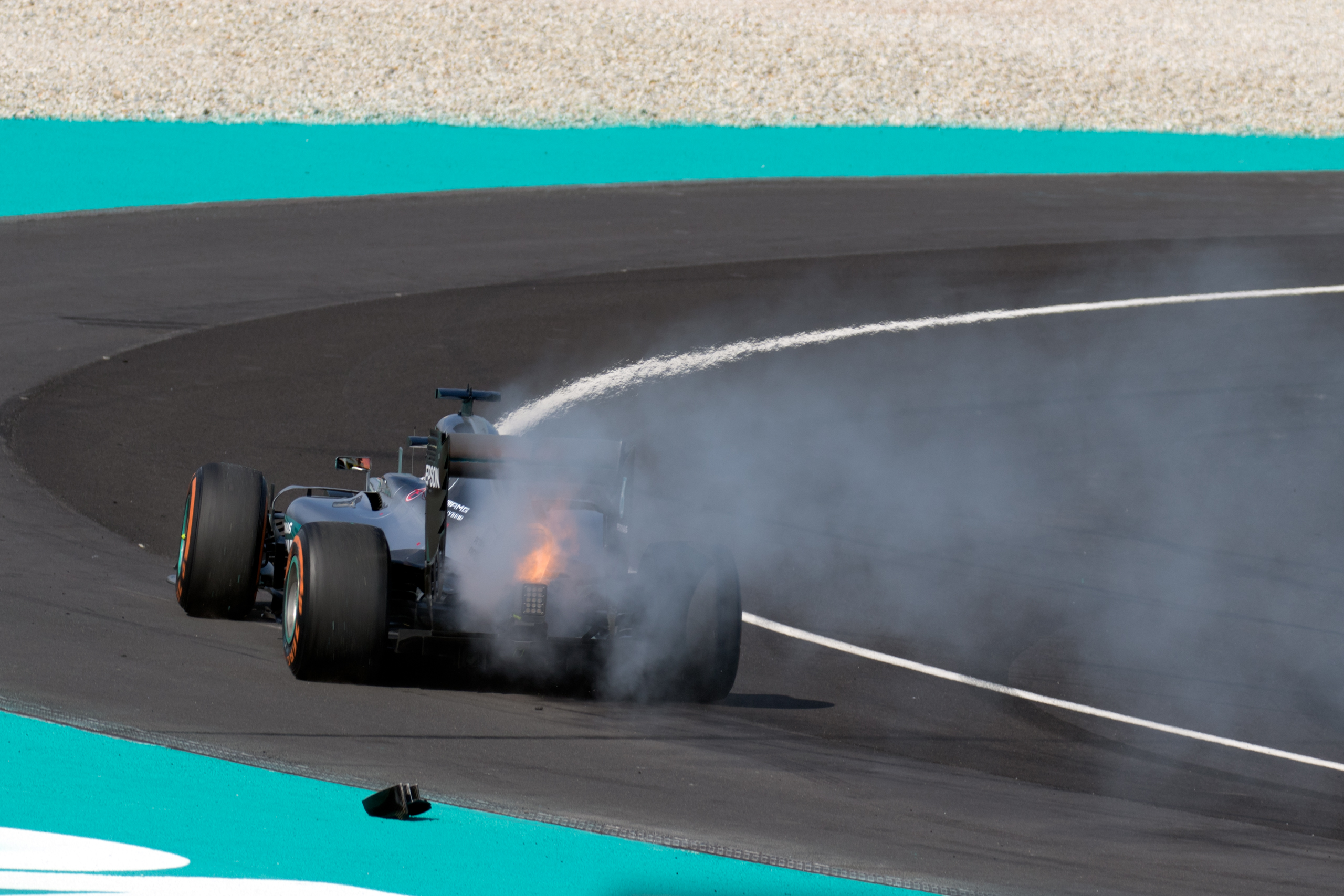
A series of poor race-starts and an engine failure at the Malaysian Grand Prix (pictured) were highlighted as key moments as Hamilton finished runner-up to Rosberg in the 2016 championship.

After another season-long duel for the title in 2016, Hamilton finished runner-up in the championship to Rosberg by five points. He endured a challenging start to the season, as a succession of poor race-starts and mechanical failures culminated in him being marginally behind Rosberg in the standings. Mercedes's policy of letting the pair fight freely led to several acrimonious exchanges on-track, culminating in collisions at the Spanish and Austrian Grands Prix. Hamilton won six of seven races mid-season, including the Hungarian Grand Prix, where he overtook his teammate to the championship lead for the first time of the season. After a crucial engine blowout in Malaysia, Hamilton secured a hat-trick of wins—including his 50th race victory in the United States, and 100th podium finish in Japan—to enter the season-ending Abu Dhabi Grand Prix, 12 points adrift of Rosberg. In Abu Dhabi, Hamilton defied team orders—deliberately slowing Rosberg into the chasing pack at the end of the race, in an unsuccessful bid to encourage other drivers to overtake his teammate. Rosberg took the title before announcing his shock retirement from the sport, immediately after beating his rival. Finishing runner-up in the championship, Hamilton broke the record for most wins in a season without becoming the champion, securing a season-highest 10 race victories, in addition to the record for most career points of all-time.

==== 2017–2020: Four titles in a row ====
Following Rosberg's retirement, Hamilton was partnered by Valtteri Bottas in 2017. With Ferrari emerging as the team to beat after the major overhaul in aerodynamics regulations, Vettel became Hamilton's closest rival, as he led the standings throughout the first half of the season ahead of Hamilton. Following the summer break, benefitting from Vettel's misfortunes and Mercedes's resurgence, Hamilton dominated the subsequent races, winning five in six, including the Italian Grand Prix where he broke the record for all-time most pole positions, and overtook Vettel for the championship lead for the first time of the season. Registering a total of 11 pole positions, nine race victories, and equalling the record for most grand slams in a season (3), Hamilton won his fourth World Drivers' title at the Mexican Grand Prix with two races to spare.

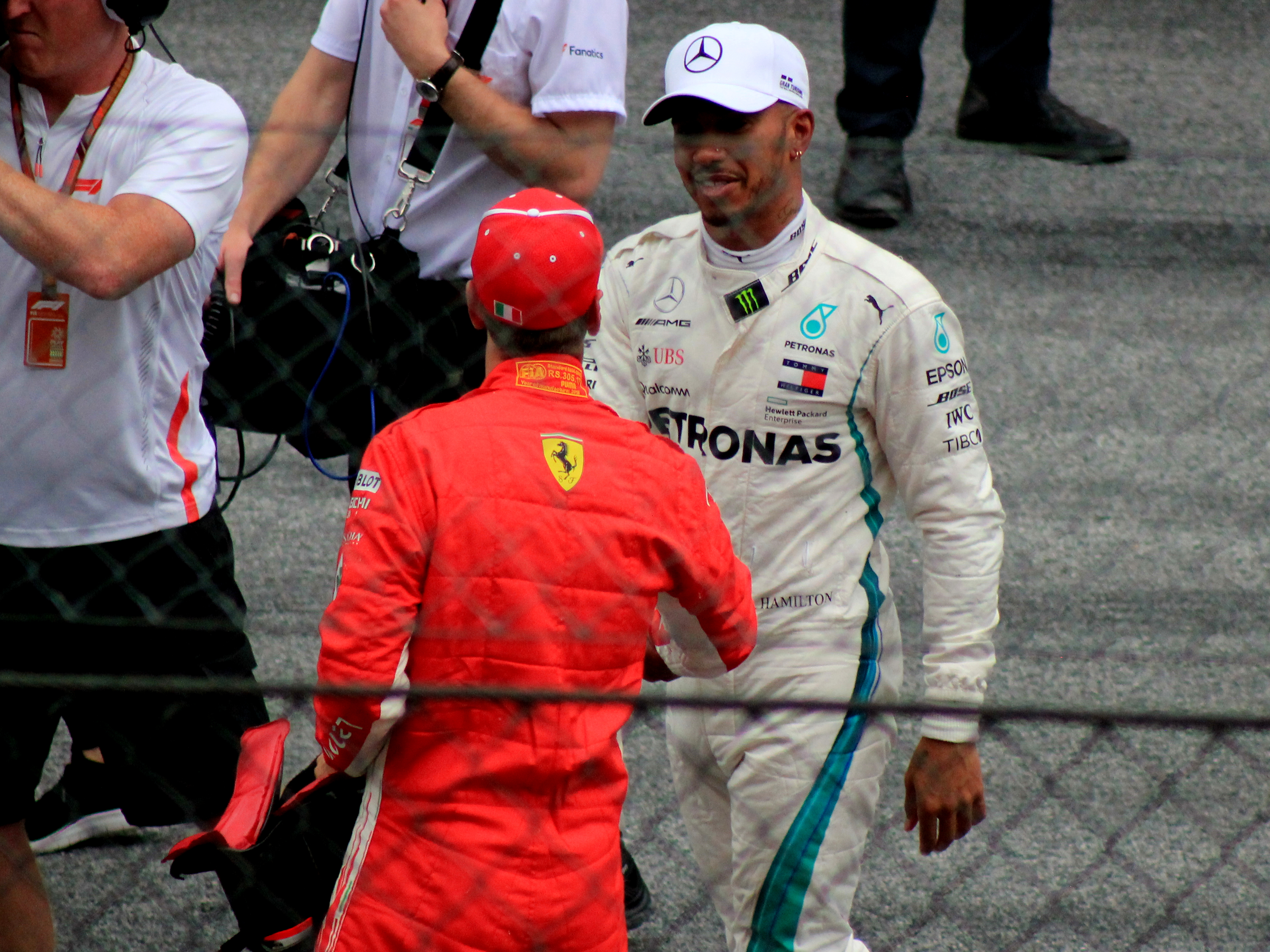
The 2018 season marked the first time that two four-time World Champions (Hamilton and Vettel) competed for a fifth title.

In 2018, whilst Ferrari once again held the upper hand, Hamilton and Vettel engaged in a much closer battle for their fifth title—widely billed as the "Fight for Five"—they exchanged the championship lead several times until the half-way point of the season. Beginning from the German Grand Prix—where Vettel made an error while leading and retired, and Hamilton won starting from 14th on the grid—Vettel's season unravelled with a number of driver errors in the following races. Meanwhile, Hamilton repeated his run of consecutive wins to clinch his fifth title at the Mexican Grand Prix for a second year running. Securing a total of 11 pole positions and race victories from 17 podium finishes, he set a new record for most points scored in a season (408). During the season, Hamilton signed a two-year contract extension with Mercedes, reported to be worth up to £40 million per year, making him the best-paid Formula One driver in history.

Hamilton led the championship standings for the majority of 2019, whilst benefitting from Mercedes's dominant performances during the first half of the season, he fended off title challenges from teammate Bottas, and remained unchallenged amidst Ferrari's sturdy performances following the summer break. Hamilton clinched his sixth title at the United States Grand Prix with two races remaining. After scoring his sixth career grand slam at the Abu Dhabi Grand Prix, the season finale, Hamilton ended the season with 11 race wins in 17 podiums (matching the all-time record for a fourth time), and broke his own record for most points by scoring a total of 413 points, 87 points clear of second-placed Bottas.

Hamilton dominated the 2020 season to win his seventh Drivers' title, equalling the record for most titles set by Schumacher, in a season heavily impacted by the COVID-19 pandemic. Over the shortened seventeen-race season, Hamilton secured ten pole positions and eleven race victories (equalling his previous personal best for the fifth time, in fewer races) including one from the Portuguese Grand Prix, where he achieved his 92nd career win and broke the record for all-time most wins. Hamilton missed the Sakhir Grand Prix after contracting COVID-19, his first race absence since his debut in 2007. Providing one of his greatest performances, Hamilton clinched the title at the rain-affected Turkish Grand Prix with three rounds to spare, and ended the season 124 points ahead of second-placed Bottas.

==== 2021: Title battle vs. Verstappen ====
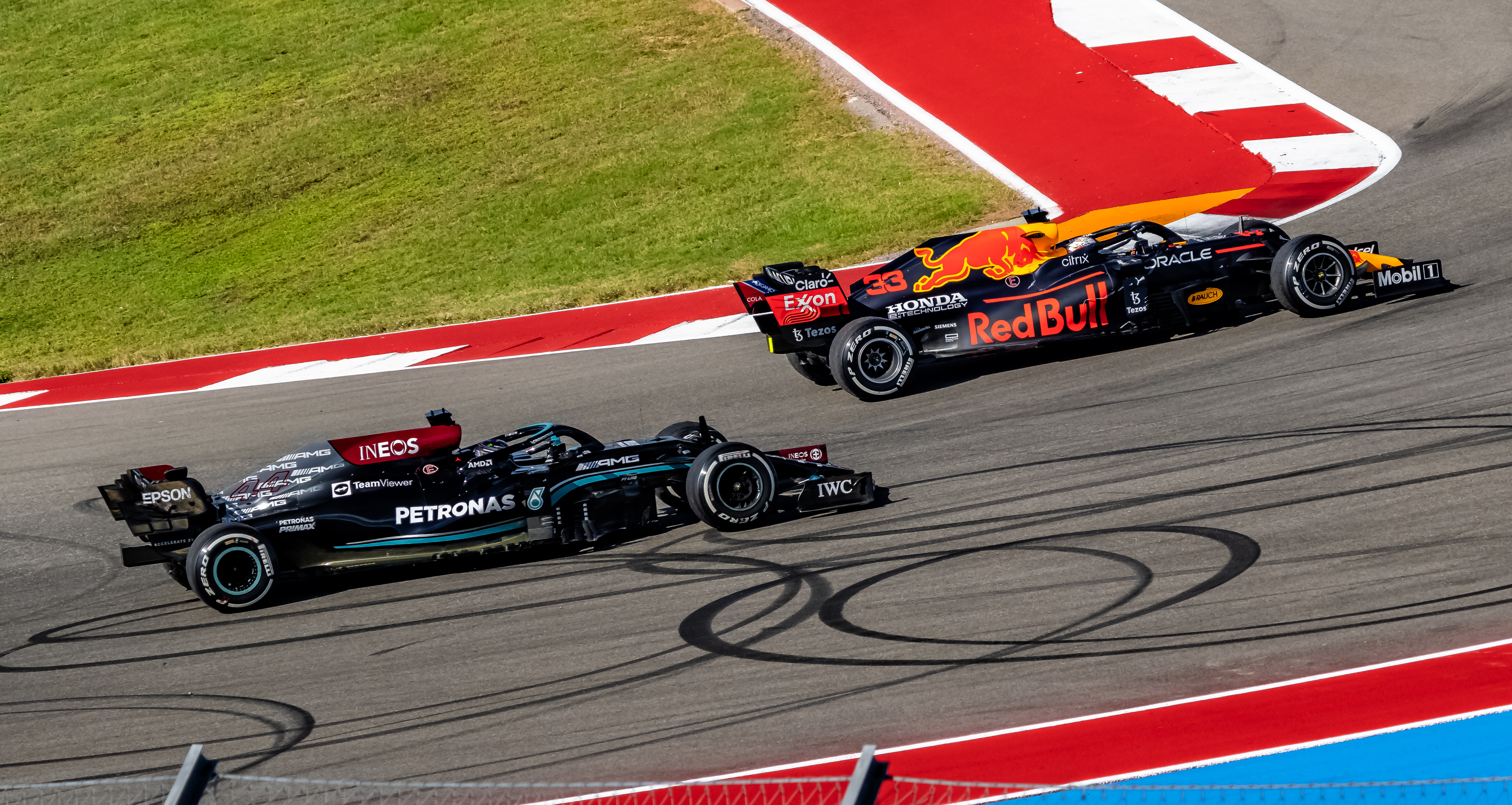
Hamilton (left) and Verstappen (right), pictured at the United States Grand Prix, frequently exchanged the championship lead throughout the 2021 season, and entered the final round equal on points.

Regulation changes for the 2021 season saw Red Bull make performance gains on Mercedes, winning five consecutive races and acquiring the championship lead, Red Bull's Max Verstappen and Hamilton emerged as title favourites early on in the season. Amidst their intense battle for the title, the pair engaged in several on-track battles—culminating in collisions in Britain, Italy and Saudi Arabia—and finished 1–2 at 14 of 22 Grands Prix. Hamilton achieved his 100th pole position and race win at the Spanish and Russian Grands Prix, respectively, becoming the first driver to achieve either feat. Securing a hat-trick of wins in the penultimate rounds, including a recovery drive at the São Paulo Grand Prix—which was acclaimed as one of his greatest performances—Hamilton eliminated a 19-point deficit to Verstappen to enter the season-ending Abu Dhabi Grand Prix level on points. In Abu Dhabi, having led the majority of the race, Hamilton was denied the championship by a last-lap overtake from Verstappen following a late safety car. During the year, Hamilton extended his £40 million per year contract with Mercedes for two additional years.

The season finale was marred by controversy over race director Michael Masi's decision to instruct the lapped cars separating Verstappen and Hamilton to un-lap themselves under the safety car, which closed the gap between the pair and allowed Verstappen, who opted to pit for soft tyres, to enter the final lap immediately behind Hamilton, who remained on worn hard tyres. Four days after the race, the FIA announced that it would conduct an internal investigation into the incident. Masi was subsequently removed from his role as race director, with the FIA World Motor Sport Council report finding that "human error" resulted in the failure to follow Formula One Sporting Regulations concerning the withdrawal of the safety car, adding that the final standings are "valid, final and cannot now be changed". Notwithstanding the controversy in Abu Dhabi, BBC Sport's Andrew Benson described the season as "one of the most intense, hard-fought battles in sporting history", with Hamilton and Verstappen having "been head and shoulders—and a lot more—clear of every other driver on the grid".

==== 2022–2024: Ground-effect struggles and departure from Mercedes ====
We dreamed alone, but together we believed. Thank you for all the courage, the determination, the passion, and for seeing me and supporting me. What started out as a leap of faith turned into a journey into the history books. We did everything together and I'm so so grateful to everyone.

— Hamilton on team radio after the 2024 Abu Dhabi Grand Prix, his final race with Mercedes.

Partnered by George Russell in place of the departing Bottas, the 2022 season marked the first time in Hamilton's Formula One career that he did not secure a race win or a pole position. Significant changes in technical regulations saw Hamilton and Mercedes endure a challenging campaign, as the innovative and radically different W13 car suffered with porpoising throughout the season, leading him to deem it "undrivable" and causing him to sustain a back injury at the Azerbaijan Grand Prix. He frequently experimented with car setups to aid the W13's development during the opening stages of the season. Following major mid-season car upgrades, Hamilton achieved several podium finishes. Hamilton set several records across his sixteenth season, including most consecutive seasons with a podium finish, and at least one lap led. The season also marked the first time Hamilton finished behind his teammate in the standings since 2016, finishing sixth, 35 points behind Russell in fourth.

Mercedes once again faced concerns over their car's competitiveness ahead of the 2023 season. Hamilton endured another winless campaign amidst Red Bull dominance, securing several podium finishes throughout and finishing third in the standings. He took his record ninth pole at the Hungarian Grand Prix—his first since 2021—surpassing Senna's and Schumacher's records for the most pole positions at the same Grand Prix. Hamilton signed a two-year contract extension worth over £100 million to remain with Mercedes.

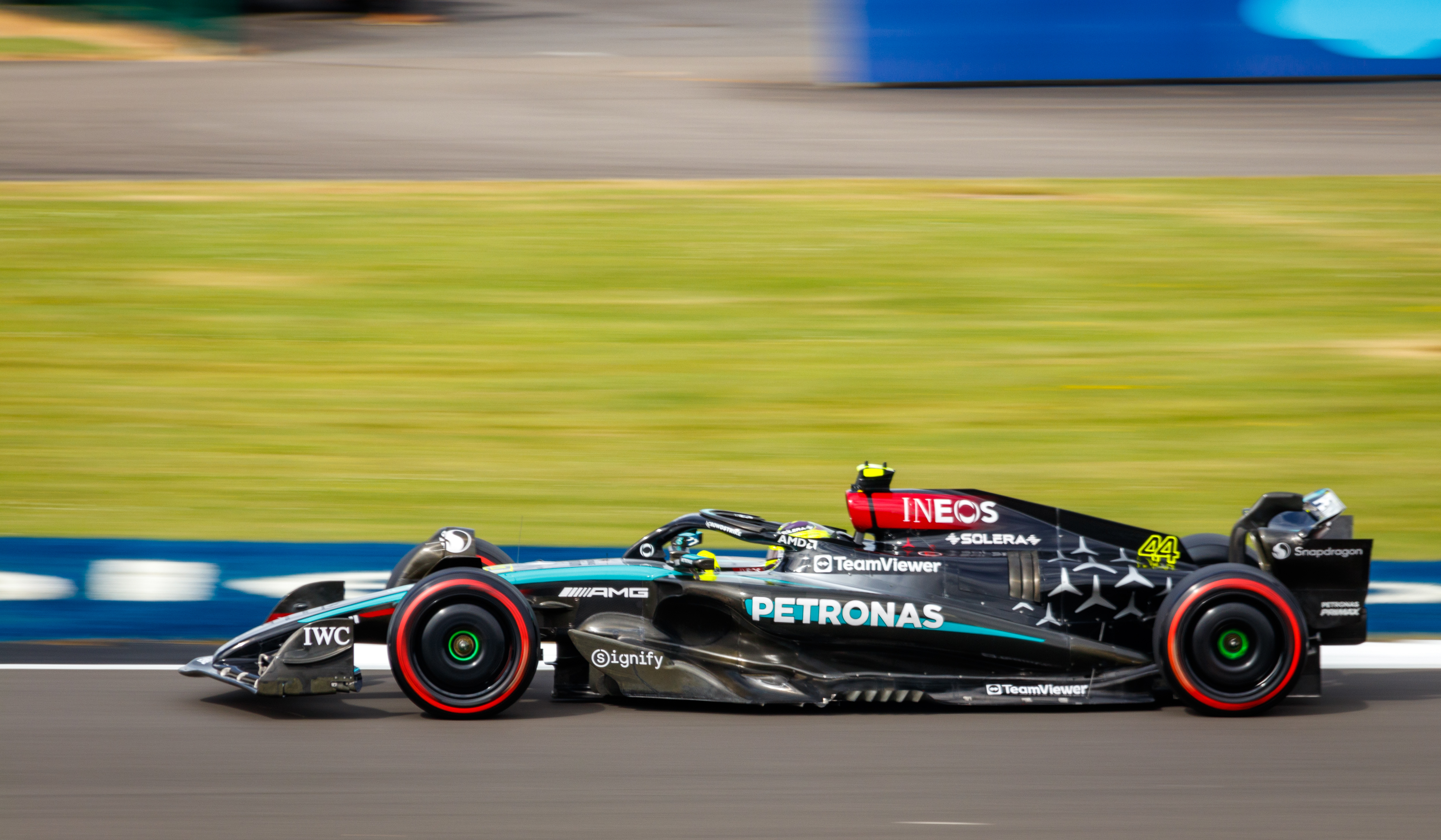
Hamilton won the 2024 British Grand Prix, his first race victory since 2021.

Prior to the start of the 2024 season, Hamilton triggered an exit-clause in his contract, allowing him to leave Mercedes at the end of his campaign, a year before his contract was due to expire. Having been associated with the German marque since the age of 13, Hamilton explained the decision was one of his hardest to make, adding that he needed a new challenge and a different work environment. Mercedes's inconsistent form, coupled with Hamilton's difficulties in adapting to the W15 car—whose characteristics struggled to mesh with his driving style—led to inconsistent qualifying performances, resulting in another challenging season. Mercedes's resurgence during the mid-season enabled him to deliver his ninth British Grand Prix victory, ending his 31-month winless drought; he broke the record for most wins at the same Grand Prix and became the first driver to win beyond their 300th start. Hamilton secured his 200th podium finish in Hungary, and another victory at the Belgian Grand Prix. After a series of races with fluctuating results, admitting he was "looking forward to the end [of the season]", Hamilton ended the season a career-lowest seventh in the championship—22 points behind teammate Russell—marking the end of his Mercedes career, which was the most successful driver–constructor partnership in Formula One history by several metrics. (Note: Including the most races (246), wins (84), pole positions (78), podium finishes (153), fastest laps (55), and World Drivers' Championships (6).)

=== Ferrari (2025–present) ===
==== 2025–present: First season acclimations and return to form ====
Following the announcement of his departure from Mercedes, Ferrari announced they had reached a multi-year agreement with Hamilton to join the team in 2025, on a contract reported to be worth £41 million per year, replacing Carlos Sainz Jr. as teammate to Charles Leclerc. Hamilton stated it had been a "childhood dream" to drive for Ferrari. In parallel to his move from McLaren to Mercedes in 2013, it was noted as one of the most unexpected driver transfers in Formula One history, and marked the first time in his career where he did not drive for a Mercedes-powered team. His difficulties with the ground-effect generation of cars persisted throughout his debut season with the team. Much like in 2024, his "painful" campaign was marked by fluctuating results, including his maiden sprint victory at the Chinese Grand Prix before being disqualified from the main race for a technical infringement, and enduring consecutive Q1 exits in the final three races for the first time of his career. In addition to Ferrari's inconsistent performances throughout the season, Hamilton admitted to feeling less confident with the car compared to teammate Leclerc, describing it feeling as "alien" compared to his prolonged experiences with Mercedes. Hamilton ended the season sixth in the championship, 86 points behind teammate Leclerc, marking the first season of his career in which he did not secure at least one podium finish.

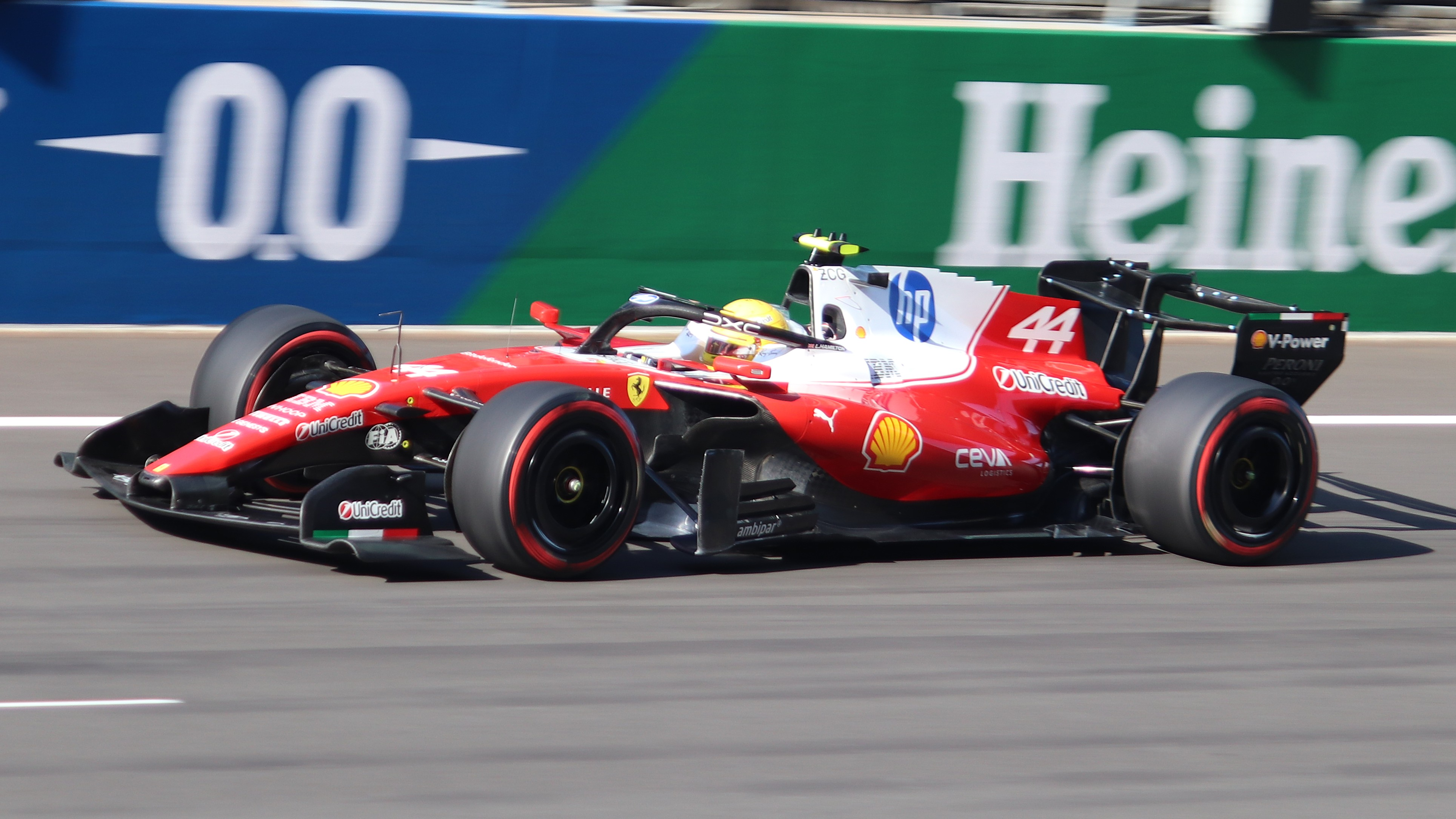
Hamilton achieved his first Grand Prix podium with Ferrari at the 2026 Chinese Grand Prix.

Ahead of the 2026 regulation changes, Hamilton was reported to be contributing to shaping of the team's competitiveness. He had held a series of meetings with the team principal Frédéric Vasseur, head of car development Loïc Serra, chairman John Elkann, and CEO Benedetto Vigna, focusing on structural changes and car development, and presented detailed documents outlining his suggestions for improvement. As the season commenced, Ferrari emerged among the frontrunners, trailing the dominant Mercedes in terms of car performance. Hamilton secured his first Grand Prix podium finish with the team at the Chinese Grand Prix, followed by consecutive podiums at the Canadian and Monaco Grands Prix, before achieving his maiden Grand Prix victory with Ferrari at the inaugural Barcelona-Catalunya Grand Prix. These strong performances led Hamilton into title contention with the Mercedes drivers. However, his title challenge short-lived following the summer break, as Ferrari's strategic missteps and delayed car upgrades left them outpaced by rival teams. Following his retirement from the Spanish Grand Prix, the points deficit between Hamilton and championship leader—and eventual winner—Kimi Antonelli had extended to more than 100 points. Hamilton claimed his first Grand Prix pole for Ferrari at the Mexican Grand Prix, his first in three years, making him the oldest polesitter in Formula One since Mario Andretti at the 1982 Italian Grand Prix.

== Driver profile ==
=== Driving style ===
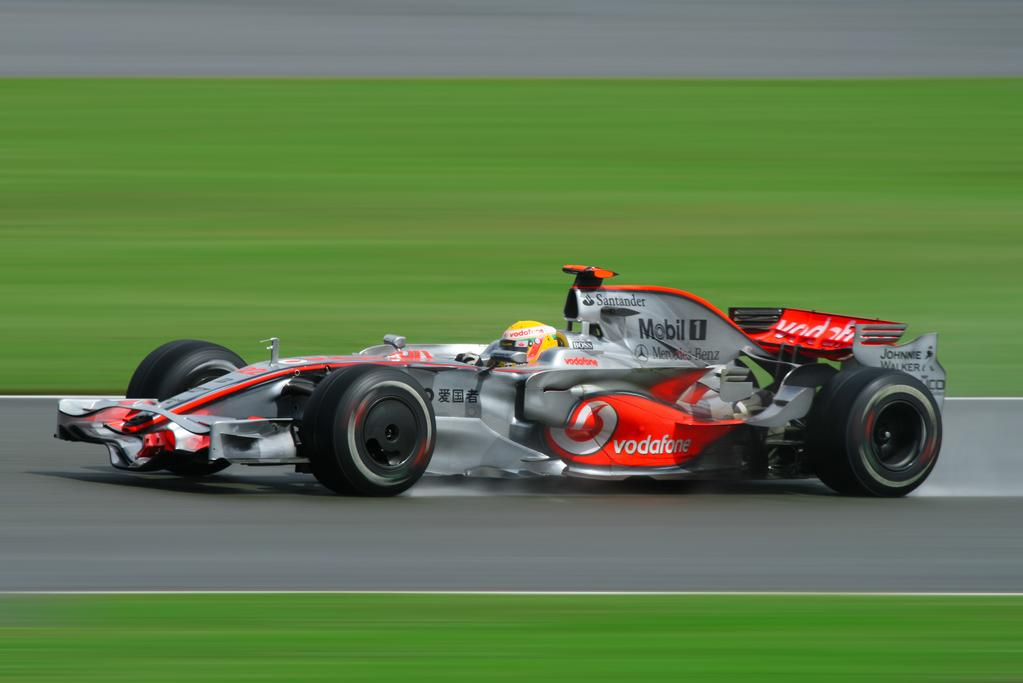
Hamilton won by over a minute from second-placed Nick Heidfeld at the 2008 British Grand Prix.

Hamilton is regarded as one of the most complete drivers on the grid, excelling across a wide range of areas. He has been described as having an aggressive driving style, with a natural aptitude for identifying the limits of the car. Mark Hughes, writing for the official Formula One website, described how Hamilton is "super-hard on the brakes ... but has a fantastic ability to match how quickly the downforce is bleeding off with his modulation of the pressure so that there's no wasted grip but no locked wheels either." Paddy Lowe, previously the engineering director for McLaren, described how Hamilton is comfortable with levels of rear instability that most other drivers would find intolerable.

Hamilton has also been praised for his ability to adapt to variances in car set-up and changing track conditions; throughout his career, he has typically used less fuel than his teammates as a result of his ability to carry momentum through corners. Pedro de la Rosa, a former test driver for McLaren who worked with Hamilton and Alonso, rated the pair as the best he had seen first hand, stating that they shared a strength in terms of "how much speed they can run into the apex [of a corner] and still have a decent exit speed", highlighting in particular their ability to maintain this speed when their rear tyres have lost grip during a longer stint.

Hamilton has been praised for his consistency, especially in his time at Mercedes. From 2017 to 2018, he finished 33 consecutive races in point-scoring positions, a run brought to an end as a result of mechanical issues. Ross Brawn wrote that "over the course of [2018], Hamilton hardly put a foot wrong, winning not only the races he should have, but also some where the opposition was stronger, and that is the true mark of a champion." Ahead of the 2021 season, Martin Brundle, commentating for Sky Sports, said "I think what has stood out about Lewis over the years is how few mistakes he makes, how complete he is and clean ... he just never makes a mistake [in] wheel-to-wheel combat [or] in qualifying ... He just doesn't fade, mentally or physically."

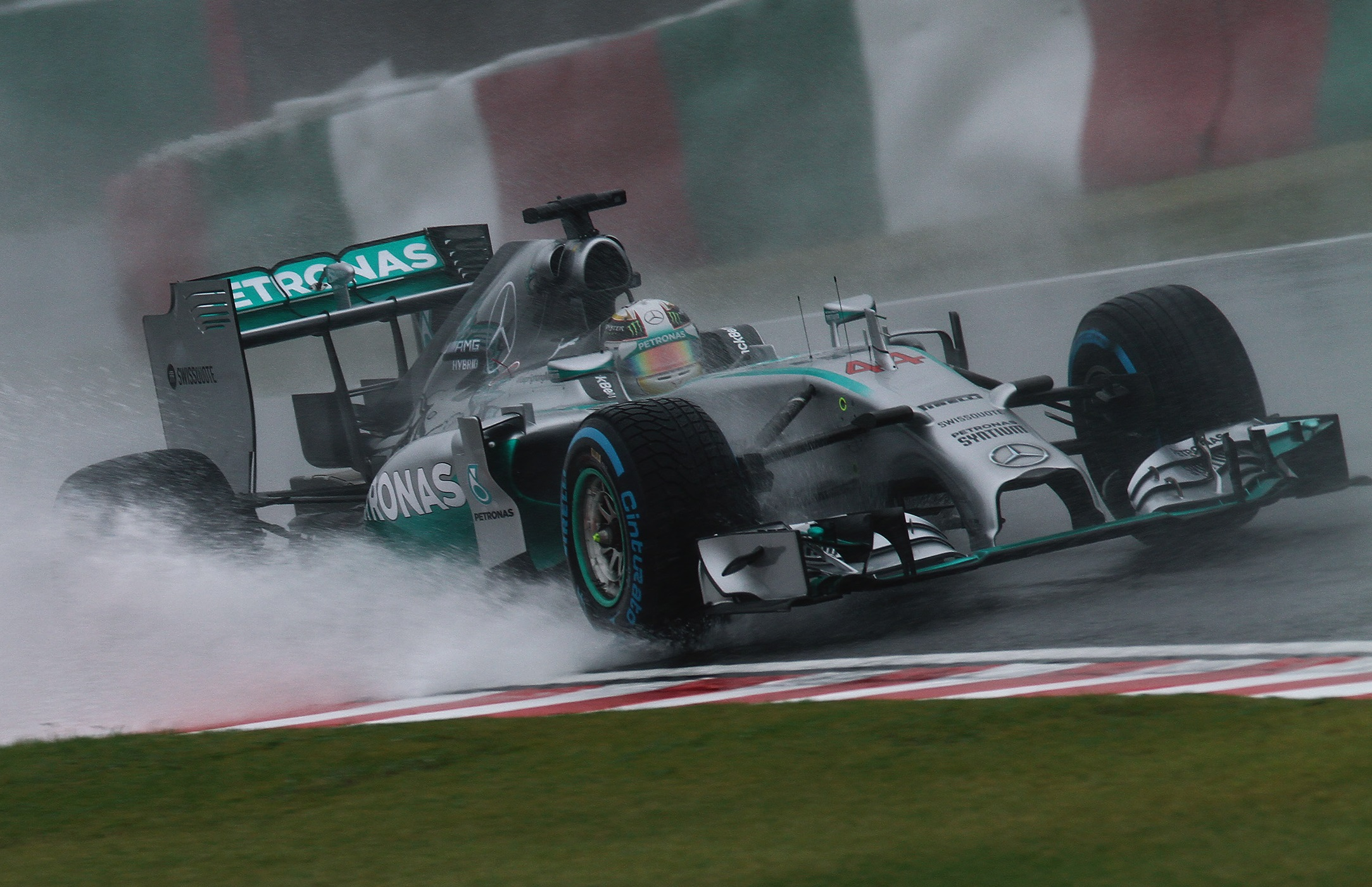
Hamilton won the 2014 Japanese Grand Prix in torrential rain, and compared the conditions to his victory at the 2008 British Grand Prix.

Hamilton is regarded as one of the best wet-weather drivers in the sport, with some of his best performances occurring in those conditions. In the 2008 British Grand Prix, Hamilton bested second-place Nick Heidfeld by over a minute, the largest margin of victory recorded since the 1995 Australian Grand Prix. During the turbo-hybrid era, Hamilton remained unbeaten in every race affected by wet weather from the 2014 Japanese Grand Prix up to the 2019 German Grand Prix, where his almost five-year streak was broken by Max Verstappen. His wet weather drive at the 2020 Turkish Grand Prix where he clinched his seventh world title was widely acclaimed, with Joe Saward describing it as "one of his greatest performances". Qualifying sixth for the race after Mercedes struggled with tyre temperatures and a track that lacked grip after being recently resurfaced, during the race he gambled on a one-stop strategy in mixed conditions whilst his rivals chose to change their tyres for a second time, enabling him to take the lead and win by over 30 seconds. His performance was contrasted with that of his team-mate Bottas, who spun four times and finished a lap down in 14th place. Hamilton cited the race as his "stand-out" performance of the season.

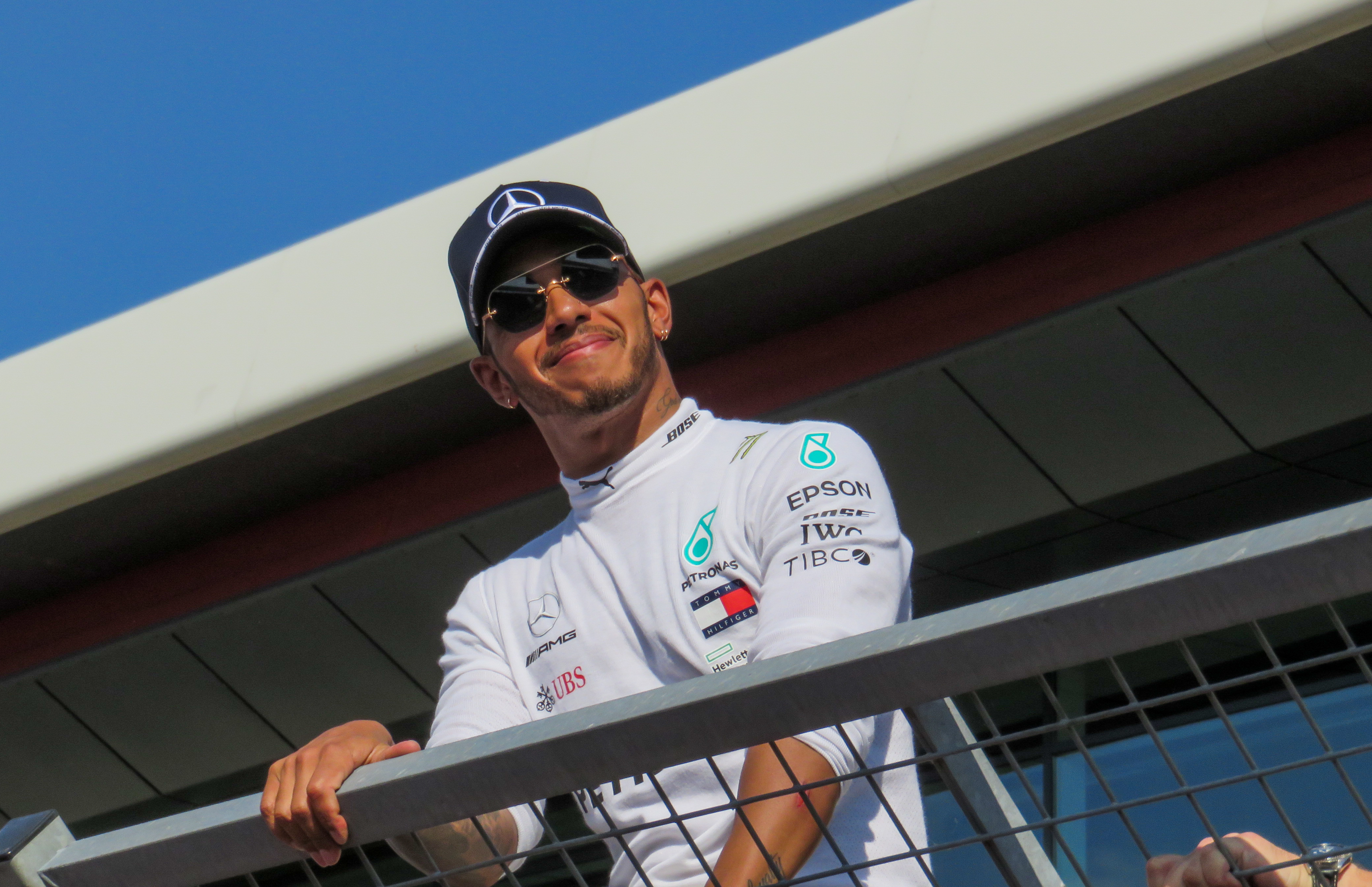
Hamilton is the most successful driver in Formula One history, holding the most major driver records.

Ayrton Senna was a major influence on Hamilton's driving style; he recalled: "I think it's partly because I watched [him] when I was young and I thought 'this is how I want to drive when I get the opportunity' and I went out there and tried it on the kart track. My whole approach to racing has developed from there." He has been compared to Senna in raw speed. In 2010, Hamilton drove Senna's original title-winning McLaren MP4/4 as part of a tribute documentary by the BBC motoring show Top Gear. In the documentary, along with fellow racing drivers, he named Senna as the number one driver ever.

Earlier in his career, Hamilton was criticised for being hot-headed at times, as demonstrated when he was disqualified in Imola in the GP2 Series for overtaking the safety car, something he went on to repeat four years later in Formula One at the 2010 European Grand Prix in Valencia. Following his move to Mercedes, Hamilton was credited with demonstrating greater maturity, while maintaining his ruthlessness and aggression. The official Formula One website describes him as "invariably a fierce but fair fighter".

=== Reception ===
As a driver he is absolutely outstanding – as good as there's ever been. Apart from the talent, he's a good guy, he gets out on the street and supports and promotes Formula One. He is box office, 100 per cent.

— Bernie Ecclestone, speaking of Hamilton in 2015

Hamilton has been described as the best driver of his generation, and one of the greatest Formula One drivers including by Chase Carey and Martin Brundle. Several Formula One drivers and experts have described Hamilton as the greatest Formula One driver of all time. (Note: These include former Jordan team boss Eddie Jordan, ex-drivers Eddie Irvine, Johnny Herbert, Damon Hill, David Coulthard, and John Watson, rivals Nico Rosberg, Sebastian Vettel, and Max Verstappen, Formula E driver Sam Bird, and ex-commentator Murray Walker.) Writing in Autocar, Jim Holden suggested Hamilton might not only be among the greatest British drivers in Formula One but one of the greatest British sportsmen. Amongst receiving plaudits from experts and fans in and out of the sport, Hamilton has been a divisive figure in the eyes of the general public, with some journalists arguing his exploits on the track have been underappreciated. Holden has suggested that racial bias may have contributed towards Hamilton's perceived lack of popularity relative to his achievements, with Hamilton's race and physical appearance—being mixed-race and often seen sporting earrings, braids and designer clothing—alienating some of the sport's traditional white, elderly male fanbase. Others have attributed his lack of appreciation to the perceived predictability of results during the turbo-hybrid era, likening his period of dominance to that of Schumacher in the early 2000s, and to tennis players Steffi Graf and Martina Navratilova, all of whom became more appreciated in the latter part of their careers.

What strikes me now about him now is his maturity ... [Hamilton] recognises he is a role model and the influence he has and the responsibilities that come with it. He is far broader than purely a driver in [Formula One]. He has opinions about the environment, young people, fashion and music. That is part of the greater appeal of Lewis today.

— David Richards, chairman of Motorsport UK, speaking of Hamilton in 2019

Hamilton's jet-set lifestyle and interests outside Formula One have been scrutinised. He has been praised for disregarding convention and public opinion and has been described as one of the last superstar drivers. Between race weekends Hamilton has on several occasions travelled around the world to explore a variety of interests, such as in 2018 where, after winning the Italian Grand Prix, Hamilton flew to Shanghai and New York where he released his own designer clothing line with Tommy Hilfiger, before flying immediately back to, and winning, the next race in Singapore. His Mercedes team-boss Toto Wolff has been vocal in his support for Hamilton's off-track pursuits, explaining how freedom allows Hamilton to function at his best.

Figures in the sport, such as Emerson Fittipaldi and Christian Horner, have voiced their support for Hamilton's ability to connect with fans, while Bernie Ecclestone frequently commented on his admiration of Hamilton's ability to promote the sport, observing how he is happy to engage with fans, unlike some of his peers. In 2019, The Telegraph sports journalist Luke Slater went as far as to argue that "[t]here have been few better representatives of the sport than Hamilton ... [both] on and off the track." Following Hamilton's knighthood in 2020, newly appointed Formula One CEO Stefano Domenicali said that Hamilton is "a true giant of our sport" and that "his influence is huge both in and out of a car".

He was able to win with a dominant car, with a good car like 2010 or 2012, or with bad cars like 2009 and 2011. Not all the champions can say that.

— Fernando Alonso, speaking of Hamilton in 2017

A prodigious talent as a teenager, Hamilton established himself as one of the world's best drivers following his record-breaking rookie year. Paddy Lowe has suggested that "he turned out to be the best rookie there has ever been" and that "his first half-season is just the most extraordinary in history." After his first world title a year later, many people considered Hamilton the best driver of his generation. Following Red Bull and Sebastian Vettel's four-year dominance of the sport, Hamilton's resolve was tested both professionally and personally as he did not finish higher than fourth in the Drivers' Championship from 2009 to 2013, leading some to question his status as the best driver in the sport. In spite of this, Hamilton's less successful years with McLaren have also been cited as a demonstration of driving ability as Hamilton has won at least one race in fifteen consecutive seasons, attracting high praise from experts and fellow drivers for extracting race-winning performances from cars that were not dominant.

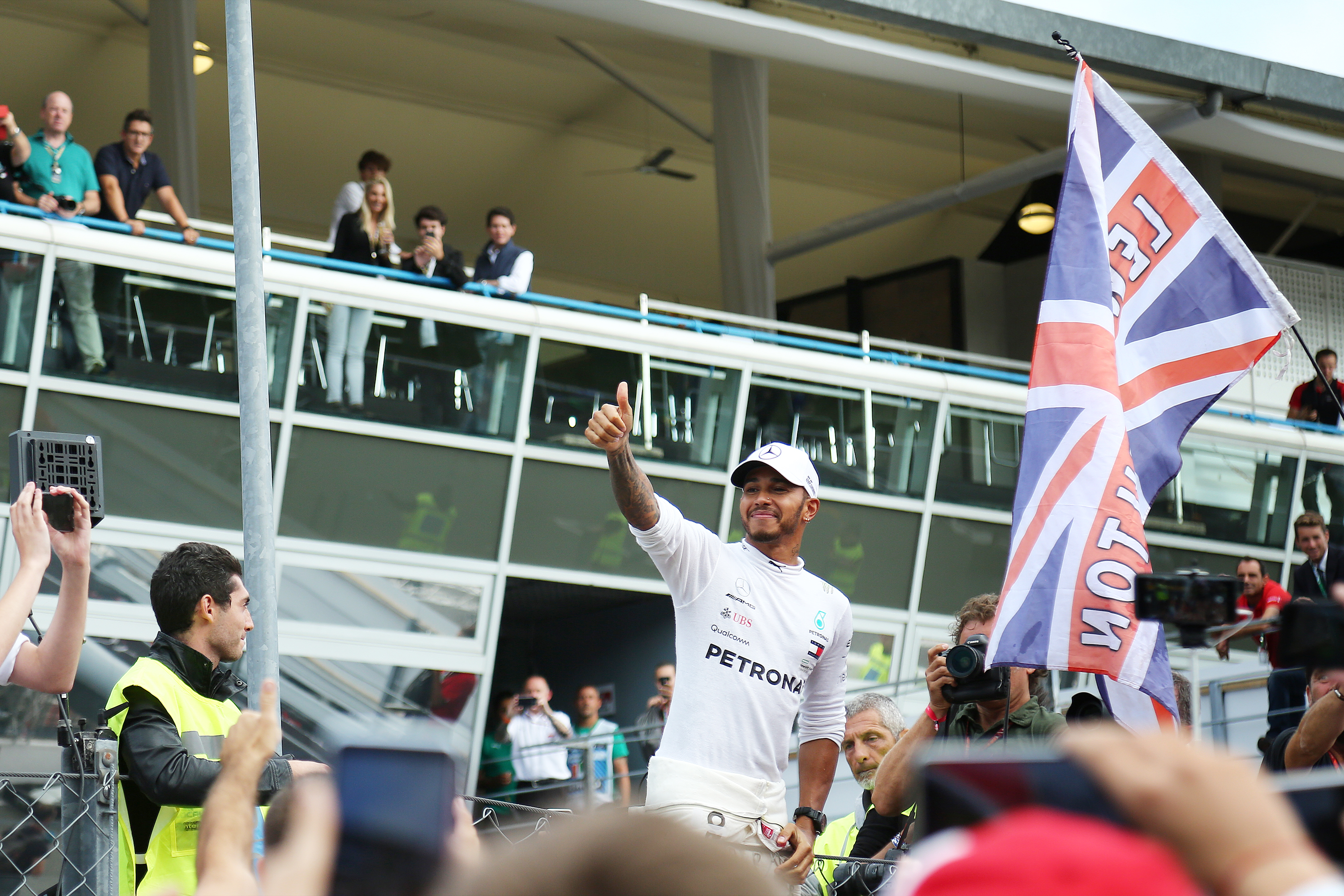
Hamilton waving to fans after winning the 2018 Italian Grand Prix

After Hamilton clinched his second and third World Championship titles with Mercedes in 2014 and 2015, David Coulthard declared Hamilton the best driver of his generation, calling him "the Ayrton Senna of his era". As Hamilton became more widely considered the best driver of his era, public and expert debate moved from his status in modern Formula One to his status among the greatest drivers in history. The next few seasons saw Hamilton eclipse a number of records, including achieving the most all-time pole positions ahead of Michael Schumacher, leading him to be regarded by some as the greatest qualifier in history. After winning his fourth and fifth world titles, Hamilton's place among the greats of the sport became firmly established in the opinions of experts, rivals, and teammates alike, including among others Fernando Alonso, Carlos Sainz Jr., Felipe Massa, Gerhard Berger, and Ross Brawn. Some journalists and pundits also consider the possibility of Hamilton being the greatest Formula One driver of all time.

Following Hamilton clinching a sixth World Drivers' Championship title in 2019, ex-Formula One driver and pundit Johnny Herbert acclaimed Hamilton as the greatest driver ever, while Formula One staff writer Greg Stuart described Hamilton as "arguably the most complete Formula [One] driver ever". After Hamilton won his seventh title in 2020, John Watson stated that Hamilton "is, by a million miles, the greatest driver of his generation and you can argue he will go on to be the greatest Formula One driver of all time", and highlighted his fearlessness as being key to his success, as evidenced by his performance against double world champion team-mate Alonso in his rookie season and his decision to leave McLaren for Mercedes.

=== Helmet ===
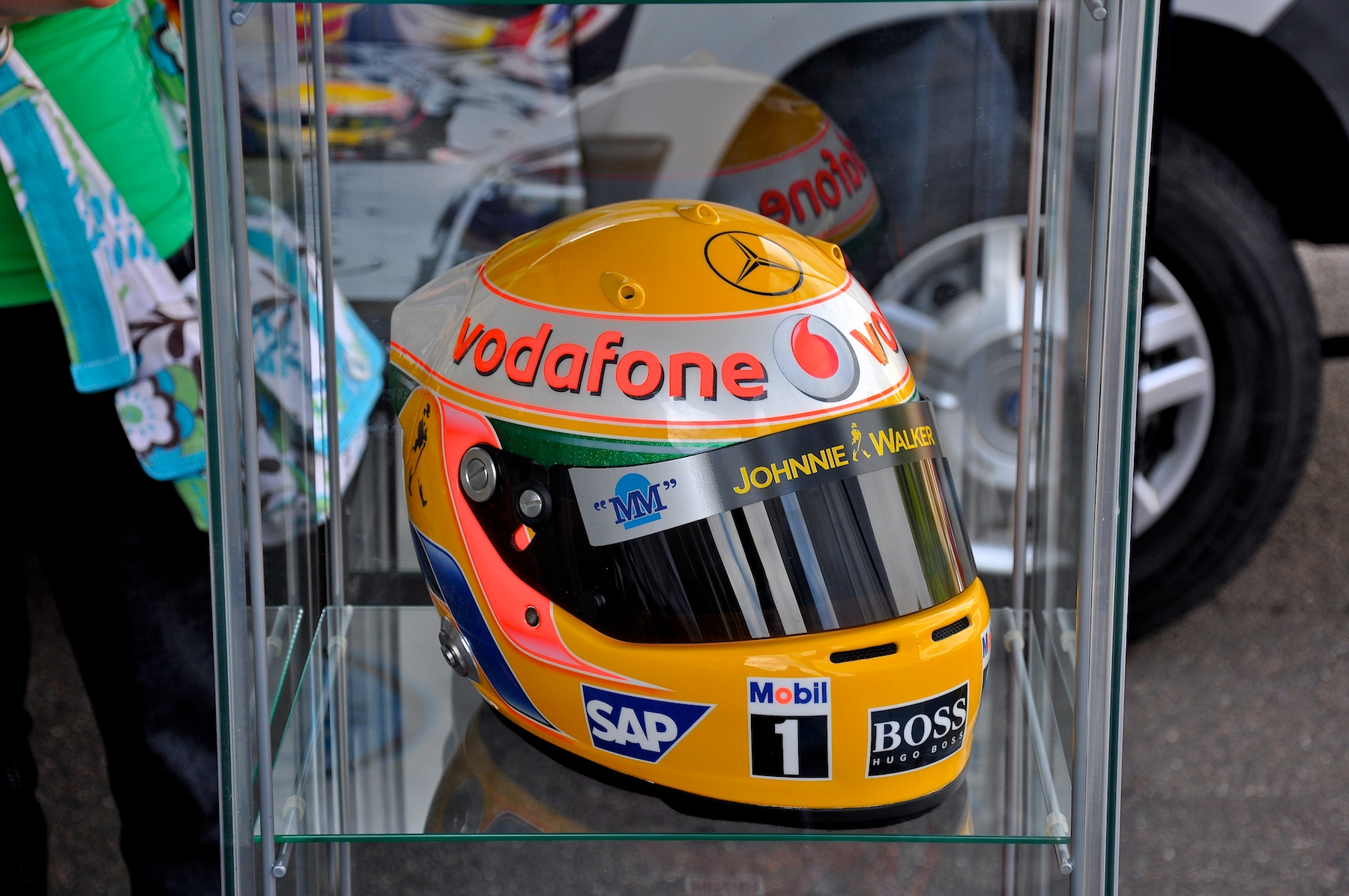
Hamilton's 2007 helmet for McLaren

From a young age, Hamilton's helmet throughout his karting years was predominantly yellow with blue, green and red ribbons. In later years, a white ring was added and the ribbons were moved forward to make room for logos and advertisement space. Hamilton continued to run a yellow design throughout the early stages of his Formula One career, but in 2014 decided to switch to a white design with three red ribbons on the side. In 2016, Hamilton added three stars beneath the ribbons, representing each of his World Drivers' Championships. Hamilton selected his helmet design from fan submissions in 2017; the winning design used a white and yellow base colour with red and orange details. Over the following seasons, Hamilton began a tradition of adding more stars to his helmet upon winning each title. Having switched back to a 2014-inspired white-and-red design in 2018, Hamilton opted for a different colour palette in 2020, which used matte black as base colour with purple details; he later added a Black Lives Matter emblem to the lid, in support of the movement. In 2022, he moved to a fluorescent yellow design, retaining the purple details and championship stars. Upon signing with Ferrari in 2025, Hamilton reverted to a design reminiscent of the early stages of his Formula One career, featuring yellow as the base colour along with red accents and championship stars, complemented by the Ferrari emblem replacing the Mercedes logo.

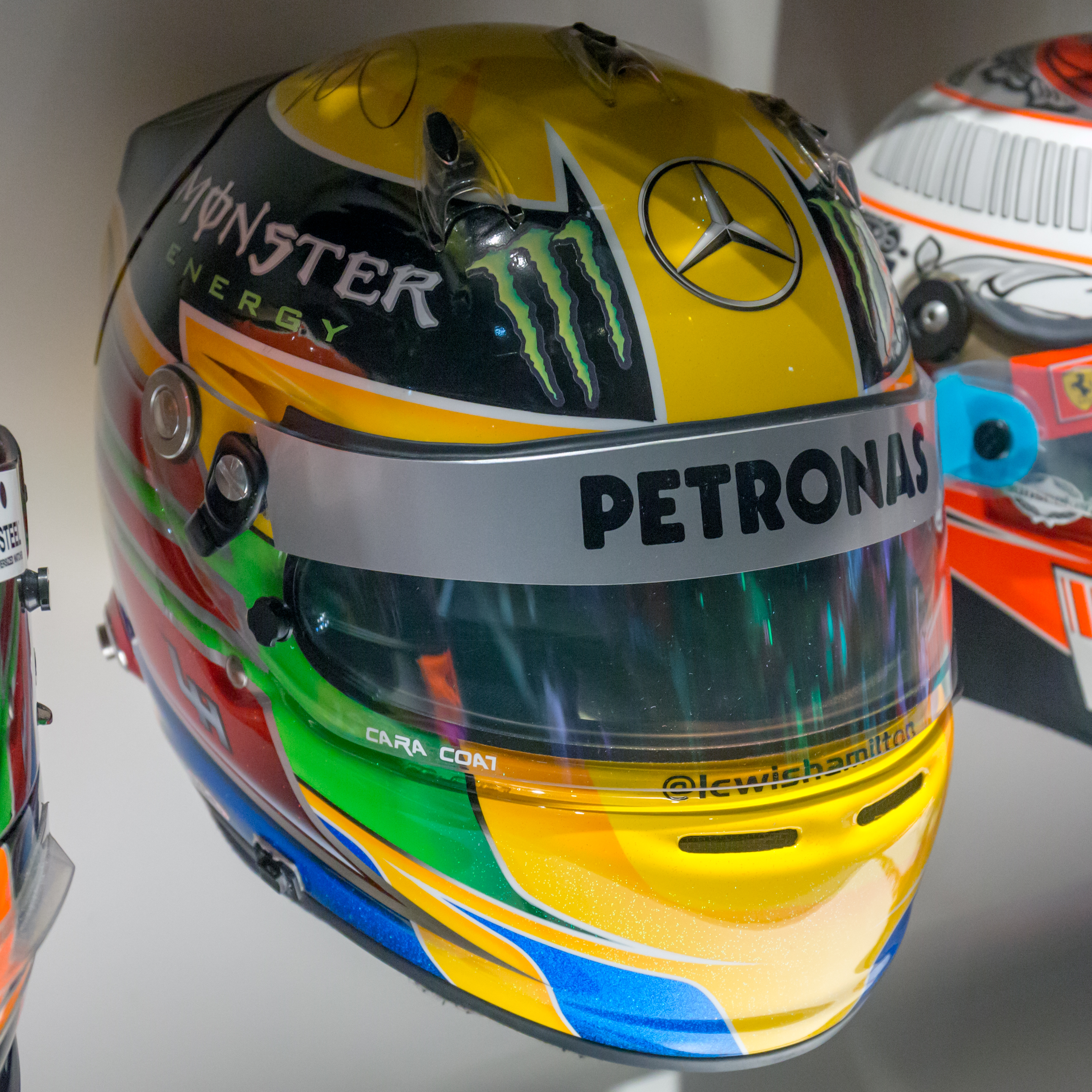
Hamilton's first Mercedes helmet in 2013, featuring colour ribbons moved forward

Hamilton has used several one-off helmet designs across his career. Hamilton sported gold helmets for season finales three times in his career. After winning his fourth title in 2017, he entered the 2017 Abu Dhabi Grand Prix in a gold helmet with four stars adorning the top of the helmet with the words "World Champion". He used similar designs in 2018 and 2019 with five and six stars, respectively. This practice altered in 2020, when Hamilton wore his base helmet with gold outlines and accents, instead of a full gold design.

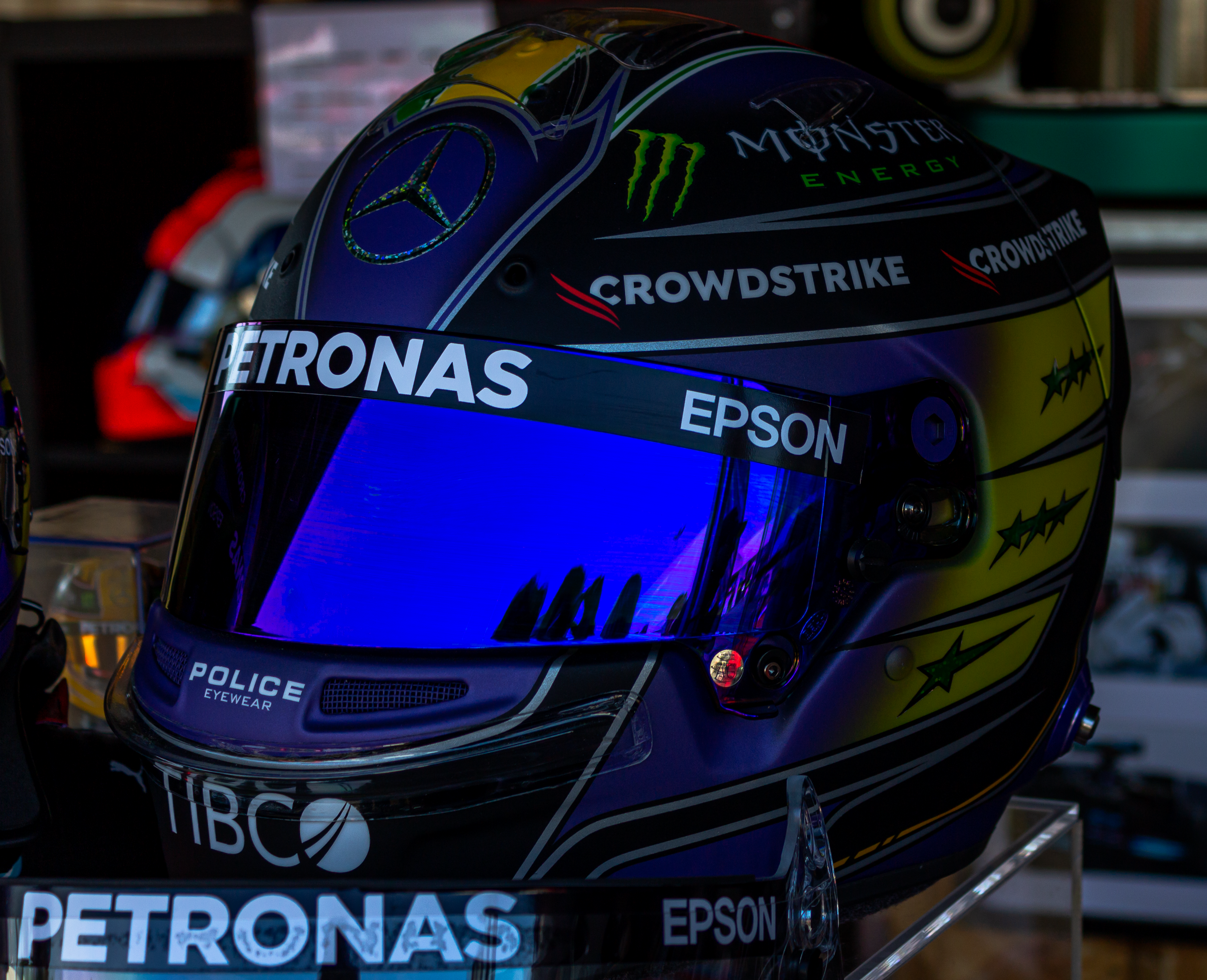
Hamilton's special helmet design used for the 2021 São Paulo Grand Prix

Hamilton has also used one-off helmet designs to pay tribute to his influential figures. He has continuously brought special helmet designs to Brazilian Grands Prix, in tribute to Ayrton Senna. Prior to the 2019 Monaco Grand Prix, three-time world champion and Mercedes team personnel Niki Lauda, who played pivotal role in Hamilton's move to Mercedes, died. In tribute, Hamilton wore a special helmet design featuring Lauda's classic red-and-white palette with his name printed on the back, honoring the influence Lauda had on his career. Other notable special designs include his rainbow helmet designs—used during the Qatar, Saudi Arabian and Abu Dhabi Grands Prix of 2021—in support of LGBTQ rights in the Middle East. Hamilton used unique designs for the Japanese Grand Prix in 2022 and 2023, designed by Japanese artists Takashi Murakami and Hajime Sorayama, respectively.

=== Rivalries ===
==== Fernando Alonso ====
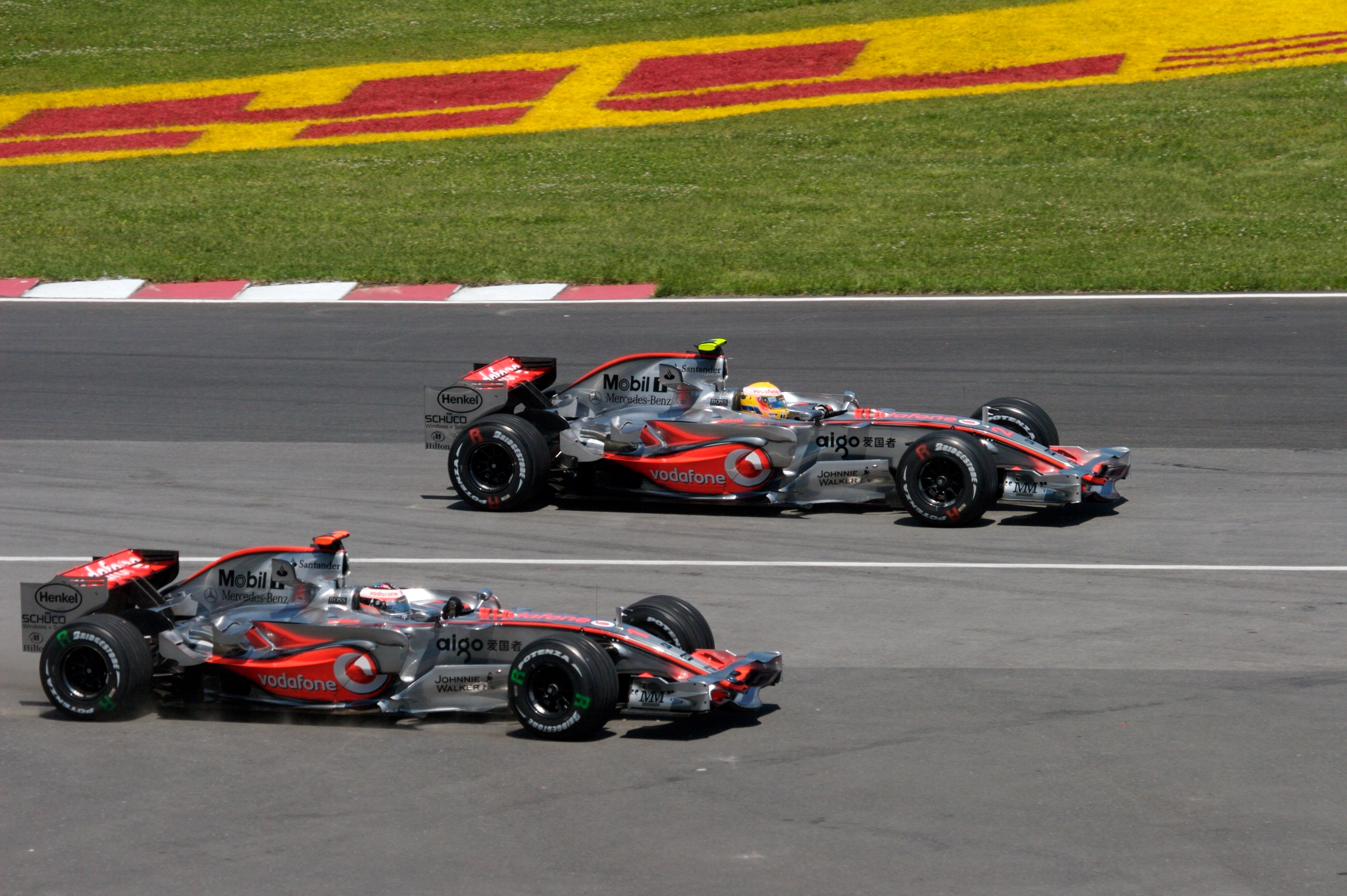
Alonso (left) and Hamilton (right) at the 2007 Canadian Grand Prix

Hamilton's debut season saw him partner two-time and defending World Champion Fernando Alonso. In their time as teammates, tensions arose between the two drivers and McLaren as a result of several incidents. The first tensions surfaced after Hamilton finished second behind Alonso at Monaco in 2007. After post-race comments made by Hamilton, which suggested he had been forced into a supporting role, the FIA investigated whether McLaren had broken rules by enforcing team orders. McLaren denied favouring Alonso, and the FIA subsequently vindicated the team, stating that "McLaren were able to pursue an optimum team strategy because they had a substantial advantage over all other cars ... nothing which could be described as interfering with the race result."

Tensions resurfaced at the 2007 Hungarian Grand Prix, where during the final qualifying session Hamilton went out on track ahead of Alonso and ignored requests from the team to let him through: the two drivers had been taking turns on a race-by-race basis to lead during qualifying, which gave the leading driver an edge due to the fuel load regulations then in place, and Alonso was due to lead in Hungary. Hamilton was then delayed in the pits by Alonso and thus unable to set a final lap time before the end of the session. Alonso was relegated to sixth place on the starting grid thus promoting Hamilton, who had qualified second, to first, while McLaren was docked Constructors' Championship points. Hamilton said he thought the penalty was "quite light if anything" and only regretted the loss of points. Hamilton was reported to have sworn at Dennis on the team radio following the incident. British motorsport journal Autosport claimed that this "[led] Dennis to throw his headphones on the pit wall in disgust: a gesture that was misinterpreted by many to be in reaction to Alonso's pole"; however, McLaren later issued a statement on behalf of Hamilton that denied the use of any profanity.

As a result of the events over the 2007 season, the relationship between Hamilton and Alonso reportedly collapsed, with the pair not on speaking terms for a short period. In the aftermath it was reported that Hamilton had been targeted by Luca di Montezemolo regarding a Ferrari drive for 2008. The rivalry between the pair led to speculation that either Hamilton or Alonso would leave McLaren at the end of the season; Alonso and McLaren terminated their contract by mutual consent in November that year, ending his and Hamilton's time as teammates. In subsequent years, tensions between the pair dissipated, and the mutual respect has grown, with Alonso praising Hamilton in 2017 saying "[Hamilton] was able to win with a dominant car, with a good car like 2010 or 2012, or with bad cars like 2009 and 2011. Not all the champions can say that." Alonso later described Hamilton as one of the top five greatest drivers of all time. On the cool-down lap after Alonso's final race before his two-year hiatus in 2018, Hamilton joined Sebastian Vettel in paying tribute to Alonso by driving, each on one side, in a formation to the start-finish straight where all three executed donuts.

Teammates Hamilton and Alonso won eight of 17 races held. Both drivers achieved four victories and 12 podium finishes, whilst Hamilton outqualified Alonso ten of 17 times. At the end of their season as teammates, the pair were tied on 109 points, with Hamilton placing second and Alonso third in the World Drivers' Championship by virtue of Hamilton having more second-place finishes.

==== Nico Rosberg ====
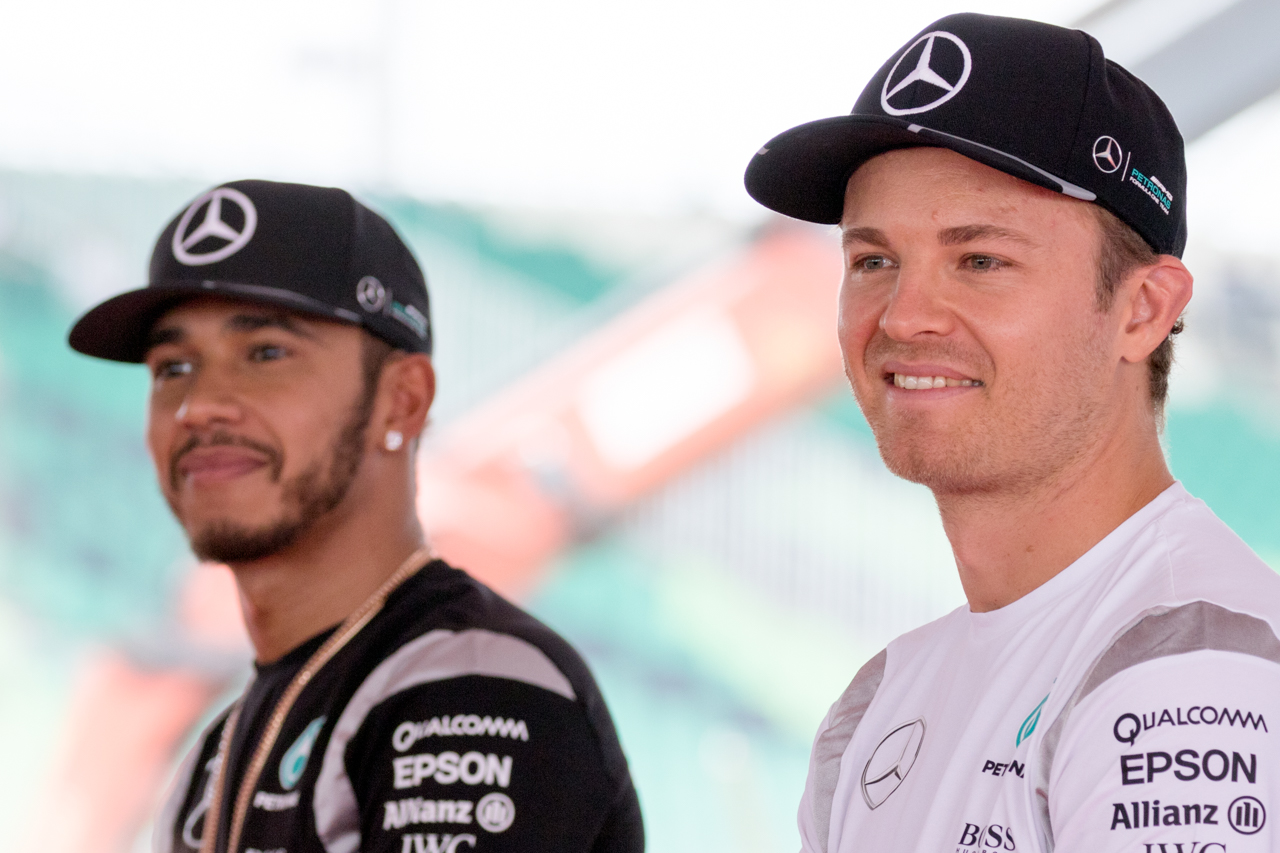
Hamilton (left) and Rosberg (right) at the 2016 Malaysian Grand Prix

When Hamilton joined Mercedes in 2013, he was paired alongside old karting teammate and friend Nico Rosberg. Over their four seasons as teammates, a period of Mercedes dominance in Formula One, the pair's relationship became strained and, at times, led to volatile confrontations on and off the track. Hamilton and Rosberg were first teammates in 2000, when they were in karting. They raced for Mercedes-Benz McLaren in Formula A, where Hamilton became European champion, with Rosberg not far behind. Robert Kubica, who raced with them before Formula One, recalled how they were competitive both on and off the track, saying that "they would even have races to eat pizza, always eating two at a time." Sports journalist Paul Weaver contrasts their upbringings; Rosberg was born in Germany and raised in Monaco as the son of 1982 World Drivers' Champion Keke Rosberg, whereas Hamilton was raised on a council estate in Stevenage to a father who worked multiple jobs to fund his son's early karting career.

Pundit and commentator Will Buxton compared the character and driving styles of the pair, labelling Hamilton as the faster driver with more natural ability, as well as an intellect to match Rosberg's. Buxton wrote:

Man to man against Rosberg, I can't recall a single race this year where in the same machinery Hamilton's fuel usage has been higher. He has made his tires last. He has had to fight from the back of the field time and again (think Germany, think Hungary) and yet he hasn't overworked his tires, he hasn't used too much fuel. He has learned how to drive these new cars, and to extract the most from them using the least ... Far from the unintelligent chancer many paint Hamilton to be, he is proving to be the intellectual match of his teammate and, the better racer to boot.

Their old karting boss, Dino Chiesa, said Hamilton was the faster driver whereas Rosberg, who once said to Chiesa "everything relates to physics and maths", was always more analytical. This led some to believe that Rosberg would achieve greater success in Formula One, the highest level of open-wheel racing, due to the intellectual capacity required to manage brakes, energy harvesting, tyre management, and moderate fuel usage. Hamilton's tyre management has frequently allowed him to push on for longer, often enabling optimum race strategies, and his fuel usage has regularly been better than almost anyone on the grid. Sky Sport's Mark Hughes, commented: "Rosberg has a more scientific methodology, looks to fine-tune more specifically than Hamilton who typically tends just to find a balance he can work with, then adapt his driving around it."

In their time together as teammates, Hamilton and Rosberg won 54 of 78 races over four seasons. Hamilton had 32 victories, 55 podium finishes, and qualified ahead of Rosberg 42 times, while Rosberg had 22 victories, 50 podium finishes, and qualified ahead of Hamilton 36 times. During this period, Hamilton won two World Championship titles to Rosberg's one, and scored more points in three out of their four seasons together.

==== Sebastian Vettel ====
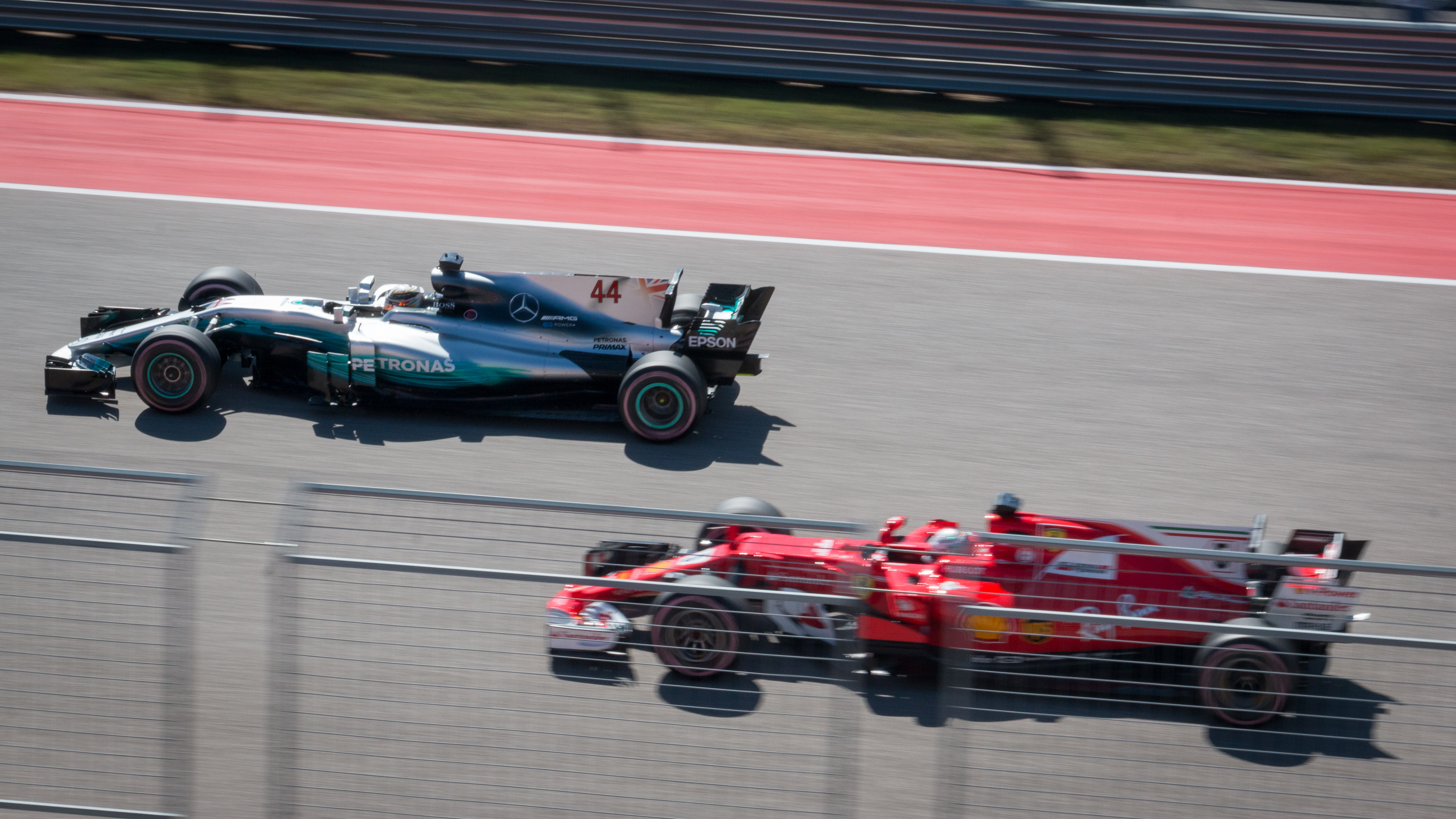
Hamilton (left) and Vettel (right) at the 2017 United States Grand Prix

Hamilton describes his rivalry with Sebastian Vettel as his favourite, believing their battles helped bring them closer together. After three years of Mercedes's dominance from 2014 to 2016, Ferrari produced a car that was capable of fighting for the championship in 2017 and 2018. Vettel, who was then driving for Ferrari, enjoyed an early lead on points, but Mercedes and Hamilton fought back to reduce point deficits and ultimately won the championships in both seasons. While there were some on-track flash points, most notably the 2017 Azerbaijan Grand Prix, when Vettel accused Hamilton of brake checking and drove into Hamilton in retaliation, earning a penalty, the pair developed a strong mutual respect in a hard but fairly contested fight. In 2021, Hamilton recalled:

Mine and Seb's battle were my favourite so far. It's knowing I was racing against an incredible driver, not only that but a great man in Seb who is a four-time world champion and we were racing against another team, he was at Ferrari who were very strong at the time. It took a lot out of both of us in that period of time, to remain focused to deliver weekend in, weekend out. That was a difficult period for us and it brought us closer, because the respect we have between us is huge.

=== Public image and influence ===
==== Racist treatment ====
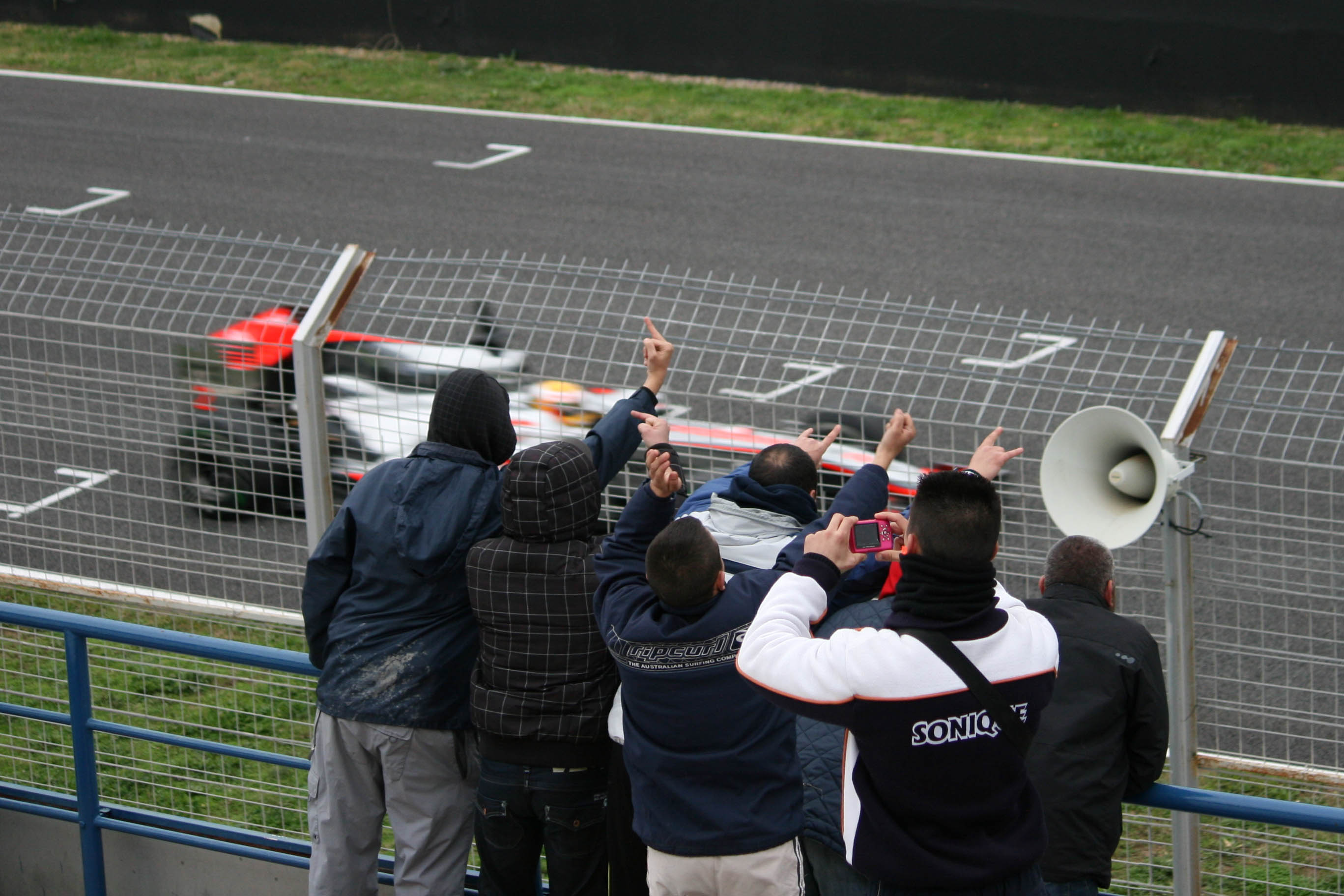
Hamilton was racially abused by fans during 2010 pre-season testing at Jerez.

The first and, as of 2026, the only black driver to race in Formula One, Hamilton has been subject to racist abuse throughout his career. In 2007, Hamilton suffered racist abuse from Spanish Formula One supporters at the Chinese Grand Prix. In 2008, Hamilton was heckled and otherwise abused during pre-season testing at the Circuit de Catalunya by several Spanish spectators who wore black face paint and black wigs, as well as shirts bearing the words "Hamilton's familly [sic]". The FIA warned Spanish authorities about the repetition of such behaviour, and launched a "Race Against Racism" campaign. Shortly before the 2008 Brazilian Grand Prix, a website owned by the Spanish branch of the New York-based advertising agency TBWA and named pinchalaruedadeHamilton, which translates into English as "burst Hamilton's tyre", was featured in the British media. The site contained an image of Interlagos that allowed users to leave nails and porcupines on the track for Hamilton's car to run over. Among thousands of comments left since 2007, some included racial insults. In 2021, Hamilton was subjected to online racist abuse following a controversial win at the British Grand Prix. Mercedes, Formula One, and the FIA issued a joint statement condemning the abuse and called for those responsible to be held accountable.

Hamilton's treatment by the media and critics has, at times, been criticised as being racist. In 2014, The Guardian journalist Joseph Harker highlighted double-standards in Hamilton's treatment compared to other British drivers by British newspapers, suggesting that his skin colour has played a factor in a perceived lack of acceptance among the British public. In 2019, footballer Rio Ferdinand described media scrutiny of Hamilton as having "racist undertones" and contrasted Hamilton's treatment to that of fellow British driver Jenson Button. At the start of his Formula One career, Hamilton said that he "tried to ignore the fact [he] was the first black guy ever to race in the sport" but later stated that he had since grown to "appreciate the implications", and changed his approach to promote equality within the sport. In 2019, Toto Wolff, Hamilton's team boss at Mercedes, described how Hamilton was "scarred for life" by racist abuse inflicted during his childhood.

==== Media reception ====
In December 2018, Stevenage-born Hamilton caused controversy at the BBC Sports Personality of the Year Awards where he said on live television, "It really was a dream for us all as a family to do something different. For us to get out of the slums" before immediately correcting himself, saying, "Well, not the slums, but to get out of somewhere and do something. We all set our goals very, very high but we did it as a team." While Hamilton immediately sought to correct his remarks, the leader of Stevenage Borough Council described the comments as "disappointing" and observed that people felt "very offended". Hamilton posted a video on Instagram in which he apologised for his comments, saying: "I'm super proud of where I come from and I hope you know that I represent in the best way I can always ... Particularly when you are up in front of a crowd, trying to find the right words to express the long journey you've had in life, I chose the wrong words." The town mayor subsequently accepted his "gracious apology".

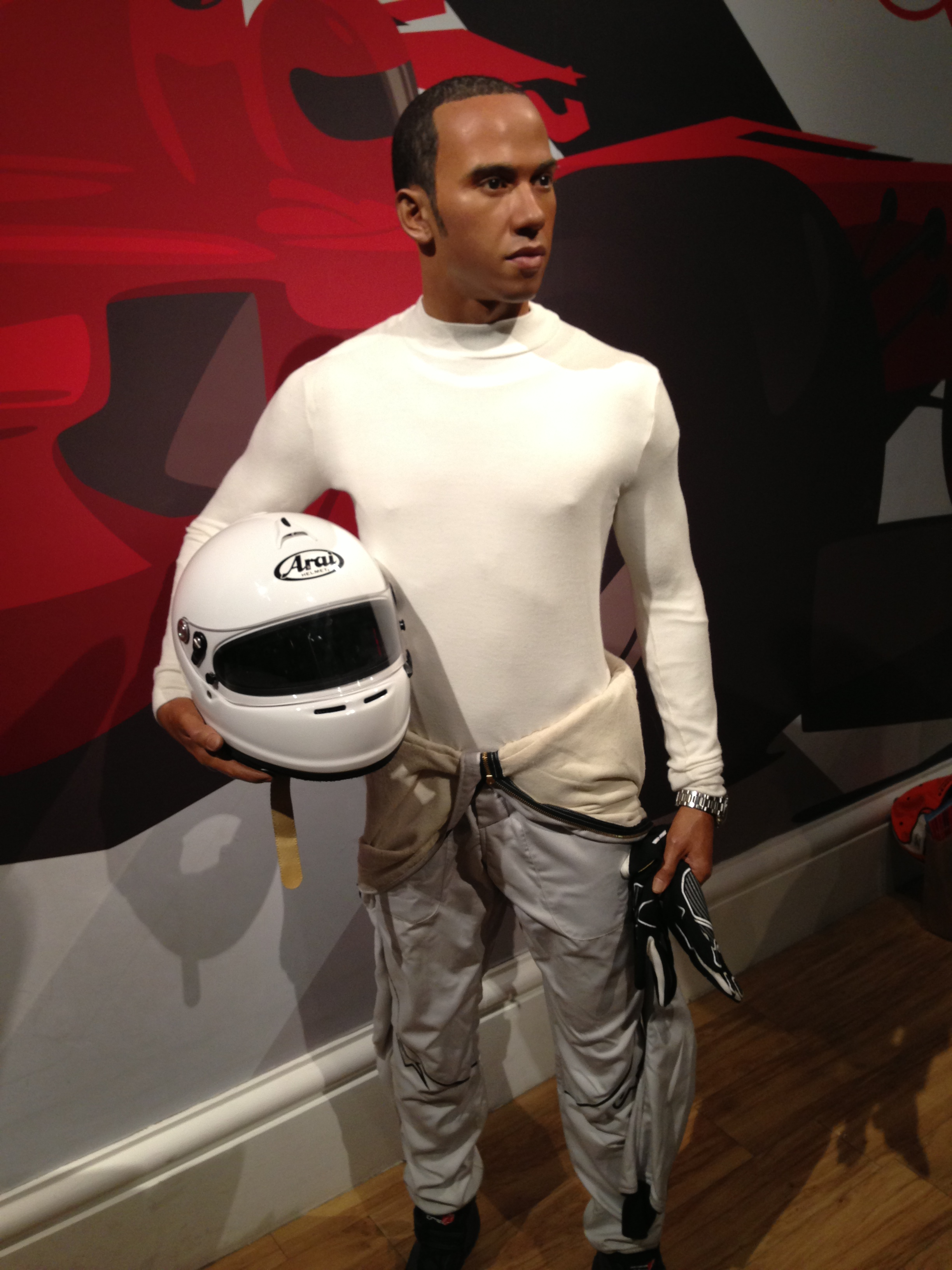
Waxwork of Hamilton at Madame Tussauds, London

Hamilton's contribution and influence has been recognised regularly in the Powerlist, an annual list of the most influential Black Britons, in which he has ranked in the top 10 in 2016 and 2017. In 2021, Hamilton was named the most influential Black Briton in the 14th Powerlist, for his sporting success and his advocacy in the Black Lives Matter movement. In 2020, he was listed as one of Time magazine's 100 most influential people globally, and was knighted in the 2021 New Year Honours for services to motorsports.

Hamilton was one of several figures whose tax arrangements were singled out in a report by the charity Christian Aid in 2008. That year, Hamilton received criticism from members of parliament for avoiding UK taxes. Following the leak of the Paradise Papers in November 2017, it was reported that Hamilton had avoided paying £3.3 million of value added tax (VAT) on his private jet, worth £16.5 million. According to BBC Panorama, the leasing deal set up by his advisers appeared to be "artificial" and "did not comply with an EU and UK ban on VAT refunds for private use". The BBC also said that Hamilton's Instagram account provided evidence that the jet was used for personal trips. The jet was sold in September 2019. Whilst not residing in the UK, HMRC data published in 2019 puts Hamilton among the top 5,000 highest UK tax payers. Hamilton told The Sunday Times in 2014: "What people don't realise is that I pay tax here [in the UK], but I don't earn all my money here. I race in 19 different countries, so I earn my money in 20 different places and I pay tax in several different places, and I pay a lot [in the UK] as well. I am contributing to the country."

At 41 years old, Hamilton remains tied to Ferrari by a multi-year contract running through the end of 2027. He has publicly indicated his opinion that he has no plans to retire until he fulfills his goal of seeing Formula One return to a race track on the African continent. Outside of motorsports, Hamilton is a prominent advocate of part-time global diversity and equality, for being the founder of the premium non-alcoholic agave spirit brand Almave.

== Other ventures ==
=== Activism and philanthropy ===
==== Diversity and anti-racism ====
People come up to me from different ethnic backgrounds saying, "My kid wants to be you one day", and I can assure you that when I started racing, there weren't people from those [ethnic backgrounds]. I take great pride in that.

— Hamilton in 2017 commenting on his influence on minority representation in motorsport

Hamilton is a prominent advocate against racism and for increased diversity in motorsport. In 2011—after being summoned to the stewards in five of the opening six rounds—Hamilton quipped, "maybe it's because I'm black, that's what Ali G says." In 2018, Hamilton criticised the lack of diversity in Formula One, stating "nothing's changed" in the 11 years since his debut.

As part of the U.S. national anthem protests, Hamilton took the knee before every Grand Prix he entered in 2020, in support of Black Lives Matter, and wore t-shirts promoting racial justice. Following the murder of George Floyd in May 2020, Hamilton criticised prominent figures in Formula One for their silence on the issue, writing on Instagram:

I see those of you who are staying silent, some of you the biggest of stars [sic] yet you stay silent in the midst of injustice. Not a sign from anybody in my industry which of course is a white dominated sport. I'm one of the only people of colour there yet I stand alone. [...] I would have thought by now you would see why this happens and say something about it but you can't stand alongside us. Just know I know who you are and I see you. [...] We are not born with racism and hate in our hearts, it is taught by those we look up to.

Following Hamilton's comments, several drivers and team executives reciprocated his views. Ross Brawn, managing director for Formula One, stated that the organisation "supports [Hamilton] totally", describing Hamilton as "a great ambassador for the sport". During the 2020 Tuscan Grand Prix weekend, including on the podium, Hamilton wore a t-shirt stating "arrest the cops who killed Breonna Taylor". Following an investigation, the FIA barred drivers from wearing unofficial attire on the podium and in media interviews. In anticipation of the FIA's decision, Hamilton said that he recognised that they have "certain limits that they feel that they have to work within", but he "[didn't] regret a single moment of it" and appreciated the "really positive support from the fans".

In June 2020, Hamilton established The Hamilton Commission with the Royal Academy of Engineering, tasked with finding ways for motorsport to engage more black people with STEM subjects and increase employment in motorsport or other engineering sectors. In May 2021, Hamilton became the inaugural recipient of the Laureus Athlete Advocate of the Year Award. Hamilton founded Mission 44 in July 2021, a charity designed to help young people from under-represented backgrounds achieve their ambitions in wider society. Hamilton pledged £20 million to support the work of the charity. Mission 44 collaborates with a joint foundation between Hamilton and Mercedes called Ignite, which was also launched in July. Ignite focuses on increasing diversity in motorsport by improving opportunities in education and offering financial support.

==== Human rights ====
In December 2020, Hamilton confronted human rights in Bahrain and spoke out on allegations of sportswashing. Hamilton said he "won't let it go unnoticed" after an 11-year-old boy wrote a letter to Hamilton asking him to save his father, who was facing the death penalty after making an alleged forced confession. Hamilton discussed the case with human rights organisations and legal experts, as well as Bahraini officials. He stated that whilst he has no authority over where he competes, drivers should not "[go] to these countries and just [ignore] what is happening".

Hamilton is also a supporter of LGBTQ rights, and strongly criticised the Hungarian government before the 2021 Hungarian Grand Prix for their anti-LGBTQ law. He also called out LGBTQ rights in Saudi Arabia before the inaugural Saudi Arabian Grand Prix, describing them as "terrifying".

In 2024, Hamilton publicly called for a permanent ceasefire in the Gaza war and expressed support for Palestinians affected by the conflict. He subsequently continued to speak about the humanitarian situation in Gaza. In September 2025, he described the situation in Gaza as a genocide, citing a report by a United Nations commission of inquiry, and called on his followers to donate to humanitarian organisations. In December 2025, Hamilton visited Jordan with the British Red Cross to observe humanitarian operations supporting people in Gaza and donated to its crisis appeal. In September 2026, Hamilton expressed his support for Macklemore after the rapper was dropped from Ed Sheeran's US tour due to his pro-Palestinian remarks. Commenting on Macklemore's Instagram post, Hamilton wrote: “Thank you for using your voice, standing with you.” In November 2026, Hamilton visited Egypt's Rafah Border crossing, as well as logistics warehouses operated by the Egyptian Red Crescent. Following his visit, he called on Israel to allow aid trucks into Gaza, saying there was "No excuse. I don’t want us to get used to their suffering. I don’t want us to look away.” He has often shared on social media about children harmed in airstrikes and has called for a ceasefire.

==== Environmental and animal rights ====
Hamilton has discussed environmental issues and animal rights in press conferences, interviews and documentaries. He has also used his social media platforms to gather support for his initiatives, which have included urging China to reclassify dogs as pets instead of livestock, backing charities against wildlife smuggling, and calling for the protection of the Amazon rainforest.

In January 2020, Hamilton donated US$500,000 to causes relating to bushfires in Australia. He later announced his aim of being carbon neutral by the end of the year, explaining that he had mandated that his office and household use recyclable items, sold his private jet, and planned to reduce his use of aircraft.

==== UNICEF and #TOGETHERBAND ====
In 2012, Hamilton began working with the United Nations Children's Fund (UNICEF). In March 2012, Hamilton travelled to the Philippines where he made a short film about Manila's street children. The film was shown on ITV1 during Soccer Aid and helped raise over £4.9 million for UNICEF. In October 2012, while in India for the Grand Prix, Hamilton visited a UNICEF-funded newborn care unit and nutrition centre. Hamilton said: "As a sportsman in the public eye, I know I have a role to play in helping to tell the stories of the world's most vulnerable children and I jumped at the chance to be able to do that again after a visit to Manila."

In 2014, Hamilton travelled to Haiti where he made a short film about child malnutrition. The film was shown on ITV1 during Soccer Aid, and helped raise over £6 million for UNICEF. In 2015, Hamilton took part in an exhibition to highlight UNICEF's work and to celebrate its twenty-year partnership with Starwood Hotels. In June 2017, Hamilton joined the Super Dads initiative, a special UNICEF campaign that highlighted the critical role played by fathers in early childhood development. In August 2017, Hamilton visited Havana with UNICEF to learn more about its first development programmes in Cuba.

In 2020, Hamilton partnered with charity campaign #TOGETHERBAND to help promote the United Nations' 17 Global Goals. As part of his campaign work, Hamilton visited Alperton Community School in North West London to speak to the students about the importance of education. Hamilton is a GOAL 4 Ambassador, focusing on the fight to provide quality education to all children.

==== Other charities ====
Over the past decade, Hamilton has made time for a variety of causes, such as making donations and hospital visits to sick children. He has invited fans, young people, and their families to join him at Grand Prix races and social events. In 2013, he became the Global Education Ambassador for Save the Children, supporting and promoting its education campaigns. Two years later, Hamilton became the first ambassador for the Invictus Games Foundation, supporting wounded, injured, and sick servicemen and women. During the COVID-19 pandemic, Hamilton's Neat Burger restaurant donated free meals to frontline NHS workers. Neat Burger also launched the "Kids Eat Free" scheme, serving free meals to school children during the half-term break.

Hamilton often donates personal and professional paraphernalia for charity auctions. He auctioned a racing kart and raised over £42,000 for St Thomas' Hospital baby charity. He raised £6,411 for the Small Steps Project in 2018, and £6,000 in 2019. In 2020, he raised another £4,000 for the Small Steps Project, while a donated race suit reportedly raised €20,000 for vulnerable children. Hamilton also frequently attends charitable functions, including the amfAR gala in New York, and has supported projects and charities such as the Make-A-Wish Foundation, Comic Relief, Rays of Sunshine, Children in Need, and Stevenage's Keech Hospice Care Children's Service, among others. He is also involved in charitable work through the creation of his Lewis Hamilton Foundation. Registered in June 2008, the foundation provides grants and donations to a number of charitable causes.

=== Popular culture ===
==== Music ====
Hamilton also has interests in music, saying that "music has been a huge passion of mine since I was really young. I started playing guitar when I was 13. In here, I can be me, I can be vulnerable. I can show a side of me that people don't get to see." In 2018, he appeared on Christina Aguilera's album Liberation (2018), featuring on the song "Pipe" under the pseudonym XNDA; he did not confirm his involvement until July 2020, when he revealed he had been writing and recording music for ten years.

==== Film and television ====
During his final year with McLaren, Hamilton voiced an animated version of himself in the short series Tooned. Hamilton also made a guest appearance in Cars 2 (2011) in which he voices a version of himself as an anthropomorphic car. He then voiced a voice command assistant in Cars 3 (2017). Hamilton is credited as an executive producer for the 2018 documentary film The Game Changers. Since 2019, Hamilton appears in the Netflix documentary series Drive to Survive, with the show providing behind-the-scenes looks at the drivers, teams and the intense rivalries that drive the Formula One Championship. He has also revealed he was offered a role as a fighter pilot in the film Top Gun: Maverick (2022) by Tom Cruise but was forced to decline due to his Formula One commitments. He was one of the executive producers on Motorcycle Mary (2024), a short documentary film about Mary McGee.

In October 2022, Hamilton founded the production company Dawn Apollo Films. Its debut projects include F1 (2025), starring Brad Pitt and directed by Joseph Kosinski, and an untitled documentary film about Hamilton himself. Both projects will be co-produced by Hamilton and released on Apple TV+. The former went on to be nominated for four Academy Awards, including Best Picture, and won awards at the 98th Academy Awards, the Critics' Choice Awards and the British Academy Film Awards, while its soundtrack also won a Grammy Award. In 2026, Dawn Apollo Studios signed a first-look deal with Skydance Sports.

==== Video games ====
Hamilton served as the "maestro" of the Gran Turismo series since Gran Turismo Sport in 2017, and his Time Trial Challenge DLC pack was released for this game on 28 November 2019. In November 2023, Epic Games added a cosmetic Hamilton player skin to Fortnite. A likeness of Hamilton's dog, Roscoe, was also added to the game.

=== Fashion ===
In 2018, Hamilton launched the clothing line TommyXLewis, during New York Fashion Week, with American fashion designer Tommy Hilfiger alongside models Winnie Harlow and Hailey Baldwin. At the 2021 Met Gala, Hamilton bought a table to support up-and-coming Black designers, attending with Jamaican-American designer Edvin Thompson of Theophilio as his guest. Hamilton was one of the co-chairs of the 2025 Met Gala in Manhattan, with the theme of Superfine: Tailoring Black Style. In February 2025, Lululemon announced Hamilton as one of its brand ambassadors, including collaboration with their research and design teams as well as advocacy initiatives.

=== Business ===
In September 2019, Hamilton co-founded a vegan restaurant chain named Neat Burger; claiming to be the first international plant-based burger chain; the company—also backed by Leonardo DiCaprio—shut down in 2025 after recording over US$24 million in net losses. In August 2020, Daily Front Row listed Hamilton as one of a group of high-profile investors who purchased fashion magazine W. Throughout 2021, Hamilton toured the world via PORTL hologram, first in Europe and then making its U.S. debut in Los Angeles in September.

In September 2020, Hamilton launched Team X44 to compete in the all-electric SUV off-road racing series Extreme E from the 2021 season on. The X44 team finished 2nd in the inaugural Extreme E championship, behind Nico Rosberg's RXR team. In January 2022, X44 were crowned inaugural winners of Extreme E Sustainability Award. The team won the 2022 Championship in the final race of the season, beating RXR, who were disqualified from the race.

In August 2022, Hamilton joined the ownership group of the National Football League's Denver Broncos.

In 2023, Hamilton co-founded Almave, a non-alcoholic blue agave spirit brand. Pernod Ricard acquired a minority stake to support global distribution.

== Personal life ==
In 2017, Hamilton told the BBC that he had become vegan because "[a]s the human race, what we are doing to the world ... the pollution [in terms of emissions of global-warming gases] coming from the amount of cows that are being produced is incredible. The cruelty is horrible and I don't necessarily want to support that and I want to live a healthier life." In 2018, he was named the PETA Person of the Year for his vegan activism. The same year, Hamilton said in an interview that he gave up drinking "a while ago".

Hamilton used the number 44 in karts, as his father's Vauxhall Cavalier had the number plate "F44" when he started racing; it was his father's idea to use it. New Formula One driver number regulations brought in for the 2014 season allowed drivers to pick a unique car number to use for the remainder of their careers, with Hamilton electing to compete under his old karting number 44. Before the start of the 2015 season, Hamilton announced he would not be exercising his option of switching his car number to 1, as was his prerogative as reigning World Champion, and would instead continue to race with his career No. 44. It was the first season since 1994, when Alain Prost retired from the sport following his fourth and final World Drivers' Championship title in 1993, that the field did not contain a car bearing the No. 1.

Hamilton is a fan of art and has said that one of his favourite artists is Andy Warhol. Prior to the 2014 United States Grand Prix, Hamilton wore a gold-framed version of Warhol's Cars, Mercedes-Benz 300 SL Coupe painting hanging from a chain around his neck.

Hamilton is a Catholic; he says that he prays regularly and is guided by his faith. Hamilton believes that he has the "hand of God" resting over him when racing in Formula One. Hamilton revealed in March 2022 that he was in the process of legally changing his name to include his mother's maiden name, Larbalestier, as a middle name. Hamilton was made an honorary citizen of Brazil on 9 June 2022 after a proposal made by politician André Figueiredo was passed in the Brazilian Chamber of Deputies.

In an interview in September 2024, Hamilton stated he has been battling depression from the age of 13, linking the symptoms to the pressure of racing, difficulties at school and being bullied. Hamilton described having "some difficult phases" in his twenties.

On 29 September 2025, Hamilton revealed that his dog, Roscoe, had died the previous day, following complications from pneumonia. He adopted Roscoe in 2013. His second bulldog, Coco, died in 2020 at the age of six.

On 6 March 2026, Hamilton revealed that he adopted two cows Max and Hombre.

=== Relationships ===
From November 2007 to February 2015, Hamilton was in an on-and-off relationship with Nicole Scherzinger, the lead singer of the American girl group Pussycat Dolls. From 2023 to 2024, Hamilton was in a relationship with Brazilian model Juliana Nalu. In 2025, he was involved with Russian socialite Violetta Bert. Since 2026, he has been in a relationship with American media personality and socialite Kim Kardashian, first appearing together at Super Bowl LX.

=== Legal issues ===
Hamilton was suspended from driving in France for a month on 18 December 2007 after being caught speeding at 196 km/h (122 mph) on a French motorway. His Mercedes-Benz CLK was also impounded. Two days before the 2010 Australian Grand Prix, Victoria Police witnessed Hamilton "deliberately losing traction" in his silver Mercedes-AMG C63, and impounded the car for 48 hours. Hamilton immediately released a statement of apology for "driving in an over-exuberant manner". After being charged with intentionally losing control of a vehicle, Hamilton was eventually fined A$500 (£288), being described as a "hoon" by the magistrate.

In 2017, Hamilton's rights management company 44IP opposed Swatch Group's application to register a trade mark for "HAMILTON INTERNATIONAL" in Europe for the sale of watches and timepieces. 44IP alleged that Swatch Group's application was made in bad faith and that it was contrary to "fair competition" in relation to 44IP's existing "LEWIS HAMILTON" mark. In 2020 the case was heard before the European Union Intellectual Property Office (EUIPO). The EUIPO rejected 44IP's arguments, ruling that there had been no bad faith by Swatch Group (with "HAMILTON INTERNATIONAL" having been used on relevant goods since 1892) and that 44IP's "LEWIS HAMILTON" trade mark did not extend to the word "HAMILTON" alone for the purposes of protecting the existing mark.

=== Residence ===
Hamilton moved to Luins, Vaud, Switzerland, in 2007, citing privacy as his main reason for leaving the UK. He later said on the television show Parkinson that taxation was also a factor in his decision. In 2010, Hamilton, like many other Formula One drivers, moved to Monaco, purchasing a house worth a reported £10 million. Hamilton also owns an apartment in Manhattan, which he bought for US$40 million, and an estate in Colorado where he has said he would live after his retirement.

=== Wealth and income ===
In 2015, Hamilton was ranked as the richest British sportsperson, with an estimated personal fortune of £88 million. In 2018 it was reported that Hamilton had a net worth of £159 million. In 2020 Hamilton's fortune was an estimated £224 million, making him the richest British sports star in the history of the Sunday Times Rich List. By 2026 that figure had increased to £435 million.

Ahead of the 2015 Monaco Grand Prix weekend, Hamilton signed a contract to stay with Mercedes until the end of the 2018 season in a deal reportedly worth more than £100 million over the three years, making him one of the best-paid drivers in Formula One. In the week leading up to the 2018 German Grand Prix, Hamilton signed a two-year contract with Mercedes, reported to be worth up to £40 million per year, making him the best-paid driver in the history of Formula One. According to Forbes, Hamilton was one of the highest-paid athletes of the 2010s decade, and also the highest-paid Formula One driver from 2013 to 2021.

== Awards and honours ==
=== Formula One ===
- Formula One World Drivers' Championship: 2008, 2014, 2015, 2017, 2018, 2019, 2020
- DHL Fastest Lap Award: 2014, 2015, 2017, 2019, 2020
- FIA Pole Trophy: 2015, 2016, 2017, 2018 (Note: The FIA Pole Trophy was only awarded from 2014 to 2019. Hamilton also achieved the most pole positions in 2007 (tied with Felipe Massa), 2008, 2009 (tied with Jenson Button and Sebastian Vettel), 2012 and 2020.)
- Hawthorn Memorial Trophy: 2007, 2008, 2012, 2014, 2015, 2016, 2017, 2018, 2019, 2020, 2021, 2023
- Lorenzo Bandini Trophy: 2009
- FIA Action of the Year: 2022
- FIA Personality of the Year: 2014, 2018, 2020, 2021

=== Other awards ===
Throughout his two-decade career, Hamilton has received several awards and honours. He won the Laureus Breakthrough of the Year Award in 2008, and shared the Sportsman of the Year Award with Lionel Messi in 2020. Hamilton also won the BBC Sports Personality of the Year Award (2014, 2020), PAP European Sportsperson of the Year (2014, 2019), Best Driver ESPY Award (2017, 2021), L'Équipe Champion of Champions (2020), and Gazzetta World Sportsman of the Year (2018, 2020), among others. (Note: Per sources:) Hamilton has won a record 19 Autosport Awards, including eight International Racing Driver Awards. He was inducted into the FIA Hall of Fame in 2017, and shared the honorary FIA President Award in 2020 with Michael Schumacher.

=== Orders and special awards ===
- Brazil
  - Honorary Citizenship (2022)
- Grenada
  - Honorary Award (2008)
- United Kingdom
  - Member of the Order of the British Empire (2009)
  - Knight Bachelor (2021)

==== Fellowships ====
- Honorary Fellow, Royal Academy of Engineering (2019)

=== Recognition ===
- Lewis Hamilton by Dario Mitidieri, National Portrait Gallery, London (2007)
- Hamilton Straight, Silverstone Circuit (2020)
- Main belt asteroid 508440 Lewishamilton, by Mount Lemmon Survey (2025)
- Hamilton for Turn 2 of the Hungaroring (2026)

== Karting record ==
=== Karting career summary ===
Season	Series	Team	Position
1995	Super 1 National Championship – IAME Cadet		1st
1996	Kartmasters British Grand Prix – Comer Cadet		1st
1997	Super 1 National Championship – Formula Yamaha		1st
1998	Torneo delle Industrie – ICA-J		19th
1998	CIK-FIA Green Helmet Trophy – Cadet		12th
1998	Italian Open Masters– ICA-J		4th
1999	Torneo Industrie Open – ICA		1st
1999	South Garda Winter Cup – ICA-J		6th
1999	Andrea Margutti Trophy – ICA-J		18th
1999	Italian Open Masters – ICA-J		4th
1999	CIK-FIA European Championship – ICA-J		2nd
2000	Andrea Margutti Trophy – FA		7th
2000	CIK-FIA World Cup – FA	MBM.com	1st
2000	CIK-FIA European Championship – FA	MBM.com	1st
2000	CIK-FIA World Championship – FSA	MBM.com	20th
2001	South Garda Winter Cup – FSA		7th
2001	Italian Open Masters – FA	MBM.com	4th
2001	CIK-FIA World Championship – FSA	MBM.com	15th

== Racing record ==
=== Racing career summary ===
Season	Series	Team	Races	Wins	Poles	F/Laps	Podiums	Points	Position
2001	Formula Renault UK Winter Series	Manor Motorsport	4	0	0	0	0	48	7th
2002	Formula Renault 2.0 UK Championship	Manor Motorsport	13	3	3	5	7	274	**3rd**
2002	Formula Renault 2000 Eurocup	Manor Motorsport	4	1	1	2	3	92	5th
2003	Formula Renault 2.0 UK Championship	Manor Motorsport	15	10	11	9	13	419	**1st**
2003	British Formula 3 International Series	Manor Motorsport	2	0	0	0	0	0	NC
2003	Formula Renault 2000 Masters	Manor Motorsport	2	0	0	0	1	24	12th
2003	Formula Renault 2000 Germany	Manor Motorsport	2	0	0	0	0	25	27th
2003	Korea Super Prix	Manor Motorsport	1	0	1	0	0	—N/a	NC
2003	Macau Grand Prix	Manor Motorsport	1	0	0	0	0	—N/a	NC
2004	Formula 3 Euro Series	Manor Motorsport	20	1	1	2	5	69	5th
2004	Bahrain Superprix	Manor Motorsport	1	1	0	0	1	—N/a	**1st**
2004	Macau Grand Prix	Manor Motorsport	1	0	1	0	0	—N/a	14th
2004	Masters of Formula 3	Manor Motorsport	1	0	0	0	0	—N/a	7th
2005	Formula 3 Euro Series	ASM Formule 3	20	15	13	10	17	172	**1st**
2005	Masters of Formula 3	ASM Formule 3	1	1	1	1	1	—N/a	**1st**
2006	GP2 Series	ART Grand Prix	21	5	1	7	14	114	**1st**
2006	Formula One	Team McLaren Mercedes	Test driver						
2007	Formula One	Vodafone McLaren Mercedes	17	4	6	2	12	109	**2nd**
2008	Formula One	Vodafone McLaren Mercedes	18	5	7	1	10	98	**1st**
2009	Formula One	Vodafone McLaren Mercedes	17	2	4	0	5	49	5th
2010	Formula One	Vodafone McLaren Mercedes	19	3	1	5	9	240	4th
2011	Formula One	Vodafone McLaren Mercedes	19	3	1	3	6	227	5th
2012	Formula One	Vodafone McLaren Mercedes	20	4	7	1	7	190	4th
2013	Formula One	Mercedes-AMG Petronas F1 Team	19	1	5	1	5	189	4th
2014	Formula One	Mercedes-AMG Petronas F1 Team	19	11	7	7	16	384	**1st**
2015	Formula One	Mercedes-AMG Petronas F1 Team	19	10	11	8	17	381	**1st**
2016	Formula One	Mercedes-AMG Petronas F1 Team	21	10	12	3	17	380	**2nd**
2017	Formula One	Mercedes-AMG Petronas Motorsport	20	9	11	7	13	363	**1st**
2018	Formula One	Mercedes-AMG Petronas Motorsport	21	11	11	3	17	408	**1st**
2019	Formula One	Mercedes-AMG Petronas Motorsport	21	11	5	6	17	413	**1st**
2020	Formula One	Mercedes-AMG Petronas F1 Team	16	11	10	6	14	347	**1st**
2021	Formula One	Mercedes-AMG Petronas F1 Team	22	8	5	6	17	387.5	**2nd**
2022	Formula One	Mercedes-AMG Petronas F1 Team	22	0	0	2	9	240	6th
2023	Formula One	Mercedes-AMG Petronas F1 Team	22	0	1	4	6	234	**3rd**
2024	Formula One	Mercedes-AMG Petronas F1 Team	24	2	0	2	5	223	7th
2025	Formula One	Scuderia Ferrari HP	24	0	0	1	0	156	6th
2026	Formula One	Scuderia Ferrari HP	20	1	1	2	7	261*	4th*

* Season still in progress.

=== Complete Formula Renault 2.0 UK Championship results ===
(key) (Races in bold indicate pole position; races in italics indicate fastest lap)

Year	Entrant	1	2	3	4	5	6	7	8	9	10	11	12	13	14	15	16	17	DC	Points
2002	Manor Motorsport	BRH; 3	OUL; 15	THR; 2	SIL; 9	**THR**; 1	BRH; 20	CRO; 6	SNE; 2	SNE; Ret	KNO; 2	**BRH**; 1	**DON**; 1	DON; 4					3rd	274
2003	Manor Motorsport	**SNE**; **1**; 2	SNE; 2; 3	BRH; Ret	THR; 2	SIL; 1	**ROC**; 1	**CRO**; **1**; 1	**CRO**; **2**; 1	**DON**; **1** Ret	DON; 2; 1	**SNE**; 1	**BRH**; **1**; 1	**BRH**; **2**; 1	**DON**; **1**; 1	**DON**; **2**; 1	OUL; 1	OUL; 2	1st	419

=== Complete Macau Grand Prix results ===
Year	Team	Car	Qualifying	Quali Race	Main race	Ref
2003	(United Kingdom) Manor Motorsport	Dallara F303	18th	—N/a	DNF	
2004	(United Kingdom) Manor Motorsport	Dallara F304	**2nd**	**1st**	14th	

=== Complete Formula 3 Euro Series results ===
(key) (Races in bold indicate pole position; races in italics indicate fastest lap)

Year	Entrant	Chassis	Engine	1	2	3	4	5	6	7	8	9	10	11	12	13	14	15	16	17	18	19	20	DC	Points
2004	Manor Motorsport	Dallara F302/049	HWA-Mercedes	HOC; 1; 11	HOC; 2; 6	EST; 1 Ret	EST; 2; 9	ADR; 1 Ret	ADR; 2; 5	PAU; 1; 4	PAU; 2; 7	**NOR**; **1**; 1	NOR; 2; 3	MAG; 1 Ret	MAG; 2; 21	NÜR; 1; 3	NÜR; 2; 4	ZAN; 1; 3	ZAN; 2; 6	BRN; 1; 7	BRN; 2; 4	HOC; 1; 2	HOC; 2; 6	5th	68
2005	ASM Formule 3	Dallara F305/021	Mercedes	**HOC**; **1**; 1	HOC; 2; 3	**PAU**; **1**; 1	**PAU**; **2**; 1	**SPA**; **1** DSQ	SPA; 2; 1	**MON**; **1**; 1	**MON**; **2**; 1	OSC; 1; 3	**OSC**; **2**; 1	**NOR**; **1**; 1	**NOR**; **2**; 1	NÜR; 1; 12	NÜR; 2; 1	**ZAN**; **1** Ret	**ZAN**; **2**; 1	LAU; 1; 1	LAU; 2; 1	**HOC**; **1**; 1	**HOC**; **2**; 1	1st	172

=== Complete GP2 Series results ===
(key) (Races in bold indicate pole position; races in italics indicate fastest lap)

Year	Entrant	1	2	3	4	5	6	7	8	9	10	11	12	13	14	15	16	17	18	19	20	21	DC	Points
2006	ART Grand Prix	VAL; FEA; 2	VAL; SPR; 6	IMO; FEA; DSQ	IMO; SPR; 10	NÜR; FEA; 1	NÜR; SPR; 1	CAT; FEA; 2	CAT; SPR; 4	**MON**; **FEA**; 1	SIL; FEA; 1	SIL; SPR; 1	MAG; FEA; 19	MAG; SPR; 5	HOC; FEA; 2	HOC; SPR; 3	HUN; FEA; 10	HUN; SPR; 2	IST; FEA; 2	IST; SPR; 2	MNZ; FEA; 3	MNZ; SPR; 2	1st	114

=== Complete Formula One results ===
(key) (Races in bold indicate pole position; races in italics indicate fastest lap; ^{superscript} indicates point-scoring sprint position)

Year	Entrant	Chassis	Engine	1	2	3	4	5	6	7	8	9	10	11	12	13	14	15	16	17	18	19	20	21	22	23	24	WDC	Points
2007	Vodafone McLaren Mercedes	McLaren MP4-22	Mercedes-Benz FO 108T 2.4 V8	AUS; 3	MAL; 2	BHR; 2	ESP; 2	MON; 2	**CAN**; 1	**USA**; 1	FRA; 3	**GBR**; 3	EUR; 9	**HUN**; 1	TUR; 5	ITA; 2	BEL; 4	**JPN**; 1	**CHN**; Ret	BRA; 7								2nd	109
2008	Vodafone McLaren Mercedes	McLaren MP4-23	Mercedes-Benz FO 108V 2.4 V8	**AUS**; 1	MAL; 5	BHR; 13	ESP; 3	TUR; 2	MON; 1	**CAN**; Ret	FRA; 10	GBR; 1	**GER**; 1	**HUN**; 5	EUR; 2	**BEL**; 3	ITA; 7	SIN; 3	**JPN**; 12	**CHN**; 1	BRA; 5							1st	98
2009	Vodafone McLaren Mercedes	McLaren MP4-24	Mercedes-Benz FO 108W 2.4 V8	AUS; DSQ	MAL; 7^{‡}	CHN; 6	BHR; 4	ESP; 9	MON; 12	TUR; 13	GBR; 16	GER; 18	HUN; 1	**EUR**; 2	BEL; Ret	**ITA**; 12^{†}	**SIN**; 1	JPN; 3	BRA; 3	**ABU**; Ret								5th	49
2010	Vodafone McLaren Mercedes	McLaren MP4-25	Mercedes-Benz FO 108X 2.4 V8	BHR; 3	AUS; 6	MAL; 6	CHN; 2	ESP; 14^{†}	MON; 5	TUR; 1	**CAN**; 1	EUR; 2	GBR; 2	GER; 4	HUN; Ret	BEL; 1	ITA; Ret	SIN; Ret	JPN; 5	KOR; 2	BRA; 4	ABU; 2						4th	240
2011	Vodafone McLaren Mercedes	McLaren MP4-26	Mercedes-Benz FO 108Y 2.4 V8	AUS; 2	MAL; 8	CHN; 1	TUR; 4	ESP; 2	MON; 6	CAN; Ret	EUR; 4	GBR; 4	GER; 1	HUN; 4	BEL; Ret	ITA; 4	SIN; 5	JPN; 5	**KOR**; 2	IND; 7	ABU; 1	BRA; Ret						5th	227
2012	Vodafone McLaren Mercedes	McLaren MP4-27	Mercedes-Benz FO 108Z 2.4 V8	**AUS**; 3	**MAL**; 3	CHN; 3	BHR; 8	ESP; 8	MON; 5	CAN; 1	EUR; 19^{†}	GBR; 8	GER; Ret	**HUN**; 1	BEL; Ret	**ITA**; 1	**SIN**; Ret	JPN; 5	KOR; 10	IND; 4	**ABU**; Ret	USA; 1	**BRA**; Ret					4th	190
2013	Mercedes-AMG Petronas F1 Team	Mercedes F1 W04	Mercedes-Benz FO 108F 2.4 V8	AUS; 5	MAL; 3	**CHN**; 3	BHR; 5	ESP; 12	MON; 4	CAN; 3	**GBR**; 4	**GER**; 5	**HUN**; 1	**BEL**; 3	ITA; 9	SIN; 5	KOR; 5	JPN; Ret	IND; 6	ABU; 7	USA; 4	BRA; 9						4th	189
2014	Mercedes-AMG Petronas F1 Team	Mercedes F1 W05 Hybrid	Mercedes-Benz PU106A Hybrid 1.6 V6 t	**AUS**; Ret	**MAL**; 1	BHR; 1	**CHN**; 1	**ESP**; 1	MON; 2	CAN; Ret	AUT; 2	GBR; 1	GER; 3	HUN; 3	BEL; Ret	**ITA**; 1	**SIN**; 1	JPN; 1	**RUS**; 1	USA; 1	BRA; 2	ABU; 1						1st	384
2015	Mercedes-AMG Petronas F1 Team	Mercedes F1 W06 Hybrid	Mercedes-Benz PU106B Hybrid 1.6 V6 t	**AUS**; 1	**MAL**; 2	**CHN**; 1	**BHR**; 1	ESP; 2	**MON**; 3	**CAN**; 1	**AUT**; 2	**GBR**; 1	**HUN**; 6	**BEL**; 1	**ITA**; 1	SIN; Ret	JPN; 1	RUS; 1	USA; 1	MEX; 2	BRA; 2	ABU; 2						1st	381
2016	Mercedes-AMG Petronas F1 Team	Mercedes F1 W07 Hybrid	Mercedes-Benz PU106C Hybrid 1.6 V6 t	**AUS**; 2	**BHR**; 3	CHN; 7	RUS; 2	**ESP**; Ret	MON; 1	**CAN**; 1	EUR; 5	**AUT**; 1	**GBR**; 1	HUN; 1	GER; 1	BEL; 3	**ITA**; 2	SIN; 3	**MAL**; Ret	JPN; 3	**USA**; 1	**MEX**; 1	**BRA**; 1	**ABU**; 1				2nd	380
2017	Mercedes-AMG Petronas Motorsport	Mercedes-AMG F1 W08	Mercedes-AMG M08 EQ Power+ 1.6 V6 t	**AUS**; 2	**CHN**; 1	BHR; 2	RUS; 4	**ESP**; 1	MON; 7	**CAN**; 1	**AZE**; 5	AUT; 4	**GBR**; 1	HUN; 4	**BEL**; 1	**ITA**; 1	SIN; 1	**MAL**; 2	**JPN**; 1	**USA**; 1	MEX; 9	BRA; 4	ABU; 2					1st	363
2018	Mercedes-AMG Petronas Motorsport	Mercedes-AMG F1 W09	Mercedes-AMG M09 EQ Power+ 1.6 V6 t	**AUS**; 2	BHR; 3	CHN; 4	AZE; 1	**ESP**; 1	MON; 3	CAN; 5	**FRA**; 1	AUT; Ret	**GBR**; 2	GER; 1	**HUN**; 1	**BEL**; 2	ITA; 1	**SIN**; 1	RUS; 1	**JPN**; 1	**USA**; 3	MEX; 4	**BRA**; 1	**ABU**; 1				1st	408
2019	Mercedes-AMG Petronas Motorsport	Mercedes-AMG F1 W10	Mercedes-AMG M10 EQ Power+ 1.6 V6 t	**AUS**; 2	BHR; 1	CHN; 1	AZE; 2	ESP; 1	**MON**; 1	CAN; 1	**FRA**; 1	AUT; 5	GBR; 1	**GER**; 9	HUN; 1	BEL; 2	ITA; 3	SIN; 4	RUS; 1	JPN; 3	MEX; 1	USA; 2	BRA; 7	**ABU**; 1				**1st**	**413**
2020	Mercedes-AMG Petronas F1 Team	Mercedes-AMG F1 W11	Mercedes-AMG M11 EQ Performance 1.6 V6 t	AUT; 4	**STY**; 1	**HUN**; 1	**GBR**; 1	70A; 2	**ESP**; 1	**BEL**; 1	**ITA**; 7	**TUS**; 1	**RUS**; 3	EIF; 1	**POR**; 1	EMI; 1	TUR; 1	**BHR**; 1	SKH	ABU; 3								1st	347
2021	Mercedes-AMG Petronas F1 Team	Mercedes-AMG F1 W12	Mercedes-AMG M12 E Performance 1.6 V6 t	BHR; 1	**EMI**; 2	POR; 1	**ESP**; 1	MON; 7	AZE; 15	FRA; 2	STY; 2	AUT; 4	GBR; 1^{2}	**HUN**; 2	BEL; 3‡	NED; 2	ITA; Ret	RUS; 1	TUR; 5	USA; 2	MXC; 2	SAP; 1	**QAT**; 1	**SAU**; 1	ABU; 2			2nd	387.5
2022	Mercedes-AMG Petronas F1 Team	Mercedes-AMG F1 W13	Mercedes-AMG M13 E Performance 1.6 V6 t	BHR; 3	SAU; 10	AUS; 4	EMI; 13	MIA; 6	ESP; 5	MON; 8	AZE; 4	CAN; 3	GBR; 3	AUT; 3^{8}	FRA; 2	HUN; 2	BEL; Ret	NED; 4	ITA; 5	SIN; 9	JPN; 5	USA; 2	MXC; 2	SAP; 2^{3}	ABU; 18†			6th	240
2023	Mercedes-AMG Petronas F1 Team	Mercedes-AMG F1 W14	Mercedes-AMG M14 E Performance 1.6 V6 t	BHR; 5	SAU; 5	AUS; 2	AZE; 6^{7}	MIA; 6	MON; 4	ESP; 2	CAN; 3	AUT; 8	GBR; 3	**HUN**; 4	BEL; 4^{7}	NED; 6	ITA; 6	SIN; 3	JPN; 5	QAT; Ret^{5}	USA; DSQ^{2}	MXC; 2	SAP; 8^{7}	LVG; 7	ABU; 9			3rd	234
2024	Mercedes-AMG Petronas F1 Team	Mercedes-AMG F1 W15	Mercedes-AMG M15 E Performance 1.6 V6 t	BHR; 7	SAU; 9	AUS; Ret	JPN; 9	CHN; 9^{2}	MIA; 6	EMI; 6	MON; 7	CAN; 4	ESP; 3	AUT; 4^{6}	GBR; 1	HUN; 3	BEL; 1	NED; 8	ITA; 5	AZE; 9	SIN; 6	USA; Ret^{6}	MXC; 4	SAP; 10	LVG; 2	QAT; 12^{6}	ABU; 4	7th	223
2025	Scuderia Ferrari HP	Ferrari SF-25	Ferrari 066/15 1.6 V6 t	AUS; 10	CHN; DSQ^{1}	JPN; 7	BHR; 5	SAU; 7	MIA; 8^{3}	EMI; 4	MON; 5	ESP; 6	CAN; 6	AUT; 4	GBR; 4	BEL; 7	HUN; 12	NED; Ret	ITA; 6	AZE; 8	SIN; 8	USA; 4^{4}	MXC; 8	SAP; Ret^{7}	LVG; 8	QAT; 12	ABU; 8	6th	156
2026	Scuderia Ferrari HP	Ferrari SF-26	Ferrari 067/6 1.6 V6 t	AUS; 4	CHN; 3^{3}	JPN; 6	MIA; 6^{7}	CAN; 2^{6}	MON; 2	BCN; 1	AUT; 5	GBR; 3^{2}	BEL; 4	HUN; 5	NED; 4^{7}	ITA; 6	ESP; Ret	AZE; 6	BHR; 3	SIN; 6^{2}	USA; 4	**MXC**; 2	SAP; 9	LVG	QAT	ABU		4th*	261*

^{†} Did not finish, but was classified as he had completed more than 90% of the race distance.
^{‡} Half points awarded as less than 75% of race distance was completed.
* Season still in progress.

==== Formula One records ====
Hamilton debuted at the 2007 Australian Grand Prix, becoming the first black driver to compete in Formula One. (Note: Hamilton is the first black driver to compete in the Formula One World Championship, and the second to drive a Formula One car after Willy T. Ribbs.) He holds over 90 records in Formula One, including the most race wins (106), pole positions (105), podium finishes (209), and championship points (5,279.5). With his victory at the 2008 World Drivers' Championship, Hamilton became the then-youngest driver to win the title, aged 23 years and 301 days. Hamilton won his seventh title in 2020, tying the all-time record set by Michael Schumacher.

== Notes ==
Sporting positions
Preceded by Danny Watts	Formula Renault UK; Champion; 2003	Succeeded by Mike Conway
Preceded by Jamie Green	Formula 3 Euro Series; Drivers' Champion; 2005	Succeeded by Paul di Resta
Preceded by Nick Heidfeld (1997)	Monaco Formula Three Support; Race Winner; 2005	Succeeded by None (race not held since)
Preceded by Alexandre Prémat	Formula Three Masters; Winner; 2005	Succeeded by Paul di Resta
Preceded by Nico Rosberg	GP2 Series; Drivers' Champion; 2006	Succeeded by Timo Glock
Preceded by Kimi Räikkönen	Formula One World Champion; 2008	Succeeded by Jenson Button
Preceded by Sebastian Vettel	Formula One World Champion; 2014–2015	Succeeded by Nico Rosberg
Preceded by Nico Rosberg	Formula One World Champion; 2017–2020	Succeeded by Max Verstappen
Awards and achievements
Preceded by Danny Watts	Autosport Awards; British Club Driver of the Year; 2003	Succeeded by James Pickford
Preceded by Tiago Monteiro	Autosport Awards; Rookie of the Year; 2006–2007	Succeeded by Sebastian Vettel
Preceded by Jenson Button	Hawthorn Memorial Trophy; 2007–2008	Succeeded by Jenson Button
Preceded by Stirling Moss	Segrave Trophy; 2007	Succeeded by Allan McNish
Preceded by Jenson Button	Autosport Awards; British Competition Driver of the Year; 2007	Succeeded by Allan McNish
Preceded by Fernando Alonso	Autosport Awards; International Racing Driver Award; 2007–2008	Succeeded by Jenson Button
Preceded by Amélie Mauresmo	Laureus World Breakthrough of the Year; 2008	Succeeded by Rebecca Adlington
Preceded by Sebastian Vettel	Lorenzo Bandini Trophy; 2010	Succeeded by Nico Rosberg
Preceded by Jenson Button	Hawthorn Memorial Trophy; 2012	Succeeded by Mark Webber
Preceded by Jenson Button	Autosport Awards; British Competition Driver of the Year; 2013–2018	Succeeded by Lando Norris
Preceded by Mark Webber	Hawthorn Memorial Trophy; 2014–2021	Succeeded by George Russell
Preceded by Sebastian Vettel	DHL Fastest Lap Award; 2014–2015	Succeeded by Nico Rosberg
Preceded by Sebastian Vettel	Autosport Awards; International Racing Driver Award; 2014–2015	Succeeded by Nico Rosberg
Preceded by Andy Murray	BBC Sports Personality of the Year; 2014	Succeeded by Andy Murray
Preceded by Robert Kubica	FIA Personality of the Year; 2014	Succeeded by Max Verstappen
Preceded by Nico Rosberg	FIA Pole Trophy; 2015–2018	Succeeded by Charles Leclerc
Preceded by Nico Rosberg	DHL Fastest Lap Award; 2017	Succeeded by Valtteri Bottas
Preceded by Kyle Busch	Best Driver ESPY Award; 2017	Succeeded by Martin Truex Jr.
Preceded by Nico Rosberg	Autosport Awards; International Racing Driver Award; 2017–2020	Succeeded by Max Verstappen
Preceded by Max Verstappen	FIA Personality of the Year; 2018	Succeeded by Niki Lauda
Preceded by Valtteri Bottas	DHL Fastest Lap Award; 2019–2021	Succeeded by Incumbent
Preceded by Ben Stokes	BBC Sports Personality of the Year; 2020	Succeeded by Emma Raducanu
Preceded by Niki Lauda	FIA Personality of the Year; 2020–2021	Succeeded by Incumbent
Preceded by Rafael Nadal	L'Équipe Champion of Champions; 2020	Succeeded by Novak Djokovic
Preceded by George Russell	Hawthorn Memorial Trophy; 2023	Succeeded by Lando Norris
Records
Preceded by Michael Schumacher; 91 wins (1991–2006, 2010–2012)	Most Grand Prix wins 106 wins 92nd at the 2020 Portuguese Grand Prix	Succeeded by Incumbent
Preceded by Juan Manuel Fangio and Giuseppe Farina; 3 wins (1950 season)	Most wins in first Formula One season 4 wins 2007, tied with: Jacques Villeneuve (1996)	Succeeded by Co-Incumbent
Preceded by Bruce McLaren; 23 years, 5 days (1960 season)	Youngest Formula One; World Drivers' Championship runner-up 22 years, 287 days (2007 season)	Succeeded by Sebastian Vettel; 22 years, 121 days (2009 season)
Preceded by Fernando Alonso; 24 years, 58 days (2005 season)	Youngest Formula One; World Drivers' Champion; 23 years, 300 days (2008 season)	Succeeded by Sebastian Vettel; 23 years, 134 days (2010 season)
Preceded by Kimi Räikkönen; 262.242 km/h (162.950 mph) (2018 Italian GP)	Fastest Grand Prix qualifying lap 264.362 km/h (164.267 mph) (2020 Italian Grand Prix)	Succeeded by Max Verstappen; 264.681 km/h (164.465 mph) (2025 Italian GP)
