= Hengkie Iriawan =

Indonesian racing driver (1945-1972)

- Nationality: (Indonesia) Indonesian
- Full name: Hengkie Oei Iriawan
- Born: 28 April 1945 Palembang, Indonesia
- Died: 23 April 1972 (aged 26) Ipoh, Perak, Malaysia
- Retired: 1972

Formula Libre
- Years active: 1967-1972
- Teams: Elfin
- Starts: 15
- Wins: 2
- Poles: 0
- Fastest laps: 0

Previous series
- New Zealand Gold Star Championship, Macau GT & Sports Car Race

Awards
- 1968: Malaysian Grand Prix winner

Hengkie Oei Iriawan was an Indonesian racing car driver who raced from 1967 to 1972 in various races in Asia. He famously won the 1968 Malaysian Grand Prix in Shah Alam driving a Ford-powered Elfin 600.
