= 2015 Malaysian Grand Prix =

Race 2 of 19 in the 2015 Formula One World Championship
← Previous race	Next race →

Race details
- Date: 29 March 2015
- Official name: 2015 Formula 1 Petronas Malaysia Grand Prix
- Location: Sepang International Circuit, Sepang, Kuala Lumpur, Malaysia
- Course: Permanent racing facility
- Course length: 5.543 km (3.444 mi)
- Distance: 56 laps, 310.408 km (192.879 mi)
- Weather: Sunny; 32–33 °C (90–91 °F) air temperature 53–58 °C (127–136 °F) track temperature 2 m/s (6.6 ft/s) wind from the south
- Attendance: 80,604 (Weekend); 44,611 (Race Day)

Pole position
Driver	(United Kingdom) Lewis Hamilton	Mercedes
- Time: 1:49.834

Fastest lap
Driver	(Germany) Nico Rosberg	Mercedes
- Time: 1:42.062 on lap 43

Podium
First	(Germany) Sebastian Vettel	Ferrari
Second	(United Kingdom) Lewis Hamilton	Mercedes
Third	(Germany) Nico Rosberg	Mercedes

The 2015 Malaysian Grand Prix, formally titled the 2015 Formula 1 Petronas Malaysia Grand Prix, was a Formula One motor race that was held on 29 March 2015 at the Sepang International Circuit in Kuala Lumpur, Malaysia. It was the seventeenth running of the Malaysian Grand Prix as a World Championship event.

Lewis Hamilton came into the race leading the Drivers' championship by seven points over teammate Nico Rosberg, followed closely by Sebastian Vettel, a further three points adrift. Mercedes entered with a twenty-eight-point lead over Ferrari in the Constructors' championship campaign.

Hamilton secured pole position in a rain-soaked qualifying session, the 40th pole position in his career. Vettel won the race, having started from second place on the grid. It was the 40th victory of his career, and the first victory for Ferrari since the 2013 Spanish Grand Prix as well as the first victory for a German Ferrari driver since the 2006 Chinese Grand Prix won by Michael Schumacher. It was also the first time since the 2006 United States Grand Prix that neither McLaren was classified.

== Background ==
The race, held on 29 March 2015 with practice and qualifying sessions on the two preceding days, was the seventeenth running of the Malaysian Grand Prix, which had been part of the Formula One World Championship without interruption since 1999. A race sanctioned by the Fédération Internationale de l'Automobile, motorsport's governing body, had been held in Malaysia since the 1960s, with the first editions being run in Singapore, then part of the Malaysian Federation, before moving to the Shah Alam Circuit. With the arrival of the Formula One Grand Prix in 1999, the race was moved to the purpose-built Sepang International Circuit, where all editions have since been held. For sponsorship reasons, the race's official name was 2015 Formula 1 Petronas Malaysia Grand Prix.

Going into the weekend, Lewis Hamilton was leading the Drivers' Championship, having won the first race ahead of his teammate Nico Rosberg and Sebastian Vettel. He therefore had 25 points and held a seven-point advantage over Rosberg, with Vettel another three points behind. In the constructors' standings, Mercedes was on top, having taken the maximum available 43 points from their 1–2 finish in Melbourne. Ferrari were second on 15 points, followed by Sauber with 14.

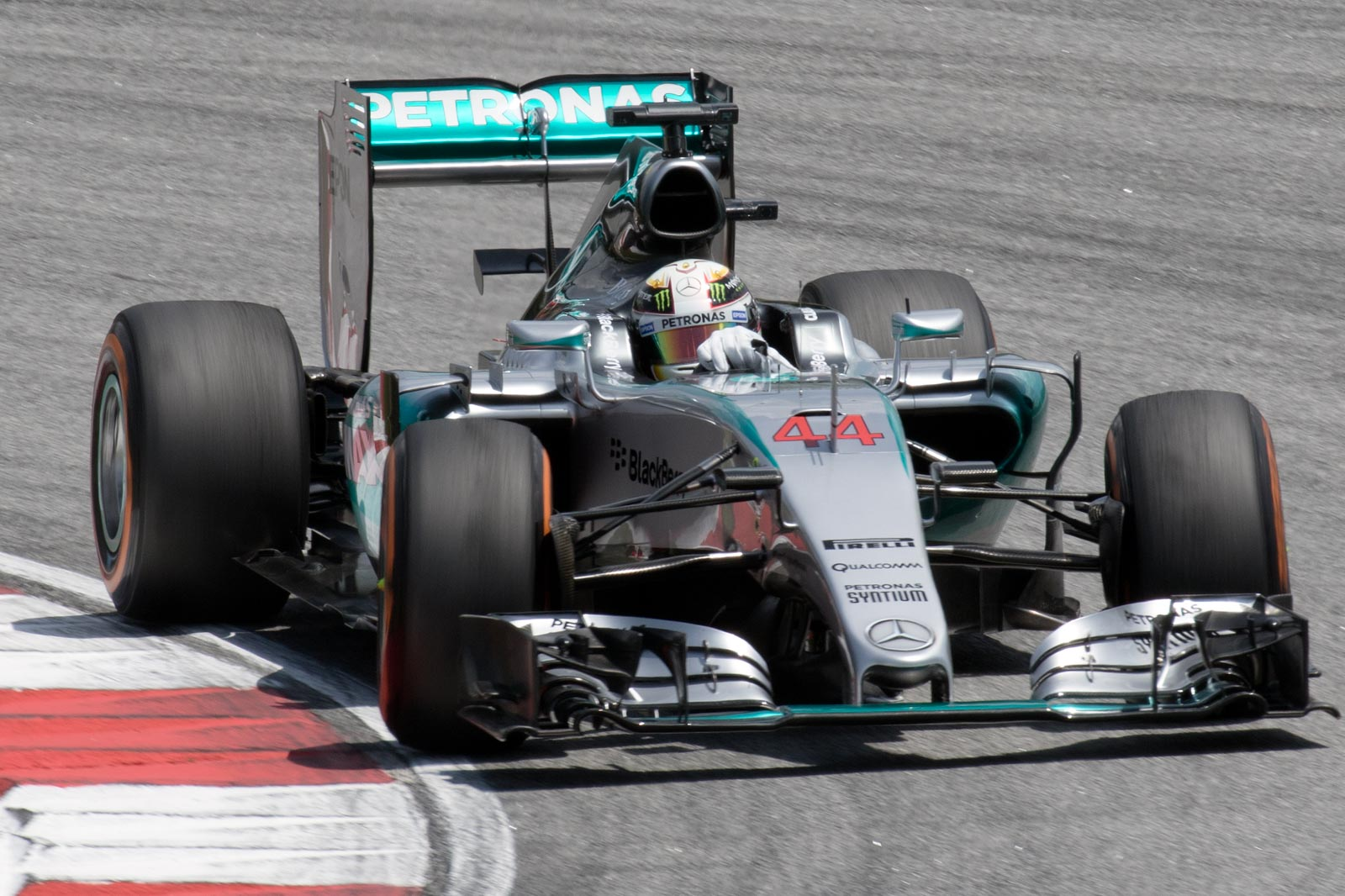
The dominance of Mercedes and Lewis Hamilton (pictured during practice) was a major talking point before the race.

Mercedes arrived at the second race of the season with maximum points from Australia, having finished first and second with third placed Sebastian Vettel half a minute down. Following their dominant performance, many commentators voiced fears that the sport might become even more one-sided and boring over the course of the 2015 season than it had been the previous year. Red Bull's team principal Christian Horner called for the FIA to step in and apply rule changes that would level the competition, stating: "The FIA, within the rules, have an equalisation mechanism and that needs to be looked at." Red Bull subsequently threatened to leave the sport, should no measures be taken. While many commentators pointed out that Red Bull had enjoyed their own share of dominance in the prior years, Formula One supremo Bernie Ecclestone voiced understanding for the team, saying: "There is a rule that I think [former president] Max [Mosley] put in when he was there that in the event... that a particular team or engine supplier did something magic - which Mercedes have done - the FIA can level up things. They [Mercedes] have done a first class job which everybody acknowledges. We need to change things a little bit now and try to level things up a little bit." Mercedes' executive director Toto Wolff reacted to the calls by urging his rivals to "get your fucking head down and work to sort it out". McLaren driver Jenson Button also raised doubt over the practicality of rule changes, saying "There's nothing really to ban because it doesn't look like Mercedes are doing anything other teams aren't doing."

"All you bloody crowd have been complaining about everything, so let's hear it. If you were in my position, apart from leaving, what would you do?"

— Bernie Ecclestone, speaking about Formula One's problems with journalists in Malaysia.

Following criticism voiced by Red Bull, the future of engine supplier Renault was also a matter of debate. While Renault contemplated exiting the sport, another scenario that received media attention was a possible buy-out of the Toro Rosso team. The discussion about the future of the sport was additionally fuelled by the news that the German Grand Prix would be dropped from the 2015 calendar, due to a lack of financing. The exclusion of one of motorsport's most traditional events caused many to raise the question whether the same fate might await other traditional venues such as Monza.

Fernando Alonso returned from his pre-season injury to take back his seat at McLaren, which had been filled by Kevin Magnussen at the previous race in Australia. Also returning was Williams driver Valtteri Bottas, who missed the previous race due to a back injury sustained during qualifying.

Manor Marussia, who were able to field their cars for the first time in Malaysia, were under criticism after they failed to run their cars at the Australian Grand Prix, with Ecclestone saying they would need to pay for their travel expenses, which are usually covered by the commercial rights holder.

As in the previous two years, Pirelli announced they would be supplying teams with the orange-banded hard compound tyre as the prime selection and the white-banded medium compound as the option selection for the event. The event also made use of Pirelli's two wet weather tyres, the green-banded intermediate and blue-banded full wet tyres.

== Practice ==
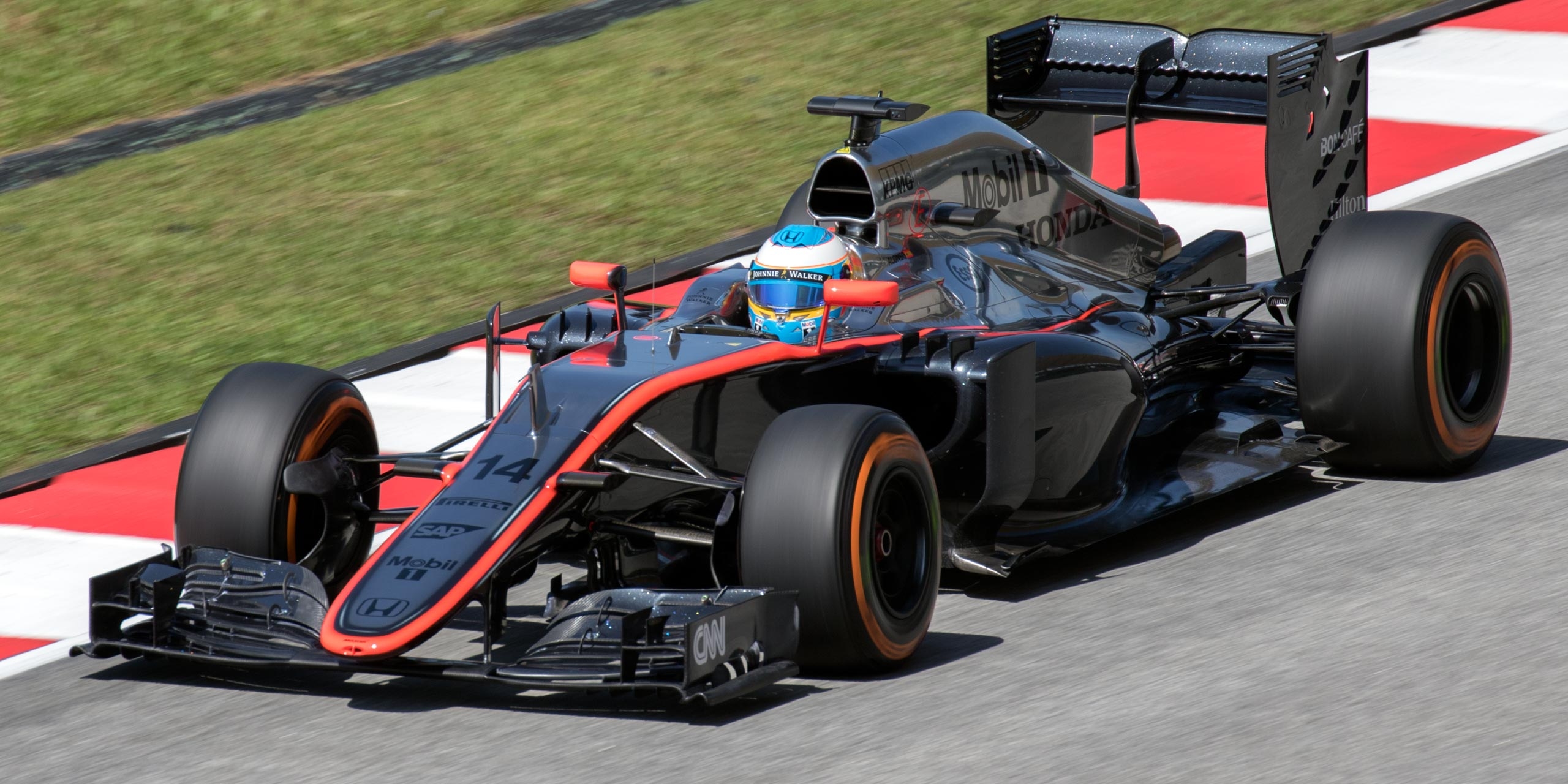
Fernando Alonso returned to the grid after missing the first race in Australia.

Per the regulations for the 2015 season, three practice sessions were held, two 90-minute sessions on Friday and another one-hour session before qualifying on Saturday. Nico Rosberg set the fastest time in the first practice session on Friday morning, while championship leader Lewis Hamilton was sidelined due to engine problems. He recovered to take fastest time in the second session of the day, while Ferrari proved that they would be closer to their rivals in Sepang, coming within 0.4 seconds in both free practice sessions.

Fernando Alonso made his debut in the new McLaren, finishing 14th and 16th in the two Friday sessions respectively, outpacing teammate Jenson Button both times. Also debuting during free practice were Manor-Marussia, with both cars struggling to meet the time limit of 107%. Raffaele Marciello filled in for Sauber-regular Felipe Nasr during the first session.

During the third practice session on Saturday morning, both Mercedes drivers were once again fastest, with Rosberg setting the fastest time, while Ferrari was about half a second behind.

== Qualifying ==
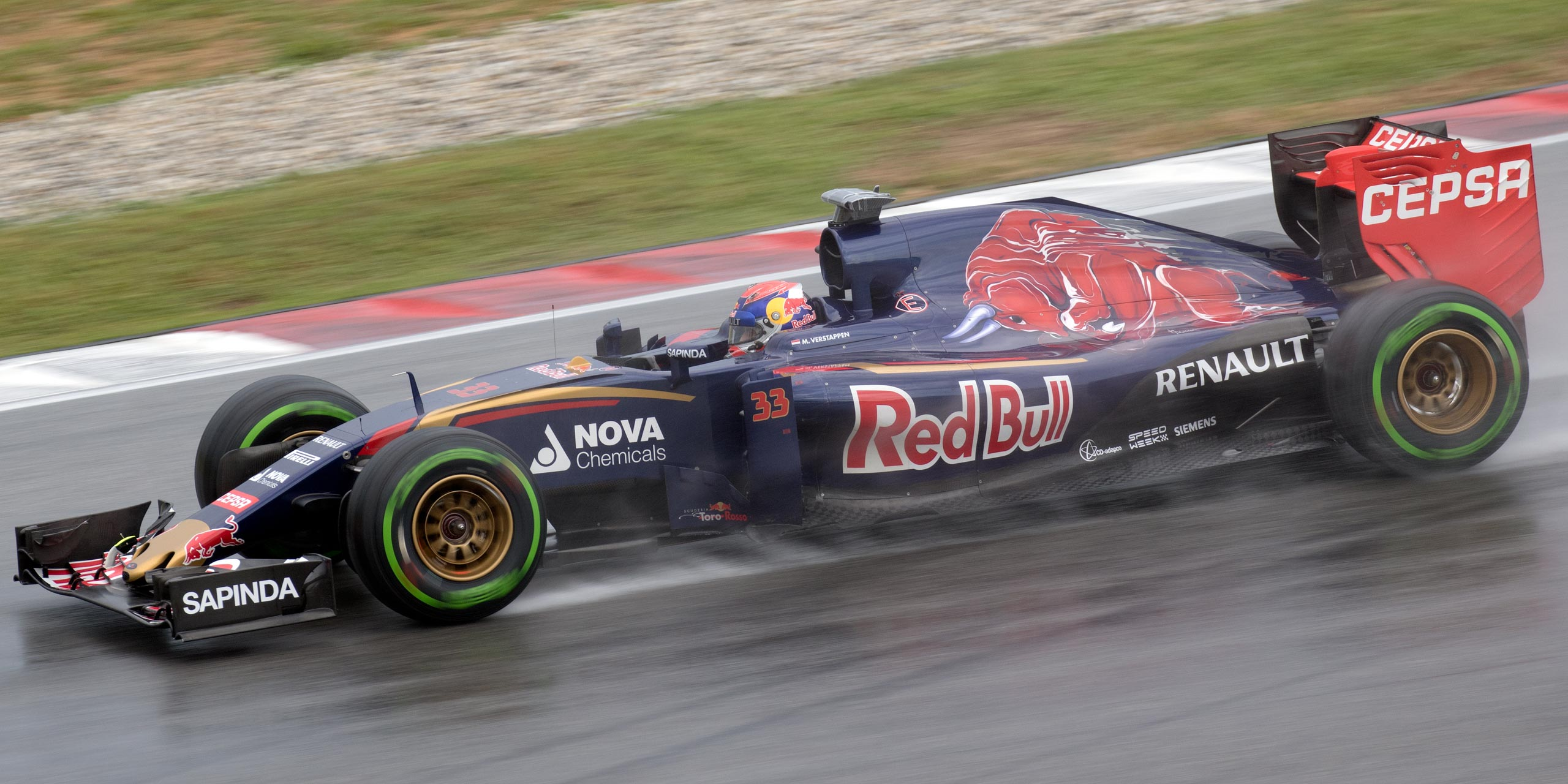
Max Verstappen, pictured here during the wet qualifying session, became the youngest driver to score points in Formula One.

Qualifying consisted of three parts, 18, 15 and 12 minutes in length respectively, with five drivers eliminated from competing after each of the first two sessions. The first part of qualifying (Q1) got under way in the dry and sunny conditions; this was not the conditions that would favour McLaren as they were still off the pace of the midfield although they made progress. Jenson Button along with his returning teammate Fernando Alonso were separated by only a tenth of a second, but were 17th and 18th on the grid. Joining them were the Manor-Marussia cars of Roberto Merhi and Will Stevens; Merhi recorded a time that was almost five seconds slower than Alonso, and Stevens failed to take to the circuit, while Felipe Nasr also failed to make it out of Q1, as he struggled for balance in his Sauber.

Clouds built up at the west of the circuit before Q2 and there was a traffic jam in the pit lane. A scramble for position started to be evident and only one driver – Nico Rosberg – managed a clean lap without traffic, as the rest of the field dealt with the thunderstorm that was warned to arrive during Q2 and started tripping up on each other. The biggest casualty of the session was Ferrari's Kimi Räikkönen who got held up by Marcus Ericsson. Räikkönen recorded a lap of 1:42.173, which was not fast enough to get into Q3 as rain started soon after. Joining Räikkönen were Pastor Maldonado, the Force Indias of Nico Hülkenberg and Sergio Pérez and the Toro Rosso of Carlos Sainz Jr., as they could not improve on their original lap times due to the conditions.

After a delay of half an hour, the cars returned to the circuit, with the majority of the remaining ten drivers on intermediate tyres, while Romain Grosjean, Felipe Massa and Valtteri Bottas initially surveyed the circuit on wets before switching to the intermediates. Ultimately, Hamilton took pole position by 0.074 seconds ahead of Vettel, with Rosberg third. They were followed by the Red Bull cars of Daniel Ricciardo and Daniil Kvyat, while Toro Rosso's young driver Max Verstappen took sixth place. The rest of the top ten was completed by Massa, Grosjean, Bottas and Ericsson. It was the 40th pole position of Hamilton's career. After qualifying, Romain Grosjean was found to have left the pit lane in a different position to the one he left the garage, and so he received a two place grid penalty dropping him to tenth on the grid.

=== Qualifying classification ===
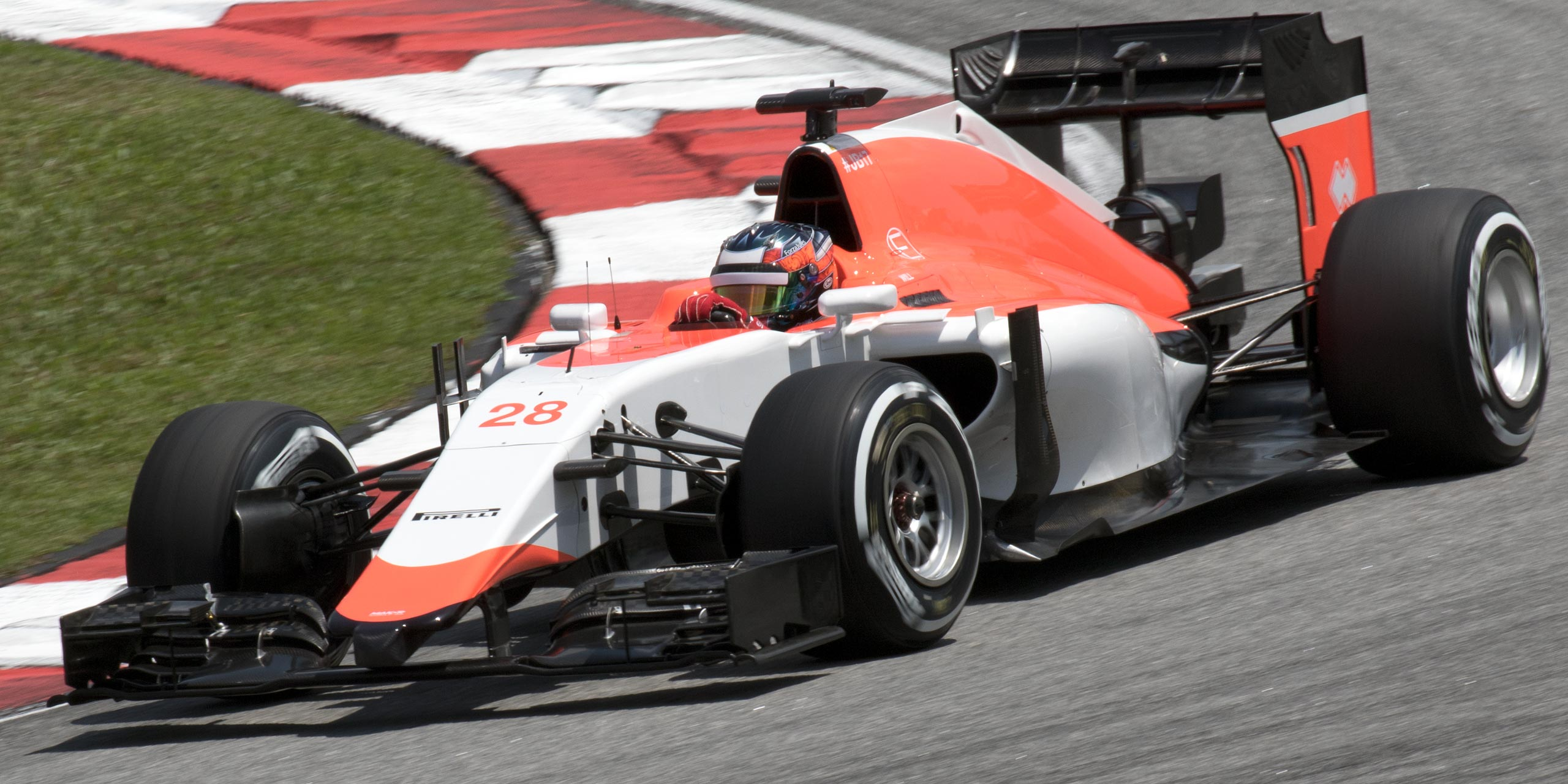
Will Stevens (pictured here during free practice) was unable to participate in the race.

Pos.	Car no.	Driver	Constructor	Qualifying times			Final grid
Pos.	Car no.	Driver	Constructor	Q1	Q2	Q3	Final grid
1	44	(United Kingdom) Lewis Hamilton	Mercedes	1:39.269	1:41.517	1:49.834	1
2	5	(Germany) Sebastian Vettel	Ferrari	1:39.814	1:39.632	1:49.908	2
3	6	(Germany) Nico Rosberg	Mercedes	1:39.374	1:39.377	1:50.299	3
4	3	(Australia) Daniel Ricciardo	Red Bull Racing-Renault	1:40.504	1:41.085	1:51.541	4
5	26	(Russia) Daniil Kvyat	Red Bull Racing-Renault	1:40.546	1:41.665	1:51.951	5
6	33	(Netherlands) Max Verstappen	Toro Rosso-Renault	1:40.793	1:41.430	1:51.981	6
7	19	(Brazil) Felipe Massa	Williams-Mercedes	1:40.543	1:41.230	1:52.473	7
8	8	(France) Romain Grosjean	Lotus-Mercedes	1:40.303	1:41.209	1:52.981	10^{1}
9	77	(Finland) Valtteri Bottas	Williams-Mercedes	1:40.249	1:40.650	1:53.179	8
10	9	(Sweden) Marcus Ericsson	Sauber-Ferrari	1:40.340	1:41.748	1:53.261	9
11	7	(Finland) Kimi Räikkönen	Ferrari	1:40.415	1:42.173		11
12	13	(Venezuela) Pastor Maldonado	Lotus-Mercedes	1:40.361	1:42.198		12
13	27	(Germany) Nico Hülkenberg	Force India-Mercedes	1:40.830	1:43.023		13
14	11	(Mexico) Sergio Pérez	Force India-Mercedes	1:41.036	1:43.469		14
15	55	(Spain) Carlos Sainz Jr.	Toro Rosso-Renault	1:39.814	1:43.701		15
16	12	(Brazil) Felipe Nasr	Sauber-Ferrari	1:41.308			16
17	22	(United Kingdom) Jenson Button	McLaren-Honda	1:41.636			17
18	14	(Spain) Fernando Alonso	McLaren-Honda	1:41.746			18
107% time: 1:46.217
—	98	(Spain) Roberto Merhi	Marussia-Ferrari	1:46.677			19^{2}
—	28	(United Kingdom) Will Stevens	Marussia-Ferrari	no time			20^{2}

Notes

- ^1— Romain Grosjean received a two place grid penalty for failing to "leave the pitlane in the order of his arrival."
- ^2— Roberto Merhi and Will Stevens were granted permission to start by race stewards.

== Race ==
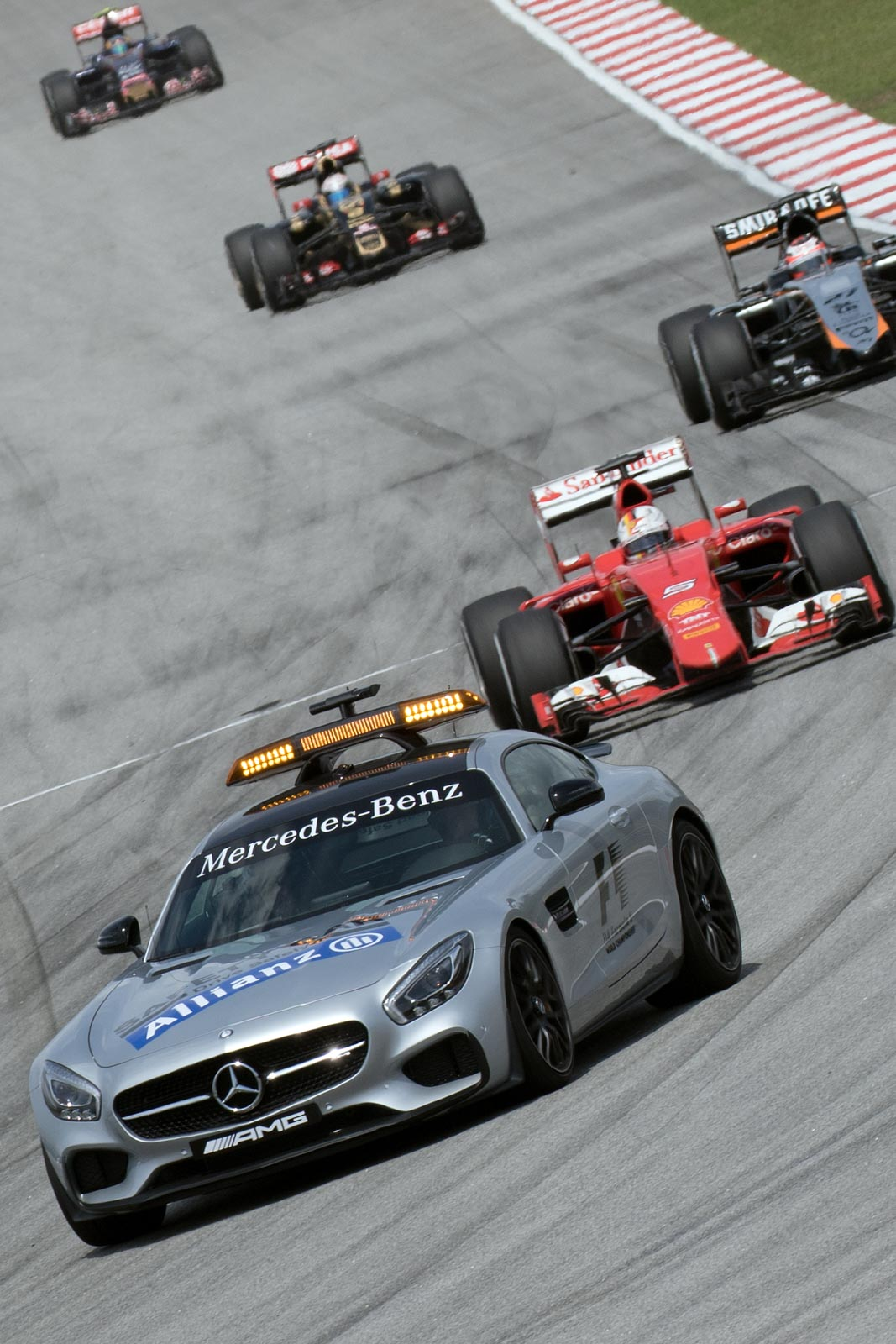
An early safety car phase proved to be a decisive factor in the race's outcome.

Temperatures on race day were very hot, with the track temperature at 61 °C (142 °F). Rain was possible, though less than in previous years, also due to the earlier starting time. Williams were hoping for a dry race, since qualifying showed they were still off the pace in wet conditions. Will Stevens, who missed qualifying due to a fuel system problem, was ultimately unable to participate in the race. Approximately 44,611 people attended the race.

At the start, Lewis Hamilton got away well, while Nico Rosberg challenged Sebastian Vettel for second place, but the Ferrari was able to come out on top. Both Pastor Maldonado and Kimi Räikkönen suffered punctures on lap one after contact with Valtteri Bottas and Felipe Nasr respectively and had to come in for a new set of tyres. Vettel was able to stay with the Mercedes of Hamilton over the first few laps. On lap four, Marcus Ericsson braked too late and spun in turn one, retiring from the race and bringing out the safety car. All but seven cars went into the pits to change tyres, including both Mercedes drivers, while Sebastian Vettel stayed out. When racing resumed on lap seven, Vettel led Nico Hülkenberg, Romain Grosjean, Carlos Sainz Jr. and Sergio Pérez, with Hamilton the first of the cars who made pit stops right behind.

Both Mercedes cars now made their way through the field, with Hamilton overtaking Hülkenberg for second position on the end of lap ten, now ten seconds down on race leader Vettel. Rosberg reached third position on lap 14, while Hamilton was unable to make significant gains on Vettel in front. The cars that had not used the safety car phase for their stops began to change tyres on lap 16, while Maldonado was handed a ten-second penalty for exceeding the safety car time. Meanwhile, the Red Bull cars showed signs of brake problems with brake dust exiting the wheels at the major braking points on both cars. Vettel came in for his first stop on lap 18, handing the lead back to Hamilton. Vettel rejoined in third place and began to close rapidly on second-placed Rosberg. Vettel made good use of his fresher tyres, overtaking Rosberg on lap 22 and setting out to do the same on Hamilton, shortly before the latter went into the pits for his second pit stop on lap 24. Meanwhile, Fernando Alonso retired due to engine problems on lap 21 while running in ninth place. With deteriorating front wing damage, Daniel Ricciardo let his teammate Daniil Kvyat through into eleventh place on the beginning of lap 26, only for Kvyat to be sent in a spin by Hülkenberg, who ran wide and hit the Red Bull in turn two. Both drivers were able to continue. The other Force India of Pérez sent Romain Grosjean's Lotus into a spin five laps later. Both Force India drivers were handed a ten-second penalty for their actions.

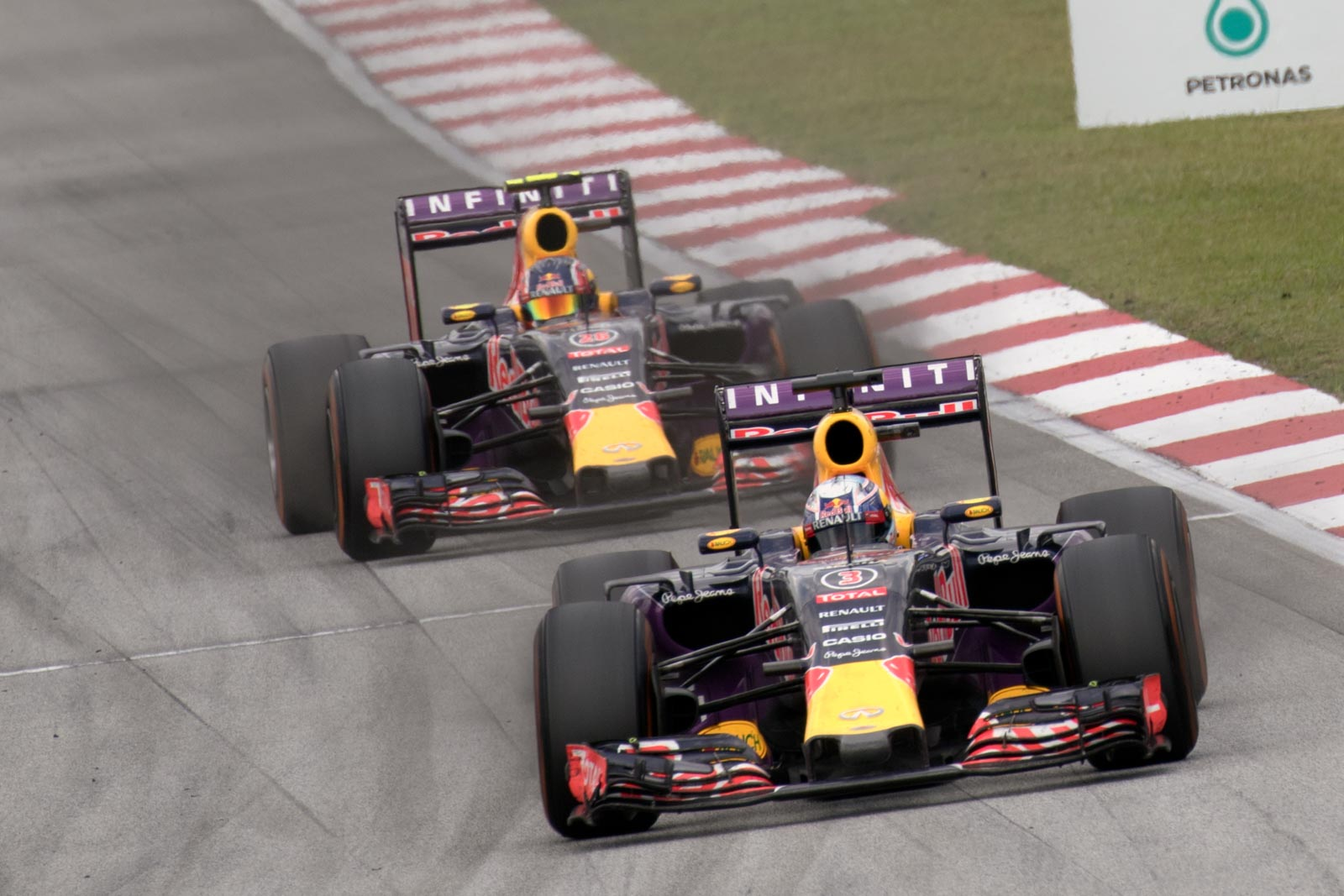
Both Red Bulls suffered from brake issues. Brake dust can be seen here blowing out from the brake discs.

Vettel made a pit stop for a second and final time on lap 38, handing the lead back to Hamilton, who came in for his final stop a lap later, emerging about twelve seconds behind Vettel in third place. His teammate Rosberg made a pit stop on lap 41, elevating Hamilton to second, who now started to close on Vettel. Jenson Button retired from the race on lap 40 due to a turbo failure, while Maldonado's bad day turned worse when he had to park his car suffering brake problems. Hamilton was unable to overcome the gap between himself and Vettel, leaving Vettel to take his 40th victory, the first since the 2013 Brazilian Grand Prix and his first with Ferrari. Bottas was able to overtake his teammate Felipe Massa on the final lap, after both Williams drivers had an uneventful race to finish fifth and sixth respectively. It was Ferrari's first win since the 2013 Spanish Grand Prix.

=== Post-race ===
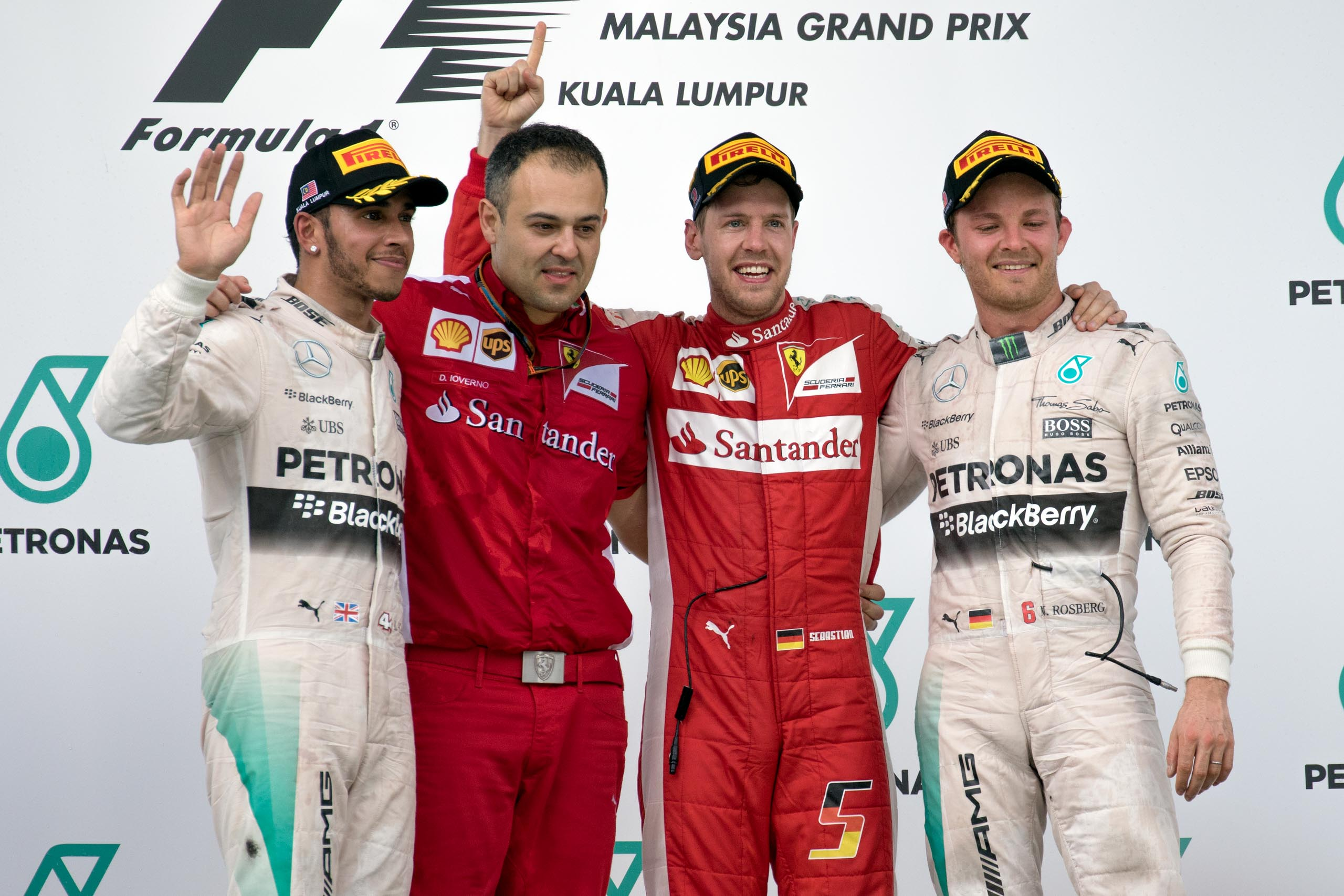
The podium after the race

Sebastian Vettel and Ferrari reacted emotionally to the victory, with Vettel unable to hold back tears on the podium. Speaking about the experience as a Ferrari driver, he told Eddie Jordan during the podium interview:

I remember when the gate opened in Maranello it was like a dream coming true. I remember the last time I was there was as a young kid watching Michael [Schumacher] over the fence driving around in the Ferrari and now I'm driving that very red car. It's incredible. The day today, the race, really spot on, the whole team was there, great strategy, great pace, we beat them fair and square [...].

Second placed Lewis Hamilton conceded that Ferrari and Vettel "did a fantastic job this weekend" and that he had not expected them to be as quick as they were.

The Ferrari team shared Vettel's enthusiasm, as they could be seen singing along to the Italian national anthem during the podium ceremony, led by team principal Maurizio Arrivabene. He later admitted he cried after receiving a congratulatory text message from Michael Schumacher's manager on behalf of his family. Comparisons between Vettel and Schumacher were omnipresent in the following days, with commentators pointing out that it took Vettel merely two races for his first win with the Scuderia, while Schumacher achieved a victory only in his seventh race. During the post-race press conference, Vettel expressed hope to emulate Schumacher's success at Ferrari and win the world championship.

The result was viewed as a welcome rebuttal of the fears of monotony voiced after the Australian Grand Prix. German newspaper Süddeutsche Zeitung declared Vettel's win was "the best the flagging sport could have hoped for".

Controversy arose when Force India's Bob Fernley accused Manor Marussia of intentionally only running one car during qualifying and the race and urged the FIA to investigate the matter. Manor rejected these claims, with sporting director Graeme Lowdon saying "I can guarantee you if that car could have moved, it would have raced".

Finishing seventh, Max Verstappen became the youngest driver to score World Championship points. Verstappen was quoted saying that it had been a "good day", while his father, former Formula One driver Jos Verstappen, commented: "I'm very pleased for what he has done today. I'm happy that he finished the race and the way he raced, he deserved it. I'm very proud."

As a result of the race, Vettel approached to three points of Hamilton in the Drivers' Championship, on 43 to 40 points. Rosberg followed in third with 33 points, 13 ahead of Felipe Massa. In the Constructors' Championship, Mercedes retained their lead at now 76 points, 24 clear of Ferrari, with Williams following in third on 30 points.

=== Race classification ===
Pos.	No.	Driver	Constructor	Laps	Time/Retired	Grid	Points
1	5	(Germany) Sebastian Vettel	Ferrari	56	1:41:05.793	2	25
2	44	(United Kingdom) Lewis Hamilton	Mercedes	56	+8.569	1	18
3	6	(Germany) Nico Rosberg	Mercedes	56	+12.310	3	15
4	7	(Finland) Kimi Räikkönen	Ferrari	56	+53.822	11	12
5	77	(Finland) Valtteri Bottas	Williams-Mercedes	56	+1:10.409	8	10
6	19	(Brazil) Felipe Massa	Williams-Mercedes	56	+1:13.586	7	8
7	33	(Netherlands) Max Verstappen	Toro Rosso-Renault	56	+1:37.762	6	6
8	55	(Spain) Carlos Sainz Jr.	Toro Rosso-Renault	55	+1 Lap	15	4
9	26	(Russia) Daniil Kvyat	Red Bull Racing-Renault	55	+1 Lap	5	2
10	3	(Australia) Daniel Ricciardo	Red Bull Racing-Renault	55	+1 Lap	4	1
11	8	(France) Romain Grosjean	Lotus-Mercedes	55	+1 Lap	10	
12	12	(Brazil) Felipe Nasr	Sauber-Ferrari	55	+1 Lap	16	
13	11	(Mexico) Sergio Pérez	Force India-Mercedes	55	+1 Lap	14	
14	27	(Germany) Nico Hülkenberg	Force India-Mercedes	55	+1 Lap	13	
15	98	(Spain) Roberto Merhi	Marussia-Ferrari	53	+3 Laps	19	
Ret	13	(Venezuela) Pastor Maldonado	Lotus-Mercedes	46	Brakes	12	
Ret	22	(United Kingdom) Jenson Button	McLaren-Honda	40	Turbo	17	
Ret	14	(Spain) Fernando Alonso	McLaren-Honda	20	Power Unit	18	
Ret	9	(Sweden) Marcus Ericsson	Sauber-Ferrari	3	Spun off	9	
DNS	28	(United Kingdom) Will Stevens	Marussia-Ferrari	0	Fuel system	—	

== Championship standings after the race ==
Drivers' Championship standings

	Pos.	Driver	Points
	1	(United Kingdom) Lewis Hamilton	43
1	2	(Germany) Sebastian Vettel	40
1	3	(Germany) Nico Rosberg	33
	4	(Brazil) Felipe Massa	20
7	5	(Finland) Kimi Räikkönen	12

Constructors' Championship standings

	Pos.	Constructor	Points
	1	(Germany) Mercedes	76
	2	(Italy) Ferrari	52
1	3	(United Kingdom) Williams-Mercedes	30
1	4	(Switzerland) Sauber-Ferrari	14
2	5	(Italy) Toro Rosso-Renault	12
Sources:

- Note: Only the top five positions are included for both sets of standings.

== See also ==
- 2015 TCR International Series Sepang round

Previous race: 2015 Australian Grand Prix	FIA Formula One World Championship; 2015 season	Next race: 2015 Chinese Grand Prix
Previous race: 2014 Malaysian Grand Prix	Malaysian Grand Prix	Next race: 2016 Malaysian Grand Prix
