= 2016 Malaysian Grand Prix =

16th round of the 2016 Formula One season

Race 16 of 21 in the 2016 Formula One World Championship
| ← Previous race | Next race → |

Race details
- Date: 2 October 2016
- Official name: 2016 Formula 1 Petronas Malaysia Grand Prix
- Location: Sepang International Circuit, Sepang, Selangor, Malaysia
- Course: Permanent racing facility
- Course length: 5.543 km (3.444 miles)
- Distance: 56 laps, 310.408 km (192.879 miles)
- Weather: Sunny; 33 °C (91 °F) air temperature 49 °C (120 °F) track temperature 2.8 m/s (9.2 ft/s) wind from the west
- Attendance: 88,828 (Weekend) 45,000 (Race Day)

Pole position
| Driver | (United Kingdom) Lewis Hamilton | Mercedes |
- Time: 1:32.850

Fastest lap
| Driver | (Germany) Nico Rosberg | Mercedes |
- Time: 1:36.424 on lap 44

Podium
| First | (Australia) Daniel Ricciardo | Red Bull Racing-TAG Heuer |
| Second | (Netherlands) Max Verstappen | Red Bull Racing-TAG Heuer |
| Third | (Germany) Nico Rosberg | Mercedes |

The 2016 Malaysian Grand Prix (formally known as the 2016 Formula 1 Petronas Malaysia Grand Prix) was a Formula One motor race held on 2 October 2016 at the Sepang International Circuit in Selangor, Malaysia. The race marked the thirty-fifth running of the Malaysian Grand Prix and the eighteenth time that the race had been run as a World Championship event since the first race in 1999.

Daniel Ricciardo won the race, with teammate Max Verstappen finishing second to secure Red Bull Racing's first 1–2 finish since the introduction of hybrid engines in 2014 and the team's last one until the 2022 Emilia Romagna Grand Prix. Rosberg completed the podium, extending his championship lead to twenty-three points following the retirement of Lewis Hamilton. This was Ricciardo's first win since the 2014 Belgian Grand Prix.

== Report ==
=== Background ===
The race was moved from its March date to October to allow organisers the opportunity to upgrade the circuit. The circuit was resurfaced, while drainage was improved to decrease the possibility of standing water from forming on the circuit. Nine corners were re-profiled, introducing negative camber to emphasise mechanical rather than aerodynamic grip, and the drop at the apex of turn two removed.

=== Championship standings before the race ===
Mercedes driver Nico Rosberg entered the race leading the World Drivers' Championship by eight points, having reclaimed the championship lead from teammate Lewis Hamilton at the previous race in Singapore. Mercedes led Red Bull-TAG Heuer in the World Constructors' Championship by 220 points.

=== Race ===
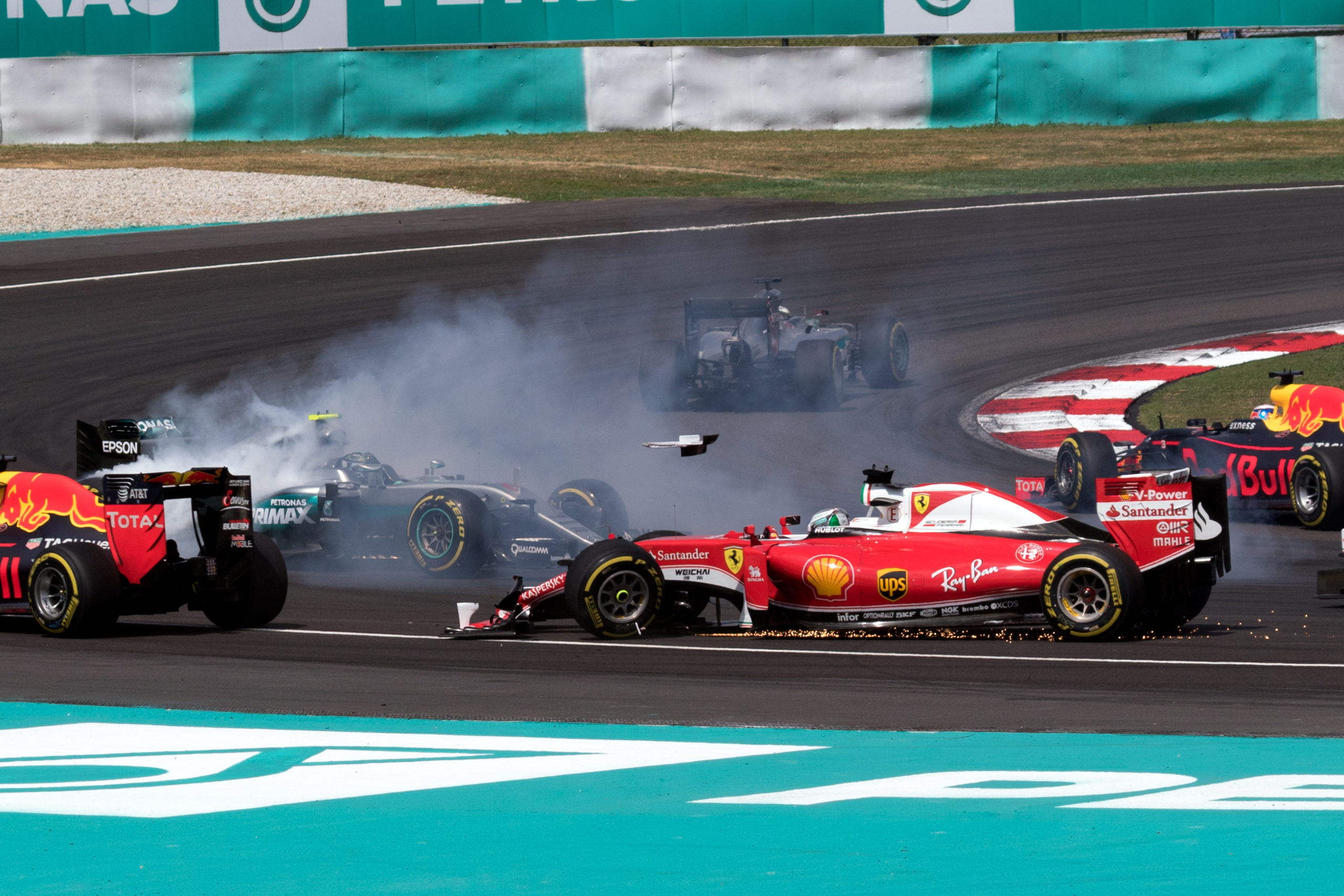
The incident between Nico Rosberg and Sebastian Vettel on the opening lap

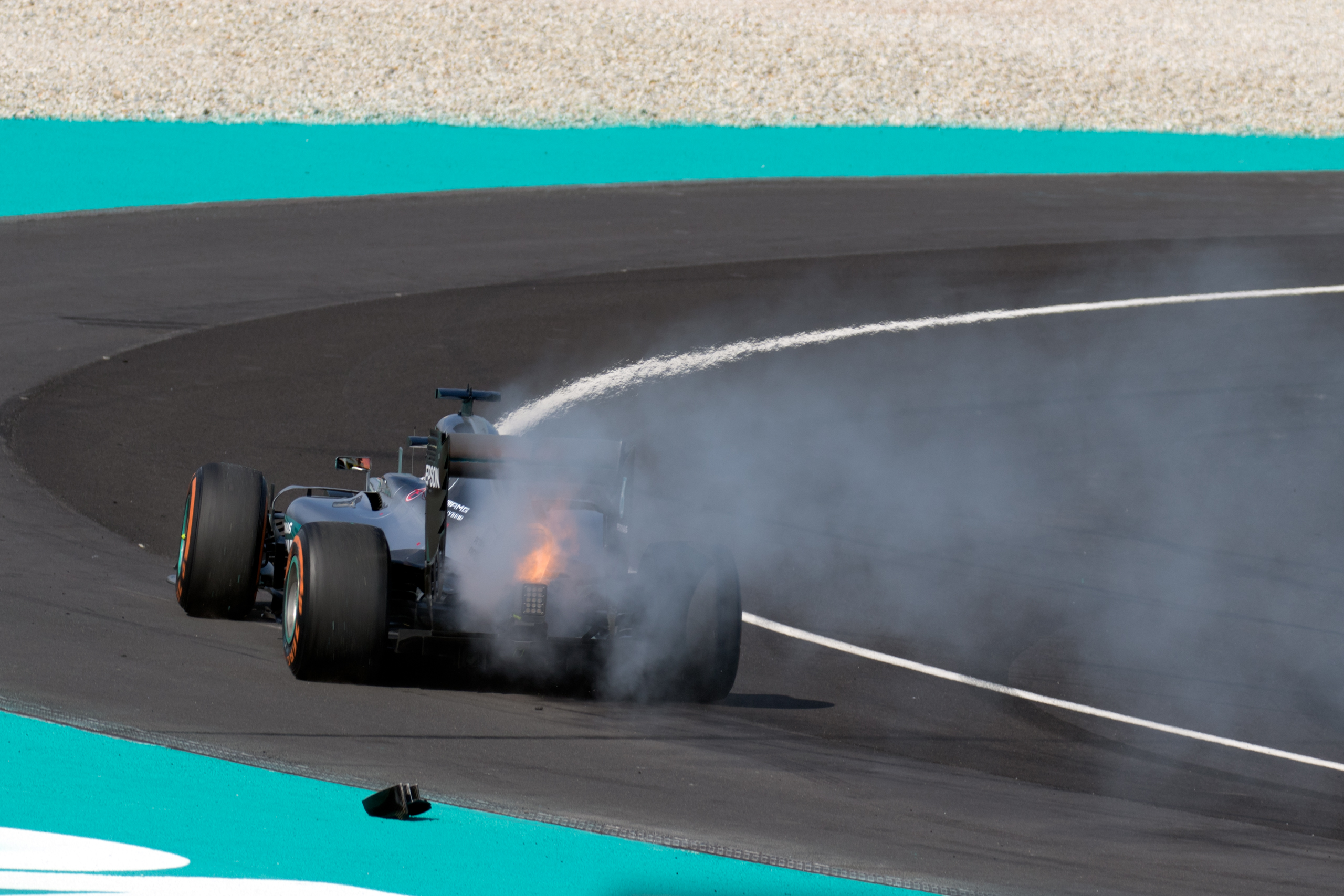
Lewis Hamilton's engine failure while in the lead later proved to be a decisive moment in the championship.

At the start of the race, Sebastian Vettel collided with Nico Rosberg going into turn one, causing Rosberg to go into a spin to the back of the grid while Vettel damaged his front-left suspension in the process, retiring after getting to an escape road a few corners later. On lap 8, Romain Grosjean spun into the gravel trap due to brake failure once again, prematurely ending his race. Later, on lap 41, Lewis Hamilton's engine failed while he was in the lead of the race, forcing him to retire. Esteban Gutiérrez also retired when his front-left wheel came off the car in the latter stages of the race. Daniel Ricciardo, who inherited the lead of the race when Hamilton's engine failed, went on to win the race. It was the fourth win of his F1 career. Max Verstappen finished second, giving Red Bull Racing their first one-two since Brazil in 2013, with Nico Rosberg recovering to finish third from his spin on lap 1. For the next race in Japan, Vettel was handed a three-place grid penalty for causing the collision with Rosberg.

=== Post-race ===
Nine Australian men, subsequently dubbed the 'Budgie Nine' by Australian media, were arrested for intentional insult and public indecency after celebrating Ricciardo's win by stripping to their 'budgie smuggler' swimming trunks, decorated with the Malaysian flag, and drinking beer from their shoes. Ricciardo said that the nine had not realized the effect their actions would have and called for them to be released. After three days in custody, the nine were charged with the lesser offence of public nuisance and released. The briefs had been made in Australia, not Malaysia.

== Classification ==
=== Qualifying ===
| Pos. | Car no. | Driver | Constructor | Qualifying times | | | Final grid |
| Pos. | Car no. | Driver | Constructor | Q1 | Q2 | Q3 | Final grid |
|---|---|---|---|---|---|---|---|
| 1 | 44 | (United Kingdom) Lewis Hamilton | Mercedes | 1:34.444 | 1:33.046 | 1:32.850 | 1 |
| 2 | 6 | (Germany) Nico Rosberg | Mercedes | 1:34.460 | 1:33.609 | 1:33.264 | 2 |
| 3 | 33 | (Netherlands) Max Verstappen | Red Bull Racing-TAG Heuer | 1:35.443 | 1:33.775 | 1:33.420 | 3 |
| 4 | 3 | (Australia) Daniel Ricciardo | Red Bull Racing-TAG Heuer | 1:35.079 | 1:33.888 | 1:33.467 | 4 |
| 5 | 5 | (Germany) Sebastian Vettel | Ferrari | 1:34.557 | 1:33.972 | 1:33.584 | 5 |
| 6 | 7 | (Finland) Kimi Räikkönen | Ferrari | 1:34.556 | 1:33.903 | 1:33.632 | 6 |
| 7 | 11 | (Mexico) Sergio Pérez | Force India-Mercedes | 1:35.068 | 1:34.538 | 1:34.319 | 7 |
| 8 | 27 | (Germany) Nico Hülkenberg | Force India-Mercedes | 1:34.827 | 1:34.441 | 1:34.489 | 8 |
| 9 | 22 | (United Kingdom) Jenson Button | McLaren-Honda | 1:35.267 | 1:34.431 | 1:34.518 | 9 |
| 10 | 19 | (Brazil) Felipe Massa | Williams-Mercedes | 1:35.267 | 1:34.422 | 1:34.671 | 10 |
| 11 | 77 | (Finland) Valtteri Bottas | Williams-Mercedes | 1:35.166 | 1:34.577 | | 11 |
| 12 | 8 | (France) Romain Grosjean | Haas-Ferrari | 1:35.400 | 1:35.001 | | 12 |
| 13 | 21 | (Mexico) Esteban Gutiérrez | Haas-Ferrari | 1:35.658 | 1:35.097 | | 13 |
| 14 | 20 | (Denmark) Kevin Magnussen | Renault | 1:35.593 | 1:35.277 | | 14 |
| 15 | 26 | (Russia) Daniil Kvyat | Toro Rosso-Ferrari | 1:35.695 | 1:35.369 | | 15 |
| 16 | 55 | (Spain) Carlos Sainz Jr. | Toro Rosso-Ferrari | 1:35.605 | 1:35.374 | | 16 |
| 17 | 9 | (Sweden) Marcus Ericsson | Sauber-Ferrari | 1:35.816 | | | 17 |
| 18 | 12 | (Brazil) Felipe Nasr | Sauber-Ferrari | 1:35.949 | | | 18 |
| 19 | 30 | (United Kingdom) Jolyon Palmer | Renault | 1:35.999 | | | 19 |
| 20 | 31 | (France) Esteban Ocon | MRT-Mercedes | 1:36.451 | | | 20 |
| 21 | 94 | (Germany) Pascal Wehrlein | MRT-Mercedes | 1:36.587 | | | 21 |
| 22 | 14 | (Spain) Fernando Alonso | McLaren-Honda | 1:37.155 | | | 22^{1} |
107% time: 1:41.055

Notes:

- ^1 – Fernando Alonso penalised 45 grid places for unscheduled power unit element changes.

=== Race ===
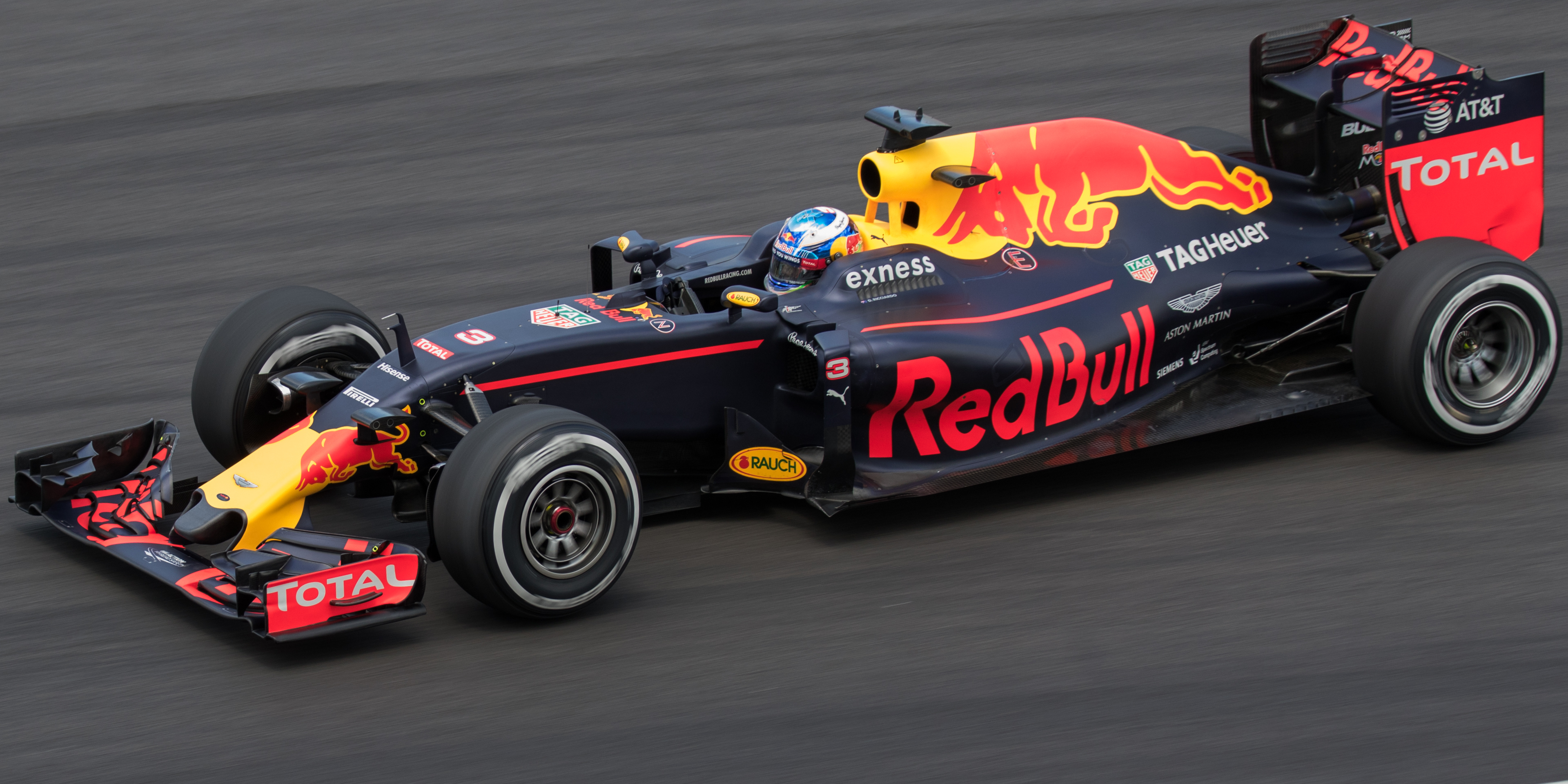
Daniel Ricciardo won the race for Red Bull.

| Pos. | No. | Driver | Constructor | Laps | Time/Retired | Grid | Points |
|---|---|---|---|---|---|---|---|
| 1 | 3 | (Australia) Daniel Ricciardo | Red Bull Racing-TAG Heuer | 56 | 1:37:12.776 | 4 | 25 |
| 2 | 33 | (Netherlands) Max Verstappen | Red Bull Racing-TAG Heuer | 56 | +2.443 | 3 | 18 |
| 3 | 6 | (Germany) Nico Rosberg | Mercedes | 56 | +25.516^{1} | 2 | 15 |
| 4 | 7 | (Finland) Kimi Räikkönen | Ferrari | 56 | +28.785 | 6 | 12 |
| 5 | 77 | (Finland) Valtteri Bottas | Williams-Mercedes | 56 | +1:01.582 | 11 | 10 |
| 6 | 11 | (Mexico) Sergio Pérez | Force India-Mercedes | 56 | +1:03.794 | 7 | 8 |
| 7 | 14 | (Spain) Fernando Alonso | McLaren-Honda | 56 | +1:05.205 | 22 | 6 |
| 8 | 27 | (Germany) Nico Hülkenberg | Force India-Mercedes | 56 | +1:14.062 | 8 | 4 |
| 9 | 22 | (United Kingdom) Jenson Button | McLaren-Honda | 56 | +1:21.816 | 9 | 2 |
| 10 | 30 | (United Kingdom) Jolyon Palmer | Renault | 56 | +1:35.466 | 19 | 1 |
| 11 | 55 | (Spain) Carlos Sainz Jr. | Toro Rosso-Ferrari | 56 | +1:38.878 | 16 | |
| 12 | 9 | (Sweden) Marcus Ericsson | Sauber-Ferrari | 55 | +1 Lap | 17 | |
| 13 | 19 | (Brazil) Felipe Massa | Williams-Mercedes | 55 | +1 Lap | PL | |
| 14 | 26 | (Russia) Daniil Kvyat | Toro Rosso-Ferrari | 55 | +1 Lap | 15 | |
| 15 | 94 | (Germany) Pascal Wehrlein | MRT-Mercedes | 55 | +1 Lap | 21 | |
| 16 | 31 | (France) Esteban Ocon | MRT-Mercedes | 55 | +1 Lap^{2} | 20 | |
| Ret | 12 | (Brazil) Felipe Nasr | Sauber-Ferrari | 46 | Brakes/Power loss | 18 | |
| Ret | 44 | (United Kingdom) Lewis Hamilton | Mercedes | 40 | Engine | 1 | |
| Ret | 21 | (Mexico) Esteban Gutiérrez | Haas-Ferrari | 39 | Wheel | 13 | |
| Ret | 20 | (Denmark) Kevin Magnussen | Renault | 17 | Power loss | 14 | |
| Ret | 8 | (France) Romain Grosjean | Haas-Ferrari | 7 | Brakes | 12 | |
| Ret | 5 | (Germany) Sebastian Vettel | Ferrari | 0 | Collision | 5 | |

Notes

- ^1 – Nico Rosberg had ten seconds added to his race time for causing an avoidable collision.
- ^2 – Esteban Ocon received two five-second penalties for speeding in the pit lane.

== Championship standings after the race ==
Drivers' Championship standings

| | Pos. | Driver | Points |
|---|---|---|---|
| | 1 | (Germany) **Nico Rosberg*** | 288 |
| | 2 | (United Kingdom) **Lewis Hamilton*** | 265 |
| | 3 | (Australia) **Daniel Ricciardo*** | 204 |
| 1 | 4 | (Finland) Kimi Räikkönen | 160 |
| 1 | 5 | (Germany) Sebastian Vettel | 153 |

Constructors' Championship standings

| Pos. | Constructor | Points |
|---|---|---|
| 1 | (Germany) **Mercedes*** | 553 |
| 2 | (Austria) **Red Bull Racing-TAG Heuer*** | 359 |
| 3 | (Italy) Ferrari | 313 |
| 4 | Force India-Mercedes | 124 |
| 5 | (United Kingdom) Williams-Mercedes | 121 |

- Note: Only the top five positions are included for both sets of standings.
- Competitors in bold and marked with an asterisk still had a mathematical chance of becoming World Champion.

== See also ==
- 2016 Sepang GP2 Series round
- 2016 Sepang GP3 Series round
- 2016 TCR International Series Sepang round

| Previous race: 2016 Singapore Grand Prix | FIA Formula One World Championship; 2016 season | Next race: 2016 Japanese Grand Prix |
| Previous race: 2015 Malaysian Grand Prix | Malaysian Grand Prix | Next race: 2017 Malaysian Grand Prix |
