= Malaysian Grand Prix =

Motor race

- Sepang International Circuit

Race information
- Number of times held: 36
- First held: 1962
- Last held: 2017
- Most wins (drivers): (Hong Kong) John MacDonald (4) (Germany) Sebastian Vettel (4)
- Most wins (constructors): (Italy) Ferrari (7)
- Circuit length: 5.543 km (3.444 miles)
- Race length: 310.408 km (192.879 miles)
- Laps: 56

Last race (2017)

Pole position
- (United Kingdom) Lewis Hamilton; Mercedes; 1:30.076

Podium
- 1. (Netherlands) M. Verstappen; Red Bull Racing-TAG Heuer; 1:30:01.290; 2. (United Kingdom) L. Hamilton; Mercedes; +12.770; 3. (Australia) D. Ricciardo; Red Bull Racing-TAG Heuer; +22.519

Fastest lap
- (Germany) Sebastian Vettel; Ferrari; 1:34.080

The Malaysian Grand Prix (Malay: Grand Prix Malaysia, officially the Malaysia Grand Prix in 1963–1965 and 2011–2017, and Malayan Grand Prix in 1962) was an annual auto race held in Malaysia. It was part of the Formula One World Championship from 1999 to 2017 and it was held during these years at the Sepang International Circuit. The Malaysian Grand Prix was held annually from 1962 to 1964 in Singapore, while it was a member of the Malaysian federation. Subsequent Grands Prix were held in Peninsular Malaysia only.

== History ==
=== Singapore and Shah Alam ===
From 1962 to 1965 an annual race weekend for motorcycles and Formula Libre cars was held at the Thomson Road circuit in Singapore, named the Malaysia Grand Prix. After Singapore gained independence from Malaysia in 1965 the event was renamed the Singapore Grand Prix and continued until 1973.

Between Singapore's departure from the Malaysian federation and the opening of Sepang Circuit, Malaysia hosted a range of other racing categories in the Malaysian Grand Prix at Shah Alam's own circuit between 1968 and 1995 including Formula Libre (1968), Tasman Formula (1969–1972), Formula Atlantic (1973–1975), Formula Two (1977), and Formula Pacific (1978–1982).

=== Sepang International Circuit ===
As part of a series of major infrastructure projects in the 1990s under Mahathir Mohamad's government, the Sepang International Circuit was constructed between 1997 and 1999 close to Putrajaya, the then-newly founded administrative capital of the country, with the intent of hosting the Malaysian Grand Prix. Similar to the country's other tracks, the circuit is known for its unpredictable humid tropical weather, varying from clear furnace-hot days to tropical rain storms.

The inaugural Grand Prix at Sepang was held in 1999, and saw Michael Schumacher return to the sport after his absence due to a broken leg sustained at that year's British Grand Prix. Ferrari dominated the race, with Schumacher handing the victory to title-hopeful teammate Eddie Irvine, only for both Ferraris to be disqualified due to a technical irregularity, before later being reinstated.

From 2001, the Malaysian Grand Prix moved from the end of the season to the beginning, which has seen some topsy-turvy results as teams and drivers got to grips with their new equipment, with many races heavily influenced by the winners and losers of the scramble for position into the tight double hairpin bend at the first corner.

The 2001 event was hit by a heavy rainstorm in the middle of the race which made conditions very difficult. Conditions were so bad that the two Ferraris of Michael Schumacher and Rubens Barrichello spun off almost simultaneously at the same corner. Remarkably, they both recovered to score a Ferrari 1–2, because for a long time they were nearly 5 seconds per lap faster than anyone else on the field. Elsewhere, the race was even surprisingly led by Jos Verstappen, who started 18th but managed to be 6th by the end of lap 1. However, as the track began to dry, he fell back to seventh, but his efforts to keep positions were memorable.

On 8 April 2007, shortly before the 2007 Malaysian Grand Prix, Formula One president Bernie Ecclestone was quoted as stating that the circuit was getting "shabby" and "a bit tired" from the lack of care, describing it as "an old house that needs a bit of redecorating". He noted that the circuit itself is not the issue, but rather the surrounding environment; rubbish is said to be littered all over the place, potentially damaging the circuit's good reputation when it was opened in 1999.

The day before, Malaysian Prime Minister Abdullah Ahmad Badawi had met Ecclestone to discuss an extension of the Formula One contract beyond 2010. While the government had been given an additional extension to host the Grand Prix until 2015, the government was still mulling the offer, as of 23 April 2007. The circuit was given a renewed contract in 2006 to organise the Malaysian Grand Prix for another five years.

On 13 February 2008, the management of the Sepang International Circuit announced its aim to become Formula One's second night race from 2009 after Singapore, following discussions about buying a floodlighting system. Mokhzani Mahathir, the chairman of the circuit, was quoted as saying that the lights "might be custom made for the circuit". However, the organisers ended up settling for a late-afternoon start time.

The 2009 Malaysian Grand Prix was held around sunset, starting at 17:00 local time (09:00 UTC). This proved disastrous due to heavy rainfall. The race was red-flagged and ultimately not restarted due to the low light level making it through the clouds. The race ended on lap 33, and with the regulations requiring 42 laps for full points, both drivers' and constructors' results were halved in relation to points. Later that night, Jamiroquai made an appearance in a concert for the weekend.

On 7 April 2017, it was announced that the 2017 race would be the swansong of the Malaysian Grand Prix. The race's contract was due to expire in 2018, but its future had been under threat due to rising hosting fees and declining ticket sales. Malaysia's youth and sports minister at the time Khairy Jamaluddin said on Twitter: "I think we should stop hosting the F1. At least for a while. Cost too high, returns limited. When we first hosted the F1 it was a big deal. First in Asia outside Japan. Now so many venues. No first mover advantage. Not a novelty." The BBC reported that "Malaysia had struggled in recent years to attract a significant crowd, its appeal having been damaged by the more glamorous night-time event on a street track in Singapore."

=== F1 activity at Sepang after 2017 ===
In August 2025, Malaysia's Youth and Sports Minister Hannah Yeoh said that there were no immediate plans to revive the Malaysian Grand Prix, citing high hosting fees demanded by Liberty Media and significant investments to maintain the Sepang International Circuit to the necessary standards. Yeoh argued that these funds represented a significant opportunity cost better allocated toward athlete development and other local sports programmes. Additionally, she noted that a crowded global race calendar and direct regional competition such as Singapore made securing a viable, sustainable permanent slot highly improbable unless private corporate sponsors stepped forward to fully underwrite the event.

The geopolitical landscape shifted in July 2026 when The Athletic reported that the Sepang circuit had emerged as an alternative venue for the 2026 Bahrain Grand Prix after its originally scheduled April date was called off due to the 2026 Iran war. Following this disclosure, the Youth and Sports Minister, Mohammed Taufiq Johari, confirmed that the government was actively evaluating the emergency proposal to host a replacement event. Prime Minister Anwar Ibrahim subsequently signaled that a definitive decision was imminent, while BBC Formula One correspondent Andrew Benson broke news that a provisional agreement had been brokered to stage the race in October, subject to a formal regulatory sign-off.

On 26 July 2026, Formula One and the FIA officially confirmed that the Sepang International Circuit would host the rescheduled race from 2 to 4 October 2026, filling the calendar gap between the Azerbaijan and Singapore Grand Prix. Because the Bahraini government remained the primary financial promoter and underwrote the replacement costs, the event uniquely retained its original commercial identity rather than being designated as a standalone Malaysian Grand Prix. Consequently, the event is officially known as the "2026 Formula 1 Gulf Air Bahrain Grand Prix in Malaysia". Bahrain also retained all ticket pricing rights and race proceeds.

== Winners ==
=== By year ===
A pink background indicates an event which was not part of the Formula One World Championship.

Year	Driver	Car	Class	Location	Report
1962	(Singapore) Yong Nam Kee	Jaguar E-Type		Thomson Road	Report
1963	(Hong Kong) Albert Poon	Lotus 23		Thomson Road	Report
1964	Rained out after 7 laps with no winner declared.				
1965	(Hong Kong) Albert Poon	Lotus 23		Thomson Road	Report
1966 – 1967	Not held as Thomson Road circuit was now in an independent Singapore. Thomson Road circuit held the Singapore Grand Prix until 1973.				
1968	(Indonesia) Hengkie Iriawan	Elfin 600-Ford	Formula Libre	Shah Alam	Report
1969	(Malaysia) Tony Maw	Elfin 600-Ford	Tasman Formula	Shah Alam	Report
1970	(Hong Kong) John MacDonald	Brabham-Ford	Tasman Formula	Shah Alam	Report
1971	(Hong Kong) John MacDonald	Brabham-Ford	Tasman Formula	Shah Alam	Report
1972	(United States) Harvey Simon	Elfin-Ford	Tasman Formula	Shah Alam	Report
1973	(Malaysia) Sonny Rajah	March-Ford	Formula Atlantic	Shah Alam	Report
1974	(Hong Kong) John MacDonald	Ralt-Ford	Formula Atlantic	Shah Alam	Report
1975	(Hong Kong) John MacDonald	Ralt-Ford	Formula Atlantic	Shah Alam	Report
1976	Not held				
1977	**(France)** Patrick Tambay	March-BMW	Formula Two	Shah Alam	Report
1978	(New Zealand) Graeme Lawrence	March-Ford	Formula Pacific	Shah Alam	Report
1979	(New Zealand) Ken Smith	March-Ford	Formula Pacific	Shah Alam	Report
1980	(New Zealand) Steve Millen	Ralt-Ford	Formula Pacific	Shah Alam	Report
1981	(Australia) Andrew Miedecke	Ralt-Ford	Formula Pacific	Shah Alam	Report
1982	(Australia) Andrew Miedecke	Ralt-Ford	Formula Pacific	Shah Alam	Report
1983 – 1998	Not held				
1999	(United Kingdom) Eddie Irvine	Ferrari	Formula One	Sepang	Report
2000	(Germany) Michael Schumacher	Ferrari	Formula One	Sepang	Report
2001	(Germany) Michael Schumacher	Ferrari	Formula One	Sepang	Report
2002	(Germany) Ralf Schumacher	Williams-BMW	Formula One	Sepang	Report
2003	(Finland) Kimi Räikkönen	McLaren-Mercedes	Formula One	Sepang	Report
2004	(Germany) Michael Schumacher	Ferrari	Formula One	Sepang	Report
2005	(Spain) Fernando Alonso	Renault	Formula One	Sepang	Report
2006	(Italy) Giancarlo Fisichella	Renault	Formula One	Sepang	Report
2007	(Spain) Fernando Alonso	McLaren-Mercedes	Formula One	Sepang	Report
2008	(Finland) Kimi Räikkönen	Ferrari	Formula One	Sepang	Report
2009	(United Kingdom) Jenson Button	Brawn-Mercedes	Formula One	Sepang	Report
2010	(Germany) Sebastian Vettel	Red Bull-Renault	Formula One	Sepang	Report
2011	(Germany) Sebastian Vettel	Red Bull-Renault	Formula One	Sepang	Report
2012	(Spain) Fernando Alonso	Ferrari	Formula One	Sepang	Report
2013	(Germany) Sebastian Vettel	Red Bull-Renault	Formula One	Sepang	Report
2014	(United Kingdom) Lewis Hamilton	Mercedes	Formula One	Sepang	Report
2015	(Germany) Sebastian Vettel	Ferrari	Formula One	Sepang	Report
2016	(Australia) Daniel Ricciardo	Red Bull Racing-TAG Heuer	Formula One	Sepang	Report
2017	(Netherlands) Max Verstappen	Red Bull Racing-TAG Heuer	Formula One	Sepang	Report

=== Repeat winners (drivers) ===
A pink background indicates an event which was not part of the Formula One World Championship.

Drivers in bold are competing in the Formula One championship in 2026.

Wins	Driver	Years won
4	(Hong Kong) John MacDonald	1970, 1971, 1973, 1975
4	(Germany) Sebastian Vettel	2010, 2011, 2013, 2015
3	(Germany) Michael Schumacher	2000, 2001, 2004
3	**(Spain) Fernando Alonso**	2005, 2007, 2012
2	(Hong Kong) Albert Poon	1963, 1965
2	(Australia) Andrew Miedecke	1981, 1982
2	(Finland) Kimi Räikkönen	2003, 2008

=== Repeat winners (constructors) ===
A pink background indicates an event which was not part of the Formula One World Championship.

Teams in bold are competing in the Formula One championship in 2026.

Wins	Constructor	Years won
7	**(Italy) Ferrari**	1999, 2000, 2001, 2004, 2008, 2012, 2015
5	**(Austria) Red Bull**	2010, 2011, 2013, 2016, 2017
4	(United Kingdom) March	1972, 1977, 1978, 1979
4	(United Kingdom) Ralt	1975, 1980, 1981, 1982
3	(United Kingdom) Brabham	1970, 1971, 1973
2	(United Kingdom) Lotus	1963, 1965
2	(Australia) Elfin	1968, 1969
2	(France) Renault	2005, 2006
2	**(United Kingdom) McLaren**	2003, 2007

=== Repeat winners (engine manufacturers) ===
A pink background indicates an event which was not part of the Formula One World Championship.

Manufacturers in bold are competing in the Formula One championship in 2026.

Wins	Constructor	Years won
15	(United States) Ford *	1963, 1965, 1968, 1969, 1970, 1971, 1972, 1973, 1974, 1975, 1978, 1979, 1980, 1981, 1982
7	**(Italy) Ferrari**	1999, 2000, 2001, 2004, 2008, 2012, 2015
5	(France) Renault	2005, 2006, 2010, 2011, 2013
4	(Germany) Mercedes **	2003, 2007, 2009, 2014
2	(Germany) BMW	1977, 2002
2	(Switzerland) TAG Heuer ***	2016, 2017

* Built by Cosworth

** Built by Ilmor in 2003

*** Built by Renault

== Support races ==
Formula BMW Asia and Porsche Carrera Cup Asia have supported the Malaysian Grand Prix since 2003.
