= 2026 Bahrain Grand Prix in Malaysia =

Formula One motor race

Race 16 of 23 in the 2026 Formula One World Championship
| ← Previous race | Next race → |
- Layout of the Sepang International Circuit

Race details
- Date: 4 October 2026
- Official name: Formula 1 Gulf Air Bahrain Grand Prix in Malaysia 2026
- Location: Sepang International Circuit; Sepang, Selangor, Malaysia
- Course: Permanent racing facility
- Course length: 5.543 km (3.444 miles)
- Distance: 55 laps, 304.874 km (189.440 miles)
- Scheduled distance: 56 laps, 310.417 km (192.884 miles)
- Weather: Heavy rain pre-race, drying quickly following restart. Max. ambient temp. 28.5°C, max. track temp. 35.3°C.
- Attendance: 261,000

Pole position
| Driver | (Netherlands) Max Verstappen | Red Bull Racing-Red Bull Ford |
- Time: 1:35.130

Fastest lap
| Driver | (Netherlands) Max Verstappen | Red Bull Racing-Red Bull Ford |
- Time: 1:38.220 on lap 55

Podium
| First | (Netherlands) Max Verstappen | Red Bull Racing-Red Bull Ford |
| Second | (Italy) Kimi Antonelli | Mercedes |
| Third | (United Kingdom) Lewis Hamilton | Ferrari |

The 2026 Bahrain Grand Prix in Malaysia (officially known as the Formula 1 Gulf Air Bahrain Grand Prix in Malaysia 2026) was a Formula One motor race held on 4 October 2026 at the Sepang International Circuit in Sepang, Selangor, Malaysia. It was the sixteenth round of the 2026 Formula One World Championship and the first Formula One race at Sepang since 2017.

The race was originally scheduled as the 2026 Bahrain Grand Prix and was set to be held at the Bahrain International Circuit on 12 April; the outbreak of the 2026 Iran war prevented the race from taking place as scheduled. Following an agreement between Formula One, the Fédération Internationale de l'Automobile (FIA), Bahrain, and Malaysia, the event was reinstated on the calendar and relocated to Sepang, retaining the Bahrain Grand Prix name. Bahrain retained control over ticket pricing and the right to receive all proceeds from the race.

Max Verstappen (Red Bull) secured his first pole position of the season. Lewis Hamilton (Ferrari) qualified second, ahead of Verstappen's teammate Isack Hadjar. Hadjar's five-place grid penalty for exceeding his allocation of power unit elements relegated him to eighth on the starting grid. This promoted championship leader Kimi Antonelli (Mercedes) to third, alongside Charles Leclerc (Ferrari) on the second row.

Heavy rain delayed the start by 40 minutes. Technical problems during the formation laps then forced the starting procedure to be suspended. The race began behind the safety car 93 minutes after the scheduled start time, with a standing start at the beginning of lap 3. Verstappen won from pole to claim his and Red Bull's first victory of the season. Antonelli finished second, ahead of Hamilton, who recovered from 18th after starting on slick tyres on the wet circuit. Championship contender George Russell (Mercedes) retired from third with a power-unit failure. The result extended Antonelli's championship lead over his teammate to 84 points.

== Background ==
The event was held at the Sepang International Circuit in Sepang across the weekend of 2–4 October. It was the 20th Formula One Grand Prix in the circuit's history. The Sepang International Circuit hosted the Malaysian Grand Prix as a round of the Formula One World Championship from 1999 to 2017. The Grand Prix was the sixteenth round of the 2026 Formula One World Championship and the 22nd running of the Bahrain Grand Prix.

In August 2025, the then youth and sports minister Hannah Yeoh said that the government had no immediate plans to restore the Malaysian Grand Prix, citing an estimated annual hosting fee of 300 million Malaysian ringgit (approx. 73 million USD) and competition for places on the Formula One calendar. She said Malaysia would nevertheless be open to a privately funded proposal.

=== Postponement and attempts to reschedule ===
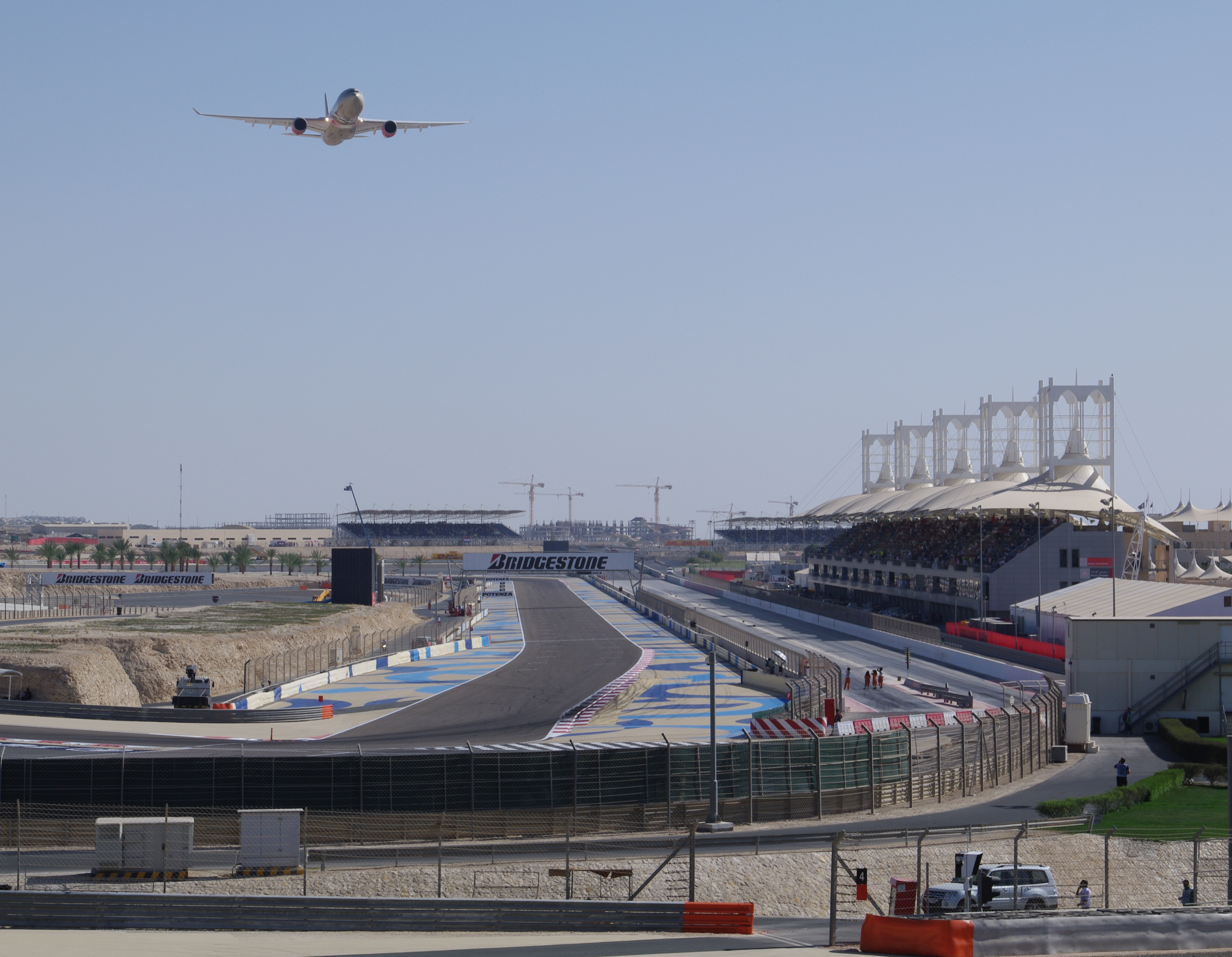
The Bahrain International Circuit, where the Grand Prix was originally scheduled to take place.

The event was originally scheduled to take place across the weekend of 10–12 April 2026 at the Bahrain International Circuit and would have been the fourth round of the championship. As of 2026, the Bahrain Grand Prix was contracted to remain on the Formula One calendar until 2036.

On 28 February 2026, the Iran war broke out following airstrikes against Iran, by the United States and Israel. In retaliation, Iran launched counterattacks targeting numerous American military bases in the Middle East, including in four countries that host Formula One: Bahrain, Saudi Arabia, Qatar and the United Arab Emirates. Shortly after the conflict began, Pirelli cancelled tyre tests, scheduled for 28 February-1 March, at the Bahrain International Circuit because of safety concerns. On 14 March, Formula One announced that the Bahrain and Saudi Arabian Grands Prix would not take place on their originally scheduled dates of 12 and 19 April.

By late July, efforts to preserve one of the two rounds had focused on the Bahrain Grand Prix, with the Sepang International Circuit among the replacement options being considered. A decision on any replacement would need to be made before the summer break following the Hungarian Grand Prix.

=== Relocation to Sepang ===
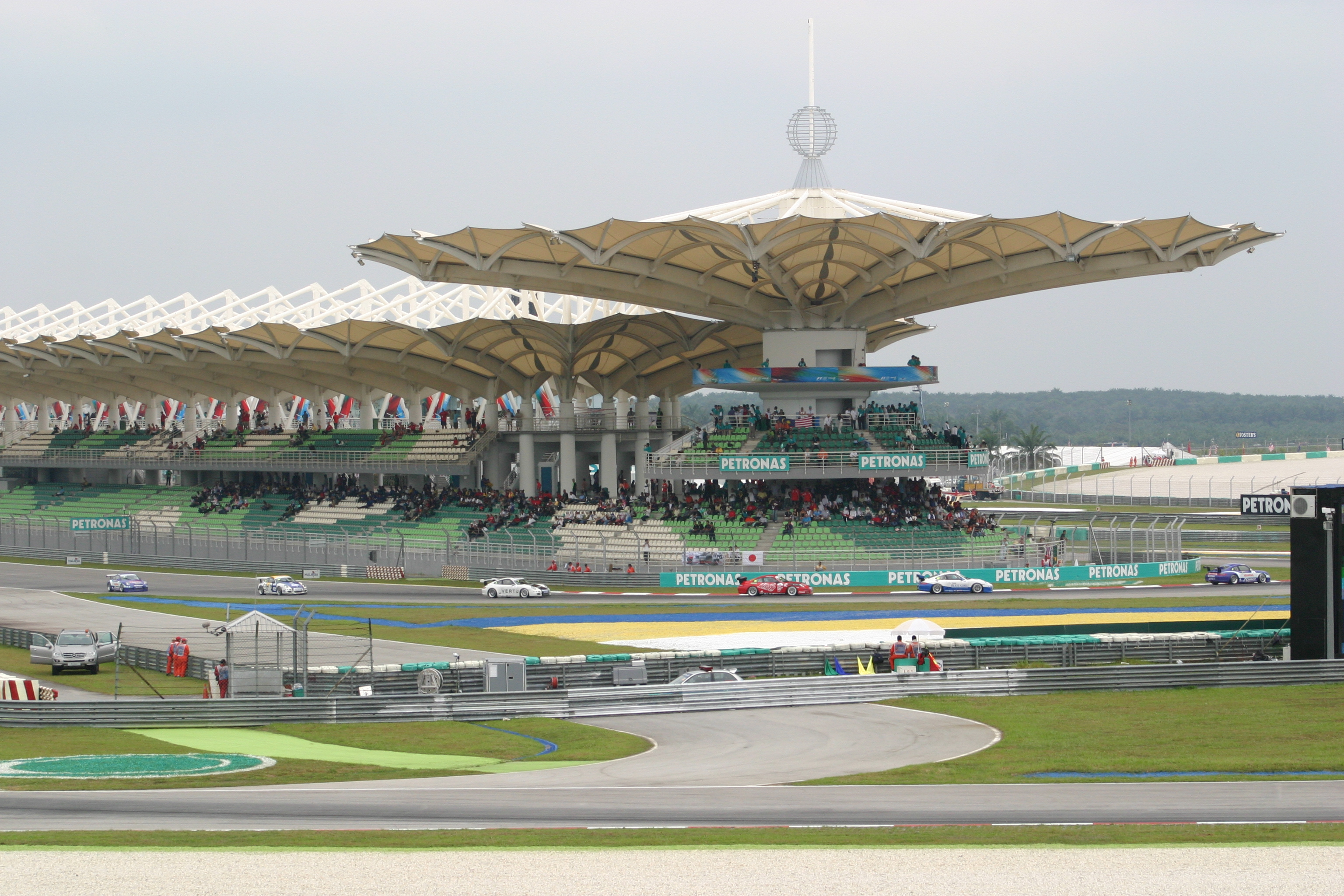
The Sepang International Circuit played host to the event.

On 24 July, the Malaysian youth and sports minister Mohammed Taufiq Johari announced that the Prime Minister Anwar Ibrahim and the Ministry of Youth and Sports had received preliminary information about the possibility of Sepang hosting the Bahrain Grand Prix. The ministry was discussing and assessing the proposal, with further developments to be announced after a decision had been finalised. Formula One had outlined the logistical requirements for staging a Grand Prix rather than presenting Malaysian authorities with a confirmed event. Although Sepang retained the FIA Grade 1 licence required for Formula One and continued to host the Malaysian motorcycle Grand Prix, organising a Formula One race at short notice would require additional work. Reuters reported that multiple replacement venues were being assessed and that no decision had been made.

On 26 July, Formula One and the FIA announced that Sepang would host the Bahrain Grand Prix from 2 to 4 October. The agreement was reached with the governments of Bahrain and Malaysia, and the remainder of the 2026 calendar was left unchanged. The reintroduction moved the 2026 scheduled to 23 rounds, with the event being the second of three consecutive race weekends alongside Azerbaijan and Singapore. Malaysian prime minister Anwar Ibrahim welcomed the agreement and said that Malaysia was ready to support Bahrain, Formula One, and the FIA in staging the event.

Reports indicated that Bahrain would cover most of the rescheduling costs, while retaining the ticket pricing rights and race proceeds. The event also retained its Bahraini organisers, with the aim of ensuring the race retained its Bahraini identity despite the change of venue. Hundreds of workers originally set to work at the Bahrain Grand Prix in Bahrain traveled to Malaysia for the event, including hospitality staff and track marshals. The race paddock was also redecorated for the event using furniture from the Bahrain International Circut and bottles of rosewater were procured for the podium ceremony following the race instead of the typical champagne, as is traditional in Bahrain.

=== Event logistics ===
The event experienced numerous logistical difficulties, particularly on Friday, the first day of the race weekend. Attendees complained that water stations were sparse, undersupplied, and understaffed, with some attendees reportedly fainting due to heat and dehydration. The transportation to and from the venue failed to meet demand, with ground shuttle and KLIA rail station queues reaching 3 hours or longer.

The reliance on Bahraini organisers and staff was apparently a contributing factor to the logistical issues. Organisers reportedly failed to anticipate that the Friday practice sessions would draw a much higher attendance in Malaysia than Bahrain, where practice attendance is lower than qualifying or the race by a larger than average margin. Additionally, both organisers and event workers were unfamiliar with the venue layout. Following a series of overnight emergency planning meetings, these issues were mitigated for the remainder of the weekend, and attendance was closer to the expected levels.

=== Championship standings before the race ===
Going into the weekend, Kimi Antonelli led the Drivers' Championship with 302 points, 66 points ahead of teammate George Russell in second and 103 ahead of Lewis Hamilton in third. Mercedes, with 538 points, led the Constructors' Championship from Ferrari and McLaren, which were second and third with 378 and 306 points, respectively.

=== Entrants ===
The drivers and teams were the same as the season entry list with no additional stand-in drivers for the race.

=== Tyre choices ===
Tyre supplier Pirelli selected its C2, C3, and C4 compounds—the middle three in its range—for the event, designating them as hard, medium, and soft, respectively.

=== Penalties ===
Franco Colapinto (Alpine) carried a five-place grid penalty for causing a collision at the previous Azerbaijan Grand Prix.

== Practice ==
Three free practice sessions were held for the event. The first free practice session was held on 2 October 2026, at 12:30 local time (UTC+8), and was topped by Max Verstappen (Red Bull) ahead of George Russell (Mercedes) and Verstappen's teammate Isack Hadjar. The second free practice session was held on the same day, at 16:00 local time, and was topped by Charles Leclerc (Ferrari) ahead of Hadjar and Lando Norris (McLaren). A virtual safety car was deployed in the closing minutes after Gabriel Bortoleto (Audi) stopped on track. The third free practice session was held on 3 October 2026, at 12:30 local time, and was topped by Kimi Antonelli (Mercedes) ahead of Verstappen and Hadjar. The session was briefly red-flagged due to debris on track from the car of Oliver Bearman (Haas).

== Qualifying ==
Qualifying was held on 3 October 2026, at 16:00 local time (UTC+8), and determined the starting grid order for the race.

=== Qualifying report ===
In the first segment of qualifying (Q1), Esteban Ocon and Oliver Bearman (Haas) left the pits early as the team anticipated that they would struggle to progress and wanted the option to have three attempts. Ferrari and Audi initially opted for medium tyres, while the remaining teams used softs. Kimi Antonelli (Mercedes) set the early pace before Max Verstappen (Red Bull) moved ahead, with Lewis Hamilton (Ferrari) and teammate Charles Leclerc taking second and third on mediums. Bearman's second attempt was compromised by a lock-up at turn 1. During the closing runs, Pierre Gasly (Alpine) gave teammate Franco Colapinto a tow, while Gabriel Bortoleto (Audi) moved into eighth after setting the fastest opening sector. Audi switched to soft tyres for its final attempts, but Bortoleto's teammate Nico Hülkenberg was unable to progress. Hülkenberg and Alexander Albon (Williams) both made mistakes at the penultimate corner on their final laps. Hülkenberg was eliminated in 17th, behind Arvid Lindblad (Racing Bulls), followed by Bearman, Ocon, Albon and the Cadillac drivers Valtteri Bottas and Sergio Pérez. Ocon, the first driver to take the chequered flag, later questioned the timing of his final run. Lance Stroll (Aston Martin) reached Q2 for the first time that season, joining teammate Fernando Alonso.

Verstappen set the pace in the second segment (Q2), with Leclerc initially his closest challenger as Ferrari switched to soft tyres. Antonelli's opening lap was deleted for exceeding track limits at turn 6, forcing him to use another set of new softs to secure his progression. His subsequent effort placed him second, behind Verstappen and ahead of Leclerc. Verstappen and Alonso both received black-and-white warning flags for driving unnecessarily slowly. With a grid penalty already consigning him to the back, Lindblad gave teammate Liam Lawson a tow along the back straight. Lawson briefly occupied the final Q3 place, before Bortoleto displaced him on his last attempt. Lawson was eliminated in 11th, followed by Alonso, Carlos Sainz Jr. (Williams), Stroll, Colapinto and Lindblad; the latter two did not record a time in Q2. Alonso's 12th place was his best qualifying result of the season. Colapinto's combined 15-place grid penalty—five places for causing a collision at the Azerbaijan Grand Prix and ten for exceeding his allocation of power unit elements—left him 21st on the starting grid, ahead of Lindblad, who received a 30-place penalty for power unit changes.

In the final segment (Q3), George Russell (Mercedes) set the initial benchmark before Verstappen and teammate Isack Hadjar took the top two positions on their opening attempts. Having used an additional set of tyres in Q2, Antonelli had only one set of new softs available and made his run between his rivals' two attempts, briefly moving into third. Verstappen improved on his final attempt by setting the fastest final sector, despite failing to improve through the first two sectors. Hamilton's final lap split the Red Bulls, securing second ahead of Hadjar, who matched his career-best qualifying position in third. Verstappen was fastest in all three segments, securing his first pole position of the season and the 49th of his career. It was the first pole of 2026 for a non-Mercedes engine and the first for Red Bull Ford as an engine supplier. Antonelli qualified fourth ahead of Leclerc, with Lando Norris and Oscar Piastri (McLaren) sixth and seventh; Russell, Gasly and Bortoleto completed the top ten. Hadjar's five-place grid penalty for taking a seventh internal combustion engine relegated him to eighth, promoting Antonelli, Leclerc, Norris, Piastri and Russell by one position each.

=== Qualifying classification ===
| Pos. | No. | Driver | Constructor | Qualifying times | | | Final grid |
| Pos. | No. | Driver | Constructor | Q1 | Q2 | Q3 | Final grid |
|---|---|---|---|---|---|---|---|
| 1 | 3 | (Netherlands) Max Verstappen | Red Bull Racing-Red Bull Ford | 1:36.477 | 1:35.696 | 1:35.130 | 1 |
| 2 | 44 | (United Kingdom) Lewis Hamilton | Ferrari | 1:36.595 | 1:36.032 | 1:35.428 | 2 |
| 3 | 6 | (France) Isack Hadjar | Red Bull Racing-Red Bull Ford | 1:36.898 | 1:36.192 | 1:35.558 | 8^{a} |
| 4 | 12 | (Italy) Kimi Antonelli | Mercedes | 1:37.041 | 1:35.959 | 1:35.631 | 3 |
| 5 | 16 | (Monaco) Charles Leclerc | Ferrari | 1:36.730 | 1:35.970 | 1:35.666 | 4 |
| 6 | 1 | (United Kingdom) Lando Norris | McLaren-Mercedes | 1:37.092 | 1:36.173 | 1:35.757 | 5 |
| 7 | 81 | (Australia) Oscar Piastri | McLaren-Mercedes | 1:36.852 | 1:36.020 | 1:35.762 | 6 |
| 8 | 63 | (United Kingdom) George Russell | Mercedes | 1:37.264 | 1:36.245 | 1:35.871 | 7 |
| 9 | 10 | (France) Pierre Gasly | Alpine-Mercedes | 1:37.174 | 1:36.410 | 1:37.210 | 9 |
| 10 | 5 | (Brazil) Gabriel Bortoleto | Audi | 1:37.106 | 1:36.814 | 1:37.673 | 10 |
| 11 | 30 | (New Zealand) Liam Lawson | Racing Bulls-Red Bull Ford | 1:37.332 | 1:37.023 | N/A | 11 |
| 12 | 14 | (Spain) Fernando Alonso | Aston Martin Aramco-Honda | 1:37.721 | 1:37.220 | N/A | 12 |
| 13 | 55 | (Spain) Carlos Sainz Jr. | Atlassian Williams-Mercedes | 1:37.651 | 1:37.527 | N/A | 13 |
| 14 | 18 | (Canada) Lance Stroll | Aston Martin Aramco-Honda | 1:37.729 | 1:37.566 | N/A | 14 |
| 15 | 43 | (Argentina) Franco Colapinto | Alpine-Mercedes | 1:37.179 | No time | N/A | 21^{b} |
| 16 | 41 | (United Kingdom) Arvid Lindblad | Racing Bulls-Red Bull Ford | 1:37.883 | No time | N/A | 22^{c} |
| 17 | 27 | (Germany) Nico Hülkenberg | Audi | 1:37.970 | N/A | N/A | 15 |
| 18 | 87 | (United Kingdom) Oliver Bearman | Haas-Ferrari | 1:37.980 | N/A | N/A | 16 |
| 19 | 31 | (France) Esteban Ocon | Haas-Ferrari | 1:38.233 | N/A | N/A | 17 |
| 20 | 23 | (Thailand) Alexander Albon | Atlassian Williams-Mercedes | 1:38.600 | N/A | N/A | 18 |
| 21 | 77 | (Finland) Valtteri Bottas | Cadillac-Ferrari | 1:38.611 | N/A | N/A | 19 |
| 22 | 11 | (Mexico) Sergio Pérez | Cadillac-Ferrari | 1:38.933 | N/A | N/A | 20 |
107% time: 1:43.230

Notes

- ^a – Isack Hadjar received a five-place grid penalty for exceeding his quota of power unit elements.
- ^b – Franco Colapinto received a five-place grid penalty for causing a collision at the previous Azerbaijan Grand Prix. He also received a 10-place grid penalty for exceeding his quota of power unit elements.
- ^c – Arvid Lindblad received a 30-place grid penalty for exceeding his quota of power unit elements.

== Race ==
=== Race report ===
The race was held on 4 October. Heavy rain before the scheduled 15:00 start left standing water on the circuit and delayed the starting procedure. At 15:40, the field set off on formation laps behind the safety car, with all drivers having selected intermediate-wet tyres. Isack Hadjar (Red Bull) slid into the gravel at turn 3 but rejoined, while several cars experienced difficulty accelerating and were stalling on track. Max Verstappen (Red Bull) reported a loss of throttle response, and Lewis Hamilton (Ferrari) briefly stopped on the circuit; Ferrari attributed Hamilton's problem to software and restored power with a reset.

The starting procedure was suspended under the red flag after two formation laps, and the cars returned to the pit lane without a racing start having taken place. This was the first rain-affected race under the new power unit regulations. Although the technical problems had disrupted the running order, the FIA confirmed that the original grid positions would be restored. During the interruption, Mercedes deputy team principal Bradley Lord said that the FIA had supplied teams with revised software parameters. The field left the pit lane behind the safety car at 16:33, 93 minutes after the scheduled start.

By then, the drying circuit prompted different tyre choices: nine drivers selected intermediates, while the remaining thirteen chose slicks, including both Ferraris on softs and both McLarens on mediums. Pierre Gasly (Alpine), running on slick tyres, spun during the opening lap behind the safety car. Sergio Pérez (Cadillac) stopped after the first lap, while Oscar Piastri (McLaren), Gabriel Bortoleto and Nico Hülkenberg (both Audi), Lance Stroll (Aston Martin) stopped after the second to change to intermediates, with Sergio Pérez also stopping again on the second consecutive lap. Unlike the earlier aborted formation laps, these laps counted towards the race, and a standing start followed at the end of lap 2.

At the standing start, Kimi Antonelli and George Russell (Mercedes) passed Verstappen to take first and second, while Verstappen defended from Liam Lawson (Racing Bulls) to retain third. The drivers who remained on slicks lost ground, with Hamilton falling as low as 18th and more than a minute behind the leaders. Charles Leclerc (Ferrari) damaged his front wing in contact with Hülkenberg and pitted for a replacement and intermediates. Hamilton, chose to continue on his original soft tyres despite the team suggesting a pit stop. Verstappen passed Russell at turn 4 on lap 6, while Hadjar overtook Lawson at the final corner to move into fourth.

As conditions improved, Valtteri Bottas (Cadillac) spun into the gravel, prompting a safety car deployment. Most drivers used the interruption to change tyres, with the Mercedes pair selecting mediums, the Red Bulls softs and Lawson hards. Hamilton stayed out on his original softs, and the safety car eliminated much of the time he had lost during the opening laps. Racing resumed on lap 13, when Verstappen challenged Antonelli around the outside of turn 1 and completed the pass through turn 2; Russell then passed his teammate at turn 5. Further back, Bortoleto collided with Carlos Sainz Jr. (Williams) at turn 2, sending Sainz into a spin; the stewards held Bortoleto responsible and imposed a ten-second penalty.

Antonelli retook second from Russell at turn 4 on lap 21. He subsequently ran wide at the final corner and struck a bollard while rejoining, losing further time to Verstappen. Hamilton meanwhile advanced from 16th to fifth within ten laps of the restart, despite continuing on the tyres with which he had started. His recovery included passes on Piastri, Arvid Lindblad (Racing Bulls), Esteban Ocon (Haas) and Lawson. Leclerc also recovered from his early stop to reach the points positions.

The victory was Verstappen's first of the season. He became the first winner at the Sepang circuit since his previous victory there at the 2017 Malaysian Grand Prix.

Hamilton closed on Hadjar, and both stopped at the end of lap 31, Hamilton making his first tyre change of the race. Hamilton switched to mediums, while Hadjar took another set of softs and retained fourth; Hamilton subsequently struggled to find a way past after closing the gap. Russell stopped at the end of lap 32, followed by Verstappen and Antonelli one lap later. Verstappen retained the lead throughout and had built an advantage of more than ten seconds. Leclerc used an earlier stop to move ahead of both McLarens. Fernando Alonso (Aston Martin) overtook Lindblad at turn 2 to move into the points positions.

On lap 43, Alexander Albon (Williams) stopped with a technical problem, triggering a virtual safety car. Verstappen, Hamilton and Leclerc pitted at the end of that lap, temporarily handing the lead to Antonelli; Antonelli, Russell and Hadjar stopped on the following lap, restoring Verstappen to first. Difficulties recovering Albon's car led to a full safety car deployment, bringing the field together again. The McLarens, Lawson and Alonso stopped at the end of lap 45. Ocon continued without another tyre change, leaving him on older tyres for the restart.

Russell retired from third place with a power unit failure while the field remained behind the safety car. During the same safety car period, Lando Norris (McLaren) lost positions after struggling to identify the slowing down of the field as Russell retired, taking avoiding action behind Piastri and running through the gravel at turn 1, dropping from eighth to eleventh. The safety car withdrew at the end of lap 51, leaving four laps of racing, with Verstappen leading Antonelli, Hadjar and Hamilton. Hamilton passed Hadjar at turn 1 on lap 53 to take third, and Leclerc overtook Hadjar at the same corner on the following lap.

After 55 laps, Verstappen finished ahead of Antonelli, with Hamilton third, Leclerc fourth and Hadjar fifth. Piastri and Lawson took sixth and seventh, while Alonso finished eighth for his best result of the season. Norris recovered to ninth, and Lindblad passed Hülkenberg on the final lap to secure tenth, completing a double points finish for Racing Bulls. Stroll finished twelfth, his best result of the season, while both Alpines and both Haas cars finished outside the points. Russell was classified twentieth after completing 49 laps; Albon and Bottas were the other retirements.

The stewards summoned Albon over alleged erratic driving at the pit entry and Hülkenberg over an alleged unsafe release. Norris was also summoned regarding his avoiding action under the safety car, including alleged erratic driving, an unsafe rejoin and overtaking behind the safety car. The victory was Verstappen's first of the season and the 72nd of his Formula One career, and marked the first win for Red Bull Ford as an engine supplier. It was the first victory for a Ford-powered car since the 2003 Brazilian Grand Prix. Verstappen also set the fastest lap. Antonelli extended his championship lead over Russell from 66 to 84 points with seven rounds remaining.

==== Post-race reactions and FIA review ====
Several drivers criticised the disruption to the race and the complexity of the 2026 power units. George Russell (Mercedes) argued that their complexity increased the potential for failures and expressed disappointment at the experience offered to spectators by the delays and prolonged safety car periods. Carlos Sainz Jr. (Williams) questioned the direction taken by the regulations, while Lando Norris (McLaren) criticised the reliance on electronic systems. Sergio Pérez (Cadillac) described the situation as unacceptable for the sport. Oscar Piastri (McLaren), cautioned against assigning blame before the cause had been established.

In a post-race statement, the FIA attributed the loss of power to a combination of low engine speeds, low grip, wet-weather energy management settings and the circuit's sector configuration. It said its technical department had distributed a software update to all teams during the delay, removing the energy restriction in the affected sectors so that adjustments could be made before the start. The FIA stated that the problem had not been detected during testing or the reconnaissance laps and announced that it would conduct a review with the teams and power unit manufacturers.

=== Race classification ===
| Pos. | No. | Driver | Constructor | Laps | Time/Retired | Grid | Points |
|---|---|---|---|---|---|---|---|
| 1 | 3 | (Netherlands) Max Verstappen | Red Bull Racing-Red Bull Ford | 55 | 1:47:14.808 | 1 | 25 |
| 2 | 12 | (Italy) Kimi Antonelli | Mercedes | 55 | +2.307 | 3 | 18 |
| 3 | 44 | (United Kingdom) Lewis Hamilton | Ferrari | 55 | +4.919 | 2 | 15 |
| 4 | 16 | (Monaco) Charles Leclerc | Ferrari | 55 | +7.258 | 4 | 12 |
| 5 | 6 | (France) Isack Hadjar | Red Bull Racing-Red Bull Ford | 55 | +8.571 | 8 | 10 |
| 6 | 81 | (Australia) Oscar Piastri | McLaren-Mercedes | 55 | +9.454 | 6 | 8 |
| 7 | 30 | (New Zealand) Liam Lawson | Racing Bulls-Red Bull Ford | 55 | +12.753 | 11 | 6 |
| 8 | 14 | (Spain) Fernando Alonso | Aston Martin Aramco-Honda | 55 | +13.372 | 12 | 4 |
| 9 | 1 | (United Kingdom) Lando Norris | McLaren-Mercedes | 55 | +13.993 | 5 | 2 |
| 10 | 41 | (United Kingdom) Arvid Lindblad | Racing Bulls-Red Bull Ford | 55 | +15.928 | 22 | 1 |
| 11 | 27 | (Germany) Nico Hülkenberg | Audi | 55 | +17.404 | 15 | |
| 12 | 18 | (Canada) Lance Stroll | Aston Martin Aramco-Honda | 55 | +18.052 | 14 | |
| 13 | 43 | (Argentina) Franco Colapinto | Alpine-Mercedes | 55 | +18.997 | 21 | |
| 14 | 87 | (United Kingdom) Oliver Bearman | Haas-Ferrari | 55 | +22.305 | 16 | |
| 15 | 31 | (France) Esteban Ocon | Haas-Ferrari | 55 | +22.532 | 17 | |
| 16 | 10 | (France) Pierre Gasly | Alpine-Mercedes | 55 | +23.315 | 9 | |
| 17 | 55 | (Spain) Carlos Sainz Jr. | Atlassian Williams-Mercedes | 55 | +25.431 | 13 | |
| 18 | 5 | (Brazil) Gabriel Bortoleto | Audi | 55 | +28.233 | 10 | |
| 19 | 11 | (Mexico) Sergio Pérez | Cadillac-Ferrari | 55 | +29.310 | 20 | |
| 20^{a} | 63 | (United Kingdom) George Russell | Mercedes | 49 | Power loss | 7 | |
| Ret | 23 | (Thailand) Alexander Albon | Atlassian Williams-Mercedes | 41 | Gearbox | 18 | |
| Ret | 77 | (Finland) Valtteri Bottas | Cadillac-Ferrari | 7 | Spun off | 19 | |

Notes

- ^a – George Russell was classified as he completed more than 90% of the race distance.

== Championship standings after the race ==
Drivers' Championship standings

| | Pos. | Driver | Points |
|---|---|---|---|
| | 1 | (Italy) **Kimi Antonelli*** | 320 |
| | 2 | (United Kingdom) **George Russell*** | 236 |
| | 3 | (United Kingdom) **Lewis Hamilton*** | 214 |
| 1 | 4 | (Monaco) **Charles Leclerc*** | 191 |
| 1 | 5 | (United Kingdom) **Lando Norris*** | 188 |

Constructors' Championship standings

| Pos. | Constructor | Points |
|---|---|---|
| 1 | (Germany) **Mercedes*** | 556 |
| 2 | (Italy) **Ferrari*** | 405 |
| 3 | (United Kingdom) **McLaren-Mercedes*** | 316 |
| 4 | (Austria) **Red Bull Racing-Red Bull Ford*** | 298 |
| 5 | (Italy) Racing Bulls-Red Bull Ford | 90 |

- Note: Only the top five positions are included for both sets of standings.
- Note: Competitors in bold and marked with an asterisk still had a mathematical chance of becoming World Champion.

== See also ==
- 2011 Bahrain Grand Prix, which was cancelled due to the Arab Spring in Bahrain
- 2020 Bahrain Grand Prix, which was postponed until November due to the outbreak of the COVID-19 pandemic

| Previous race: 2026 Azerbaijan Grand Prix | FIA Formula One World Championship; 2026 season | Next race: 2026 Singapore Grand Prix |
| Previous race: 2025 Bahrain Grand Prix; Previous race at the Sepang International Circuit: 2017 Malaysian Grand Prix | Bahrain Grand Prix | Next race: 2027 Bahrain Grand Prix |
