= 2017 Malaysian Grand Prix =

2017 Formula 1 race

Race 15 of 20 in the 2017 Formula One World Championship
← Previous race	Next race →
- Layout of the Sepang International Circuit

Race details
- Date: 1 October 2017
- Official name: 2017 Formula 1 Petronas Malaysia Grand Prix
- Location: Sepang International Circuit, Sepang, Selangor, Malaysia
- Course: Permanent racing facility
- Course length: 5.543 km (3.444 miles)
- Distance: 56 laps, 310.408 km (192.879 miles)
- Weather: Cloudy
- Attendance: 110,604

Pole position
Driver	(United Kingdom) Lewis Hamilton	Mercedes
- Time: 1:30.076

Fastest lap
Driver	(Germany) Sebastian Vettel	Ferrari
- Time: 1:34.080 on lap 41 (lap record)

Podium
First	(Netherlands) Max Verstappen	Red Bull Racing-TAG Heuer
Second	(United Kingdom) Lewis Hamilton	Mercedes
Third	(Australia) Daniel Ricciardo	Red Bull Racing-TAG Heuer

The 2017 Malaysian Grand Prix (formally known as the 2017 Formula 1 Petronas Malaysia Grand Prix) was a Formula One motor race that was held on 1 October 2017 at the Sepang International Circuit in Selangor, Malaysia. The race marked the 37th running of the Malaysian Grand Prix, and the 19th time that the race had been run as a World Championship event, since the championship's inception in 1950, all World Championship events having been held at the Sepang International Circuit. This was also the last Malaysian Grand Prix, as the race had not been contracted for the 2018 season and beyond.

Mercedes driver Lewis Hamilton entered the round with a 28-point lead over Ferrari's Sebastian Vettel in the World Drivers' Championship. Hamilton's teammate Valtteri Bottas was third, a further 23 points behind. In the World Constructors' Championship, Mercedes held a lead of 102 points over Ferrari, with Red Bull Racing a further 143 points behind in third place.

== Report ==
=== Background ===
==== Driver changes ====
Reigning GP2 Series champion Pierre Gasly made his Formula One debut, replacing Daniil Kvyat at Toro Rosso. The first free practice session saw several substitute drivers take part, including Sergey Sirotkin filling in for Nico Hülkenberg at Renault, Charles Leclerc replacing Marcus Ericsson at Sauber, Antonio Giovinazzi replacing Kevin Magnussen at Haas, and Sean Gelael taking the place of Carlos Sainz Jr. at Toro Rosso.

=== Free practice ===
The second free practice was red-flagged after Grosjean crashed heavily at Turn 14. Valtteri Bottas and Kimi Räikkönen dislodged a drain cover embedded in the apex of Turn 13. Grosjean, the next driver through, struck the cover which sliced into his rear wheel. This caused the rear tyre to immediately deflate as Grosjean put load onto the steering wheel, causing him to spin into the barrier on the outside of Turn 14. The third practice session was concluded with Kimi Räikkönen fastest but his teammate Sebastian Vettel had an engine problem that required a replacement.

=== Qualifying ===
Sebastian Vettel failed to set a time in Q1 as his replacement engine did not run properly meaning that he would start last on the grid. Championship leader Lewis Hamilton took pole position with a time of 1:30.076, ahead of Kimi Räikkönen and Max Verstappen.

=== Race ===
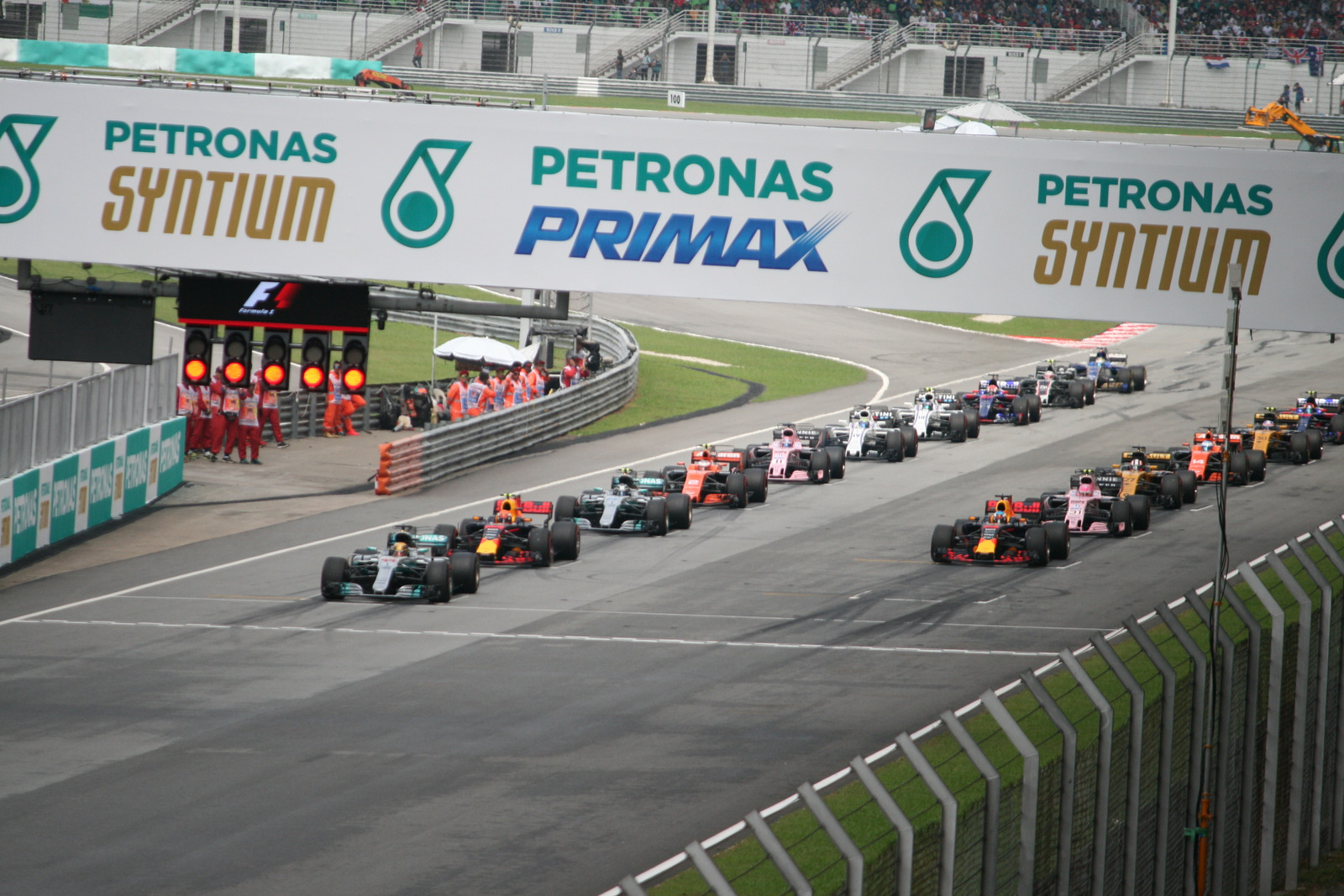
Starting grid of the race

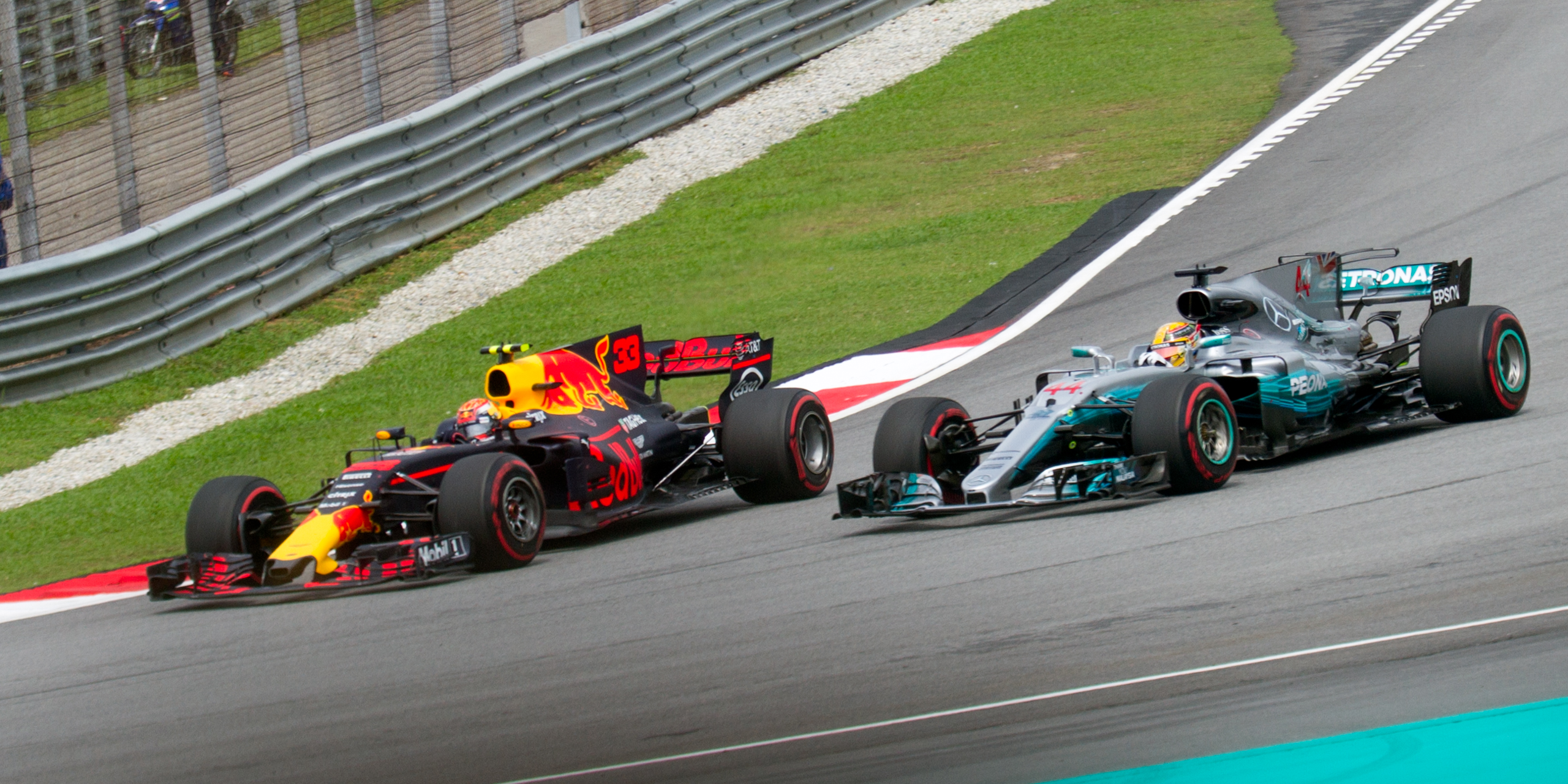
Verstappen overtakes Hamilton for the lead

Kimi Räikkönen pulled off the grid due to a power unit issue. Hamilton got off well with Ricciardo, Bottas and Verstappen behind. Verstappen overtook Hamilton for the lead on lap 4, and led until lap 28 when he pitted, leaving Ricciardo in the lead. Ricciardo then also pitted and Verstappen retook the lead. Coming into the last laps, Hamilton tried fighting back but Verstappen won comfortably to take his second win in his career, a year after his previous at the 2016 Spanish Grand Prix.

Meanwhile, Vettel came back from last to 4th through the field, almost overtaking Ricciardo in third. After the race Lance Stroll and Vettel collided on the cooldown lap, wrapping Vettel's left-rear tyre over the right side of the car. Pascal Wehrlein gave him a ride back to the paddock after the crash.

== Classification ==
=== Qualifying ===
Pos.	Car no.	Driver	Constructor	Qualifying times			Final grid
Pos.	Car no.	Driver	Constructor	Q1	Q2	Q3	Final grid
1	44	(United Kingdom) Lewis Hamilton	Mercedes	1:31.605	1:30.977	1:30.076	1
2	7	(Finland) Kimi Räikkönen	Ferrari	1:32.259	1:30.926	1:30.121	2
3	33	(Netherlands) Max Verstappen	Red Bull Racing-TAG Heuer	1:31.920	1:30.931	1:30.541	3
4	3	(Australia) Daniel Ricciardo	Red Bull Racing-TAG Heuer	1:32.416	1:31.061	1:30.595	4
5	77	(Finland) Valtteri Bottas	Mercedes	1:32.254	1:30.803	1:30.758	5
6	31	(France) Esteban Ocon	Force India-Mercedes	1:32.527	1:31.651	1:31.478	6
7	2	(Belgium) Stoffel Vandoorne	McLaren-Honda	1:32.838	1:31.848	1:31.582	7
8	27	(Germany) Nico Hülkenberg	Renault	1:32.586	1:31.778	1:31.607	8
9	11	(Mexico) Sergio Pérez	Force India-Mercedes	1:32.768	1:31.484	1:31.658	9
10	14	(Spain) Fernando Alonso	McLaren-Honda	1:33.049	1:32.010	1:31.704	10
11	19	(Brazil) Felipe Massa	Williams-Mercedes	1:32.267	1:32.034		11
12	30	(United Kingdom) Jolyon Palmer	Renault	1:32.576	1:32.100		12
13	18	(Canada) Lance Stroll	Williams-Mercedes	1:33.000	1:32.307		13
14	55	(Spain) Carlos Sainz Jr.	Toro Rosso	1:32.650	1:32.402		14
15	10	(France) Pierre Gasly	Toro Rosso	1:32.547	1:32.558		15
16	8	(France) Romain Grosjean	Haas-Ferrari	1:33.308			16
17	20	(Denmark) Kevin Magnussen	Haas-Ferrari	1:33.434			17
18	94	(Germany) Pascal Wehrlein	Sauber-Ferrari	1:33.483			18
19	9	(Sweden) Marcus Ericsson	Sauber-Ferrari	1:33.970			19
107% time: 1:38.017
—	5	(Germany) Sebastian Vettel	Ferrari	No time			20^{1}

Notes

- ^1 – Sebastian Vettel failed to set a time within the 107% requirement, but received permission from the stewards to start the race; he also received a 20-place grid penalty for exceeding his quota of power unit components.

=== Race ===
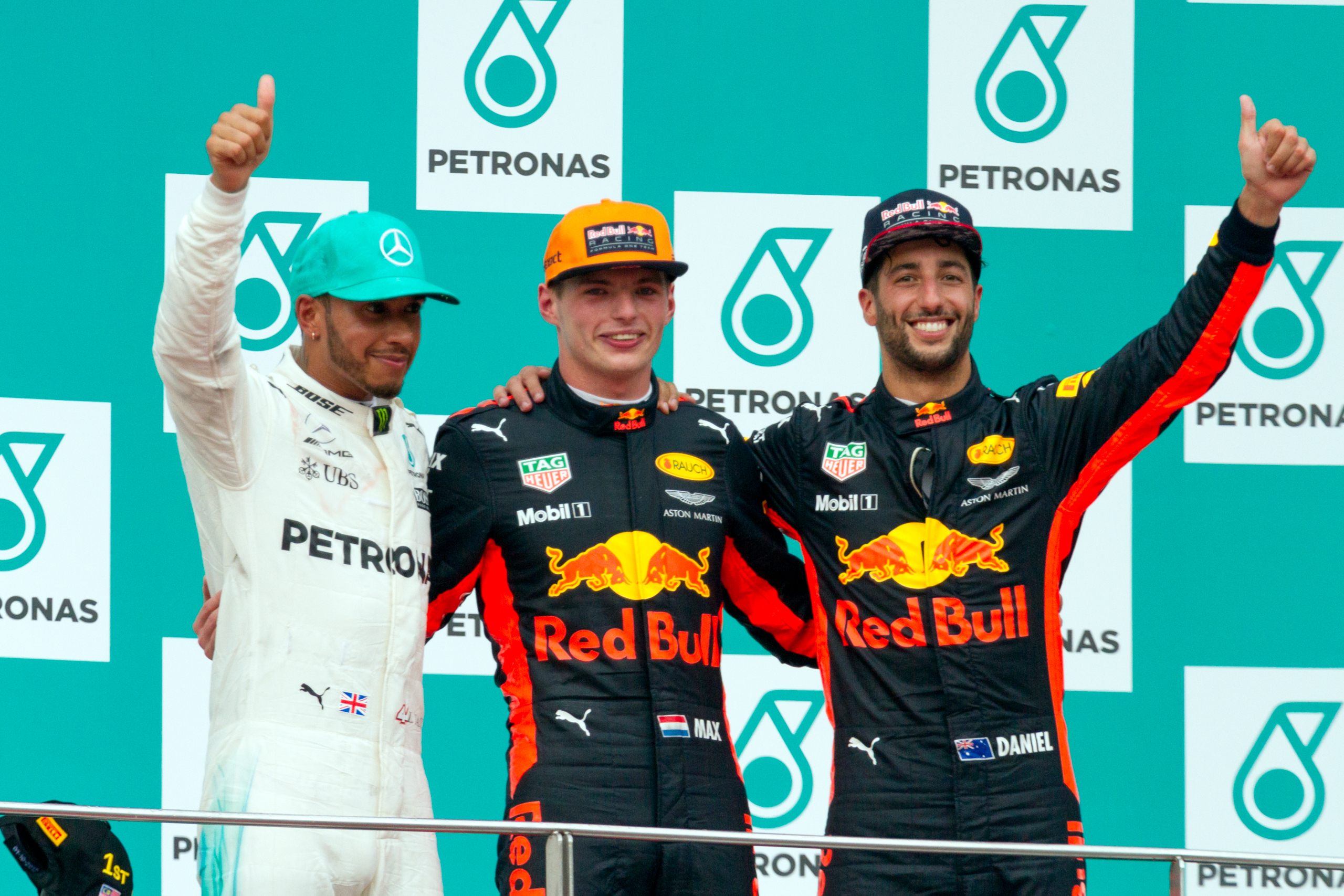
Podium (L-R) Hamilton, Verstappen and Ricciardo

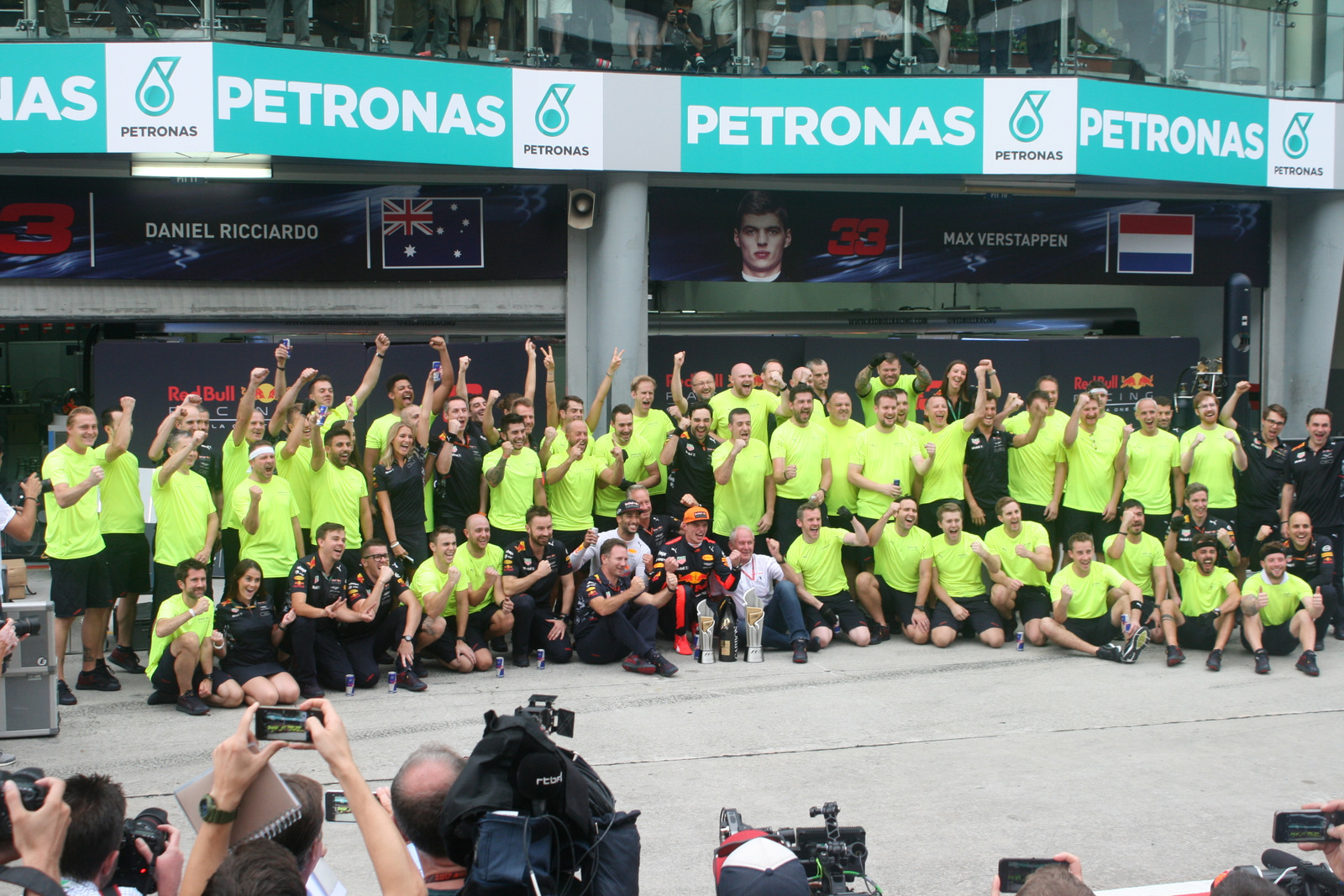
Red Bull celebrates the race win

Pos.	No.	Driver	Constructor	Laps	Time/Retired	Grid	Points
1	33	(Netherlands) Max Verstappen	Red Bull Racing-TAG Heuer	56	1:30:01.290	3	25
2	44	(United Kingdom) Lewis Hamilton	Mercedes	56	+12.770	1	18
3	3	(Australia) Daniel Ricciardo	Red Bull Racing-TAG Heuer	56	+22.519	4	15
4	5	(Germany) Sebastian Vettel	Ferrari	56	+37.362	20	12
5	77	(Finland) Valtteri Bottas	Mercedes	56	+56.021	5	10
6	11	(Mexico) Sergio Pérez	Force India-Mercedes	56	+1:18.630	9	8
7	2	(Belgium) Stoffel Vandoorne	McLaren-Honda	55	+1 Lap	7	6
8	18	(Canada) Lance Stroll	Williams-Mercedes	55	+1 Lap	13	4
9	19	(Brazil) Felipe Massa	Williams-Mercedes	55	+1 Lap	11	2
10	31	(France) Esteban Ocon	Force India-Mercedes	55	+1 Lap	6	1
11	14	(Spain) Fernando Alonso	McLaren-Honda	55	+1 Lap	10	
12	20	(Denmark) Kevin Magnussen	Haas-Ferrari	55	+1 Lap	17	
13	8	(France) Romain Grosjean	Haas-Ferrari	55	+1 Lap	16	
14	10	(France) Pierre Gasly	Toro Rosso	55	+1 Lap	15	
15	30	(United Kingdom) Jolyon Palmer	Renault	55	+1 Lap	12	
16	27	(Germany) Nico Hülkenberg	Renault	55	+1 Lap	8	
17	94	(Germany) Pascal Wehrlein	Sauber-Ferrari	55	+1 Lap	18	
18	9	(Sweden) Marcus Ericsson	Sauber-Ferrari	54	+2 Laps	19	
Ret	55	(Spain) Carlos Sainz Jr.	Toro Rosso	29	Engine	14	
DNS	7	(Finland) Kimi Räikkönen	Ferrari	0	Battery	—^{1}	

Notes

- ^1 – Kimi Räikkönen did not line up on the grid as a result of a power unit issue.

== Championship standings after the race ==
Drivers' Championship standings

Pos.	Driver	Points
1	(United Kingdom) Lewis Hamilton*	281
2	(Germany) Sebastian Vettel*	247
3	(Finland) Valtteri Bottas*	222
4	(Australia) Daniel Ricciardo*	177
5	(Finland) Kimi Räikkönen	138

Constructors' Championship standings

Pos.	Constructor	Points
1	(Germany) Mercedes*	503
2	(Italy) Ferrari*	385
3	(Austria) Red Bull Racing-TAG Heuer*	270
4	Force India-Mercedes	133
5	(United Kingdom) Williams-Mercedes	65

- Note: Only the top five positions are included for the sets of standings.
- Bold text and an asterisk indicates competitors who still had a theoretical chance of becoming World Champion.

Previous race: 2017 Singapore Grand Prix	FIA Formula One World Championship; 2017 season	Next race: 2017 Japanese Grand Prix
Previous race: 2016 Malaysian Grand Prix	Malaysian Grand Prix	Next race: N/A; Next race at the Sepang International Circuit: 2026 Bahrain Grand Prix
