= Daniil Kvyat =

Russian racing driver (born 1994)

- Даниил Квят
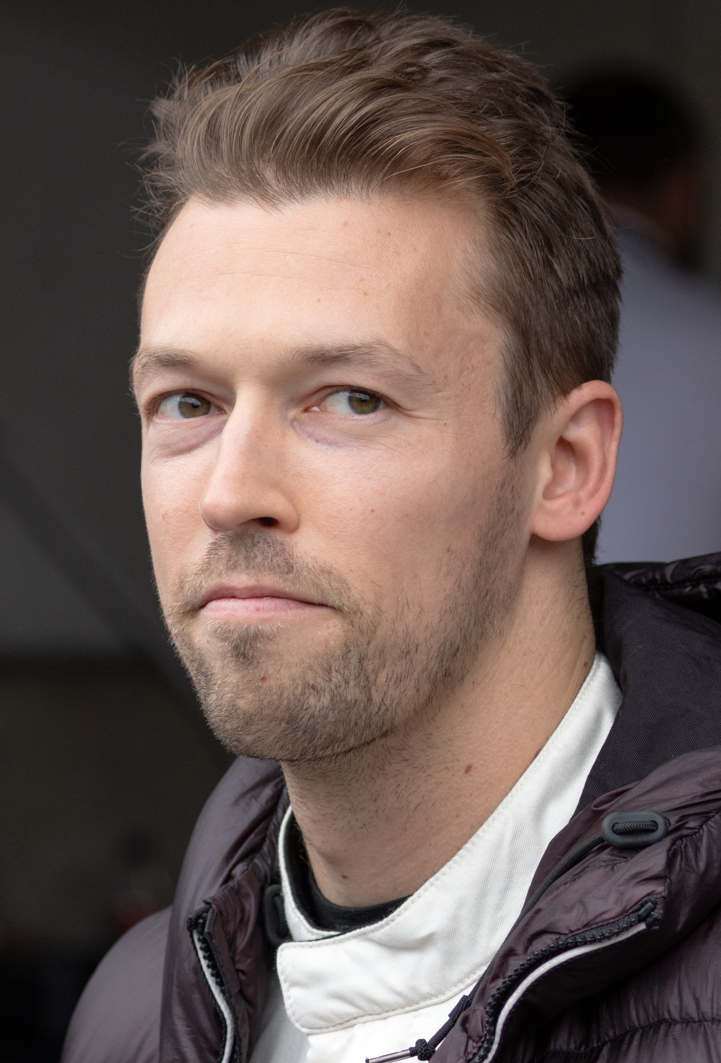
- Kvyat in 2024
- Born: Daniil Vyacheslavovich Kvyat; 26 April 1994 (age 32); Ufa, Bashkortostan, Russia
- Partners: Kelly Piquet (2017–2019)
- Children: 1
- Nationality: (Russia) Russian

Super GT career
- Debut season: 2026
- Current team: JLOC
- Categorisation: FIA Platinum
- Car number: 88
- Starts: 8
- Championships: 0
- Wins: 1
- Podiums: 2
- Poles: 1
- Fastest laps: 0
- Best finish: 4th in 2025 (GTP)

Formula One World Championship career
- Nationality: (Russia) Russian
- Active years: 2014–2017, 2019–2020
- Team(s): Toro Rosso, Red Bull, AlphaTauri
- Car number: 26
- Entries: 112 (110 starts)
- Championships: 0
- Wins: 0
- Podiums: 3
- Career points: 202
- Pole positions: 0
- Fastest laps: 1
- First entry: 2014 Australian Grand Prix
- Last entry: 2020 Abu Dhabi Grand Prix

24 Hours of Le Mans career
- Years: 2023–2024
- Teams: Prema, Lamborghini
- Best finish: 10th (2024)
- Class wins: 0

Previous series
- 2023–2024; 2013; 2013; 2012; 2010–2012; 2011; 2011; 2010; 2010: FIA WEC; GP3 Series; FIA F3 European; Formula Renault 2.0 Alps; Formula Renault Eurocup; Formula Renault NEC; Toyota Racing Series; Formula BMW Europe; Formula BMW Pacific

Championship titles
- 2013; 2012: GP3 Series; Formula Renault 2.0 Alps

Awards
- 2014; 2014: FIA Rookie of the Year; Autosport Rookie of the Year
- Website: en.kvyat.com

Daniil Vyacheslavovich Kvyat (Russian: Даниил Вячесла́вович Квят, IPA: [dənʲɪˈil vʲɪtɕɪˈslavəvʲɪtɕ ˈkvʲat]; born 26 April 1994) is a Russian racing driver who competes in Super GT for JLOC. Kvyat competed in Formula One from 2014 to 2020.

Born in Ufa and raised in Moscow, Kvyat began competitive kart racing aged 10, before moving to Italy in 2007 to pursue a professional career. After winning several international karting titles, Kvyat progressed to junior formulae in 2010. He claimed 23 victories in Formula Renault 2.0, finishing runner-up to Stoffel Vandoorne in the Eurocup and winning the Alps Series, both in 2012 with Koiranen. He then won the GP3 Series in his rookie season with Arden. A member of the Red Bull Junior Team since 2010, Kvyat signed with Toro Rosso in 2014, making his Formula One debut at the Australian Grand Prix, finishing ninth to become the then-youngest points-scorer in Formula One history, aged 19. He was promoted to parent team Red Bull in 2015, achieving his maiden podium finish at the Hungarian Grand Prix and outscoring teammate Daniel Ricciardo.

Having retained his seat at Red Bull for 2016 and achieving another podium in China, Kvyat was replaced by Max Verstappen following a controversial collision with Sebastian Vettel at the Russian Grand Prix. He remained at Toro Rosso for his 2017 campaign before being released at the end of the season, becoming a reserve driver for Ferrari. He returned to Toro Rosso—later renamed to AlphaTauri—in 2019 to partner Alex Albon and Pierre Gasly, taking his third career podium at the rain-affected German Grand Prix. Kvyat was replaced by Yuki Tsunoda at the conclusion of the 2020 season, departing as the most successful Russian driver in Formula One history; he achieved three podiums and one fastest lap across six seasons.

After serving as a reserve driver for Alpine in 2021, Kvyat was set to compete in the 2022 FIA World Endurance Championship for G-Drive prior to their withdrawal following the Russian invasion of Ukraine. Kvyat returned to WEC the next season with Prema, competing under an Italian licence. He then signed for Lamborghini in 2024, competing in the premier Hypercar class alongside Mirko Bortolotti and Edoardo Mortara. The team moved to the IMSA SportsCar Championship for 2025.

== Early and personal life ==
Daniil Kvyat was born in Ufa, Bashkortostan, Russia, on 26 April 1994 to Vyacheslav and Zulfiya Kvyat. Kvyat lived in Ufa until 2000 when his family moved to Moscow. This is where he first raced go-karts before first moving to Western Europe and racing competitively.

Kvyat resides in Monaco. In addition to his native Russian, he is also fluent in Italian, Spanish, and English, and has some ability in speaking Finnish and Dutch.

Rules introduced for the 2014 Formula One World Championship allowed the drivers to pick their own racing numbers that they will carry with them for the rest of their careers. When asked about which number he wanted, Kvyat revealed that 26 was the number he had chosen as he had no previous connection to it, and that he wanted to make it successful.

Kvyat's hobbies include table tennis, football, wakeboarding and skiing. He also likes heavy metal music, and has cited Metallica's "Whiskey in the Jar" cover and Motörhead's "Ace of Spades" as his two favourite songs. He plays the guitar.

Until November 2015, Kvyat was one of the few drivers in motor racing to have an FIA Super Licence, but not a regular driving licence in his native Russia.

In January 2017, Kvyat began dating Kelly Piquet, daughter of three-time F1 World Champion Nelson Piquet. The couple's first child, a daughter, was born in July 2019. The pair split in December 2019.

== Junior racing career ==
=== Karting ===
In January 2005, Kvyat made his professional debut in motorsports winning his first race in Sochi. During the 2005 and 2006 seasons, Kvyat participated in local events, including the Russian karting championship and cup as well as in the occasional races in Italy. Consistently demonstrating strong performances, he later moved to Italy to fully concentrate on racing in one of the most competitive environments. Kvyat's first professional team in Italy was Franco Pellegrini's crew.

During the winter of 2007, Kvyat's family moved to Italy to support his commitment demonstrated by his strong results. The young driver's parents stayed with him alternately, and he started education in Italian school, continuing to race in local tournaments. Before the start of the 2008 season, Kvyat, who had already proved himself in the Italian karting scene, signed a contract with the Zanardi factory team, led by well-known manager Dino Chiesa. Kvyat moved to the KF3 junior category and became a participant of the prestigious World Series Karting series. However, the Russian driver and Zanardi's partnership did not result in any success. He achieved European Championship qualification but Kvyat switched teams just before the championships started, to join privateers from Morsicani Racing, who used an FA Kart chassis. In their first race, the new partnership produced an excellent result: Kvyat, who had tested the new kart of the new team just a couple of days before the start of the championship, not only made it to the finals but was fighting for the win.

Kvyat and Morsicani Racing won several prestigious competitions, including WSK rounds and the Bridgestone Cup. The Russian defeated his Zanardi ex-teammate, Nyck de Vries, who was now a protégé of the McLaren Formula 1 team. Kvyat also won the Trofeo delle Industrie, in the final heat of which Kvyat finished ahead of Antonio Giovinazzi and Raffaele Marciello, future members of the Ferrari Academy.

Kvyat's European winning streak continued at the beginning of the 2009 season. The Morsicani Racing driver won the prestigious Winter Cup in the KF3 category and then added more victories to his name in the WSK rounds in Sarno and Le-Castellet. His victory in the Winter Cup was especially outstanding because he made it to the top of the podium after starting from the last position on the grid, where Kvyat found himself as a result of a clutch failure in qualifying. Kvyat first made his way into the final heat and then, starting from third, he won that race, overtaking Carlos Sainz Jr. along the way. Kvyat became one of the leaders in the WSK series, and began to draw the attention of sponsors. In the spring, he got backing from the Russian Lukoil company. However, the young driver was also noticed by Red Bull. During the summer, Kvyat participated in his first testing session in an open-wheel car, arranged by Red Bull alongside Carlos Sainz Jr, another candidate for the Red Bull Junior Team. Both drivers made a strong impression and signed contracts with the Austrian company.

Kvyat continued to race successfully in karting, taking the bronze at the 2009 European Championship one more time but was unable to reach the finals of the World Cup in Sarno. During the qualifying session slot, chosen for Kvyat by the team, it started to rain and his lap time was not fast enough in comparison with the times posted by drivers on the dry track. Improving his situation during the qualifying heats was barely possible, primarily because the team had decided to place their bets on their second driver, Italian Guliano Maria Niceta. Kvyat decided to part ways with Angelo Morsicani's team after the World Cup and joined the Intrepid factory team. He raced for Intrepid in the last two races of the WSK season, winning the final one. It was the last win of his career in karting as the Red Bull Junior Team bosses decided to progress Kvyat to the next level, straight into the cockpit of the Formula BMW car for the 2010 season.

=== Formula BMW ===
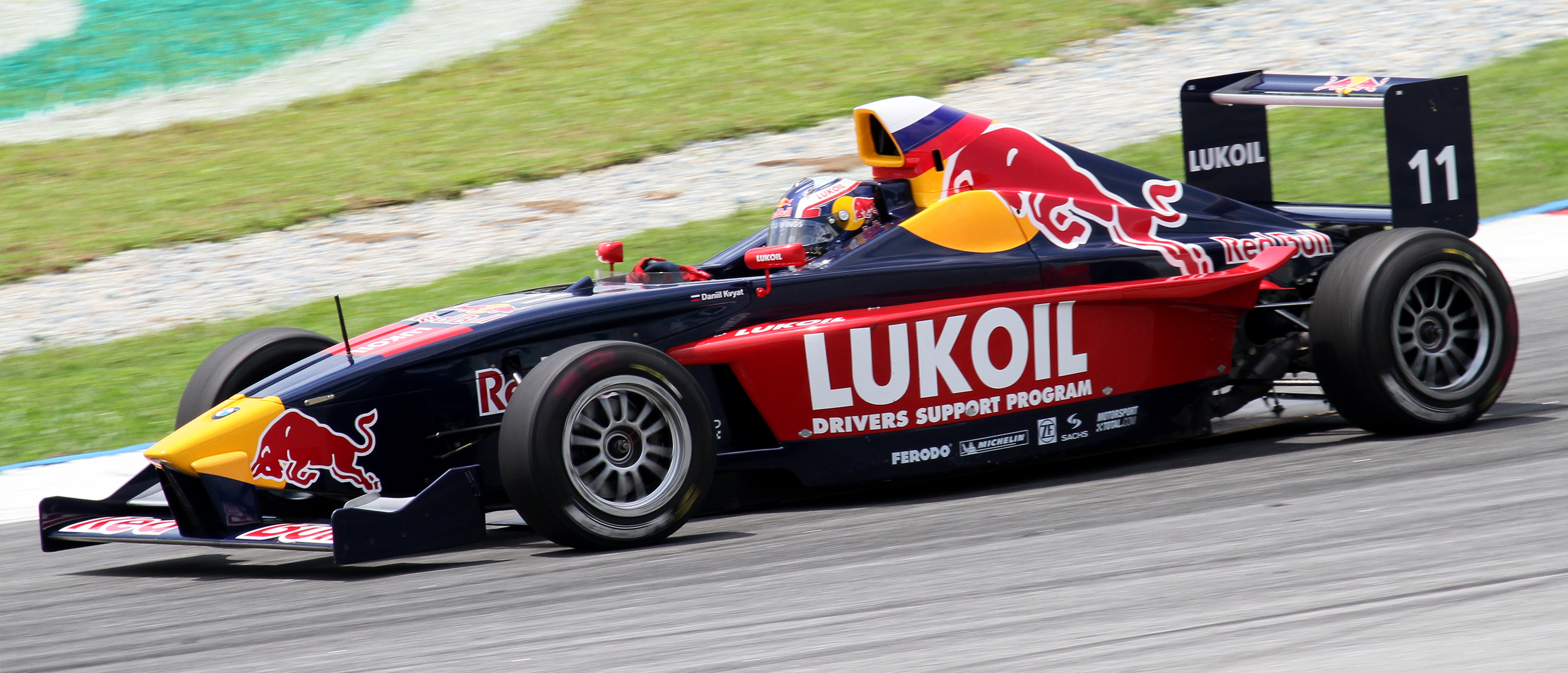
Kvyat during Race 1 of the 2010 Formula BMW Pacific season at Sepang International Circuit

Before the start of the European season, Kvyat travelled to Malaysia with the Eurointernational team, which prepared cars for both the Red Bull juniors, to race in the Formula BMW Asian Championship, where he won his first race. However, his first races back in Europe were not very successful. Sainz, who had more tests under the belt before his debut in open-wheelers, was the first to deliver a result. However, by mid-season, Kvyat had improved his results. In Germany, he qualified in the front row for the first time and after that he finished every race in the points, including the final round in Monza, where he finished in second place, making it to the podium for the first time during his debut European season. Two weeks later, Kvyat won a race in the Asian Championships in Singapore, a positive ending to his campaign in Formula BMW. The Bavarian company had earlier announced the closing of their open-wheel programme by the end of the 2010 season, so Kvyat could not continue to compete in the series.

=== Toyota Racing Series ===
Before the start of the 2011 season in Europe, Kvyat went for a pre-season boot camp in New Zealand to race in the Toyota Racing Series. He raced in four rounds for the Victory Motor Racing team, finishing fifth in the championship with a win in the Dan Higgins Trophy at Manfeild and another five podiums.

=== Formula Renault ===
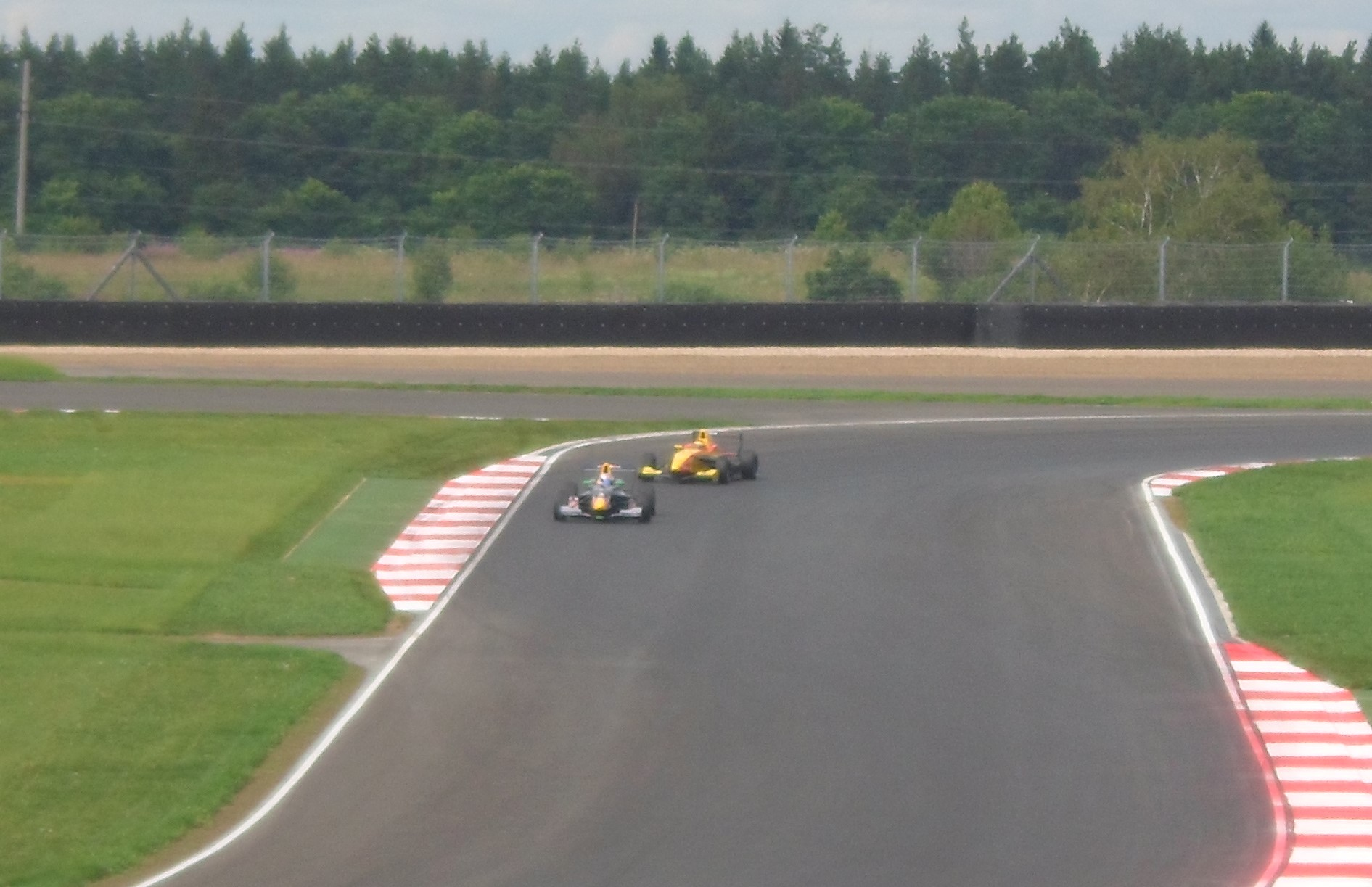
Kvyat (front) racing Stoffel Vandoorne (rear) in Formula Renault in 2012

After two races with Koiranen Bros. Motorsport in 2010, in the Eurocup Formula Renault 2.0 finale at Barcelona and a fourth-place finish in the Formula Renault UK Winter Series, Kvyat, and his Formula BMW and Red Bull Junior teammate Carlos Sainz Jr., joined Koiranen for full 2011 seasons in both the Eurocup and the Formula Renault 2.0 Northern European Cup. He finished as runner-up behind Sainz in the Northern European Cup standings with seven wins, including a hat-trick of wins at Monza. In the Eurocup he was outpaced by former Formula BMW rival Robin Frijns and Sainz, scoring two wins at Spa and the Nürburgring.

For 2012, Kvyat remained in the Formula Renault category, competing in both Formula Renault 2.0 Alps and the Eurocup Formula Renault 2.0 series. His debut in the Alps championship was marked with a dominating double win at Monza. In May he returned to the Eurocup, and recorded a double win in the opening round of the season at Motorland Aragón. In the Eurocup, Kvyat's main rival was Stoffel Vandoorne, who won four races versus Kvyat's six but he also never finished a single race below fourth. Kvyat lost points at Nürburgring due to a wrong tyre choice by his team, and at Hungaroring after crashing with Oliver Rowland. The fate of the title was decided in the last round of the championship in Barcelona. Koiranen GP made a wrong call in the mixed conditions and selected wet tyres for Kvyat although the circuit was drying up after the rain; most of the other drivers on the grid started on slick tires. Thus, having lost several positions in the last part of the race, Kvyat did not score enough points to secure the title. In the Alps series, Kvyat was fighting Norman Nato. Barcelona hosted the series finale just a couple of hours after the finish of the Eurocup race. Two title contenders crashed out and, having more overall points in the championship, Kvyat won the title. Russian driver remained with the Red Bull Junior Team and progressed to the GP3 Series for 2013.

=== Formula Three ===
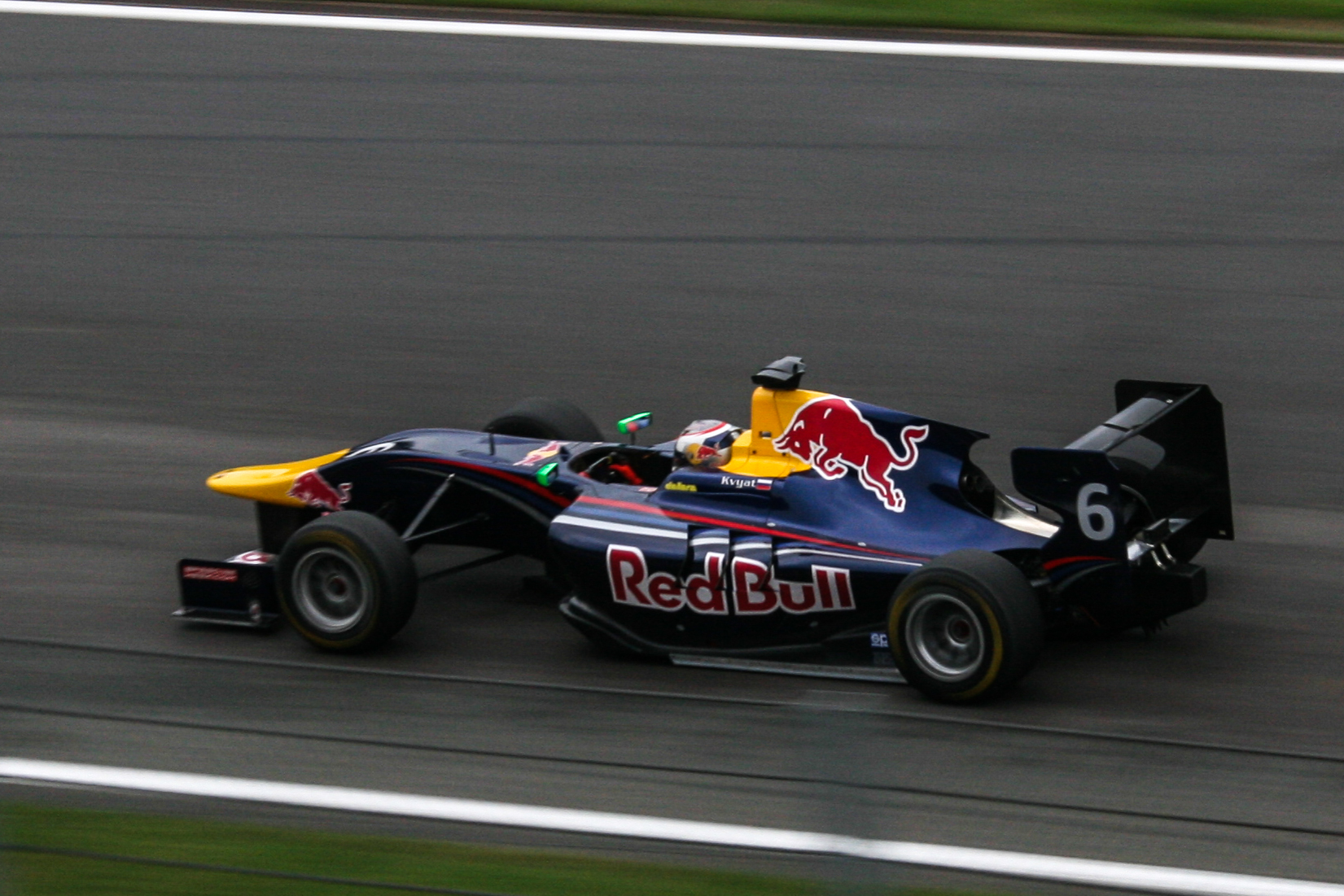
Kvyat competing for MW Arden during the 2013 GP3 Series, at Spa-Francorchamps.

Kvyat spent 2013 competing in the GP3 Series with MW Arden and the European Formula 3 championship with Carlin Motorsport. Kvyat was a late registration for the latter series, and so he was ineligible for points. He scored five pole positions, seven podiums and a dominant win at Zandvoort. His first win saw an unusual mistake on the part of event organisers: there was no record of National Anthem of Russia present at Zandvoort, and "The Patriotic Song" by Mikhail Glinka was played instead to celebrate Kvyat's win. After this race, he was offered a contract as a Formula 1 driver by Helmut Marko, head of the Red Bull Junior Team.

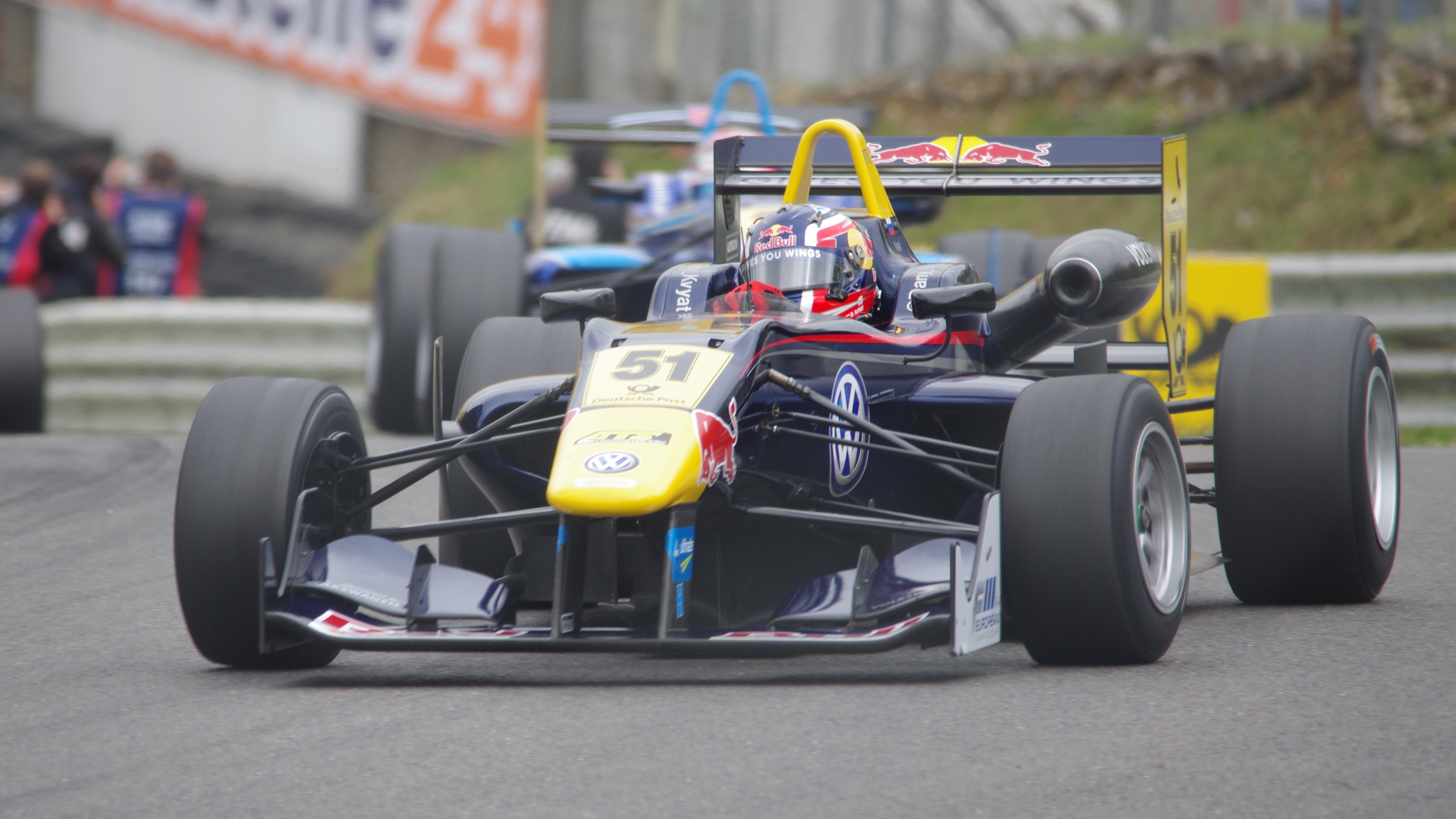
Kvyat racing at Brands Hatch during the 2013 European Formula 3 Championship

Carlos Sainz Jr. joined Kvyat as a teammate once again in GP3, after a mediocre season in Formula 3. The season start was a challenge for both drivers: struggling to find appropriate settings for the cars, both Kvyat and Sainz failed in the season opener. They managed to catch up with the leaders after a few rounds, once the Arden engineers mastered management of the Pirelli tyres. Kvyat scored his first podium in the series at Hungaroring in July, then won the race in Spa in August to decrease the points deficit between him and the leaders in the drivers' standings. He went into the Abu Dhabi event being a title contender and finally won the championship in his debut year. His performance in two final feature races at Monza and Abu Dhabi was notable: Kvyat scored a pole, a win, led every lap and recorded the fastest lap, gaining the maximum points available at both races.

== Formula One career ==
=== Toro Rosso (2014) ===
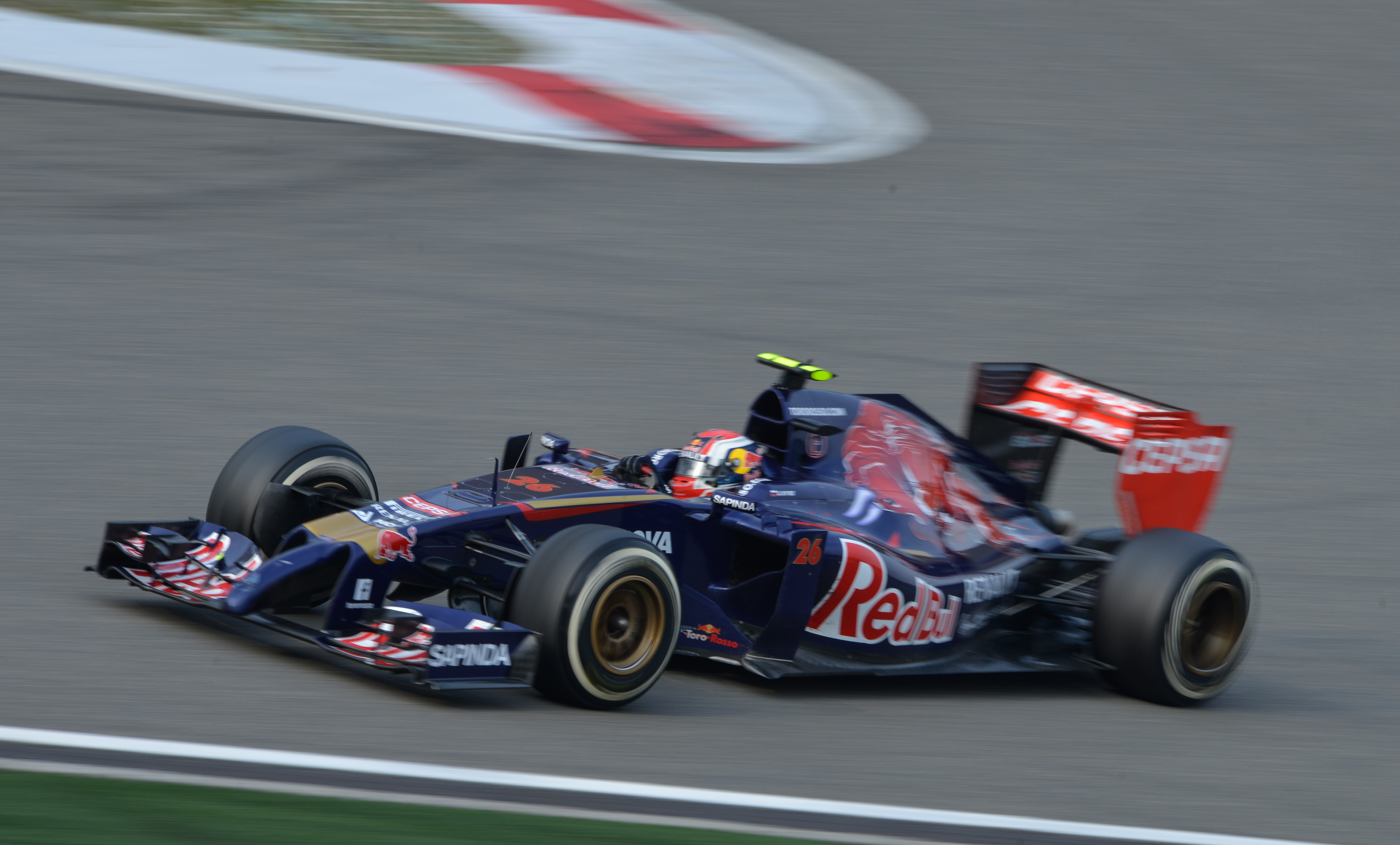
Kvyat at the 2014 Chinese Grand Prix

Kvyat became the second driver of the Scuderia Toro Rosso (STR) Formula One team for the 2014 season, alongside Frenchman Jean-Éric Vergne. He replaced Daniel Ricciardo, who moved to parent team Red Bull Racing. As a test driver for STR, he took part in Friday practice for the final two Grands Prix of the 2013 season, in the United States and Brazil. Kvyat made his F1 debut—aged just nineteen—in the 2014 Australian Grand Prix, where he made it into the top ten in qualifying and finished ninth in the race, breaking Sebastian Vettel's record as the youngest points-scorer in Formula One. He went on to score points in the Malaysian, Chinese, British and Belgian Grands Prix, finishing fifteenth in the World Championship. In September the organisers of the inaugural Russian Grand Prix announced their intention of naming a stand in the Sochi Autodrom after him.

=== Red Bull (2015–2016) ===
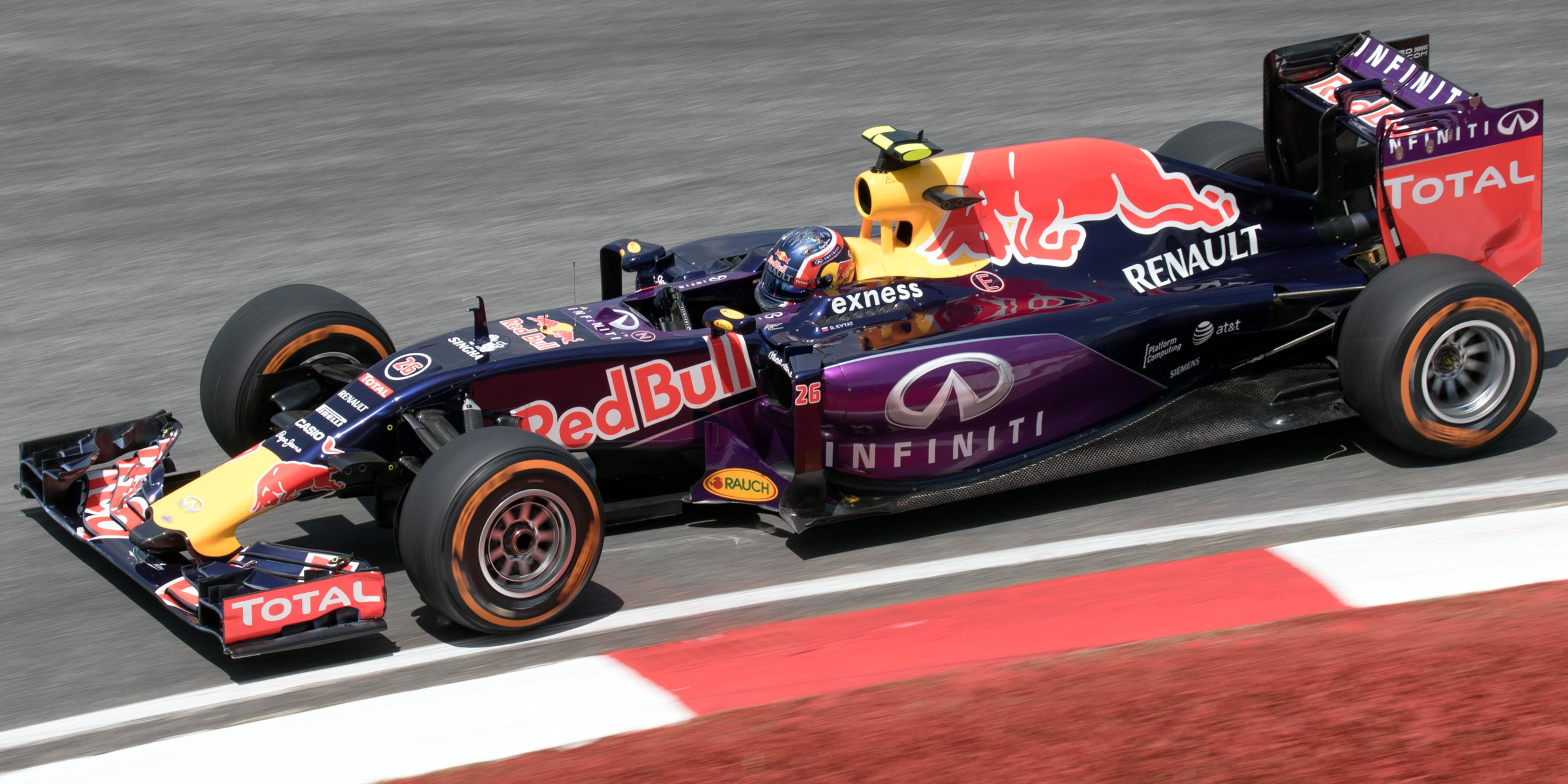
Kvyat at the 2015 Malaysian Grand Prix

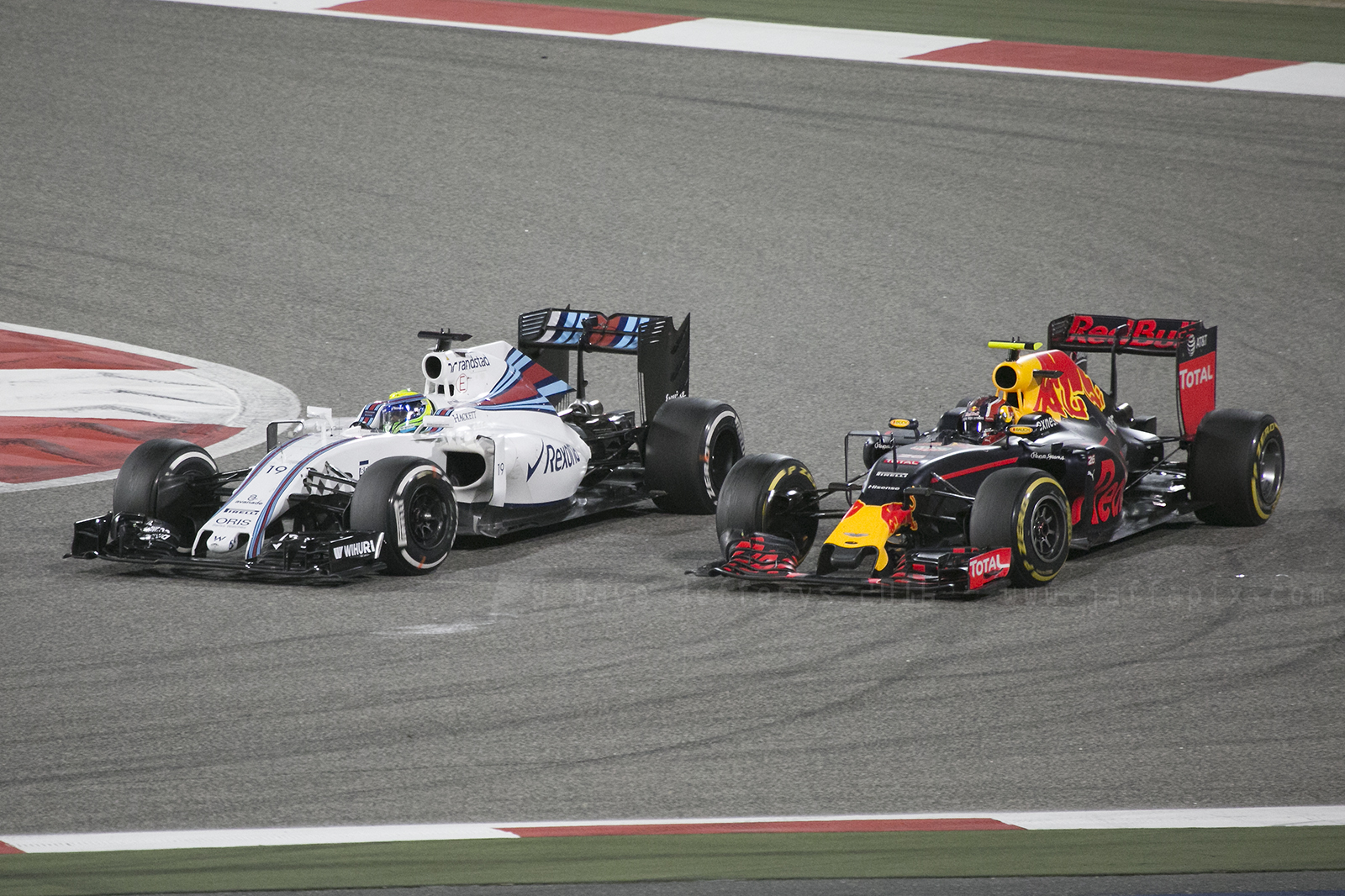
Kvyat (right) fighting with Felipe Massa at the 2016 Bahrain Grand Prix

Kvyat was promoted to Red Bull for the 2015 season, to replace the quadruple world champion Sebastian Vettel, who would move to Ferrari. He took his first podium in the sport with a second place finish at the 2015 Hungarian Grand Prix, the highest finish for a Russian driver in Formula One. As a result, Kvyat – aged 21 years, 91 days – became the second-youngest driver to record a podium finish, after Vettel. In qualifying for the 2015 Japanese Grand Prix, Kvyat crashed heavily into the barriers, ultimately flipping the car. He was uninjured, and finished thirteenth in the race the following day. Kvyat ended the 2015 season with 95 points and seventh place in Drivers' World Championship, beating his race winning teammate Daniel Ricciardo by three points.

The 2016 season start was a challenge again, but Kvyat finished third in the third round, securing the first podium for Red Bull Racing in the new season. However, after an incident during the start of his home Grand Prix when Kvyat collided with Sebastian Vettel's car, team management decided to demote Kvyat back to Toro Rosso.

=== Return to Toro Rosso (2016–2017) ===
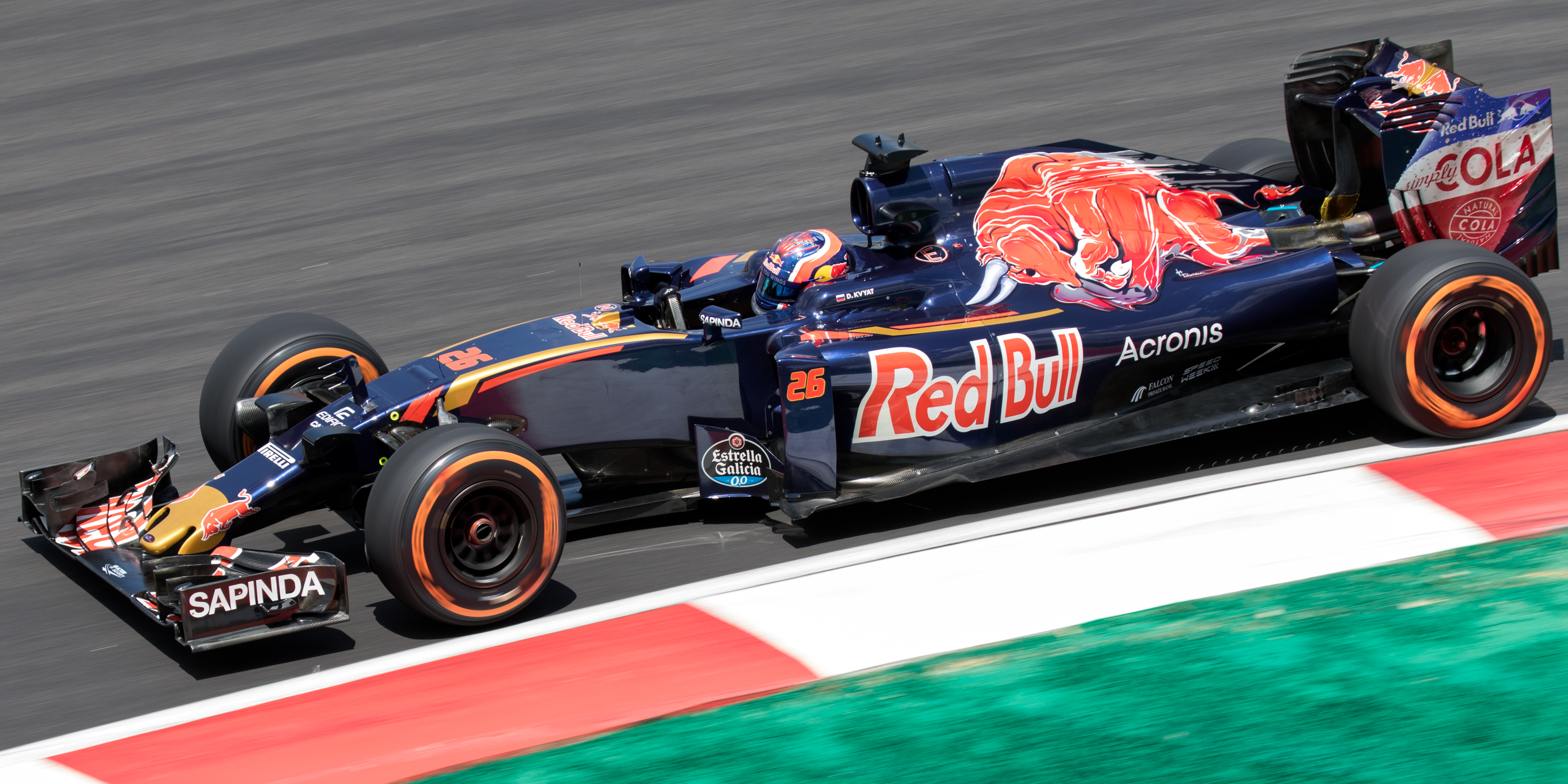
Kvyat at the 2016 Malaysian Grand Prix

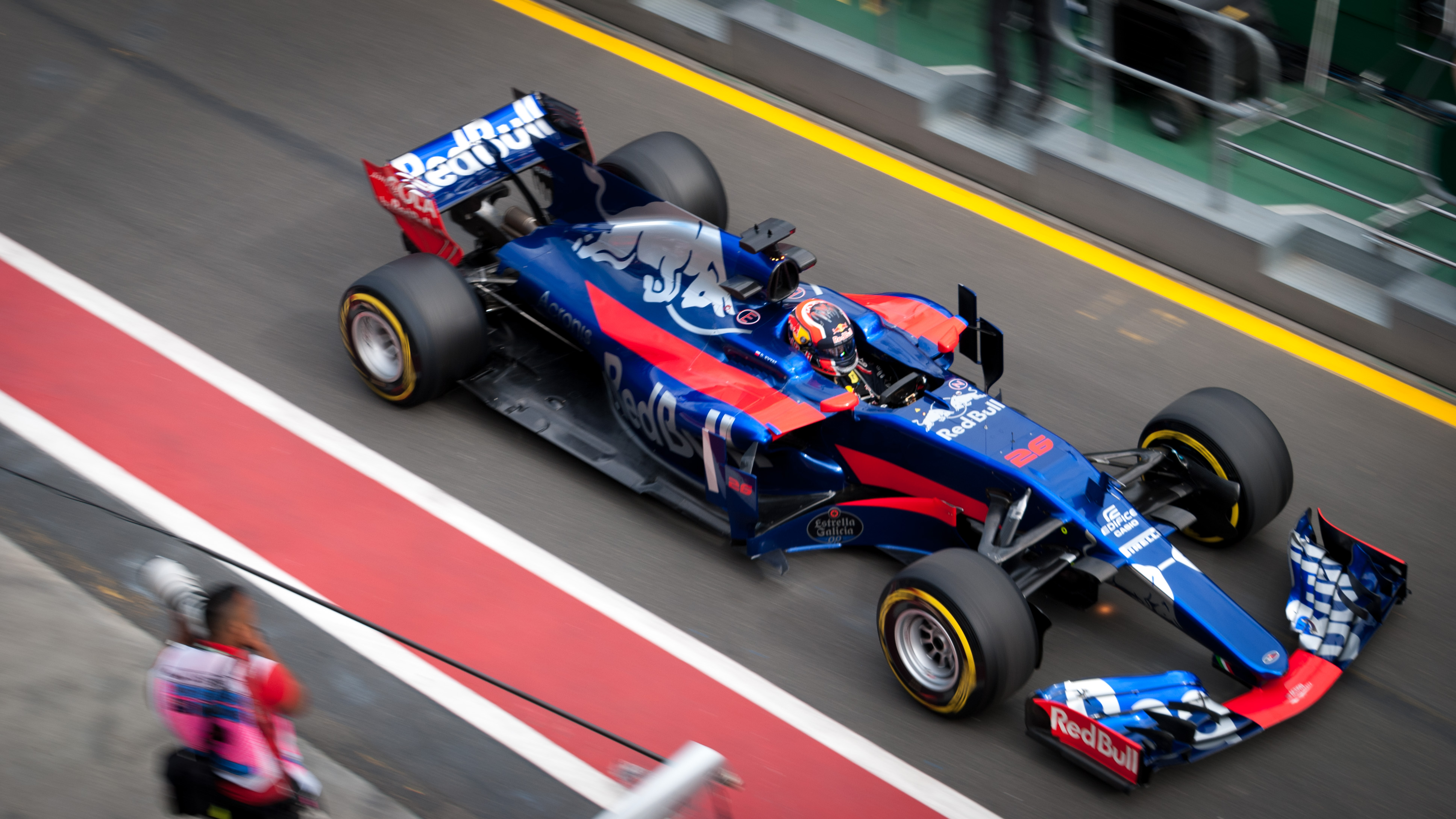
Kvyat driving for Toro Rosso at the 2017 Australian Grand Prix

In the week following the Russian Grand Prix, Red Bull announced that Toro Rosso driver Max Verstappen would be replacing Kvyat beginning from the following round, the Spanish Grand Prix, with Kvyat returning to Toro Rosso alongside Carlos Sainz Jr. According to Red Bull's team principal Christian Horner, "Dany will be able to continue his development at Toro Rosso, in a team that he is familiar with, giving him the chance to regain his form and show his potential." Kvyat spent some time adapting to the team and the new car, and returned to good shape, posting several strong performances in qualifying and races. It was announced ahead of the United States Grand Prix that Kvyat had been re-signed to Toro Rosso for 2017 after much intense speculation.

Although the opening phase of the championship looked promising, with both the car and the drivers demonstrating solid speed, regularly making it into the top ten, Kvyat's season was plagued by multiple problems, including several retirements due to technical failures and occasional driver's mistakes. On 26 September 2017, Toro Rosso announced the decision to replace Kvyat for the forthcoming Malaysian Grand Prix with Frenchman Pierre Gasly, following a sustained run of underwhelming form from the Russian. Whilst confirming the decision to stand Kvyat down, in a statement, Toro Rosso added that the driver switch should not be considered a permanent parting of the ways, saying "This is not a case of goodbye for our Daniil, as he still remains part of the Red Bull Family." Kvyat returned to racing for Toro Rosso at the United States Grand Prix, following teammate Carlos Sainz Jr.'s move to Renault, and Gasly attending the 2017 Super Formula Championship finale at Suzuka. Despite securing a points finish it was not enough to secure his seat once more as Toro Rosso chose to continue with New Zealander Brendon Hartley and welcome the return of Gasly to complete the team's pair in preparation for Mexico. In the week between the United States and Mexican Grands Prix, it was confirmed by Helmut Marko that Kvyat would not return to the team and would be released out of the Red Bull driver development programme.

On the day of the Mexican Grand Prix, Williams technical director Paddy Lowe said that Williams were considering him as an option for the 2018 season.

=== Ferrari development driver (2018) ===
After failing to attract a race seat for the 2018 season, Kvyat became a development driver for Ferrari. While mainly focusing on the team's simulator at Maranello, Kvyat drove the Ferrari SF71H for the first time at Fiorano, during a Pirelli wet weather test in April 2018.

=== Second return to Toro Rosso / AlphaTauri (2019–2020) ===
==== 2019 ====
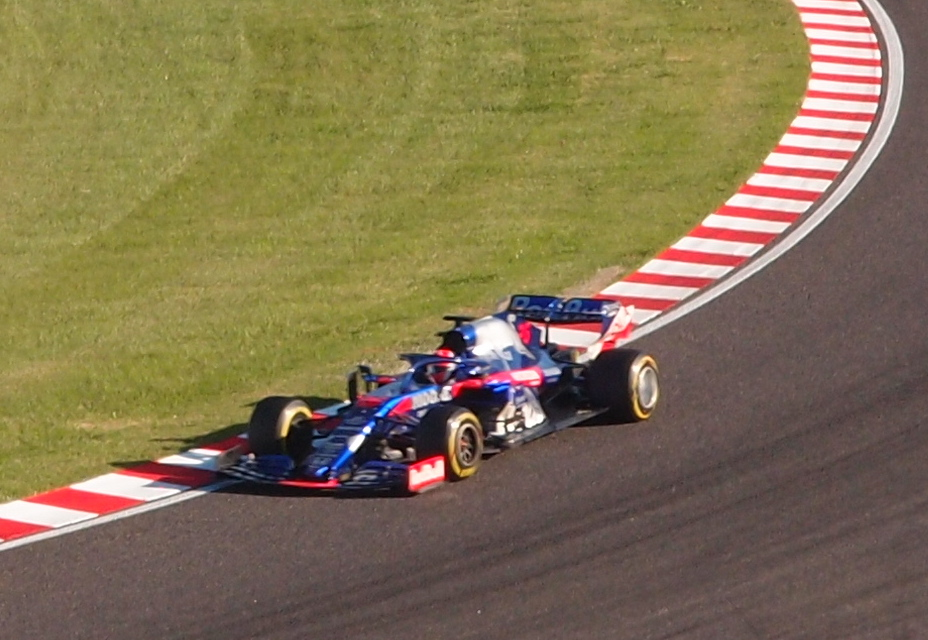
Kvyat at the 2019 Japanese Grand Prix

Kvyat rejoined Toro Rosso as a driver for the 2019 season, replacing the Red Bull-bound Pierre Gasly. This saw Kvyat race for the team he debuted in Formula One for a third time in his career. He initially raced alongside Thai driver Alexander Albon, who moved up from the FIA Formula 2 Championship. Kvyat put in strong performances during the first half of the season, achieving six points finishes from twelve races. However, he suffered consecutive retirements in China and Azerbaijan, both as a result of collision damage. His points finishes included seventh place in Monaco, a ninth place in Britain after starting from the back row of the grid and a shock third place podium finish at the rain-affected German Grand Prix. This came after a strategy call to pit for dry-weather tyres before the rest of the field and an overtake on Lance Stroll. This marked Kvyat's third career podium, and Toro Rosso's first podium since winning the 2008 Italian Grand Prix.

During the summer break prior to the Belgian Grand Prix, Kvyat's teammate Albon was promoted to Red Bull in August to replace Pierre Gasly, who was demoted back to Toro Rosso. Some questioned the decision not to promote Kvyat instead, as he had outscored Albon during the first half of the season. Red Bull justified the move by saying they wished to trial Albon for the remainder of the season to decide who would partner Max Verstappen at the team in 2020. Kvyat produced an excellent drive in Belgium to finish in seventh place after starting in nineteenth due to power unit penalties. His third retirement of the season came at the next race in Italy after suffering an oil leak. Kvyat recorded three more points finishes in the remainder of the season; two tenth place finishes in Japan and Brazil, and a ninth place finish in Abu Dhabi. He also finished in the points in Mexico and the United States, but was handed post-race penalties for causing last-lap collisions in both races, dropping him out of the points. Kvyat finished the season in thirteenth place in the championship with 37 points.

==== 2020 ====
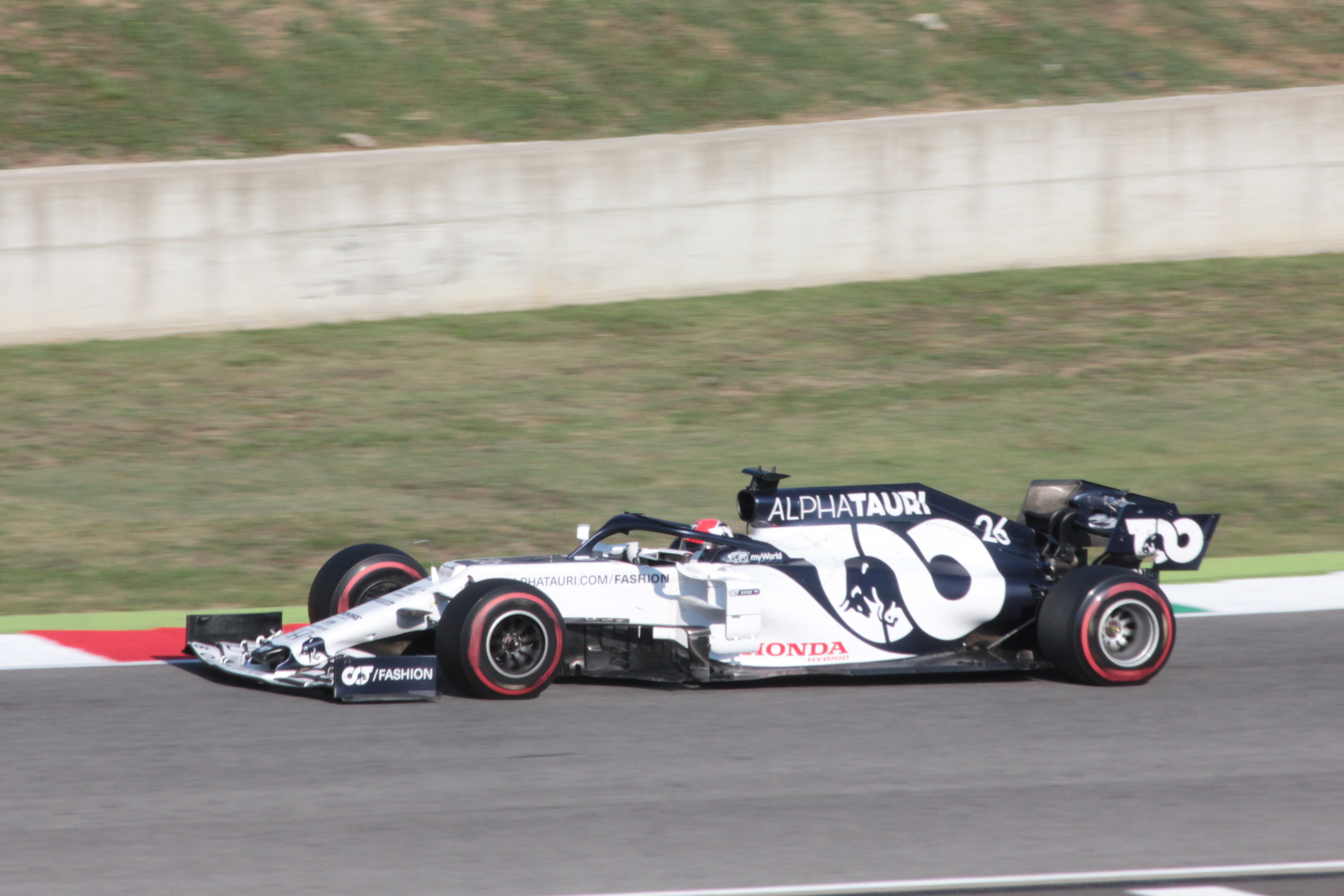
Kvyat at the 2020 Tuscan Grand Prix

AlphaTauri (previously Toro Rosso) retained Kvyat and Gasly for the 2020 season. Kvyat retired from the first race of the season (the 2020 Austrian Grand Prix) due to a suspension failure. He received his first point of the season at the Styrian Grand Prix with a tenth-place finish. He retired at the British Grand Prix after a heavy crash into the barriers that was caused by a tyre failure. Kvyat finished fourth in the 2020 Emilia Romagna Grand Prix after a succession of overtakes on Alexander Albon, Sergio Pérez and Charles Leclerc after the Safety car restart.

Kvyat finished the season 14th in the standings with 32 points, compared to team-mate Pierre Gasly who scored 75 points and finished tenth. His contract was not renewed and Yuki Tsunoda replaced Kvyat at AlphaTauri for 2021.

=== Alpine (2021, 2026–) ===
==== Reserve driver (2021) ====
In 2021, Kvyat was the reserve driver for Alpine, alongside Zhou Guanyu.

==== Simulator driver (2026–present) ====
In September 2026, it was revealed that Kvyat had re-joined Alpine as a simulator driver for the 2026 season.

== Sportscar racing career ==
=== FIA World Endurance Championship ===
==== 2022 ====
Kvyat was due to compete for G-Drive Racing in the LMP2 class in the 2022 FIA World Endurance Championship alongside James Allen and Rene Binder. However, G-Drive withdrew from the series on 6 March, two weeks before the first race of the season, in response to sanctions imposed by the FIA following the Russian invasion of Ukraine. Kvyat called the sanctions and restrictions against Russian athletes "unfair and discriminatory".

==== 2023 ====
Kvyat joined Prema Racing in the LMP2 class in 2023, driving the No. 63 Oreca 07 alongside Mirko Bortolotti and Doriane Pin, under an Italian license. At season-opening 1000 Miles of Sebring, Kvyat finished third to score his maiden WEC podium on debut. They finished fourth at Portimão (despite Kvyat receiving a 5-second penalty for causing a collision), with Kvyat losing third in the closing laps to a charging Louis Delétraz. At Spa, a 3-minute penalty caused the team to end up tenth. At the 24 Hours of Le Mans, Kvyat crashed out in the Porsche Curves during the night, causing the car's retirement. After placing seventh and tenth at Monza and Fuji respectively, Kvyat and his teammates finished fifth at the season finale in Bahrain. Kvyat's No. 63 Prema finished eighth in the teams' standings, one place ahead of the sister car.

==== 2024 ====
Kvyat joined Lamborghini in 2024 in the premier Hypercar class, driving the SC63 alongside Mirko Bortolotti and Edoardo Mortara. The trio scored their first points of the season at Le Mans, finishing tenth overall. Kvyat and his teammates did not score more points during the year, leading to Lamborghini finishing as the worst-placed full-time manufacturers in the championship.

=== IMSA SportsCar Championship ===
Going into 2025, Lamborghini switched to compete in the endurance races of the IMSA SportsCar Championship. Kvyat contested four races in the SC63, scoring a best result of fourth at Petit Le Mans alongside Mortara and Romain Grosjean. Lamborghini paused its top-class commitments following the season.

=== Super GT ===
In 2026, Kvyat made his Super GT debut in the GT300 class, driving a Lamborghini Huracán GT3 Evo 2 for the JLOC team alongside series veteran Takashi Kogure. At the season opener in Okayama, Kvyat charged up from 14th to sixth during the closing stint, which included a creative overtake on Hiroki Yoshida in the closing laps. After two scoreless results, the former coming as a result of two punctures, Kvyat and Kogure placed sixth at Suzuka. They then finished eighth at Sugo. At Autopolis, the duo initially finished fourth, but were later demoted out of the points positions for performing a driver change under safety car conditions. Their most successful weekend came at the season finale in Motegi: having been promoted to third in race 1 following a post-race penalty for another car, Kvyat benefited from fresh rear tyres to make a late pass on Sven Müller in race 2, allowing him and Kogure to win the race.

== Other racing ==
=== NASCAR ===
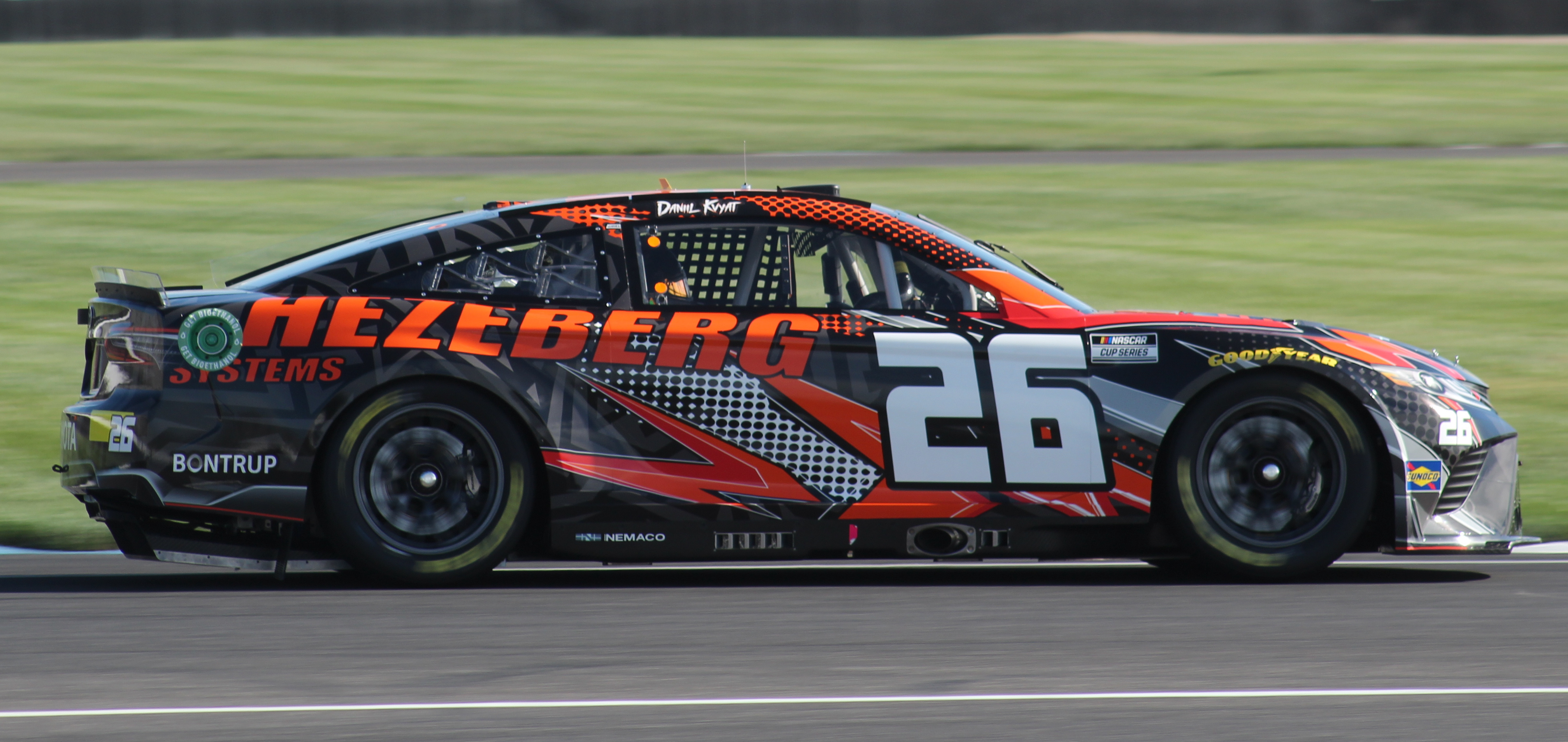
Kvyat's No. 26 car at Indianapolis Motor Speedway in 2022

In December 2017, Kvyat tested a NASCAR Whelen Euro Series racecar at a young driver test. Throughout 2021 and 2022, Kvyat attended multiple NASCAR Cup Series events including at Martinsville Speedway and Road America, and appearing in multiple teams' garages.

Kvyat made three starts in the 2022 NASCAR Cup Series for Team Hezeberg, with his car using the same number he used in Formula One, 26. He made his NASCAR debut in the 2022 Verizon 200 at the Brickyard at the Indianapolis Motor Speedway road course, finishing in 36th position after retiring from the race with suspension issues.

=== Formula E ===
In April 2023, Kvyat took part in the Berlin rookie drivers' test with Formula E team NIO 333 Racing. Kvyat returned with NIO in the rookie practice session at the Rome ePrix.

In 2025, Kvyat was chosen by DS Penske Formula E Team to take part in the Jeddah ePrix rookie free practice session. He finished the session in fifth place. He returned with the team to partake in the Berlin rookie test alongside Nikita Bedrin. For 2026, Kvyat was picked by DS Penske once again for the Madrid ePrix rookie test.

== Karting record ==
=== Karting career summary ===
Season	Series	Team	Position
2005	Torneo Industrie — Minikart		31st
2006	Torneo Industrie — Minikart		12th
2007	Torneo Industrie — KF3		16th
2007	Campeonato Italiano — 100 Junior	Viacheslav Kvyat	9th
2007	Copa de Campeones — KF3		11th
2008	South Garda Winter Cup — KF3	Chiesa Corse	9th
2008	Andrea Margutti Trophy — KF3	Chiesa Corse	13th
2008	Championnat de France — KF3		37th
2008	CIK-FIA European Championship — KF3	Morsicani Racing	3rd
2008	WSK International Series — KF3	Morsicani Racing	29th
2008	Bridgestone Cup European Final — KF3	Morsicani Racing	1st
2008	Silver Cup — KF3	Morsicani Racing	1st
2008	Torneo Industrie — KF3	Morsicani Racing	1st
2008	CIK-FIA Asia-Pacific Championship — KF3	Morsicani Racing	2nd
2008	Copa de Campeones — KF3	Morsicani Racing	14th
2009	South Garda Winter Cup — KF3	Morsicani Racing	1st
2009	Andrea Margutti Trophy — KF3	Morsicani Racing	1st
2009	CIK-FIA European Championship — KF3	Morsicani Racing	3rd
2009	CIK-FIA World Cup — KF3	Morsicani Racing	46th
2009	WSK International Series — KF3	Morsicani Racing	2nd

== Racing record ==
=== Racing career summary ===
Season	Series	Team	Races	Wins	Poles	F/Laps	Podiums	Points	Position
2010	Formula BMW Europe	EuroInternational	16	0	0	0	1	138	10th
2010	Formula BMW Pacific	EuroInternational	8	2	2	0	5	—N/a	NC†
2010	Formula Renault UK Winter Series	Koiranen Bros. Motorsport	6	0	1	0	2	109	4th
2010	Eurocup Formula Renault 2.0	Koiranen Bros. Motorsport	2	0	0	0	0	—N/a	NC†
2011	Eurocup Formula Renault 2.0	Koiranen Motorsport	14	2	2	3	6	155	**3rd**
2011	Formula Renault 2.0 NEC	Koiranen Motorsport	20	7	2	5	13	431	**2nd**
2011	Formula Renault UK Finals Series	Koiranen Motorsport	6	0	0	1	2	111	**3rd**
2011	Toyota Racing Series	Victory Motor Racing	12	1	1	3	6	138	5th
2012	Eurocup Formula Renault 2.0	Koiranen Motorsport	14	7	3	5	9	234	**2nd**
2012	Formula Renault 2.0 Alps	Koiranen Motorsport	14	7	4	4	8	217	**1st**
2013	GP3 Series	MW Arden	16	3	2	4	5	168	**1st**
2013	FIA Formula 3 European Championship	Carlin	21	1	5	1	7	—N/a	NC†
2013	Formula One	Scuderia Toro Rosso	Test driver						
2014	Formula One	Scuderia Toro Rosso	19	0	0	0	0	8	15th
2015	Formula One	Red Bull Racing	19	0	0	0	1	95	7th
2016	Formula One	Red Bull Racing	4	0	0	0	1	25	14th
2016	Formula One	Scuderia Toro Rosso	17	0	0	1	0	25	14th
2017	Formula One	Scuderia Toro Rosso	15	0	0	0	0	5	19th
2018	Formula One	Scuderia Ferrari	Third driver						
2019	Formula One	Red Bull Toro Rosso Honda	21	0	0	0	1	37	13th
2020	Formula One	Scuderia AlphaTauri Honda	17	0	0	0	0	32	14th
2021	Formula One	Alpine F1 Team	Reserve driver						
2022	NASCAR Cup Series	Team Hezeberg by Reaume Brothers Racing	3	0	0	0	0	—N/a	NC†
2022	NASCAR Xfinity Series	Sam Hunt Racing	1	0	0	0	0	22	59th
2022	Russian Endurance Challenge	G-Drive Racing	1	1	1	1	1	100	**1st**
2023	FIA World Endurance Championship – LMP2	Prema Racing	7	0	1	0	1	63	9th
2023	24 Hours of Le Mans – LMP2	Prema Racing	1	0	0	0	0	—N/a	DNF
2024	FIA World Endurance Championship – Hypercar	Lamborghini Iron Lynx	8	0	0	0	0	2	31st
2024	24 Hours of Le Mans – Hypercar	Lamborghini Iron Lynx	1	0	0	0	0	—N/a	10th
2024	NASCAR Xfinity Series	SS-Green Light Racing	1	0	0	0	0	16	66th
2025	IMSA SportsCar Championship – GTP	Automobili Lamborghini Squadra Corse	4	0	0	0	0	976	17th
2026	Super GT - GT300	JLOC	8	1	1	0	2	70	4th

^{†} As Kvyat was a guest driver, he was ineligible for points.

=== Complete Formula BMW Europe results ===
(key) (Races in bold indicate pole position; races in italics indicate fastest lap)

Year	Team	1	2	3	4	5	6	7	8	9	10	11	12	13	14	15	16	Pos	Points
2010	EuroInternational	CAT; 1; 9	CAT; 2; 10	ZAN; 1; 11	ZAN; 2 Ret	VAL; 1 Ret	VAL; 2; 8	SIL; 1; 14	SIL; 2; 11	HOC; 1; 5	HOC; 2; 4	HUN; 1; 6	HUN; 2 Ret	SPA; 1; 6	SPA; 2; 5	MNZ; 1 Ret	MNZ; 2; 2	10th	138

=== Complete Eurocup Formula Renault 2.0 results ===
(key) (Races in bold indicate pole position) (Races in italics indicate fastest lap)

Year	Entrant	1	2	3	4	5	6	7	8	9	10	11	12	13	14	15	16	Pos	Points
2010	Koiranen Bros. Motorsport	ALC; 1	ALC; 2	SPA; 1	SPA; 2	BRN; 1	BRN; 2	MAG; 1	MAG; 2	HUN; 1	HUN; 2	HOC; 1	HOC; 2	SIL; 1	SIL; 2	CAT; 1; 18	CAT; 2; 8	NC^{†}	0
2011	Koiranen Motorsport	ALC; 1 Ret	ALC; 2; 5	SPA; 1; 4	SPA; 2; 1	NÜR; 1; 7	**NÜR**; **2**; 1	**HUN**; **1**; 3	HUN; 2; 11	SIL; 1; 8	SIL; 2; 5	LEC; 1; 2	LEC; 2; 3	CAT; 1; 3	CAT; 2 Ret			3rd	155
2012	Koiranen Motorsport	**ALC**; **1**; 1	ALC; 2; 1	SPA; 1; 4	SPA; 2; 1	NÜR; 1; 5	NÜR; 2; 22	MSC; 1; 1	MSC; 2; 1	HUN; 1 Ret	**HUN**; **2**; 1	LEC; 1; 2	LEC; 2; 1	CAT; 1; 3	**CAT**; **2**; 8			2nd	234

^{†} As Kvyat was a guest driver, he was ineligible for points.

=== Complete Toyota Racing Series results ===
(key) (Races in bold indicate pole position; races in italics indicate fastest lap)

Year	Team	1	2	3	4	5	6	7	8	9	10	11	12	13	14	15	Pos	Points
2011	Victory Motor Racing	TER; 1; 3	TER; 2 Ret	TER; 3; 6	TIM; 1; 13	TIM; 2; 7	TIM; 3; 5	HMP; 1; 2	HMP; 2; 7	HMP; 3; 2	**MAN**; **1**; 1	MAN; 2; 3	MAN; 3; 2	TAU; 1	TAU; 2	TAU; 3	5th	600

=== Complete Formula Renault 2.0 NEC results ===
(key) (Races in bold indicate pole position; races in italics indicate fastest lap)

Year	Team	1	2	3	4	5	6	7	8	9	10	11	12	13	14	15	16	17	18	19	20	Pos	Points
2011	Koiranen Motorsport	HOC; 1; 1	HOC; 2; 3	HOC; 3; 5	SPA; 1; 4	SPA; 2; 1	NÜR; 1; 8	NÜR; 2; 9	ASS; 1; 9	ASS; 2; 2	ASS; 3; 6	OSC; 1; 5	OSC; 2; 3	ZAN; 1; 2	ZAN; 2; 6	**MST**; **1**; 1	MST; 2; 2	MST; 3; 1	MNZ; 1; 1	**MNZ**; **2**; 1	MNZ; 3; 1	2nd	441

=== Complete Formula Renault 2.0 Alps Series results ===
(key) (Races in bold indicate pole position; races in italics indicate fastest lap)

Year	Team	1	2	3	4	5	6	7	8	9	10	11	12	13	14	Pos	Points
2012	Koiranen Motorsport	MNZ; 1; 1	**MNZ**; **2**; 1	PAU; 1; 7	PAU; 2 Ret	IMO; 1; 4	IMO; 2 Ret	SPA; 1; 1	SPA; 2; 10	RBR; 1; 1	RBR; 2; 1	**MUG**; **1**; 1	**MUG**; **2**; 1	CAT; 1; 3	**CAT**; **2** Ret	1st	217

=== Complete FIA Formula 3 European Championship results ===
(key) (Races in bold indicate pole position; races in italics indicate fastest lap)

Year	Entrant	Engine	1	2	3	4	5	6	7	8	9	10	11	12	13	14	15	16	17	18	19	20	21	22	23	24	25	26	27	28	29	30	DC	Points
2013	Carlin	Volkswagen	MNZ; 1	MNZ; 2	MNZ; 3	SIL; 1	SIL; 2	SIL; 3	HOC; 1; 10	HOC; 2; 12	**HOC**; **3**; 3	BRH; 1; 10	BRH; 2; 12	BRH; 3; 14	**RBR**; **1**; 2	**RBR**; **2**; 2	**RBR**; **3**; 2	NOR; 1 Ret	NOR; 2; 12	NOR; 3 Ret	NÜR; 1; 9	NÜR; 2; 13	NÜR; 3; 16	**ZAN**; **1**; 1	ZAN; 2; 3	ZAN; 3; 4	VAL; 1; 4	VAL; 2; 3	VAL; 3; 7	HOC; 1	HOC; 2	HOC; 3	NC^{‡}	0

^{‡} As Kvyat was a guest driver, he was ineligible to score championship points.

=== Complete GP3 Series results ===
(key) (Races in bold indicate pole position; races in italics indicate fastest lap)

Year	Entrant	1	2	3	4	5	6	7	8	9	10	11	12	13	14	15	16	Pos	Points
2013	MW Arden	CAT; FEA; 20	CAT; SPR; Ret	VAL; FEA; 4	VAL; SPR; 5	SIL; FEA; 4	SIL; SPR; 4	NÜR; FEA; Ret	NÜR; SPR; 16	HUN; FEA; 3	HUN; SPR; 7	SPA; FEA; 1	SPA; SPR; 6	**MNZ**; **FEA**; 1	MNZ; SPR; 2	**YMC**; **FEA**; 1	YMC; SPR; 5	**1st**	**168**

=== Complete Formula One results ===
(key) (Races in bold indicate pole position; races in italics indicates fastest lap)

Year	Entrant	Chassis	Engine	1	2	3	4	5	6	7	8	9	10	11	12	13	14	15	16	17	18	19	20	21	WDC	Points
2013	Scuderia Toro Rosso	Toro Rosso STR8	Ferrari 056 2.4 V8	AUS	MAL	CHN	BHR	ESP	MON	CAN	GBR	GER	HUN	BEL	ITA	SIN	JPN	KOR	IND	ABU	USA; TD	BRA; TD			–	–
2014	Scuderia Toro Rosso	Toro Rosso STR9	Renault Energy F1‑2014 1.6 V6 t	AUS; 9	MAL; 10	BHR; 11	CHN; 10	ESP; 14	MON; Ret	CAN; Ret	AUT; Ret	GBR; 9	GER; Ret	HUN; 14	BEL; 9	ITA; 11	SIN; 14	JPN; 11	RUS; 14	USA; 15	BRA; 11	ABU; Ret			15th	8
2015	Infiniti Red Bull Racing	Red Bull RB11	Renault Energy F1-2015 1.6 V6 t	AUS; DNS	MAL; 9	CHN; Ret	BHR; 9	ESP; 10	MON; 4	CAN; 9	AUT; 12	GBR; 6	HUN; 2	BEL; 4	ITA; 10	SIN; 6	JPN; 13	RUS; 5	USA; Ret	MEX; 4	BRA; 7	ABU; 10			7th	95
2016	Red Bull Racing	Red Bull RB12	TAG Heuer 1.6 V6 t	AUS; DNS	BHR; 7	CHN; 3	RUS; 15																		14th	25
2016	Scuderia Toro Rosso	Toro Rosso STR11	Ferrari 060 1.6 V6 t					ESP; 10	MON; Ret	CAN; 12	EUR; Ret	AUT; Ret	GBR; 10	HUN; 16	GER; 15	BEL; 14	ITA; Ret	SIN; 9	MAL; 14	JPN; 13	USA; 11	MEX; 18	BRA; 13	ABU; Ret	14th	25
2017	Scuderia Toro Rosso	Toro Rosso STR12	Toro Rosso 1.6 V6 t	AUS; 9	CHN; Ret	BHR; 12	RUS; 12	ESP; 9	MON; 14^{†}	CAN; Ret	AZE; Ret	AUT; 16	GBR; 15	HUN; 11	BEL; 12	ITA; 12	SIN; Ret	MAL	JPN	USA; 10	MEX	BRA	ABU		19th	5
2019	Red Bull Toro Rosso Honda	Scuderia Toro Rosso STR14	Honda RA619H 1.6 V6 t	AUS; 10	BHR; 12	CHN; Ret	AZE; Ret	ESP; 9	MON; 7	CAN; 10	FRA; 14	AUT; 17	GBR; 9	GER; 3	HUN; 15	BEL; 7	ITA; Ret	SIN; 15	RUS; 12	JPN; 10	MEX; 11	USA; 12	BRA; 10	ABU; 9	13th	37
2020	Scuderia AlphaTauri Honda	AlphaTauri AT01	Honda RA620H 1.6 V6 t	AUT; 12†	STY; 10	HUN; 12	GBR; Ret	70A; 10	ESP; 12	BEL; 11	ITA; 9	TUS; 7	RUS; 8	EIF; 15	POR; 19	EMI; 4	TUR; 12	BHR; 11	SKH; 7	ABU; 11					14th	32

^{†} Did not finish, but was classified as he had completed more than 90% of the race distance.

=== NASCAR ===
(key) (Bold – Pole position awarded by qualifying time. Italics – Pole position earned by points standings or practice time. * – Most laps led.)

==== Cup Series ====
NASCAR Cup Series results
Year	Team	No.	Make	1	2	3	4	5	6	7	8	9	10	11	12	13	14	15	16	17	18	19	20	21	22	23	24	25	26	27	28	29	30	31	32	33	34	35	36	NCSC	Pts	Ref
2022	Team Hezeberg	26	Toyota	DAY	CAL	LVS	PHO	ATL	COA	RCH	MAR	BRD	TAL	DOV	DAR	KAN	CLT	GTW	SON	NSH	ROA	ATL	NHA	POC	IRC; 36	MCH	RCH	GLN; 36	DAY	DAR	KAN	BRI	TEX	TAL	ROV; 39	LVS	HOM	MAR	PHO	61st	0^{1}	

==== Xfinity Series ====
NASCAR Xfinity Series results
Year	Team	No.	Make	1	2	3	4	5	6	7	8	9	10	11	12	13	14	15	16	17	18	19	20	21	22	23	24	25	26	27	28	29	30	31	32	33	NXSC	Pts	Ref
2022	Sam Hunt Racing	26	Toyota	DAY	CAL	LVS	PHO	ATL	COA	RCH	MAR	TAL	DOV	DAR	TEX	CLT	PIR	NSH	ROA	ATL	NHA	POC	IRC	MCH	GLN	DAY	DAR	KAN	BRI	TEX	TAL	ROV; 15	LVS	HOM	MAR	PHO	59th	22	
2024	SS-Green Light Racing	07	Chevy	DAY	ATL	LVS	PHO	COA; 21	RCH	MAR	TEX	TAL	DOV	DAR	CLT	PIR	SON	IOW	NHA	NSH	CSC	POC	IND	MCH	DAY	DAR	ATL	GLN	BRI	KAN	TAL	ROV	LVS	HOM	MAR	PHO	66th	16	

=== Complete FIA World Endurance Championship results ===
(key) (Races in bold indicate pole position) (Races in italics indicate fastest lap)

Year	Entrant	Class	Car	Engine	1	2	3	4	5	6	7	8	Rank	Points
2023	Prema Racing	LMP2	Oreca 07	Gibson GK428 4.2 L V8	SEB; 2	**ALG**; 4	SPA; 10	LMS; Ret	MNZ; 7	FUJ; 10	BHR; 5		9th	63
2024	Lamborghini Iron Lynx	Hypercar	Lamborghini SC63	Lamborghini 3.8 L Turbo V8	QAT; 13	IMO; 12	SPA; Ret	LMS; 10	SAP; 17	COA; 14	FUJ; Ret	BHR; Ret	31st	2

=== Complete 24 Hours of Le Mans results ===
Year	Team	Co-Drivers	Car	Class	Laps	Pos.	Class Pos.
2023	(Italy) Prema Racing	(Italy) Mirko Bortolotti (France) Doriane Pin	Oreca 07-Gibson	LMP2	113	DNF	DNF
2024	(Italy) Lamborghini Iron Lynx	(Italy) Mirko Bortolotti (Italy) Edoardo Mortara	Lamborghini SC63	Hypercar	309	10th	10th

=== Complete IMSA SportsCar Championship results ===
(key) (Races in bold indicate pole position; races in italics indicate fastest lap)

Year	Team	Class	Make	Engine	1	2	3	4	5	6	7	8	9	Rank	Points
2025	Automobili Lamborghini Squadra Corse	GTP	Lamborghini SC63	Lamborghini 3.8 L Turbo V8	DAY; 12	SEB; 13	LBH	LGA	DET	WGL; 7	ELK	IMS	PET; 4	17th	976

=== Complete Super GT results ===
(key) (Races in bold indicate pole position) (Races in italics indicate fastest lap)

Year	Team	Car	Class	1	2	3	4	5	6	7	8	Pos.	Points
2026	JLOC	Lamborghini Huracán GT3 EVO2	GT300	OKA; 6	FUJ; 24	FUJ; 17	SUZ; 6	SUG; 8	AUT; DSQ	MOT; 3	**MOT**; 1	4th	70

Sporting positions
Preceded by Javier Tarancón	Formula Renault 2.0 Alps; Champion; 2012	Succeeded by Antonio Fuoco
Preceded by Mitch Evans	GP3 Series; Champion; 2013	Succeeded by Alex Lynn
Awards
Preceded by Jules Bianchi	Autosport Awards; Rookie of the Year; 2014	Succeeded by Max Verstappen
New award	FIA Rookie of the Year; 2014	Succeeded by Max Verstappen
Records
Preceded by Sebastian Vettel; 19 years, 349 days (2007 United States Grand Prix)	Youngest Driver to score points in Formula One; 19 years, 324 days (2014 Australian Grand Prix)	Succeeded by Max Verstappen; 17 years, 180 days (2015 Malaysian Grand Prix)
