= Kelly Piquet =

Brazilian blogger and model (born 1988)

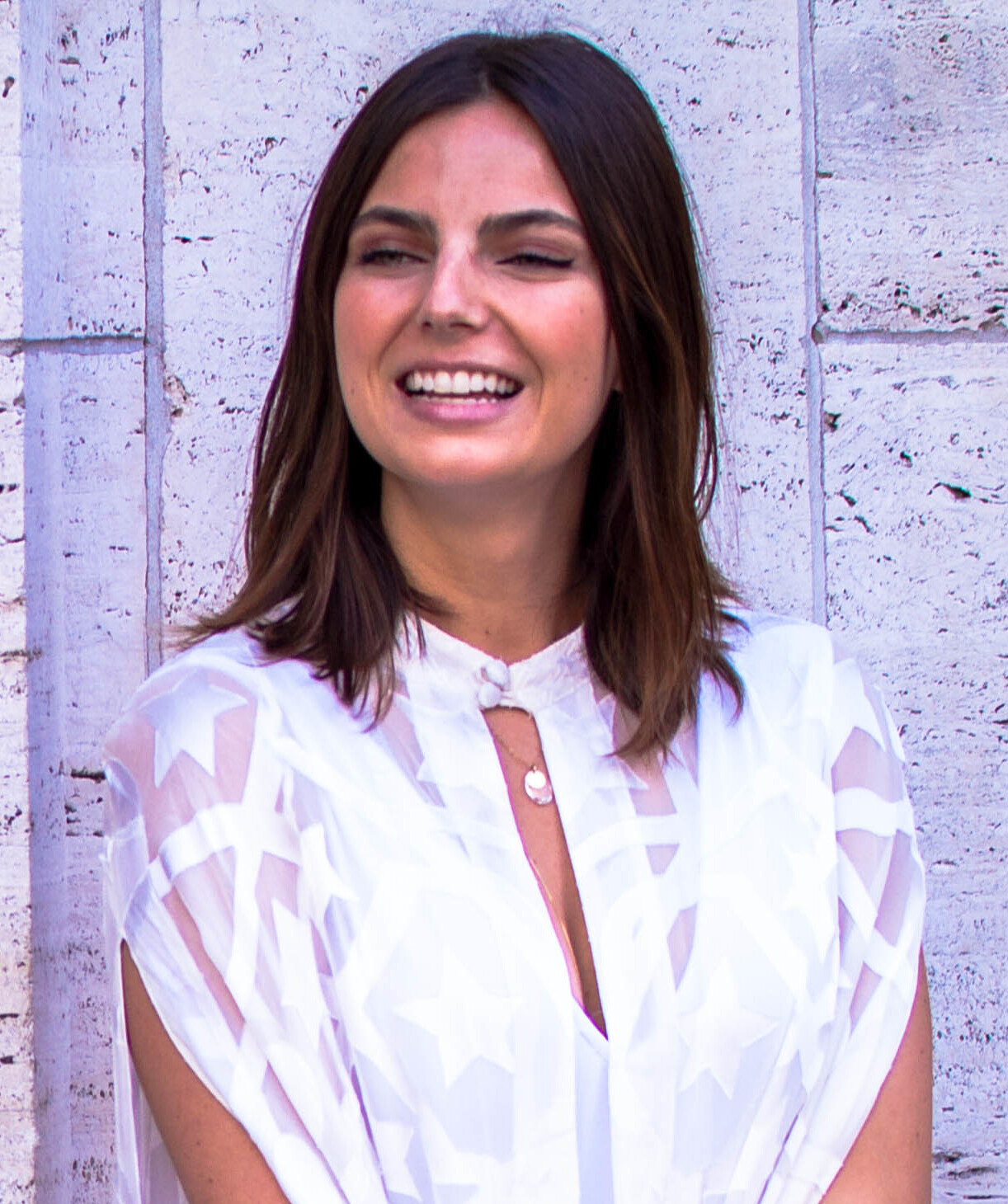
- Piquet at New York Fashion Week in 2014
- Born: Kelly Tamsma Piquet Souto Maior; 7 December 1988 (age 37); Homburg, Saarland, Germany
- Citizenship: Brazil; Netherlands
- Occupations: Model; columnist; blogger; public relations professional
- Partners: Daniil Kvyat (2017–2019); Max Verstappen (2020–present)
- Children: 2
- Parent: Nelson Piquet (father)
- Relatives: Nelson Piquet Jr. (brother); Pedro Piquet (half-brother); Daniel Suárez (brother-in-law)

Kelly Tamsma Piquet Souto Maior (born 7 December 1988) is a Brazilian and Dutch model, columnist, blogger, and public relations professional.

== Early life and education ==
Kelly Tamsma Piquet Souto Maior was born in Homburg, Germany. She is the daughter of Nelson Piquet, Brazilian racing driver and three-time Formula One World Champion, and Sylvia Tamsma, a Dutch model. She spent most of her childhood living in the South of France. At the age of 12, she moved to Brazil where she lived until she was 15 years old. After that, Piquet returned to France and lived there for another year before moving to England to study at a boarding school. At the age of 17, she returned to Brazil to attend her senior year of high school at the American School of Brasília. Piquet attended Marymount Manhattan College in New York City, majoring in international relations with an emphasis on political science and economics.

== Career ==
During college, she took an internship in fashion and decided to continue working in the area. She worked at Vogue Latinoamerica, Bergdorf Goodman, KCD PR agency, in addition to being a columnist for Marie Claire magazine.

As a model, Piquet posed for PatBO and Lucas Boccalão. She has walked the ramp in some fashion shows.

In April 2015, Piquet became responsible for Formula E social media coverage.

== Personal life ==
In January 2017, Piquet began dating Russian Formula One driver Daniil Kvyat. Piquet and Kvyat welcomed a daughter, Penelope, in July 2019. In December 2019, it was announced that Piquet and Kvyat had separated.

Piquet has been in a relationship with Dutch Formula One World Champion Max Verstappen since 2020. In April 2025, their daughter Lily was born.
