= 2016 Japanese Grand Prix =

Race 17 of 21 in the 2016 Formula One World Championship
← Previous race	Next race →

Race details
- Date: 9 October 2016
- Official name: 2016 Formula 1 Emirates Japanese Grand Prix
- Location: Suzuka Circuit, Suzuka, Mie Prefecture, Japan
- Course: Permanent racing facility
- Course length: 5.807 km (3.608 miles)
- Distance: 53 laps, 307.471 km (191.054 miles)
- Weather: Cloudy
- Attendance: 145,000

Pole position
Driver	(Germany) Nico Rosberg	Mercedes
- Time: 1:30.647

Fastest lap
Driver	(Germany) Sebastian Vettel	Ferrari
- Time: 1:35.118 on lap 36

Podium
First	(Germany) Nico Rosberg	Mercedes
Second	(Netherlands) Max Verstappen	Red Bull Racing-TAG Heuer
Third	(United Kingdom) Lewis Hamilton	Mercedes

The 2016 Japanese Grand Prix (formally known as the 2016 Formula 1 Emirates Japanese Grand Prix) was a Formula One motor race that was held on 9 October 2016 at the Suzuka Circuit in Suzuka, Mie, Japan. The race marked the 42nd running of the Japanese Grand Prix, the 30th time it has been held at Suzuka (28th time as a World Championship round), and the 32nd time that the race has been run as a World Championship event since the inaugural Formula One season in 1950.

Mercedes driver Nico Rosberg entered the round with a twenty-three-point lead over teammate Lewis Hamilton in the World Drivers' Championship. Rosberg started the race from pole position and won the race, extending his championship lead to thirty-three points as Hamilton finished third behind Max Verstappen. Before the race, Mercedes held a 194-point lead over Red Bull Racing in the World Constructors' Championship, and with forty points for first and third places, secured their third consecutive title. In the Drivers' Championship, the field of title contenders narrowed to just two (Rosberg and Hamilton) after the race. This was Rosberg's 30th and final pole in Formula One as well as his 23rd and final Formula One victory.

== Report ==
=== Background ===
Sebastian Vettel entered the race with a three-place grid penalty for his role in causing an avoidable collision on the opening lap of the previous race.

=== Race ===
Lewis Hamilton fell to 8th at the start of the race due to a bad start which was compounded by being on the wetter side of the grid. For the second year in succession in the Japanese Grand Prix, all entrants were classified as having finished the race.

After the race, Nico Rosberg had enough lead in the World Drivers' Championship to win the title, even if Hamilton won all the remaining four races and he finished in second place every time - with this scenario happening, Rosberg won the title with a narrow five point lead (385 points, compared to Hamilton's 380).

== Classification ==
=== Qualifying ===
Pos.	Car no.	Driver	Constructor	Qualifying times			Final grid
Pos.	Car no.	Driver	Constructor	Q1	Q2	Q3	Final grid
1	6	(Germany) Nico Rosberg	Mercedes	1:31.858	1:30.714	1:30.647	1
2	44	(United Kingdom) Lewis Hamilton	Mercedes	1:32.218	1:31.129	1:30.660	2
3	7	(Finland) Kimi Räikkönen	Ferrari	1:31.674	1:31.406	1:30.949	8^{1}
4	5	(Germany) Sebastian Vettel	Ferrari	1:31.659	1:31.227	1:31.028	6^{2}
5	33	(Netherlands) Max Verstappen	Red Bull Racing-TAG Heuer	1:32.487	1:31.489	1:31.178	3
6	3	(Australia) Daniel Ricciardo	Red Bull Racing-TAG Heuer	1:32.538	1:31.719	1:31.240	4
7	11	(Mexico) Sergio Pérez	Force India-Mercedes	1:32.682	1:32.237	1:31.961	5
8	8	(France) Romain Grosjean	Haas-Ferrari	1:32.458	1:32.176	1:31.961	7
9	27	(Germany) Nico Hülkenberg	Force India-Mercedes	1:32.448	1:32.200	1:32.142	9
10	21	(Mexico) Esteban Gutiérrez	Haas-Ferrari	1:32.620	1:32.155	1:32.547	10
11	77	(Finland) Valtteri Bottas	Williams-Mercedes	1:32.383	1:32.315		11
12	19	(Brazil) Felipe Massa	Williams-Mercedes	1:32.562	1:32.380		12
13	26	(Russia) Daniil Kvyat	Toro Rosso-Ferrari	1:32.645	1:32.623		13
14	55	(Spain) Carlos Sainz Jr.	Toro Rosso-Ferrari	1:32.789	1:32.685		14
15	14	(Spain) Fernando Alonso	McLaren-Honda	1:32.819	1:32.689		15
16	30	(United Kingdom) Jolyon Palmer	Renault	1:32.796	1:32.807		16
17	22	(United Kingdom) Jenson Button	McLaren-Honda	1:32.851			22^{3}
18	20	(Denmark) Kevin Magnussen	Renault	1:33.023			17
19	9	(Sweden) Marcus Ericsson	Sauber-Ferrari	1:33.222			18
20	12	(Brazil) Felipe Nasr	Sauber-Ferrari	1:33.332			19
21	31	(France) Esteban Ocon	MRT-Mercedes	1:33.353			20
22	94	(Germany) Pascal Wehrlein	MRT-Mercedes	1:33.561			21^{1}
107% time: 1:38.075

Notes

- ^1 – Kimi Räikkönen and Pascal Wehrlein received a five-place grid penalty for an unscheduled gearbox change.
- ^2 – Sebastian Vettel received a three-place grid penalty for causing an avoidable collision at the previous race in Malaysia.
- ^3 – Jenson Button received a thirty-five-place grid penalty for exceeding his quota of power unit components.

=== Race ===
Pos.	No.	Driver	Constructor	Laps	Time/Retired	Grid	Points
1	6	(Germany) Nico Rosberg	Mercedes	53	1:26:43.333	1	25
2	33	(Netherlands) Max Verstappen	Red Bull Racing-TAG Heuer	53	+4.978	3	18
3	44	(United Kingdom) Lewis Hamilton	Mercedes	53	+5.776	2	15
4	5	(Germany) Sebastian Vettel	Ferrari	53	+20.269	6	12
5	7	(Finland) Kimi Räikkönen	Ferrari	53	+28.370	8	10
6	3	(Australia) Daniel Ricciardo	Red Bull Racing-TAG Heuer	53	+33.941	4	8
7	11	(Mexico) Sergio Pérez	Force India-Mercedes	53	+57.495	5	6
8	27	(Germany) Nico Hülkenberg	Force India-Mercedes	53	+59.177	9	4
9	19	(Brazil) Felipe Massa	Williams-Mercedes	53	+1:37.763	12	2
10	77	(Finland) Valtteri Bottas	Williams-Mercedes	53	+1:38.323	11	1
11	8	(France) Romain Grosjean	Haas-Ferrari	53	+1:39.254	7	
12	30	(United Kingdom) Jolyon Palmer	Renault	52	+1 Lap	16	
13	26	(Russia) Daniil Kvyat	Toro Rosso-Ferrari	52	+1 Lap	13	
14	20	(Denmark) Kevin Magnussen	Renault	52	+1 Lap	17	
15	9	(Sweden) Marcus Ericsson	Sauber-Ferrari	52	+1 Lap	18	
16	14	(Spain) Fernando Alonso	McLaren-Honda	52	+1 Lap	15	
17	55	(Spain) Carlos Sainz Jr.	Toro Rosso-Ferrari	52	+1 Lap	14	
18	22	(United Kingdom) Jenson Button	McLaren-Honda	52	+1 Lap	22	
19	12	(Brazil) Felipe Nasr	Sauber-Ferrari	52	+1 Lap	19	
20	21	(Mexico) Esteban Gutiérrez	Haas-Ferrari	52	+1 Lap	10	
21	31	(France) Esteban Ocon	MRT-Mercedes	52	+1 Lap	20	
22	94	(Germany) Pascal Wehrlein	MRT-Mercedes	52	+1 Lap	21	

== Championship standings after the race ==
- **Bold text** and an asterisk indicates who still had a theoretical chance of becoming World Champion.

Drivers' Championship standings

	Pos.	Driver	Points
	1	(Germany) **Nico Rosberg***	313
	2	(United Kingdom) **Lewis Hamilton***	280
	3	(Australia) Daniel Ricciardo	212
	4	(Finland) Kimi Räikkönen	170
1	5	(Netherlands) Max Verstappen	165

Constructors' Championship standings

Pos.	Constructor	Points
1	(Germany) **Mercedes**	593
2	(Austria) Red Bull Racing-TAG Heuer	385
3	(Italy) Ferrari	335
4	Force India-Mercedes	134
5	(United Kingdom) Williams-Mercedes	124

- Note: Only the top five positions are included for the sets of standings.
- **Bold text** indicates the 2016 World Constructors' Champions.
- Competitors in bold and marked with an asterisk still had a mathematical chance of becoming World Champion.

Previous race: 2016 Malaysian Grand Prix	FIA Formula One World Championship; 2016 season	Next race: 2016 United States Grand Prix
Previous race: 2015 Japanese Grand Prix	Japanese Grand Prix	Next race: 2017 Japanese Grand Prix
