= 2017 United States Grand Prix =

Race 17 of 20 in the 2017 Formula One World Championship
← Previous race	Next race →
- Layout of the Circuit of the Americas

Race details
- Date: October 22, 2017
- Official name: 2017 Formula 1 United States Grand Prix
- Location: Circuit of the Americas, Austin, Texas, United States
- Course: Permanent racing facility
- Course length: 5.513 km (3.426 miles)
- Distance: 56 laps, 308.405 km (191.634 miles)
- Weather: Sunny with temperatures reaching up to 82.9 °F (28.3 °C); wind speeds approaching speeds of 13.8 miles per hour (22.2 km/h)
- Attendance: 258,000

Pole position
Driver	(United Kingdom) Lewis Hamilton	Mercedes
- Time: 1:33.108

Fastest lap
Driver	(Germany) Sebastian Vettel	Ferrari
- Time: 1:37.766 on lap 51

Podium
First	(United Kingdom) Lewis Hamilton	Mercedes
Second	(Germany) Sebastian Vettel	Ferrari
Third	(Finland) Kimi Räikkönen	Ferrari

The 2017 United States Grand Prix (formally known as the 2017 Formula 1 United States Grand Prix) was a Formula One motor race held on October 22, 2017, at the Circuit of the Americas in Austin, Texas, United States as the seventeenth round of the 2017 FIA Formula One World Championship. The race marked the forty-seventh running of the United States Grand Prix, the thirty-ninth time that the race was run as a World Championship event since the inaugural season in 1950, and the sixth time that a World Championship round was held at the Circuit of the Americas in Austin, Texas.

Mercedes driver Lewis Hamilton entered the round with a 59-point lead over Ferrari's Sebastian Vettel in the World Drivers' Championship. Hamilton's teammate Valtteri Bottas was third, a further 13 points behind. In the World Constructors' Championship, Mercedes held a lead of 155 points over Ferrari, with Red Bull Racing a further 92 points behind in third place.

Mercedes clinched its fourth successive World Constructors' Championship after Hamilton won and Bottas finished 5th.

== Background ==
=== Driver changes ===
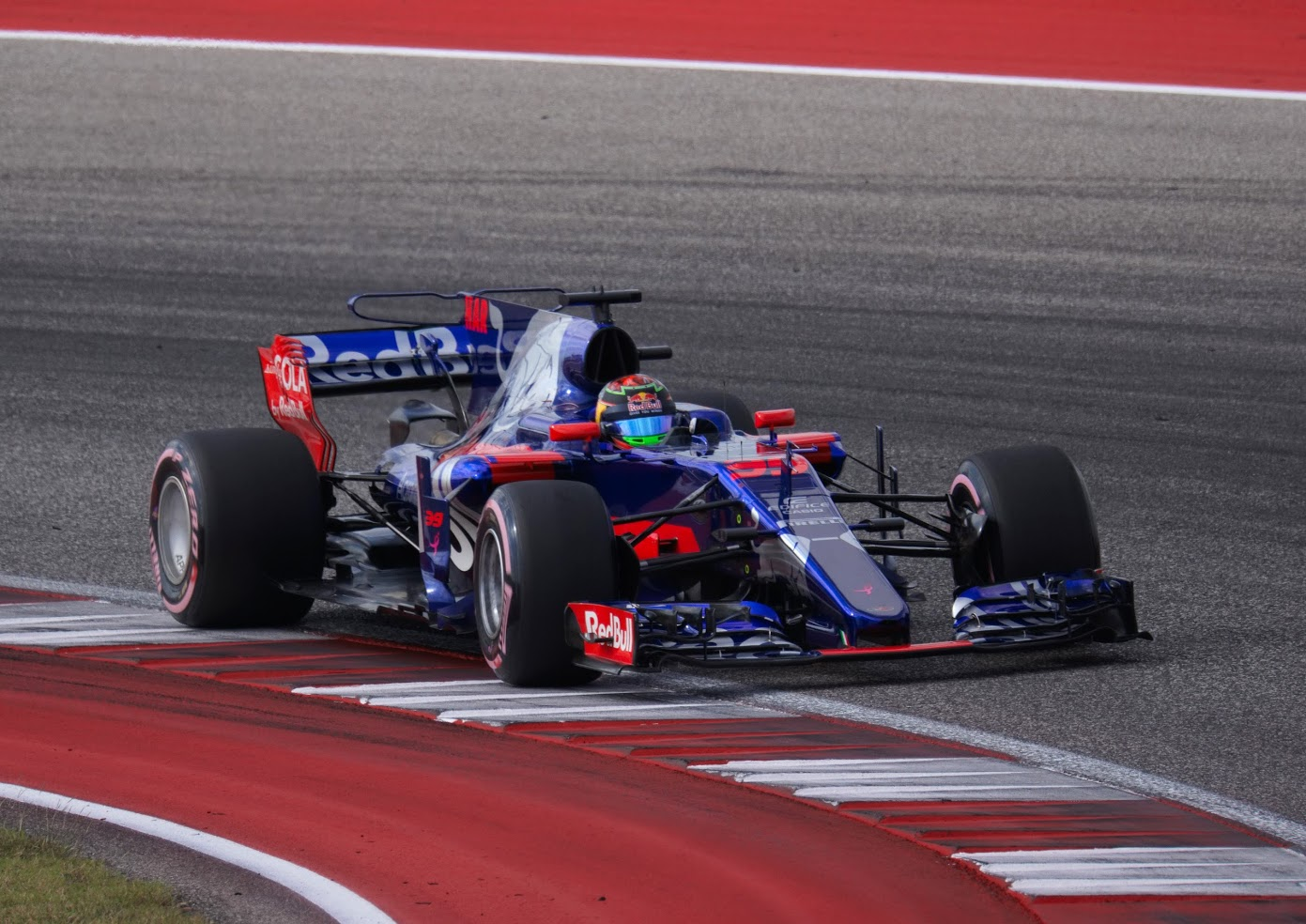
Brendon Hartley made his Formula One debut with Scuderia Toro Rosso.

Carlos Sainz Jr. moved from Toro Rosso to Renault and replaced Jolyon Palmer. Daniil Kvyat returned to Toro Rosso after having missed the Malaysian and Japanese Grands Prix, taking over Sainz's car. (Note: Daniil Kvyat drove the car that Carlos Sainz Jr. had previously competed in rather than the car he had driven in the first fourteen rounds of the championship.) Pierre Gasly missed the round to compete in the final weekend of the 2017 Super Formula Championship and was replaced at Toro Rosso by the 2015 World Endurance Champion Brendon Hartley, who made his Formula One début; this was the first time a New Zealander participated in a Formula One race in 33 years.

=== Tyres ===
Tyre supplier Pirelli provided teams with the ultra-soft, super-soft and soft compounds of tyre. The purple branding on the ultra-soft compound was replaced by pink for the race to raise awareness of breast cancer. Several teams also incorporated pink into their liveries to support the cause (except Force India, whose cars were pink to begin with).

== Qualifying ==
Pos.	Car no.	Driver	Constructor	Qualifying times			Final grid
Pos.	Car no.	Driver	Constructor	Q1	Q2	Q3	Final grid
1	44	(United Kingdom) Lewis Hamilton	Mercedes	1:34.822	1:33.437	1:33.108	1
2	5	(Germany) Sebastian Vettel	Ferrari	1:35.420	1:34.103	1:33.347	2
3	77	(Finland) Valtteri Bottas	Mercedes	1:35.309	1:33.769	1:33.568	3
4	3	(Australia) Daniel Ricciardo	Red Bull Racing-TAG Heuer	1:35.991	1:34.495	1:33.577^{1}	4
5	7	(Finland) Kimi Räikkönen	Ferrari	1:35.649	1:33.840	1:33.577^{1}	5
6	33	(Netherlands) Max Verstappen	Red Bull Racing-TAG Heuer	1:34.899	1:34.716	1:33.658	16^{2}
7	31	(France) Esteban Ocon	Force India-Mercedes	1:35.849	1:35.113	1:34.647	6
8	55	(Spain) Carlos Sainz Jr.	Renault	1:35.517	1:34.899	1:34.852	7
9	14	(Spain) Fernando Alonso	McLaren-Honda	1:35.712	1:35.046	1:35.007	8
10	11	(Mexico) Sergio Pérez	Force India-Mercedes	1:36.358	1:34.789	1:35.148	9
11	19	(Brazil) Felipe Massa	Williams-Mercedes	1:35.603	1:35.155		10
12	26	(Russia) Daniil Kvyat	Toro Rosso	1:36.073	1:35.529		11
13	2	(Belgium) Stoffel Vandoorne	McLaren-Honda	1:36.286	1:35.641		20^{3}
14	8	(France) Romain Grosjean	Haas-Ferrari	1:36.835	1:35.870		12
15	27	(Germany) Nico Hülkenberg	Renault	1:35.740	No time		18^{4}
16	9	(Sweden) Marcus Ericsson	Sauber-Ferrari	1:36.842			13
17	18	(Canada) Lance Stroll	Williams-Mercedes	1:36.868			15^{5}
18	39	(New Zealand) Brendon Hartley	Toro Rosso	1:36.889			19^{6}
19	94	(Germany) Pascal Wehrlein	Sauber-Ferrari	1:37.179			14
20	20	(Denmark) Kevin Magnussen	Haas-Ferrari	1:37.394			17^{7}
107% time: 1:41.459

Notes

- ^1 – Daniel Ricciardo and Kimi Räikkönen set identical lap times in Q3. As Ricciardo was the first to set his time, he was considered to have qualified ahead of Räikkönen.
- ^2 – Max Verstappen received a 15-place grid penalty for exceeding his quota of power unit components.
- ^3 – Stoffel Vandoorne received a 30-place grid penalty for exceeding his quota of power unit components.
- ^4 – Nico Hülkenberg received a 20-place grid penalty for exceeding his quota of power unit components.
- ^5 – Lance Stroll received a 3-place grid penalty for impeding Romain Grosjean during qualifying.
- ^6 – Brendon Hartley received a 25-place grid penalty for exceeding his car's quota of power unit components. (Note: Although Brendon Hartley made his Formula One début in the race, he received a grid penalty because power unit components are assigned to the car rather than the driver. Hartley thus received the penalty because the car's previous drivers, Daniil Kvyat and Pierre Gasly, had used up the quota of power unit components.)
- ^7 – Kevin Magnussen received a 3-place grid penalty for impeding Sergio Pérez during qualifying.

== Race ==
Lewis Hamilton won after passing title rival Sebastian Vettel early on in the race with the German driver coming home second, Hamilton extended his Championship lead in the process to 66 points. Kimi Räikkönen was third, Max Verstappen did overtake Räikkönen on the final lap, although Verstappen was found to have cut the corner, resulting in a time penalty.

=== Race classification ===
Pos.	No.	Driver	Constructor	Laps	Time/Retired	Grid	Points
1	44	(United Kingdom) Lewis Hamilton	Mercedes	56	1:33:50.991	1	25
2	5	(Germany) Sebastian Vettel	Ferrari	56	+10.143	2	18
3	7	(Finland) Kimi Räikkönen	Ferrari	56	+15.779	5	15
4	33	(Netherlands) Max Verstappen	Red Bull Racing-TAG Heuer	56	+16.768^{1}	16	12
5	77	(Finland) Valtteri Bottas	Mercedes	56	+34.967	3	10
6	31	(France) Esteban Ocon	Force India-Mercedes	56	+1:30.980	6	8
7	55	(Spain) Carlos Sainz Jr.	Renault	56	+1:32.944	7	6
8	11	(Mexico) Sergio Pérez	Force India-Mercedes	55	+1 Lap	9	4
9	19	(Brazil) Felipe Massa	Williams-Mercedes	55	+1 Lap	10	2
10	26	(Russia) Daniil Kvyat	Toro Rosso	55	+1 Lap	11	1
11	18	(Canada) Lance Stroll	Williams-Mercedes	55	+1 Lap	15	
12	2	(Belgium) Stoffel Vandoorne	McLaren-Honda	55	+1 Lap	20	
13	39	(New Zealand) Brendon Hartley	Toro Rosso	55	+1 Lap	19	
14	8	(France) Romain Grosjean	Haas-Ferrari	55	+1 Lap	12	
15	9	(Sweden) Marcus Ericsson	Sauber-Ferrari	55	+1 Lap^{2}	13	
16	20	(Denmark) Kevin Magnussen	Haas-Ferrari	55	+1 Lap	17	
Ret	14	(Spain) Fernando Alonso	McLaren-Honda	24	Engine	8	
Ret	3	(Australia) Daniel Ricciardo	Red Bull Racing-TAG Heuer	14	Engine	4	
Ret	94	(Germany) Pascal Wehrlein	Sauber-Ferrari	5	Collision damage	14	
Ret	27	(Germany) Nico Hülkenberg	Renault	3	Engine	18	

Notes

- ^1 – Max Verstappen originally finished third, but received a 5-second time penalty for leaving the track and gaining an advantage.
- ^2 – Marcus Ericsson received a 5-second time penalty for causing a collision.

== Championship standings after the race ==
Drivers' Championship standings

Pos.	Driver	Points
1	(United Kingdom) **Lewis Hamilton***	331
2	(Germany) **Sebastian Vettel***	265
3	(Finland) Valtteri Bottas	244
4	(Australia) Daniel Ricciardo	192
5	(Finland) Kimi Räikkönen	163

Constructors' Championship standings

Pos.	Constructor	Points
1	(Germany) **Mercedes**	575
2	(Italy) Ferrari	428
3	(Austria) Red Bull Racing-TAG Heuer	315
4	Force India-Mercedes	159
5	(United Kingdom) Williams-Mercedes	68

- Note: Only the top five positions are included for the sets of standings.
- **Bold text** indicates 2017 World Constructors' Champions.
- **Bold text** and an asterisk indicates competitors who still had a theoretical chance of becoming World Champion.

== Notes ==
Previous race: 2017 Japanese Grand Prix	FIA Formula One World Championship; 2017 season	Next race: 2017 Mexican Grand Prix
Previous race: 2016 United States Grand Prix	United States Grand Prix	Next race: 2018 United States Grand Prix
