= 2016 United States Grand Prix =

Race 18 of 21 in the 2016 Formula One World Championship
← Previous race	Next race →
- Layout of the Circuit of the Americas

Race details
- Date: October 23, 2016
- Official name: 2016 Formula 1 United States Grand Prix
- Location: Circuit of the Americas, Austin, Texas, United States
- Course: Permanent racing facility
- Course length: 5.513 km (3.426 miles)
- Distance: 56 laps, 308.405 km (191.634 miles)
- Weather: Sunny and hot with temperatures reaching up to 84 °F (29 °C); wind speeds approaching speeds of 9.2 miles per hour (14.8 km/h)
- Attendance: 269,889 (Weekend)

Pole position
Driver	(United Kingdom) Lewis Hamilton	Mercedes
- Time: 1.34.999

Fastest lap
Driver	(Germany) Sebastian Vettel	Ferrari
- Time: 1:39.877 on lap 55

Podium
First	(United Kingdom) Lewis Hamilton	Mercedes
Second	(Germany) Nico Rosberg	Mercedes
Third	(Australia) Daniel Ricciardo	Red Bull Racing-TAG Heuer

The 2016 United States Grand Prix (formally known as the 2016 Formula 1 United States Grand Prix) was a Formula One motor race held on October 23, 2016 at the Circuit of the Americas in Austin, Texas, United States. The race marked the forty-sixth running of the United States Grand Prix, and the thirty-eighth time that the race has been run as a World Championship event since the inaugural season in 1950.

Mercedes driver Nico Rosberg entered the round with a thirty-three-point lead over teammate Lewis Hamilton in the World Drivers' Championship. Mercedes team held an unassailable 208-point lead over Red Bull Racing in the World Constructors' Championship, having secured the Constructors' title in the previous race in Japan. This was also the last time the 2009 World Champion Jenson Button scored points in a Formula One Grand Prix. This was also the first United States Grand Prix to feature a US-owned Formula One team since 2004 when Ford-owned Jaguar raced at Indianapolis Motor Speedway roval layout despite Jaguar being a British-licensed team.

== Report ==
=== Race ===
The race started off well for Hamilton, leading on the run up to Turn 1, with Jenson Button and a Toro Rosso running wide out of the first corner. Daniel Ricciardo slotted into second while Hamilton's teammate and closest championship rival Nico Rosberg fell back to third. Valtteri Bottas suffered a puncture and had to pit after the first lap. Nico Hülkenberg retired on lap 7 due to earlier collision damage. On the corner before the backstraight DRS zone, Esteban Gutiérrez of the Haas F1 Team locked up the front right tyre heavily and retired subsequently due to brake problems. On lap 31, Max Verstappen retired due to a gearbox problem and stopped out of the first DRS zone, triggering a Virtual Safety Car period. Kimi Räikkönen retired after coming out of the pit lane during a routine stop with a loose wheel. Hamilton went on to win his 5th race in the United States, with Nico Rosberg in second and Daniel Ricciardo rounding out the podium spots. Hamilton reduced Rosberg's lead in the Drivers' Championship to 26 points with 3 races left in the season.

== Classification ==
=== Qualifying ===
Pos.	Car no.	Driver	Constructor	Qualifying times			Final grid
Pos.	Car no.	Driver	Constructor	Q1	Q2	Q3	Final grid
1	44	(United Kingdom) Lewis Hamilton	Mercedes	1:36.296	1:36.450	1:34.999	1
2	6	(Germany) Nico Rosberg	Mercedes	1:36.397	1:36.351	1:35.215	2
3	3	(Australia) Daniel Ricciardo	Red Bull Racing-TAG Heuer	1:36.759	1:36.255	1:35.509	3
4	33	(Netherlands) Max Verstappen	Red Bull Racing-TAG Heuer	1:36.613	1:36.857	1:35.747	4
5	7	(Finland) Kimi Räikkönen	Ferrari	1:36.985	1:36.584	1:36.131	5
6	5	(Germany) Sebastian Vettel	Ferrari	1:37.151	1:36.462	1:36.358	6
7	27	(Germany) Nico Hülkenberg	Force India-Mercedes	1:36.950	1:36.626	1:36.628	7
8	77	(Finland) Valtteri Bottas	Williams-Mercedes	1:37.456	1:37.202	1:37.116	8
9	19	(Brazil) Felipe Massa	Williams-Mercedes	1:37.402	1:37.214	1:37.269	9
10	55	(Spain) Carlos Sainz Jr.	Toro Rosso-Ferrari	1:37.744	1:37.175	1:37.326	10
11	11	(Mexico) Sergio Pérez	Force India-Mercedes	1:37.345	1:37.353		11
12	14	(Spain) Fernando Alonso	McLaren-Honda	1:37.913	1:37.417		12
13	26	(Russia) Daniil Kvyat	Toro Rosso-Ferrari	1:37.844	1:37.480		13
14	21	(Mexico) Esteban Gutiérrez	Haas-Ferrari	1:38.053	1:37.773		14
15	30	(United Kingdom) Jolyon Palmer	Renault	1:38.084	1:37.935		15
16	9	(Sweden) Marcus Ericsson	Sauber-Ferrari	1:38.040	1:39.356		16
17	8	(France) Romain Grosjean	Haas-Ferrari	1:38.308			17
18	20	(Denmark) Kevin Magnussen	Renault	1:38.317			18
19	22	(United Kingdom) Jenson Button	McLaren-Honda	1:38.327			19
20	94	(Germany) Pascal Wehrlein	MRT-Mercedes	1:38.548			20
21	12	(Brazil) Felipe Nasr	Sauber-Ferrari	1:38.583			21
22	31	(France) Esteban Ocon	MRT-Mercedes	1:38.806			22
107% time: 1:43.036

=== Race ===
Pos.	No.	Driver	Constructor	Laps	Time/Retired	Grid	Points
1	44	(United Kingdom) Lewis Hamilton	Mercedes	56	1:38:12.618	1	25
2	6	(Germany) Nico Rosberg	Mercedes	56	+4.520	2	18
3	3	(Australia) Daniel Ricciardo	Red Bull Racing-TAG Heuer	56	+19.692	3	15
4	5	(Germany) Sebastian Vettel	Ferrari	56	+43.134	6	12
5	14	(Spain) Fernando Alonso	McLaren-Honda	56	+1:33.953	12	10
6	55	(Spain) Carlos Sainz Jr.	Toro Rosso-Ferrari	56	+1:36.124	10	8
7	19	(Brazil) Felipe Massa	Williams-Mercedes	55	+1 Lap	9	6
8	11	(Mexico) Sergio Pérez	Force India-Mercedes	55	+1 Lap	11	4
9	22	(United Kingdom) Jenson Button	McLaren-Honda	55	+1 Lap	19	2
10	8	(France) Romain Grosjean	Haas-Ferrari	55	+1 Lap	17	1
11	26	(Russia) Daniil Kvyat	Toro Rosso-Ferrari	55	+1 Lap	13	
12	20	(Denmark) Kevin Magnussen	Renault	55	+1 Lap^{1}	18	
13	30	(United Kingdom) Jolyon Palmer	Renault	55	+1 Lap	15	
14	9	(Sweden) Marcus Ericsson	Sauber-Ferrari	55	+1 Lap	16	
15	12	(Brazil) Felipe Nasr	Sauber-Ferrari	55	+1 Lap	21	
16	77	(Finland) Valtteri Bottas	Williams-Mercedes	55	+1 Lap	8	
17	94	(Germany) Pascal Wehrlein	MRT-Mercedes	55	+1 Lap	20	
18	31	(France) Esteban Ocon	MRT-Mercedes	54	+2 Laps	22	
Ret	7	(Finland) Kimi Räikkönen	Ferrari	38	Loose wheel	5	
Ret	33	(Netherlands) Max Verstappen	Red Bull Racing-TAG Heuer	28	Gearbox	4	
Ret	21	(Mexico) Esteban Gutiérrez	Haas-Ferrari	16	Brakes	14	
Ret	27	(Germany) Nico Hülkenberg	Force India-Mercedes	1	Collision damage	7	

Notes

- ^1 – Kevin Magnussen received a five-second penalty after the race for an illegal overtake on Daniil Kvyat.

== Championship standings after the race ==
Drivers' Championship standings

	Pos.	Driver	Points
	1	(Germany) **Nico Rosberg***	331
	2	(United Kingdom) **Lewis Hamilton***	305
	3	(Australia) Daniel Ricciardo	227
2	4	(Germany) Sebastian Vettel	177
1	5	(Finland) Kimi Räikkönen	170

Constructors' Championship standings

Pos.	Constructor	Points
1	(Germany) **Mercedes**	636
2	(Austria) Red Bull Racing-TAG Heuer	400
3	(Italy) Ferrari	347
4	Force India-Mercedes	138
5	(United Kingdom) Williams-Mercedes	130

- Note: Only the top five positions are included for the sets of standings.
- **Bold text** indicates the 2016 World Constructors' Champions.
- Competitors in bold and marked with an asterisk still had a mathematical chance of becoming World Champion.

Previous race: 2016 Japanese Grand Prix	FIA Formula One World Championship; 2016 season	Next race: 2016 Mexican Grand Prix
Previous race: 2015 United States Grand Prix	United States Grand Prix	Next race: 2017 United States Grand Prix
