= 2017 Japanese Grand Prix =

Race 16 of 20 in the 2017 Formula One World Championship
← Previous race	Next race →
- Layout of the Suzuka International Racing Course

Race details
- Date: 8 October 2017
- Official name: 2017 Formula 1 Japanese Grand Prix
- Location: Suzuka International Racing Course, Suzuka, Mie Prefecture, Japan
- Course: Permanent racing facility
- Course length: 5.807 km (3.608 miles)
- Distance: 53 laps, 307.471 km (191.054 miles)
- Weather: Sunny
- Attendance: 137,000

Pole position
Driver	(United Kingdom) Lewis Hamilton	Mercedes
- Time: 1:27.319

Fastest lap
Driver	(Finland) Valtteri Bottas	Mercedes
- Time: 1:33.144 on lap 50

Podium
First	(United Kingdom) Lewis Hamilton	Mercedes
Second	(Netherlands) Max Verstappen	Red Bull Racing-TAG Heuer
Third	(Australia) Daniel Ricciardo	Red Bull Racing-TAG Heuer

The 2017 Japanese Grand Prix (formally known as the 2017 Formula 1 Japanese Grand Prix) was a Formula One motor race held on 8 October 2017 at the Suzuka International Racing Course in Suzuka in the Mie Prefecture, Japan. The race was the sixteenth round of the 2017 FIA Formula One World Championship and marked the forty-third running of the Japanese Grand Prix. The 2017 event was the thirty-third time that the race has been run as a World Championship event since the inaugural season in 1950, and the twenty-ninth time that a World Championship round had been held at Suzuka. This would also prove to be the last Grand Prix for Jolyon Palmer, as he was replaced by Carlos Sainz Jr. for the rest of the 2017 season. Sainz contested his last race for Toro Rosso before replacing Palmer at Renault.

Mercedes driver Lewis Hamilton entered the round with a thirty-four-point lead over Ferrari's Sebastian Vettel in the World Drivers' Championship. Hamilton's teammate Valtteri Bottas sat third, a further twenty-five points behind. In the World Constructors' Championship, Mercedes held a lead of one hundred and eighteen points over Ferrari, with Red Bull Racing a further one hundred and fifteen points behind in third place.

== Qualifying ==
Pos.	Car no.	Driver	Constructor	Qualifying times			Final grid
Pos.	Car no.	Driver	Constructor	Q1	Q2	Q3	Final grid
1	44	(United Kingdom) Lewis Hamilton	Mercedes	1:29.047	1:27.819	1:27.319	1
2	77	(Finland) Valtteri Bottas	Mercedes	1:29.332	1:28.543	1:27.651	6^{1}
3	5	(Germany) Sebastian Vettel	Ferrari	1:29.352	1:28.225	1:27.791	2
4	3	(Australia) Daniel Ricciardo	Red Bull Racing-TAG Heuer	1:29.475	1:28.935	1:28.306	3
5	33	(Netherlands) Max Verstappen	Red Bull Racing-TAG Heuer	1:29.181	1:28.747	1:28.332	4
6	7	(Finland) Kimi Räikkönen	Ferrari	1:29.163	1:29.079	1:28.498	10^{1}
7	31	(France) Esteban Ocon	Force India-Mercedes	1:30.115	1:29.199	1:29.111	5
8	11	(Mexico) Sergio Pérez	Force India-Mercedes	1:29.696	1:29.343	1:29.260	7
9	19	(Brazil) Felipe Massa	Williams-Mercedes	1:30.352	1:29.687	1:29.480	8
10	14	(Spain) Fernando Alonso	McLaren-Honda	1:30.525	1:29.749	1:30.687	20^{2}
11	2	(Belgium) Stoffel Vandoorne	McLaren-Honda	1:30.654	1:29.778		9
12	27	(Germany) Nico Hülkenberg	Renault	1:30.252	1:29.879		11
13	20	(Denmark) Kevin Magnussen	Haas-Ferrari	1:30.774	1:29.972		12
14	30	(United Kingdom) Jolyon Palmer	Renault	1:30.516	1:30.022		18^{2}
15	55	(Spain) Carlos Sainz Jr.	Toro Rosso	1:30.565	1:30.413		19^{2}
16	8	(France) Romain Grosjean	Haas-Ferrari	1:30.849			13
17	10	(France) Pierre Gasly	Toro Rosso	1:31.317			14
18	18	(Canada) Lance Stroll	Williams-Mercedes	1:31.409			15
19	9	(Sweden) Marcus Ericsson	Sauber-Ferrari	1:31.597			16
20	94	(Germany) Pascal Wehrlein	Sauber-Ferrari	1:31.885			17
107% time: 1:35.280

Notes

- ^1 – Valtteri Bottas and Kimi Räikkönen received a 5-place grid penalty for an unscheduled gearbox change.
- ^2 – Fernando Alonso received a 35-place grid penalty and both Jolyon Palmer and Carlos Sainz Jr. received a 20-place grid penalty, all for exceeding their respective quota of power unit components.

== Race ==
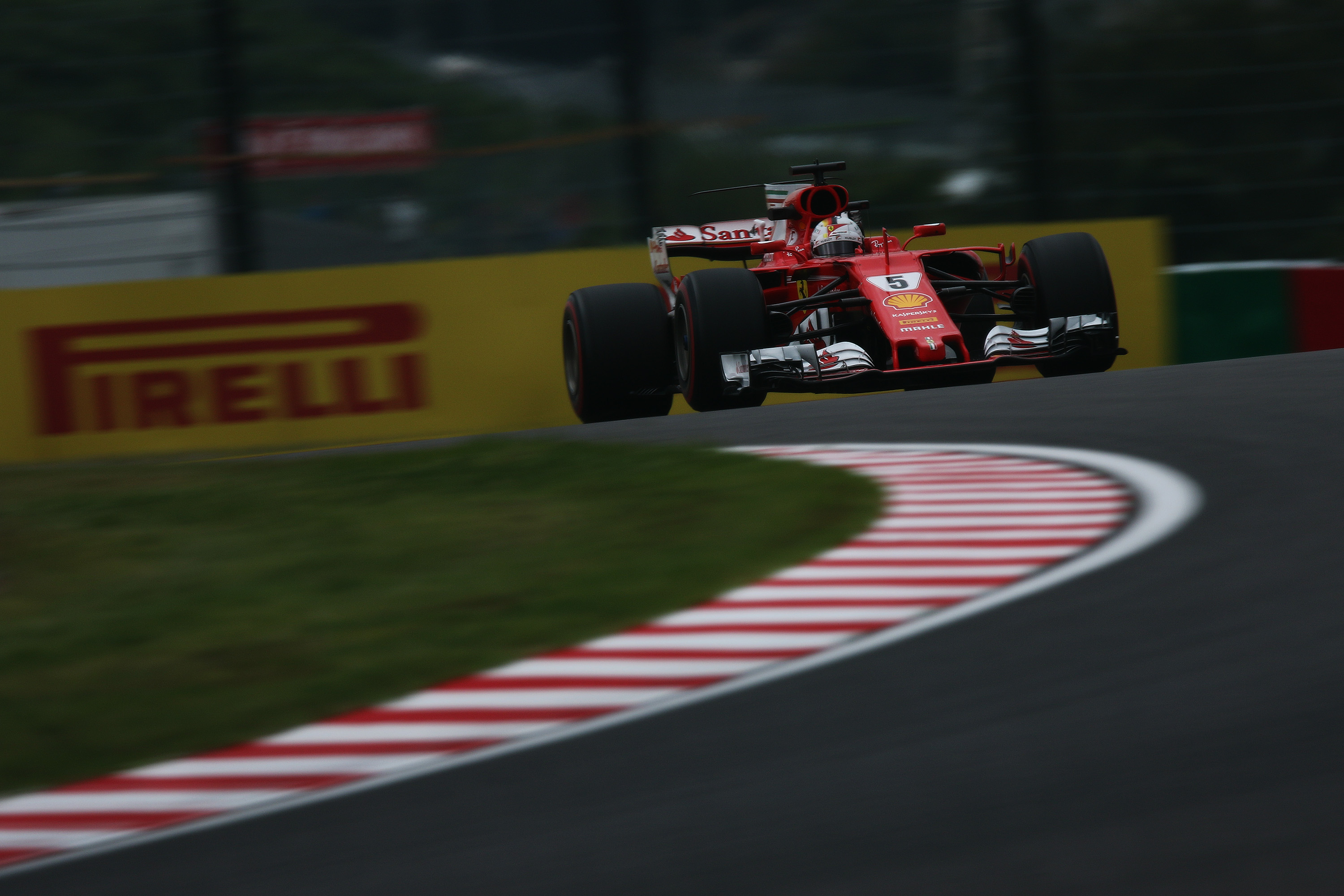
Sebastian Vettel suffered technical problems a few minutes before the race start and retired on the fourth lap.

Before the race started Sebastian Vettel's mechanics were working on his car. When the race started it was clear he had some serious issues with the car losing positions immediately as Lewis Hamilton led away. Carlos Sainz had an accident on the opening lap, with the safety car being deployed. Soon after the race restarted Vettel retired with engine problems. Hamilton took the victory, followed home closely by Max Verstappen with his teammate Daniel Ricciardo finishing 3rd, Valtteri Bottas was fourth and Kimi Räikkönen fifth.

=== Race classification ===
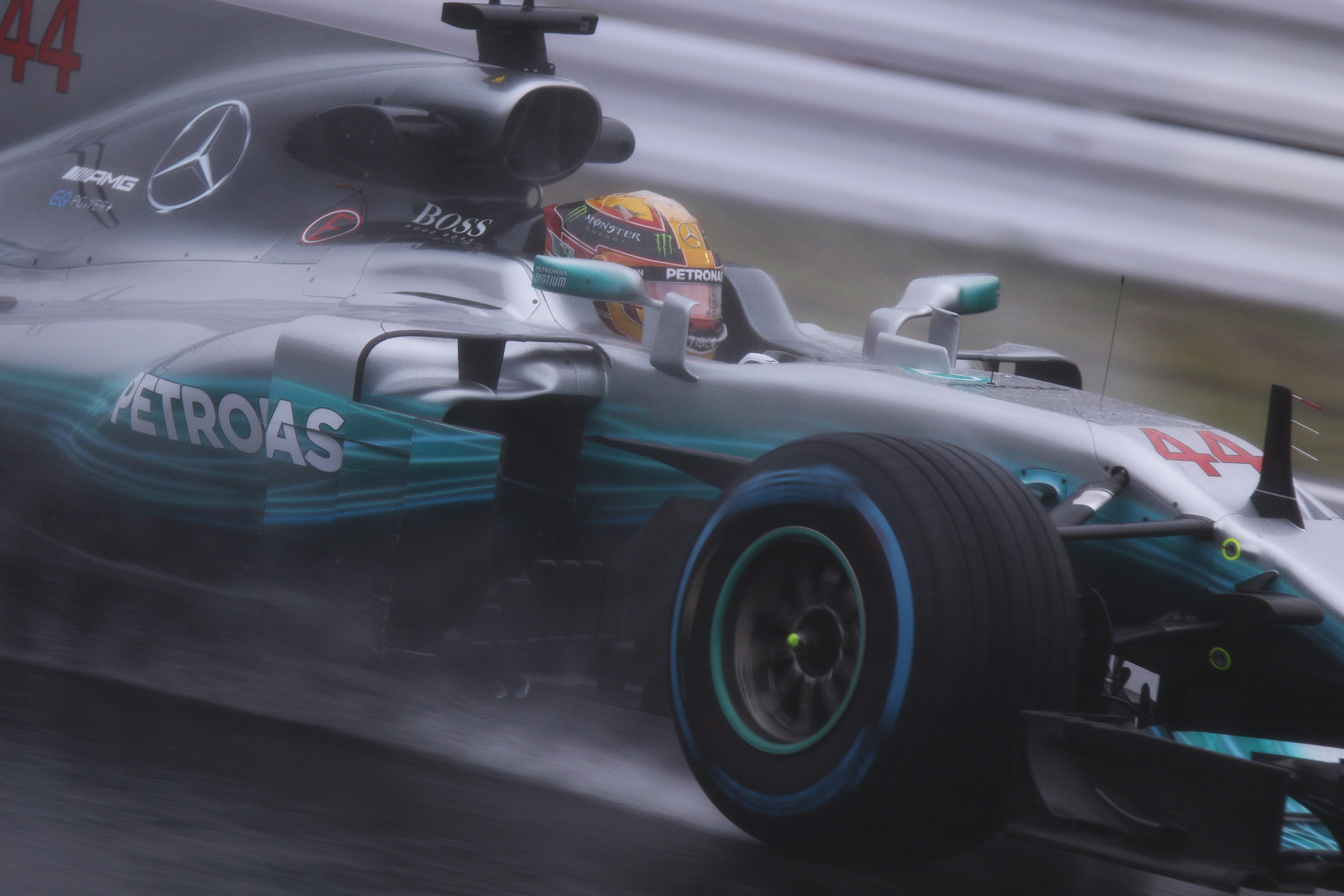
Lewis Hamilton (pictured during practice) won the race.

Pos.	No.	Driver	Constructor	Laps	Time/Retired	Grid	Points
1	44	(United Kingdom) Lewis Hamilton	Mercedes	53	1:27:31.194	1	25
2	33	(Netherlands) Max Verstappen	Red Bull Racing-TAG Heuer	53	+1.211	4	18
3	3	(Australia) Daniel Ricciardo	Red Bull Racing-TAG Heuer	53	+9.679	3	15
4	77	(Finland) Valtteri Bottas	Mercedes	53	+10.580	6	12
5	7	(Finland) Kimi Räikkönen	Ferrari	53	+32.622	10	10
6	31	(France) Esteban Ocon	Force India-Mercedes	53	+1:07.788	5	8
7	11	(Mexico) Sergio Pérez	Force India-Mercedes	53	+1:11.424	7	6
8	20	(Denmark) Kevin Magnussen	Haas-Ferrari	53	+1:28.953	12	4
9	8	(France) Romain Grosjean	Haas-Ferrari	53	+1:29.883	13	2
10	19	(Brazil) Felipe Massa	Williams-Mercedes	52	+1 Lap	8	1
11	14	(Spain) Fernando Alonso	McLaren-Honda	52	+1 Lap	20	
12	30	(United Kingdom) Jolyon Palmer	Renault	52	+1 Lap	18	
13	10	(France) Pierre Gasly	Toro Rosso	52	+1 Lap	14	
14	2	(Belgium) Stoffel Vandoorne	McLaren-Honda	52	+1 Lap	9	
15	94	(Germany) Pascal Wehrlein	Sauber-Ferrari	51	+2 Laps	17	
Ret	18	(Canada) Lance Stroll	Williams-Mercedes	45	Suspension	15	
Ret	27	(Germany) Nico Hülkenberg	Renault	40	Rear wing	11	
Ret	9	(Sweden) Marcus Ericsson	Sauber-Ferrari	7	Accident	16	
Ret	5	(Germany) Sebastian Vettel	Ferrari	4	Spark plug	2	
Ret	55	(Spain) Carlos Sainz Jr.	Toro Rosso	0	Accident	19	

== Championship standings after the race ==
Drivers' Championship standings

Pos.	Driver	Points
1	(United Kingdom) Lewis Hamilton*	306
2	(Germany) Sebastian Vettel*	247
3	(Finland) Valtteri Bottas*	234
4	(Australia) Daniel Ricciardo	192
5	(Finland) Kimi Räikkönen	148

Constructors' Championship standings

Pos.	Constructor	Points
1	(Germany) Mercedes*	540
2	(Italy) Ferrari*	395
3	(Austria) Red Bull Racing-TAG Heuer	303
4	Force India-Mercedes	147
5	(United Kingdom) Williams-Mercedes	66

- Note: Only the top five positions are included for the sets of standings.
- Bold text and an asterisk indicates competitors who still had a theoretical chance of becoming World Champion.

Previous race: 2017 Malaysian Grand Prix	FIA Formula One World Championship; 2017 season	Next race: 2017 United States Grand Prix
Previous race: 2016 Japanese Grand Prix	Japanese Grand Prix	Next race: 2018 Japanese Grand Prix
