= 2023 Japanese Grand Prix =

Sixteenth round of the 2023 F1 season

Race 16 of 22 in the 2023 Formula One World Championship
← Previous race	Next race →
- Layout of the Suzuka International Racing Course

Race details
- Date: 24 September 2023
- Official name: Formula 1 Lenovo Japanese Grand Prix 2023
- Location: Suzuka International Racing Course; Suzuka, Mie Prefecture, Japan
- Course: Permanent racing facility
- Course length: 5.807 km (3.608 miles)
- Distance: 53 laps, 307.471 km (191.054 miles)
- Weather: Sunny
- Attendance: 222,000

Pole position
Driver	(Netherlands) Max Verstappen	Red Bull Racing-Honda RBPT
- Time: 1:28.877

Fastest lap
Driver	(Netherlands) Max Verstappen	Red Bull Racing-Honda RBPT
- Time: 1:34.183 on lap 39

Podium
First	(Netherlands) Max Verstappen	Red Bull Racing-Honda RBPT
Second	(United Kingdom) Lando Norris	McLaren-Mercedes
Third	(Australia) Oscar Piastri	McLaren-Mercedes

The 2023 Japanese Grand Prix (officially known as the Formula 1 Lenovo Japanese Grand Prix 2023) was a Formula One motor race held on 24 September 2023 at the Suzuka International Racing Course in Suzuka, Japan. It was the sixteenth round of the 2023 Formula One World Championship.

Max Verstappen started from pole position, set the fastest lap and won the race for Red Bull Racing, allowing the Austrian constructor to win their sixth Constructors' Championship, their second consecutive win after 2022. Mathematically, the team also effectively secured the Drivers' Championship, with Verstappen securing the championship at the Qatar Grand Prix sprint event. At that point, Sergio Pérez remained in the title contest behind Verstappen. Additionally, Lando Norris and Oscar Piastri both finished on the podium for McLaren, marking the team's first double podium since the 2021 Italian Grand Prix and Piastri's first career podium.

== Background ==
The event was held across the weekend of 22–24 September. It was the sixteenth round of the 2023 Formula One World Championship and the 48th running of the Japanese Grand Prix.

=== Championship standings before the race ===
Coming into the weekend, Max Verstappen led the Drivers' Championship by 151 points from teammate Sergio Pérez, with Lewis Hamilton third, a further 43 points behind. Red Bull Racing led the Constructors' Championship from Mercedes by 308 points and Ferrari by a further 24 points.

The World Constructors' Championship leader Red Bull Racing had an opportunity to secure their sixth title, their second in a row. Red Bull Racing would win the title as long as they outscored Mercedes by one point and Ferrari did not outscore them by 24 points. Red Bull Racing would win the title as their advantage would be the same as the number of the obtainable points remaining in the season (309), but Mercedes would not be able to win on a tie breaker due to Red Bull Racing achieving more wins than Mercedes.

=== Entrants ===
The drivers and teams were the same as the season entry list, with the exception of Liam Lawson, who was in the seat originally held by Nyck de Vries. (Note: Nyck de Vries was originally replaced by Daniel Ricciardo from the Hungarian Grand Prix onwards. Ricciardo was subsequently replaced by Liam Lawson whilst Ricciardo recovered from a broken metacarpal bone which he suffered following a crash during the second practice of the Dutch Grand Prix.)

=== Tyre choices ===
Tyre supplier Pirelli brought the C1, C2 and C3 tyre compounds (designated hard, medium, and soft, respectively) for teams to use at the event.

== Practice ==
Three free practice sessions were held for the event. The first practice session was held on 22 September 2023, at 11:30 local time (UTC+9). Max Verstappen topped the session, with Carlos Sainz Jr. recording the second-fastest time and Lando Norris recording the third-fastest.

The second practice session was held on 22 September 2023, at 15:00 local time (UTC+9). Verstappen topped the session, with Charles Leclerc recording the second-fastest time and Norris recording the third-fastest. The session was red-flagged with two minutes before the end and was never resumed due to Pierre Gasly's crash. The third practice session was held on 23 September 2023, at 11:30 local time (UTC+9). Verstappen topped the session once more, with Norris recording the second-fastest time and his teammate Oscar Piastri the third-fastest.

== Qualifying ==
Qualifying was held on 23 September 2023, at 15:00 local time (UTC+9).

=== Qualifying report ===
During the first segment, Logan Sargeant took his Williams to the walls, bringing out the red flag and taking himself out of the session. Valtteri Bottas, Lance Stroll, Nico Hülkenberg, and Zhou Guanyu were also knocked out. During the second segment, Liam Lawson, Pierre Gasly, Alexander Albon, Esteban Ocon and Kevin Magnussen were all knocked out while Charles Leclerc topped the session. During the third segment, Verstappen set the fastest lap, granting him pole position, bettering his own time by over a tenth to secure it. Oscar Piastri and Lando Norris completed the top three.

=== Qualifying classification ===
Pos.	No.	Driver	Constructor	Qualifying times			Final grid
Pos.	No.	Driver	Constructor	Q1	Q2	Q3	Final grid
1	1	(Netherlands) Max Verstappen	Red Bull Racing-Honda RBPT	1:29.878	1:29.964	1:28.877	1
2	81	(Australia) Oscar Piastri	McLaren-Mercedes	1:30.439	1:30.122	1:29.458	2
3	4	(United Kingdom) Lando Norris	McLaren-Mercedes	1:30.063	1:30.296	1:29.493	3
4	16	(Monaco) Charles Leclerc	Ferrari	1:30.393	1:29.940	1:29.542	4
5	11	(Mexico) Sergio Pérez	Red Bull Racing-Honda RBPT	1:30.652	1:29.965	1:29.650	5
6	55	(Spain) Carlos Sainz Jr.	Ferrari	1:30.651	1:30.067	1:29.850	6
7	44	(United Kingdom) Lewis Hamilton	Mercedes	1:30.811	1:30.040	1:29.908	7
8	63	(United Kingdom) George Russell	Mercedes	1:30.811	1:30.268	1:30.219	8
9	22	(Japan) Yuki Tsunoda	AlphaTauri-Honda RBPT	1:30.733	1:30.204	1:30.303	9
10	14	(Spain) Fernando Alonso	Aston Martin Aramco-Mercedes	1:30.971	1:30.465	1:30.560	10
11	40	(New Zealand) Liam Lawson	AlphaTauri-Honda RBPT	1:30.425	1:30.508	N/A	11
12	10	(France) Pierre Gasly	Alpine-Renault	1:30.843	1:30.509	N/A	12
13	23	(Thailand) Alexander Albon	Williams-Mercedes	1:30.941	1:30.537	N/A	13
14	31	(France) Esteban Ocon	Alpine-Renault	1:30.960	1:30.586	N/A	14
15	20	(Denmark) Kevin Magnussen	Haas-Ferrari	1:30.976	1:30.665	N/A	15
16	77	(Finland) Valtteri Bottas	Alfa Romeo-Ferrari	1:31.049	N/A	N/A	16
17	18	(Canada) Lance Stroll	Aston Martin Aramco-Mercedes	1:31.181	N/A	N/A	17
18	27	(Germany) Nico Hülkenberg	Haas-Ferrari	1:31.299	N/A	N/A	18
19	24	(China) Zhou Guanyu	Alfa Romeo-Ferrari	1:31.398	N/A	N/A	19
107% time: 1:36.169
—	2	(United States) Logan Sargeant	Williams-Mercedes	No time	N/A	N/A	PL^{a}

Notes

- ^a – Logan Sargeant failed to set a time during qualifying. He was permitted to race at the stewards' discretion. He was then required to start the race from the pit lane as elements of different specifications from the ones originally used were installed on his car during parc fermé conditions. He also received a ten-second time penalty as his mechanics assembled a new chassis, this being considered a new car.

== Race ==
The race was held on 24 September 2023, at 14:00 local time (UTC+9).

=== Race report ===
Following his Q1 crash the previous day, Williams engineers rebuilt the car of Logan Sargeant. However, using too many new replacement parts not from the original ones meant the car was deemed to be a third car, and Logan was given a ten-second time penalty to serve during the race. He also was required to start from the pit lane due to changes being made in parc fermé.

As the race began, Oscar Piastri dropped to third with Lando Norris taking his position. Meanwhile, Valtteri Bottas hit the car of Alexander Albon, bringing out the safety car due to excessive on-track debris. Lewis Hamilton was forced onto the grass after trying to pass Sergio Pérez, whose car was damaged by the contact; the Red Bull Racing driver went into the pit lane and swapped his front wing, dropping back into the race in last place. Pérez also received a five-second penalty for infringing on safety car regulations. Albon took a new front wing.

In lap 5, Bottas was hit by a locked-up Sargeant and retired four laps later after complaining of his car's handling, resulting in another five-second penalty for Sargeant. Pérez would then hit Kevin Magnussen, at turn 11 on lap 12. Debris on the circuit from the incident led to the virtual safety car being briefly deployed on lap 14 in order to allow the marshals to remove the debris. Meanwhile, Lance Stroll entered the pits and did not come out, and was soon joined in retirement by Albon. Both Mercedes ran wide at Spoon Curve as George Russell attempted to overtake his teammate who subsequently pitted for fresh tyres. Russell would pit later, running a one-stop strategy. There was confusion about Pérez's retirement from the race; having hit Magnussen earlier, he went into the pit lane and appeared to have retired. Several laps later he rejoined the race, was immediately called to box and then served his penalty, in a tactic designed to ensure the unserved penalty was not carried over to the following Qatar Grand Prix in the form of a grid penalty. Once the penalty was served, Pérez retired once again.

At this point, polesitter Max Verstappen led the field with a dominant 16 seconds ahead of second-placed Norris. Behind, Piastri passed Russell for third place. Soon, Charles Leclerc passed Russell for fourth. Verstappen won the race 20 seconds ahead of Norris and Piastri, the latter winning his first career podium position. Through Verstappen, who also set the fastest lap, Red Bull Racing won their sixth Constructors' Championship, their second in a row. Norris and Piastri's podium finish marked McLaren's first double podium since the 2021 Italian Grand Prix and Piastri's first career podium position.

This race was the first of two events to feature a special trophy designed by Lenovo, the title sponsor of the race, in collaboration with Pininfarina, that lit up in the colours of the winning driver's flag when a special button on the backside of the trophy is kissed.

=== Race classification ===
Pos.	No.	Driver	Constructor	Laps	Time/Retired	Grid	Points
1	1	(Netherlands) Max Verstappen	Red Bull Racing-Honda RBPT	53	1:30:58.421	1	26^{a}
2	4	(United Kingdom) Lando Norris	McLaren-Mercedes	53	+19.387	3	18
3	81	(Australia) Oscar Piastri	McLaren-Mercedes	53	+36.494	2	15
4	16	(Monaco) Charles Leclerc	Ferrari	53	+43.998	4	12
5	44	(United Kingdom) Lewis Hamilton	Mercedes	53	+49.376	7	10
6	55	(Spain) Carlos Sainz Jr.	Ferrari	53	+50.221	6	8
7	63	(United Kingdom) George Russell	Mercedes	53	+57.659	8	6
8	14	(Spain) Fernando Alonso	Aston Martin Aramco-Mercedes	53	+1:14.725	10	4
9	31	(France) Esteban Ocon	Alpine-Renault	53	+1:19.678	14	2
10	10	(France) Pierre Gasly	Alpine-Renault	53	+1:23.155	12	1
11	40	(New Zealand) Liam Lawson	AlphaTauri-Honda RBPT	52	+1 lap	11	
12	22	(Japan) Yuki Tsunoda	AlphaTauri-Honda RBPT	52	+1 lap	9	
13	24	(China) Zhou Guanyu	Alfa Romeo-Ferrari	52	+1 lap	19	
14	27	(Germany) Nico Hülkenberg	Haas-Ferrari	52	+1 lap	18	
15	20	(Denmark) Kevin Magnussen	Haas-Ferrari	52	+1 lap	15	
Ret	23	(Thailand) Alexander Albon	Williams-Mercedes	26	Undertray	13	
Ret	2	(United States) Logan Sargeant	Williams-Mercedes	22	Undertray	PL	
Ret	18	(Canada) Lance Stroll	Aston Martin Aramco-Mercedes	20	Rear wing	17	
Ret	11	(Mexico) Sergio Pérez	Red Bull Racing-Honda RBPT	15	Withdrew	5	
Ret	77	(Finland) Valtteri Bottas	Alfa Romeo-Ferrari	7	Undertray	16	
Fastest lap: (Netherlands) Max Verstappen (Red Bull Racing-Honda RBPT) – 1:34.183 (lap 39)

Notes

- ^a – Includes one point for fastest lap.

== Championship standings after the race ==
Drivers' Championship standings

Pos.	Driver	Points
1	(Netherlands) **Max Verstappen***	400
2	(Mexico) **Sergio Pérez***	223
3	(United Kingdom) Lewis Hamilton	190
4	(Spain) Fernando Alonso	174
5	(Spain) Carlos Sainz Jr.	150

Constructors' Championship standings

Pos.	Constructor	Points
1	(Austria) **Red Bull Racing-Honda RBPT***	623
2	(Germany) Mercedes	305
3	(Italy) Ferrari	285
4	(United Kingdom) Aston Martin Aramco-Mercedes	221
5	(United Kingdom) McLaren-Mercedes	172

- Note: Only the top five positions are included for both sets of standings.
- Competitors in bold and marked with an asterisk are the 2023 World Champions.

== Notes ==
Previous race: 2023 Singapore Grand Prix	FIA Formula One World Championship; 2023 season	Next race: 2023 Qatar Grand Prix
Previous race: 2022 Japanese Grand Prix	Japanese Grand Prix	Next race: 2024 Japanese Grand Prix
