= 2018 Japanese Grand Prix =

17th round of the 2018 Formula One season

Race 17 of 21 in the 2018 Formula One World Championship
← Previous race	Next race →
- Layout of the Suzuka International Racing Course

Race details
- Date: 7 October 2018
- Official name: Formula 1 2018 Honda Japanese Grand Prix
- Location: Suzuka International Racing Course, Suzuka, Mie Prefecture, Japan
- Course: Permanent racing facility
- Course length: 5.807 km (3.608 miles)
- Distance: 53 laps, 307.471 km (191.054 miles)
- Weather: Partly cloudy
- Attendance: 165,000

Pole position
Driver	(United Kingdom) Lewis Hamilton	Mercedes
- Time: 1:27.760

Fastest lap
Driver	(Germany) Sebastian Vettel	Ferrari
- Time: 1:32.318 on lap 53

Podium
First	(United Kingdom) Lewis Hamilton	Mercedes
Second	(Finland) Valtteri Bottas	Mercedes
Third	(Netherlands) Max Verstappen	Red Bull Racing-TAG Heuer

The 2018 Japanese Grand Prix (formally known as the Formula 1 2018 Honda Japanese Grand Prix) was a Formula One racing event held on 7 October 2018 at the Suzuka International Racing Course in Suzuka in the Mie Prefecture, Japan. The race was the seventeenth round of the 2018 FIA Formula One World Championship and marked the 44th running of the Japanese Grand Prix. The 2018 event was the 34th time that the race had been run as a World Championship event since the inaugural season in 1950, and the 30th time that it had been held at Suzuka.

Mercedes driver Lewis Hamilton entered the round with a fifty-point lead over Ferrari's Sebastian Vettel in the World Drivers' Championship. Hamilton's team-mate Valtteri Bottas sat third, a further 67 points behind. In the World Constructors' Championship, Mercedes held a lead of fifty-three points over Ferrari, with Red Bull Racing a further one hundred and fifty points behind in third place.

== Report ==
=== Background ===
Ferrari introduced a new livery, carrying the logo of Mission Winnow, a joint promotion with major sponsor Philip Morris International.

Pirelli opted to bring the supersoft, the soft, and the medium tire to the 2018 Japanese Grand Prix. Lewis Hamilton was the defending winner, having won the previous round in Russia. He was also the defending winner at Suzuka, having won the previous Japanese Grand Prix in 2017. Weather was a potential factor, with a chance of rain through many sessions of the weekend.

== Qualifying ==
Lewis Hamilton claimed pole position for the race and claimed his 80th pole position in his career. His teammate Valtteri Bottas finished second, and together they achieved Mercedes' fifth one two in qualifying in a row at Suzuka. Rain was a factor in the Q2 and Q3 sessions. Mercedes' strategy was key to their one two as they sent both their drivers out on supersoft tires, despite the chance for rain in the Q3 session.

Hamilton's main title rival, Sebastian Vettel, as well as his teammate Kimi Raikkonen, was sent out by Ferrari on Intermediates. However, neither Raikkonen nor Vettel completed their laps, and switched to supersofts immediately. Not being on the track on the correct tire at the optimal time, Vettel could only manage 9th after he made a mistake on his lap on the dry tires. Max Verstappen and Kimi Räikkönen started third and fourth respectively. Vettel would start 8th after Esteban Ocon received a 3 place grid penalty for ignoring red flags in Free Practice 3.

Other noteworthy qualifying performances include Romain Grosjean qualifying 5th for Haas, and Brendon Hartley achieving his best ever starting position of 6th in his Toro Rosso. Hartley's teammate Pierre Gasly, lined up behind him in 7th. Daniel Ricciardo failed to set a time in Q2 due to power unit issues and started 15th as a result. The noteworthy incident of qualifying, apart from he rain, was Marcus Ericsson, who hit the Barriers in Q1 and brought out the red flag.

Both Hamilton and Bottas, along with Grosjean, completed their fastest laps in Q2 on soft tires. As they progressed to Q3, they would start the race on softs. All other Q3 drivers qualified in Q2 on supersofts. Everybody who had a free choice of tire started on the softs, apart from Nico Hülkenberg who opted for the mediums.

Pos.	No.	Driver	Constructor	Qualifying times			Final grid
Pos.	No.	Driver	Constructor	Q1	Q2	Q3	Final grid
1	44	(United Kingdom) Lewis Hamilton	Mercedes	1:28.702	1:28.017	1:27.760	1
2	77	(Finland) Valtteri Bottas	Mercedes	1:29.297	1:27.987	1:28.059	2
3	33	(Netherlands) Max Verstappen	Red Bull Racing-TAG Heuer	1:29.480	1:28.849	1:29.057	3
4	7	(Finland) Kimi Räikkönen	Ferrari	1:29.631	1:28.595	1:29.521	4
5	8	(France) Romain Grosjean	Haas-Ferrari	1:29.724	1:29.678	1:29.761	5
6	28	(New Zealand) Brendon Hartley	Scuderia Toro Rosso-Honda	1:30.248	1:29.848	1:30.023	6
7	10	(France) Pierre Gasly	Scuderia Toro Rosso-Honda	1:30.137	1:29.810	1:30.093	7
8	31	(France) Esteban Ocon	Racing Point Force India-Mercedes	1:29.899	1:29.538	1:30.126	11^{a}
9	5	(Germany) Sebastian Vettel	Ferrari	1:29.049	1:28.279	1:32.192	8
10	11	(Mexico) Sergio Pérez	Racing Point Force India-Mercedes	1:30.247	1:29.567	1:37.229	9
11	16	(Monaco) Charles Leclerc	Sauber-Ferrari	1:29.706	1:29.864		10
12	20	(Denmark) Kevin Magnussen	Haas-Ferrari	1:30.219	1:30.226		12
13	55	(Spain) Carlos Sainz Jr.	Renault	1:30.236	1:30.490		13
14	18	(Canada) Lance Stroll	Williams-Mercedes	1:30.317	1:30.714		14
15	3	(Australia) Daniel Ricciardo	Red Bull Racing-TAG Heuer	1:29.806	No time		15
16	27	(Germany) Nico Hülkenberg	Renault	1:30.361			16
17	35	(Russia) Sergey Sirotkin	Williams-Mercedes	1:30.372			17
18	14	(Spain) Fernando Alonso	McLaren-Renault	1:30.573			18
19	2	(Belgium) Stoffel Vandoorne	McLaren-Renault	1:31.041			19
20	9	(Sweden) Marcus Ericsson	Sauber-Ferrari	1:31.213			20^{b}
107% time: 1:34.911

Notes

- ^a – Esteban Ocon received a three-place grid penalty for failing to slow sufficiently during a red flag period in FP3.
- ^b – Marcus Ericsson received a 15-place grid penalty: 10 places for change his power unit and 5 places for an unscheduled gearbox change.

== Race ==
=== Race start ===
Hamilton got a good start and led from pole position. Bottas also started well and preserved the Mercedes one two. Vettel started well and was in fifth by the end of lap 1. Also on lap 1, Lance Stroll pushed Fernando Alonso off the track. Stroll would later receive a five second penalty for this, but Alonso would also receive a five second penalty for the same incident as he was deemed to have gained an advantage by going off the track. On lap 2, Verstappen pushed Raikkonen off the track when rejoining the track, and Vettel took fourth as a result. Verstappen would be given a five second penalty for this incident. By lap 3, Riccardo had reached 10th position from his starting grid position of 15th.

On lap 3, the safety car was deployed to allow marshals to clear up debris from the incident between Charles Leclerc and Kevin Magnussen on the pit straight. Magnussen had moved across the track to defend from Leclerc, with Leclerc moving to avoid Magnussen, and crashing into his rear. The incident gave Magnussen a puncture and Leclerc a broken front wing. Both would pit shortly to fix the damage that resulted from the incident. Magnussen's lap to return to the pits with his puncture created much of the debris that needed to be cleaned up during the safety car period.

=== Mid-race ===
The safety car period ended on lap 7. On lap 8, Vettel proceeded to attack Verstappen, however, an overtake attempt on the third placed Verstappen sent Vettel spinning, and resulted in him rejoining the race in 19th. Verstappen sustained some floor damage to his car as a result of this incident, and Vettel also took some damage to his sidepods. The stewards deemed this collision to be a racing incident, and as such, no penalties were handed out.

On Lap 9, Magnussen would retire his car from the damage it sustained in the collision with Leclerc. On lap 13, Ricciardo overtook Pierre Gasly for 6th, and a lap later, he would take fifth position from Grosjean. Raikkonen was the first of the frontrunners to pit, on lap 18, and swapped his supersofts for medium tires. He was followed by Verstappen on lap 22 pitting onto the softs, who was able to preserve third over Raikkonen despite serving his five second penalty.

Both Bottas and Ricciardo pitted on lap 23, both onto mediums, with Ricciardo able to overcut Raikkonen to take fourth position. A lap later Hamilton would also pit onto mediums, meaning at this point all the frontrunners had completed their first stops. On lap 27, Vettel, who had climbed to 10th position by this point, pit for soft tires. On lap 36, after overtaking a few cars, and a few pitstops by midfield drivers, Vettel would take 6th. On lap 39, Hulkenberg would retire his car to become the second DNF. He would be followed by Leclerc who retired his car by stopping on the side of the track. This brought out the Virtual Safety Car, and racing would resume in lap 42.

=== Finish ===
The top 5 would stay in their positions to the finish. Hamilton picked up his 71st career victory, and his ninth win of the season, having led every lap of the race. It also marked his 50th win at Mercedes. Bottas picked up his first podium finish in Suzuka with his second place result, and with Hamilton's victory, combined for Mercedes' 44th one-two result. Verstappen was close to Bottas for the last few laps of the race, but was unable to overtake, and took 3rd place. He picked up his third podium in three races at Suzuka. Vettel finished the race in 6th position, but was able to take the fastest lap of the race on the last lap. Sergio Pérez finished in 7th to claim the "best of the rest" position for Force India.

This win moved Hamilton 67 points clear of Vettel in the Driver's Championship Standings. Beating Vettel by 8 points in the next round in the United States would win Hamilton his fifth Driver's World Championship. This race also left Perez, Magnussen, and Hulkenberg tied for the same number of points in the championship. All three were battling for the best of the rest position of 7th behind the 6 big team drivers. Perez held 7th after Suzuka thanks to his 3rd place finish in the Azerbaijan Grand Prix.

=== Post race ===
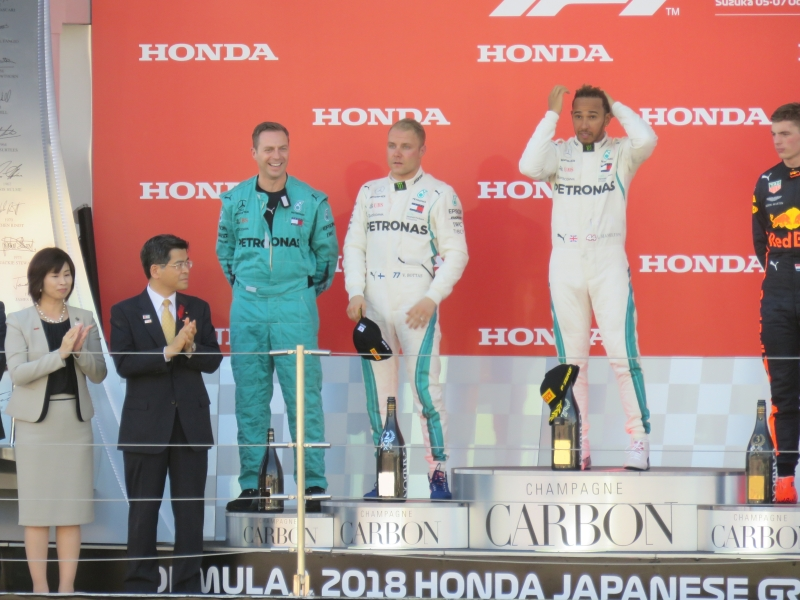
The podium ceremony after the race

In post race interviews, Vettel blamed his spin on Verstappen, stating that he had not been left "enough room". Verstappen put the blame on Vettel, claiming that the Spoon curve, where the incident occurred, is not a spot to overtake. He claimed that Vettel "understeered into" him. Verstappen also expressed his disappointment with the five second penalty he incurred for his rejoining incident with Raikkonen, stating that he rejoined the track "in a safe way" and that he felt that Räikkönen should have waited for him to reenter the track. Lewis Hamilton would describe himself as "very, very happy" with his drive, also describing the weekend as "very strong" for the team.

=== Race classification ===
Pos.	No.	Driver	Constructor	Laps	Time/Retired	Grid	Points
1	44	(United Kingdom) Lewis Hamilton	Mercedes	53	1:27:17.062	1	25
2	77	(Finland) Valtteri Bottas	Mercedes	53	+12.919	2	18
3	33	(Netherlands) Max Verstappen	Red Bull Racing-TAG Heuer	53	+14.295	3	15
4	3	(Australia) Daniel Ricciardo	Red Bull Racing-TAG Heuer	53	+19.495	15	12
5	7	(Finland) Kimi Räikkönen	Ferrari	53	+50.998	4	10
6	5	(Germany) Sebastian Vettel	Ferrari	53	+1:09.873	8	8
7	11	(Mexico) Sergio Pérez	Racing Point Force India-Mercedes	53	+1:19.379	9	6
8	8	(France) Romain Grosjean	Haas-Ferrari	53	+1:27.198	5	4
9	31	(France) Esteban Ocon	Racing Point Force India-Mercedes	53	+1:28.055	11	2
10	55	(Spain) Carlos Sainz Jr.	Renault	52	+1 lap	13	1
11	10	(France) Pierre Gasly	Scuderia Toro Rosso-Honda	52	+1 lap	7	
12	9	(Sweden) Marcus Ericsson	Sauber-Ferrari	52	+1 lap	20	
13	28	(New Zealand) Brendon Hartley	Scuderia Toro Rosso-Honda	52	+1 lap	6	
14	14	(Spain) Fernando Alonso	McLaren-Renault	52	+1 lap	18	
15	2	(Belgium) Stoffel Vandoorne	McLaren-Renault	52	+1 lap	19	
16	35	(Russia) Sergey Sirotkin	Williams-Mercedes	52	+1 lap	17	
17	18	(Canada) Lance Stroll	Williams-Mercedes	52	+1 lap	14	
Ret	16	(Monaco) Charles Leclerc	Sauber-Ferrari	38	Mechanical	10	
Ret	27	(Germany) Nico Hülkenberg	Renault	37	Engine	16	
Ret	20	(Denmark) Kevin Magnussen	Haas-Ferrari	8	Collision damage	12	

== Championship standings after the race ==
Drivers' Championship standings

Pos.	Driver	Points
1	(United Kingdom) Lewis Hamilton*	331
2	(Germany) Sebastian Vettel*	264
3	(Finland) Valtteri Bottas	207
4	(Finland) Kimi Räikkönen	196
5	(Netherlands) Max Verstappen	173

Constructors' Championship standings

Pos.	Constructor	Points
1	(Germany) Mercedes*	538
2	(Italy) Ferrari*	460
3	(Austria) Red Bull Racing-TAG Heuer	319
4	(France) Renault	92
5	(United States) Haas-Ferrari	84

- Note: Only the top five positions are included for both sets of standings.
- Bold text and an asterisk indicates competitors who still had a theoretical chance of becoming World Champion.

Previous race: 2018 Russian Grand Prix	FIA Formula One World Championship; 2018 season	Next race: 2018 United States Grand Prix
Previous race: 2017 Japanese Grand Prix	Japanese Grand Prix	Next race: 2019 Japanese Grand Prix
