= 2024 Japanese Grand Prix =

Fourth round of the 2024 F1 season

Race 4 of 24 in the 2024 Formula One World Championship
← Previous race	Next race →
- Layout of the Suzuka International Racing Course

Race details
- Date: 7 April 2024
- Official name: Formula 1 MSC Cruises Japanese Grand Prix 2024
- Location: Suzuka International Racing Course; Suzuka, Mie Prefecture, Japan
- Course: Permanent racing facility
- Course length: 5.807 km (3.608 miles)
- Distance: 53 laps, 307.471 km (191.054 miles)
- Weather: Sunny
- Attendance: 229,000

Pole position
Driver	(Netherlands) Max Verstappen	Red Bull Racing-Honda RBPT
- Time: 1:28.197

Fastest lap
Driver	(Netherlands) Max Verstappen	Red Bull Racing-Honda RBPT
- Time: 1:33.706 on lap 50

Podium
First	(Netherlands) Max Verstappen	Red Bull Racing-Honda RBPT
Second	(Mexico) Sergio Pérez	Red Bull Racing-Honda RBPT
Third	(Spain) Carlos Sainz Jr.	Ferrari

The 2024 Japanese Grand Prix (officially known as the Formula 1 MSC Cruises Japanese Grand Prix 2024) was a Formula One motor race held on 7 April 2024 at the Suzuka International Racing Course in Suzuka, Japan. It was the fourth round of the 2024 Formula One World Championship. It was won by polesitter Max Verstappen driving for Red Bull, with teammate Sergio Pérez and Ferrari driver Carlos Sainz Jr. behind him. Yuki Tsunoda of RB scored a point, the first Japanese Formula One driver to do so at their home race since the 2012 edition of the race.

Following the race, Verstappen extended his lead in the World Drivers' Championship to 13 points over Pérez, who overtook Charles Leclerc in the standings to reclaim second place by five points. In the World Constrcutors' Championship, Red Bull extended their points advantage to 21 points over Ferrari.

== Background ==
The event was held at the Suzuka International Racing Course in Suzuka for the 34th time in the circuit's history, across the weekend of 5–7 April. The Grand Prix was the fourth round of the 2024 Formula One World Championship and the 49th running of the Japanese Grand Prix. The edition was the first time that the event was held as an early-season round, a departure from its traditional schedule between September and November. The move was part of Formula One's regionalisation efforts, which put the Japanese Grand Prix between the Australian and Chinese Grands Prix.

The weekend marked the tenth anniversary of the fatal accident of Jules Bianchi. Charles Leclerc wore a full tribute helmet to Bianchi.

=== Championship standings ===
Ahead of the weekend race, Max Verstappen led the Drivers' Championship with 51 points, four points from Charles Leclerc in second, and five from his teammate Sergio Pérez in third. Red Bull Racing led the Constructors' Championship with 97 points, separated from Ferrari by 4 points and from McLaren by 42, in second and third, respectively.

=== Entrants ===
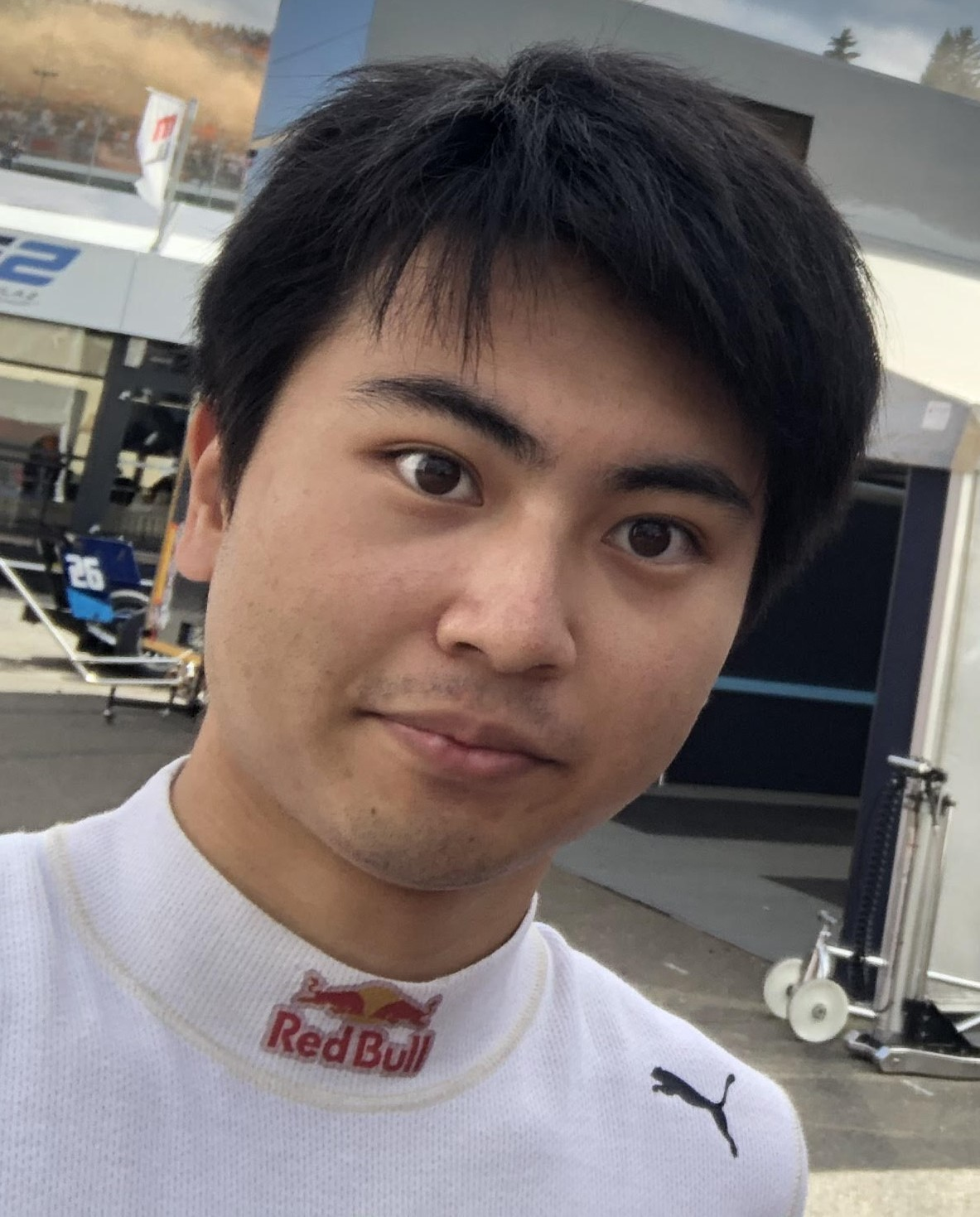
Ayumu Iwasa drove for RB in the first free practice session, making his Formula One practice debut.

The drivers and teams were the same as the season entry list with no additional stand-in drivers for the race. Ayumu Iwasa made his Formula One practice debut for RB, driving in place of Daniel Ricciardo in the first free practice session.

=== Tyre choices ===
Tyre supplier Pirelli brought the C1, C2, and C3 tyre compounds (the three hardest in their range) designated hard, medium, and soft, respectively, for teams to use at the event.

== Practice ==
Three free practice sessions were held for the event. The first free practice session was held on 5 April 2024, at 11:30 local time (UTC+9), and was topped by Red Bull driver Max Verstappen ahead of his teammate Sergio Pérez and Carlos Sainz Jr. of Ferrari. The session was red-flagged after Williams's Logan Sargeant lost control of his car and hit the wall, breaking his front wing. The second free practice session was held on the same day, at 15:00 local time, and was topped by Mclaren's Oscar Piastri ahead of Lewis Hamilton of Mercedes and Ferrari driver Charles Leclerc. The damp conditions prevented most drivers from completing a run, and only five set competitive lap times. The third free practice session was held on 6 April 2024, at 11:30 local time, and was topped by Verstappen ahead of his teammate Pérez and George Russell of Mercedes.

== Qualifying ==
Qualifying was held on 6 April 2024, at 15:00 local time (UTC+9).

=== Qualifying classification ===
Pos.	No.	Driver	Constructor	Qualifying times			Final grid
Pos.	No.	Driver	Constructor	Q1	Q2	Q3	Final grid
1	1	(Netherlands) Max Verstappen	Red Bull Racing-Honda RBPT	1:28.866	1:28.740	1:28.197	1
2	11	(Mexico) Sergio Pérez	Red Bull Racing-Honda RBPT	1:29.303	1:28.752	1:28.263	2
3	4	(United Kingdom) Lando Norris	McLaren-Mercedes	1:29.536	1:28.940	1:28.489	3
4	55	(Spain) Carlos Sainz Jr.	Ferrari	1:29.513	1:29.099	1:28.682	4
5	14	(Spain) Fernando Alonso	Aston Martin Aramco-Mercedes	1:29.254	1:29.082	1:28.686	5
6	81	(Australia) Oscar Piastri	McLaren-Mercedes	1:29.425	1:29.148	1:28.760	6
7	44	(United Kingdom) Lewis Hamilton	Mercedes	1:29.661	1:28.887	1:28.766	7
8	16	(Monaco) Charles Leclerc	Ferrari	1:29.338	1:29.196	1:28.786	8
9	63	(United Kingdom) George Russell	Mercedes	1:29.799	1:29.140	1:29.008	9
10	22	(Japan) Yuki Tsunoda	RB-Honda RBPT	1:29.775	1:29.417	1:29.413	10
11	3	(Australia) Daniel Ricciardo	RB-Honda RBPT	1:29.727	1:29.472	N/A	11
12	27	(Germany) Nico Hülkenberg	Haas-Ferrari	1:29.821	1:29.494	N/A	12
13	77	(Finland) Valtteri Bottas	Kick Sauber-Ferrari	1:29.602	1:29.593	N/A	13
14	23	(Thailand) Alexander Albon	Williams-Mercedes	1:29.963	1:29.714	N/A	14
15	31	(France) Esteban Ocon	Alpine-Renault	1:29.811	1:29.816	N/A	15
16	18	(Canada) Lance Stroll	Aston Martin Aramco-Mercedes	1:30.024	N/A	N/A	16
17	10	(France) Pierre Gasly	Alpine-Renault	1:30.119	N/A	N/A	17
18	20	(Denmark) Kevin Magnussen	Haas-Ferrari	1:30.131	N/A	N/A	18
19	2	(United States) Logan Sargeant	Williams-Mercedes	1:30.139	N/A	N/A	19
20	24	(China) Zhou Guanyu	Kick Sauber-Ferrari	1:30.143	N/A	N/A	20
107% time: 1:35.086

== Race ==
The race was held on 7 April 2024, at 14:00 local time (UTC+9), and was run for 53 laps.

=== Race report ===
Polesitter Max Verstappen, driving for Red Bull, led the race into the first corner before a crash involving Daniel Ricciardo and Alexander Albon neutralised the race for over twenty minutes while the tyre barriers had to be repaired. Following the red flag period, the race restarted with a standing start on lap three. On lap 12, Sauber driver Zhou Guanyu retired due to a gearbox problem, the third retirement of the race. Verstappen remained unchallenged, eventually making his pit stop on lap 16. This handed the lead of the race to Ferrari's Charles Leclerc, but Verstappen, who had a significant tyre advantage, closed the gap to Leclerc and by lap 20 retook the lead. By that point, it became clear that Leclerc was performing a one-stop strategy on his medium tyres, and swapped to hards by the end of lap 26. Leclerc's one-stop strategy would prove effective, while the Mercedes drivers of Lewis Hamilton and George Russell, who had swapped to hards during the red-flag period, were struggling with tyre degradation. A brief yellow flag period was observed on lap 42, after Logan Sargeant in the sole remaining Williams drove into the gravel at turn 9, but was able to reverse back on track and continue. As the race entered its final laps, Carlos Sainz Jr. overtook Leclerc for the last spot on the podium behind Verstappen's teammate Sergio Pérez. Russell attempted to overtake Oscar Piastri at turn 16 in the closing laps; Piastri temporarily maintained his position, but on the final lap Russell successfully overtook Piastri to finish in seventh. Yuki Tsunoda of RB scored one point in tenth, the first Japanese Formula One driver to score a point at their home race since Kamui Kobayashi's podium at the 2012 Japanese Grand Prix.

Following the conclusion of this round, Verstappen extended his lead in the Drivers' Standings to thirteen points over Pérez, who leapfrogged Leclerc in the standings to reclaim second place by five points. Sainz remained fourth in the standings, a further four points behind Leclerc, while Lando Norris improved to fifth with 37 points. In the Constrcutors' Championship, Red Bull extended their points advantage to 21 points over Ferrari, McLaren remained third ahead of Mercedes, a total of 72 points beind championship leader Red Bull.

=== Race classification ===
Pos.	No.	Driver	Constructor	Laps	Time/Retired	Grid	Points
1	1	(Netherlands) Max Verstappen	Red Bull Racing-Honda RBPT	53	1:54:23.566	1	26^{a}
2	11	(Mexico) Sergio Pérez	Red Bull Racing-Honda RBPT	53	+12.535	2	18
3	55	(Spain) Carlos Sainz Jr.	Ferrari	53	+20.866	4	15
4	16	(Monaco) Charles Leclerc	Ferrari	53	+26.522	8	12
5	4	(United Kingdom) Lando Norris	McLaren-Mercedes	53	+29.700	3	10
6	14	(Spain) Fernando Alonso	Aston Martin Aramco-Mercedes	53	+44.272	5	8
7	63	(United Kingdom) George Russell	Mercedes	53	+45.951	9	6
8	81	(Australia) Oscar Piastri	McLaren-Mercedes	53	+47.525	6	4
9	44	(United Kingdom) Lewis Hamilton	Mercedes	53	+48.626	7	2
10	22	(Japan) Yuki Tsunoda	RB-Honda RBPT	52	+1 lap	10	1
11	27	(Germany) Nico Hülkenberg	Haas-Ferrari	52	+1 lap	12	
12	18	(Canada) Lance Stroll	Aston Martin Aramco-Mercedes	52	+1 lap	16	
13	20	(Denmark) Kevin Magnussen	Haas-Ferrari	52	+1 lap	18	
14	77	(Finland) Valtteri Bottas	Kick Sauber-Ferrari	52	+1 lap	13	
15	31	(France) Esteban Ocon	Alpine-Renault	52	+1 lap	15	
16	10	(France) Pierre Gasly	Alpine-Renault	52	+1 lap	17	
17	2	(United States) Logan Sargeant	Williams-Mercedes	52	+1 lap	19	
Ret	24	(China) Zhou Guanyu	Kick Sauber-Ferrari	12	Gearbox	20	
Ret	3	(Australia) Daniel Ricciardo	RB-Honda RBPT	0	Collision	11	
Ret	23	(Thailand) Alexander Albon	Williams-Mercedes	0	Collision	14	
Fastest lap: (Netherlands) Max Verstappen (Red Bull Racing-Honda RBPT) – 1:33.706 (lap 50)

Notes

- ^a – Includes one point for fastest lap.

== Championship standings after the race ==
Drivers' Championship standings

	Pos.	Driver	Points
	1	(Netherlands) Max Verstappen	77
1	2	(Mexico) Sergio Pérez	64
1	3	(Monaco) Charles Leclerc	59
	4	(Spain) Carlos Sainz Jr.	55
1	5	(United Kingdom) Lando Norris	37

Constructors' Championship standings

Pos.	Constructor	Points
1	(Austria) Red Bull Racing-Honda RBPT	141
2	(Italy) Ferrari	120
3	(United Kingdom) McLaren-Mercedes	69
4	(Germany) Mercedes	34
5	(United Kingdom) Aston Martin Aramco-Mercedes	33

- Note: Only the top five positions are included for both sets of standings.

Previous race: 2024 Australian Grand Prix	FIA Formula One World Championship; 2024 season	Next race: 2024 Chinese Grand Prix
Previous race: 2023 Japanese Grand Prix	Japanese Grand Prix	Next race: 2025 Japanese Grand Prix
