= 2019 Japanese Grand Prix =

2019 Formula 1 race

Race 17 of 21 in the 2019 Formula One World Championship
← Previous race	Next race →
- Layout of the Suzuka International Racing Course

Race details
- Date: 13 October 2019
- Official name: Formula 1 Japanese Grand Prix 2019
- Location: Suzuka International Racing Course, Suzuka, Mie Prefecture, Japan
- Course: Permanent racing facility
- Course length: 5.807 km (3.608 miles)
- Distance: 52 laps, 301.664 km (187.445 miles)
- Scheduled distance: 53 laps, 307.471 km (191.054 miles)
- Weather: Sunny
- Attendance: 122,000

Pole position
Driver	(Germany) Sebastian Vettel	Ferrari
- Time: 1:27.064

Fastest lap
Driver	(United Kingdom) Lewis Hamilton	Mercedes
- Time: 1:30.983 on lap 45

Podium
First	(Finland) Valtteri Bottas	Mercedes
Second	(Germany) Sebastian Vettel	Ferrari
Third	(United Kingdom) Lewis Hamilton	Mercedes

The 2019 Japanese Grand Prix (formally known as the Formula 1 Japanese Grand Prix 2019) was a Formula One racing event held on 13 October 2019 at the Suzuka International Racing Course in Suzuka in the Mie Prefecture, Japan. The race was the 17th round of the 2019 Formula One World Championship and marked the 45th running of the Japanese Grand Prix. The 2019 event was the 35th time that the race had been run as a World Championship event since the inaugural season in 1950, and the 31st time that it had been held at Suzuka.

This was the last time that both cars from a team were disqualified from a race until Scuderia Ferrari at the 2025 Chinese Grand Prix.

== Background ==
Formally called the "Formula 1 Japanese Grand Prix 2019", this Formula One Grand Prix event took place on 13 October 2019 at the Suzuka International Racing Course in Japan. The circuit, which held its first Grand Prix in 1987, has a lap length of 5.807 km (3.608 miles) and the 53-lap race distance is 307.471 km (191.054 miles). Going into the race, the lap record, of 1 minute 31.540 seconds, was held by Kimi Räikkönen who took it at the 2005 Grand Prix.

=== Weather ===
Due to the weather forecasts relating to Typhoon Hagibis, all the events planned for Saturday were cancelled. This included the Free Practice 3 session and qualifying, the latter of which was rescheduled for Sunday morning, a few hours before the race was due to start.

=== Championship standings before the race ===
Heading into the 17th round of the championship, Mercedes driver Lewis Hamilton led the Drivers' Championship with 322 points, 73 points ahead of teammate Valtteri Bottas. Third in the Drivers' Championship was Ferrari's driver Charles Leclerc with 215 points, with Max Verstappen from Red Bull Racing and Leclerc's teammate Sebastian Vettel in fourth and fifth places respectively. In the Constructors' Championship, Mercedes held a 162-point lead over second place Ferrari, with Red Bull Racing in third place. McLaren and Renault completed the top five.

=== Entrants ===
The drivers and teams were the same as the season entry list with no additional stand-in drivers for the race. However, Japanese driver Naoki Yamamoto drove in the first practice session for Scuderia Toro Rosso, replacing Pierre Gasly. As a result, Yamamoto became the first Japanese driver in F1 since Kamui Kobayashi.

The main title sponsor of Ferrari, Mission Winnow, returned from this race, after it was used by the Scuderia at the Bahrain, Chinese, Azerbaijan, Spanish and Monaco Grands Prix, but was not used at the Australian Grand Prix and from the Canadian Grand Prix until the Russian Grand Prix for legal reasons.

== Qualifying ==
Qualifying began on Sunday morning at 10:00am JST (UTC+9:00), just over 4 hours before the race was due to start. The skies were clear after Typhoon Hagibis had passed the previous day, however, there were still heavy winds affecting the circuit.

Q1

Two minutes into the session Robert Kubica hit the outside wall at the exit of turn 18 after running wide onto the grass destroying the car's front wing and left-hand wheels and causing significant damage to the survival cell. Kubica was uninjured and the session was red-flagged whilst his car was recovered and debris was cleared from the track. Four minutes after the session restarted Kevin Magnussen spun at the same corner causing him to reverse into the outside wall, damaging his gearbox, front and rear wings. The red flags came out again, however, Magnussen was able to continue driving completing a lap and entering the pits. Neither Kubica nor Magnussen were able to set a qualifying time, however, Williams and Haas were able to repair their respective cars before the beginning of the race with Kubica starting from the pit lane after his survival cell was replaced. Charles Leclerc set the fastest time of Q1 whilst Daniel Ricciardo, Sergio Pérez and George Russell were eliminated alongside Kubica and Magnussen.

Q2

After setting the 15th fastest time, Nico Hülkenberg's car suffered a loss of hydraulic pressure causing him to be stuck in gear. Hülkenberg slowly returned to the pits and his car was retired from the session. Valtteri Bottas set the fastest time of Q2 with Antonio Giovinazzi, Lance Stroll, Kimi Räikkönen and Daniil Kvyat being eliminated alongside Hülkenberg.

Q3

Sebastian Vettel took pole position ahead of Leclerc and Bottas. This was Vettel's first pole position since the Canadian Grand Prix and the fifth consecutive pole position for Ferrari. The team took their 64th front-row lockout, equalling Mercedes's record. The pole position time of 1:27.064, which was set by the German driver, meaning the fastest ever lap made in Suzuka, beating the previous best ever lap of 1:27.319, which was set by Lewis Hamilton during the qualifying of the 2017 edition. Vettel's pole would eventually turn out to be his final in Formula One. Vettel's lap time would stand until 2025, when Red Bull's Max Verstappen set a record lap time of 1:26:983 around Suzuka.

=== Qualifying classification ===
Pos.	No.	Driver	Constructor	Qualifying times			Final grid
Pos.	No.	Driver	Constructor	Q1	Q2	Q3	Final grid
1	5	(Germany) Sebastian Vettel	Ferrari	1:28.988	1:28.174	1:27.064	1
2	16	(Monaco) Charles Leclerc	Ferrari	1:28.405	1:28.179	1:27.253	2
3	77	(Finland) Valtteri Bottas	Mercedes	1:28.896	1:27.688	1:27.293	3
4	44	(United Kingdom) Lewis Hamilton	Mercedes	1:28.735	1:27.826	1:27.302	4
5	33	(Netherlands) Max Verstappen	Red Bull Racing-Honda	1:28.754	1:28.499	1:27.851^{1}	5
6	23	(Thailand) Alexander Albon	Red Bull Racing-Honda	1:29.351	1:28.156	1:27.851^{1}	6
7	55	(Spain) Carlos Sainz Jr.	McLaren-Renault	1:29.018	1:28.577	1:28.304	7
8	4	(United Kingdom) Lando Norris	McLaren-Renault	1:28.873	1:28.571	1:28.464	8
9	10	(France) Pierre Gasly	Scuderia Toro Rosso-Honda	1:29.411	1:28.779	1:28.836	9
10	8	(France) Romain Grosjean	Haas-Ferrari	1:29.572	1:29.144	1:29.341	10
11	99	(Italy) Antonio Giovinazzi	Alfa Romeo Racing-Ferrari	1:29.604	1:29.254	N/A	11
12	18	(Canada) Lance Stroll	Racing Point-BWT Mercedes	1:29.594	1:29.345	N/A	12
13	7	(Finland) Kimi Räikkönen	Alfa Romeo Racing-Ferrari	1:29.636	1:29.358	N/A	13
14	26	(Russia) Daniil Kvyat	Scuderia Toro Rosso-Honda	1:29.723	1:29.563	N/A	14
15	27	(Germany) Nico Hülkenberg	Renault	1:29.619	1:30.112	N/A	15
16	3	(Australia) Daniel Ricciardo	Renault	1:29.822	N/A	N/A	16
17	11	(Mexico) Sergio Pérez	Racing Point-BWT Mercedes	1:30.344	N/A	N/A	17
18	63	(United Kingdom) George Russell	Williams-Mercedes	1:30.364	N/A	N/A	18
107% time: 1:34.593
—	20	(Denmark) Kevin Magnussen	Haas-Ferrari	No time	N/A	N/A	19^{2}
—	88	(Poland) Robert Kubica	Williams-Mercedes	No time	N/A	N/A	PL^{2}

Notes

- ^1 – Max Verstappen and Alexander Albon set identical times in Q3; Verstappen was classified ahead as he set his lap time earlier.
- ^2 – Kevin Magnussen and Robert Kubica both failed to set a Q1 time. They were allowed to race at the stewards discretion. Kubica was also required to start the race from the pit lane for changing his survival cell.

== Race ==
At the start of the race Sebastian Vettel, on pole position, moved a fraction of a second too early. He was able to stop before overstepping his grid line, but this led to a poor start and the Ferrari was passed by the Mercedes of Valtteri Bottas almost immediately. Vettel was investigated for a false start, however the stewards later decided against penalising him given that he did not overstep his line and thus the sensors used to detect a false start were not triggered. Max Verstappen attempted an overtake on the outside of Charles Leclerc through turn 2 for third place, however, Leclerc understeered into Verstappen causing the Red Bull to spin out onto the grass. The collision resulted in significant damage to Verstappen's car and to Leclerc's front wing (also his left wing mirror), although both cars were able to continue racing.

Leclerc was instructed by his team to enter the pits at the end of the opening lap, however, he was not aware of the damage to his front wing and stayed out on track as the damaged front wing wasn't affecting his performance significantly. Over the course of the second lap pieces of Leclerc's front wing broke off before the endplate detached entirely on the straight after turn 14, this endplate then hit Lewis Hamilton's car, which was directly behind him, breaking off one of the Mercedes's wing mirrors. After initially informing the stewards that Leclerc would pit at the end of lap 2 the team felt his car was now safe and instructed him to stay out for a third lap after which the race director ordered the car be brought into the pits to change its front wing. On lap 2 the stewards deemed the collision between Leclerc and Verstappen a racing incident with no investigation necessary.

On lap 4 Alexander Albon attempted an overtake on the inside of Lando Norris at turn 16. The cars collided and Norris was left with floor damage harming his pace for the rest of the race. The incident was not investigated by the stewards. Norris had also earlier collected debris from Leclerc's front wing in his brake ducts which forced him to pit to avoid a brake fire dropping him to the back of the field. On lap 7 the stewards decided to re-open the investigation into the lap 1 collision between Leclerc and Verstappen, later deciding that the incident would be investigated after the race. Both drivers were by now attempting to come back through the field with Leclerc passing Verstappen for 16th place on lap 9. Verstappen's car was later retired from the race on lap 14 after having only managed to pass the two Williams cars with the team deciding that the damage from the opening lap incident was too great to continue.

On lap 15 Albon was the first of the front-runners to make a pit stop from fifth place, Vettel then pitted on lap 16 from second place as did Bottas from the lead on lap 17 causing Hamilton to inherit the race lead. Hamilton pitted on lap 21 handing the lead back to Bottas and restoring the order of the top three. Hamilton was fitted with medium-compound tyres with the team informing him that the plan was for him not to make another pit stop. This was despite degradation from previous laps meaning that he was now over 20 seconds behind the race leader. This made it improbable that Hamilton would be able to stay close enough to the leaders for him to take the race lead when Bottas and Vettel made an additional pit stop if Hamilton would have to preserve his tyres to last till the end of the race. Hamilton criticised the decision not to use hard-compound tyres, telling the team over radio "I'm out of the race now" after the team admitted that it was likely that Hamilton would have to make a second pit stop.

Carlos Sainz made his pit stop from fourth place on lap 26 emerging behind Albon, meaning the Red Bull had gained a position over Sainz through the pit stops. Vettel made a second pit stop on lap 31 emerging in third place. By lap 34 Leclerc had made it past Pierre Gasly and into sixth place from the back of the field. Bottas made his second stop on lap 36 coming out in second place behind Hamilton. Hamilton was later pitted on lap 42 emerging in 3rd place behind Vettel. Leclerc was unable to keep up with Sainz's McLaren in the closing laps and the team decided to pit him on lap 47 for an attempt to claim the point for fastest lap.

On the final lap Sergio Pérez attempted an overtake around the outside of Gasly for eighth place at turn 2. The two cars collided sending Pérez into the gravel. Under normal conditions Pérez would have been classified in 17th place as the two Williams cars were a lap behind him. However, the chequered flag lighting panels had mistakenly been shown to the leaders a lap early meaning that the results of the race were taken from the end of the 52nd lap. Thus, Pérez kept ninth place. Hamilton spent the closing laps attempting to catch and overtake Vettel but was ultimately unsuccessful. However, Hamilton was able to claim the fastest lap point.

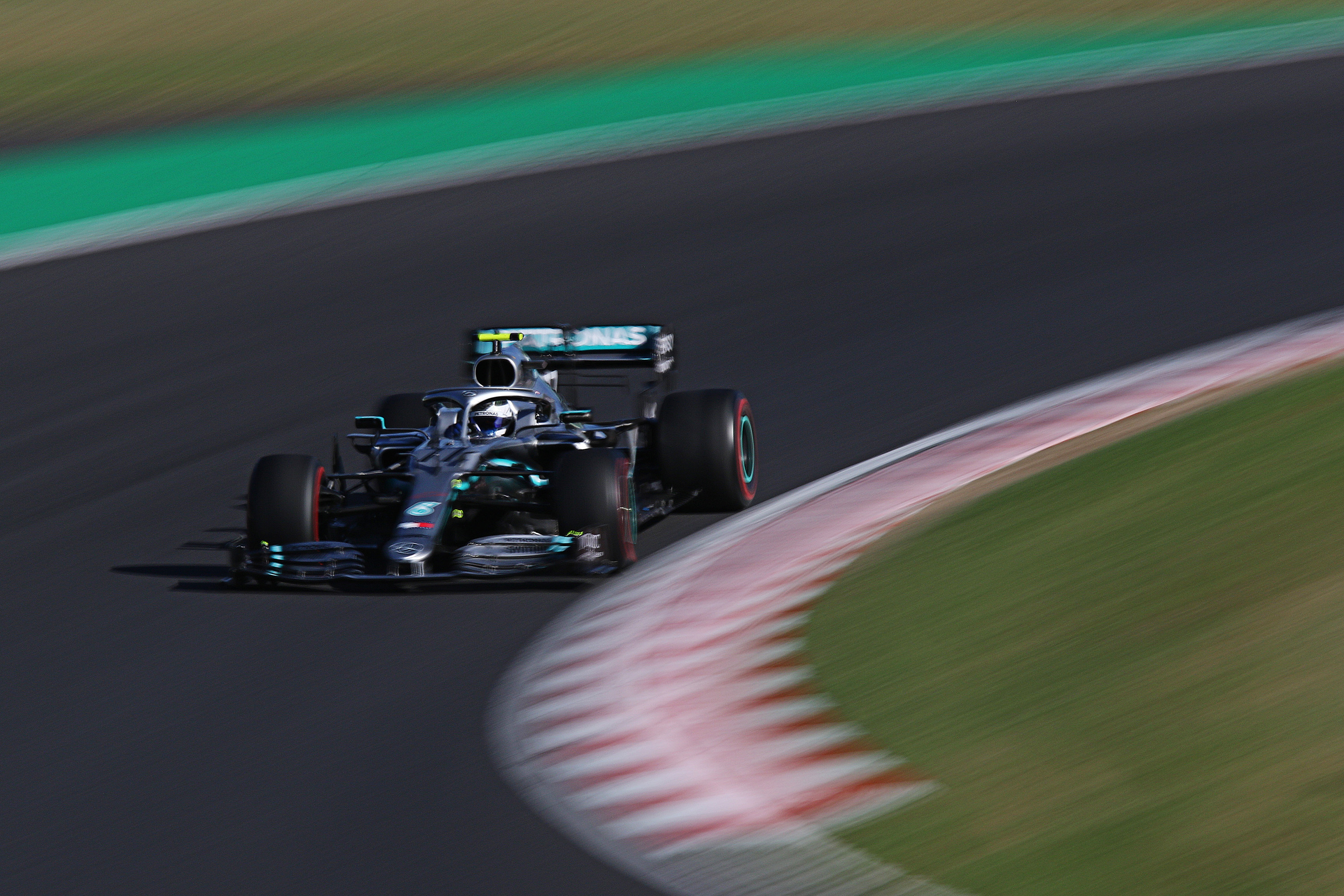
Bottas took his third win of the season

With Bottas crossing the line to take victory, Leclerc, Verstappen and Vettel were eliminated from the Drivers' Championship title contention. This, together with Mercedes outscoring Ferrari, their closest rivals, by 17 points, meant that Mercedes were assured their sixth consecutive Drivers' and Constructors' championships (with the Drivers' Championship winner still undecided between Hamilton and Bottas), a feat never before achieved by a team in the history of Formula One (the previous record was five consecutive Drivers' and six consecutive Constructors' championships for Ferrari between 1999 and 2004).

After the race, Leclerc was handed two penalties: a 5-second penalty for causing the collision with Verstappen, and a 10-second penalty for driving in an unsafe condition in the following laps. This demoted him to seventh place behind Daniel Ricciardo. Racing Point submitted a protest to the stewards over alleged illegal use of a "pre-set lap distance-dependent brake bias adjustment system" by Renault. On 23 October, ten days after the race, Renault was found to have used illegal driver aids and both drivers were disqualified from the results of the race, hence Leclerc kept his sixth place.

On lap 45, Lewis Hamilton scored the new race lap record in Suzuka, with a time of 1:30.983, beating the previous race lap record time of 1:31.540, which was set by Kimi Räikkönen at the 2005 Japanese Grand Prix.

=== Race classification ===
Pos.	No.	Driver	Constructor	Laps^{1}	Time/Retired	Grid	Points
1	77	(Finland) Valtteri Bottas	Mercedes	52	1:21:46.755	3	25
2	5	(Germany) Sebastian Vettel	Ferrari	52	+13.343	1	18
3	44	(United Kingdom) Lewis Hamilton	Mercedes	52	+13.858	4	16^{2}
4	23	(Thailand) Alexander Albon	Red Bull Racing-Honda	52	+59.537	6	12
5	55	(Spain) Carlos Sainz Jr.	McLaren-Renault	52	+1:09.101	7	10
6	16	(Monaco) Charles Leclerc	Ferrari	51	+1 lap^{3}	2	8
7	10	(France) Pierre Gasly	Scuderia Toro Rosso-Honda	51	+1 lap	9	6
8^{1}	11	(Mexico) Sergio Pérez	Racing Point-BWT Mercedes	51	+1 lap	17	4
9	18	(Canada) Lance Stroll	Racing Point-BWT Mercedes	51	+1 lap	12	2
10	26	(Russia) Daniil Kvyat	Scuderia Toro Rosso-Honda	51	+1 lap	14	1
11	4	(United Kingdom) Lando Norris	McLaren-Renault	51	+1 lap	8	
12	7	(Finland) Kimi Räikkönen	Alfa Romeo Racing-Ferrari	51	+1 lap	13	
13	8	(France) Romain Grosjean	Haas-Ferrari	51	+1 lap	10	
14	99	(Italy) Antonio Giovinazzi	Alfa Romeo Racing-Ferrari	51	+1 lap	11	
15	20	(Denmark) Kevin Magnussen	Haas-Ferrari	51	+1 lap	19	
16	63	(United Kingdom) George Russell	Williams-Mercedes	50	+2 laps	18	
17	88	(Poland) Robert Kubica	Williams-Mercedes	50	+2 laps	PL	
Ret	33	(Netherlands) Max Verstappen	Red Bull Racing-Honda	14	Collision damage	5	
DSQ^{4}	3	(Australia) Daniel Ricciardo	Renault	51	Brake bias	16	
DSQ^{4}	27	(Germany) Nico Hülkenberg	Renault	51	Brake bias	15	
Fastest lap: (United Kingdom) Lewis Hamilton (Mercedes) – 1:30.983 (lap 45)

Notes

- ^1 – The race was scheduled to run 53 laps, but the results were taken at the end of lap 52 due to the chequered flag signal being mistakenly shown to drivers one lap too early. As a result, Sergio Pérez retained his ninth place, despite retiring from the race during the final scheduled lap. This later became eighth place after the disqualification of both Renault drivers.
- ^2 – Includes one point for fastest lap.
- ^3 – Charles Leclerc received two time penalties: five seconds for causing a collision with Max Verstappen, and ten seconds for driving in an unsafe condition after the collision. After the disqualification of both Renault drivers, this did not affect his sixth-place finish.
- ^4 – Daniel Ricciardo and Nico Hülkenberg were originally classified seventh and tenth, but were disqualified ten days after the race for using illegal driver aids after a protest brought forward by Racing Point.

== Championship standings after the race ==
Drivers' Championship standings

Pos.	Driver	Points
1	(United Kingdom) **Lewis Hamilton***	338
2	(Finland) **Valtteri Bottas***	274
3	(Monaco) Charles Leclerc	223
4	(Netherlands) Max Verstappen	212
5	(Germany) Sebastian Vettel	212

Constructors' Championship standings

Pos.	Constructor	Points
1	(Germany) **Mercedes**	612
2	(Italy) Ferrari	435
3	(Austria) Red Bull Racing-Honda	323
4	(United Kingdom) McLaren-Renault	111
5	(France) Renault	68

- Note: Only the top five positions are included for both sets of standings.
- **Bold text** indicates the 2019 World Constructors' Champions.
- **Bold text** and an asterisk indicates competitors who still had a theoretical chance of becoming World Champion.

Previous race: 2019 Russian Grand Prix	FIA Formula One World Championship; 2019 season	Next race: 2019 Mexican Grand Prix
Previous race: 2018 Japanese Grand Prix	Japanese Grand Prix	Next race: 2022 Japanese Grand Prix; 2020 and 2021 editions cancelled
