= Eduardo Freitas =

Motorsport race director (born 1961)

- Born: October 27, 1961 (age 64); Portugal
- Occupation: Motorsports official

Eduardo Freitas (born October 27, 1961) is a Portuguese motorsports official and race director. Freitas serves as the race director for the FIA World Endurance Championship. He served as the race director for Formula One in 2022 alongside Niels Wittich. Freitas has also worked for several other series, such as the European Le Mans Series and the Asian Le Mans Series.

== Early life ==
Freitas was born on October 27, 1961, in Portugal. Freitas described his teenage years, passion for motorcycles, around 1977, as "having fun on weekends repairing two-stroke engines on small motorcycles". From that a friend invited him "to do the same on a two-stroke karting engine."

== Career ==
=== Early career ===
Similar to former Formula One race director Charlie Whiting, Freitas then began his motorsport career, when a friend invited him to work as a karting mechanic during the World Karting Championship in Estoril, 1979.

The Portuguese then rose through the ranks from track marshal to race director in karting.

During his work as track secretary at the Estoril circuit in 2002, he was asked to lead the FIA GT and ETCC Championship for a season, a role he retained until the end of 2009.

After that, the FIA promoted Freitas to the FIA GT1 global championship, and in 2012, he was named race director for the WEC – World Endurance Championship.

In total, he has worked in motorsports as mechanic, track marshal, track secretary, clerk of the course, and race director for single car, touring car and endurance racing events for over 40 years, including serving as race director for the FIA WEC, and the Le Mans 24 Hours Series, the ELMS – European Le Mans Series and the Asian Le Mans Series for 20 years.

=== Formula One ===
In Formula One Freitas worked alongside both former Formula One race directors Michael Masi and his predecessor Charlie Whiting in FIA conferences and race director meetings at the governing body. During the 2020 Portuguese Grand Prix, he shadowed Michael Masi as part of the race direction team for his home race in Portimão, at the Algarve International Circuit.

Following the controversial ending of the 2021 Formula One Abu Dhabi Grand Prix, a petition was started by Formula One fans to appoint Freitas as new race director.

On 17 February 2022, the FIA announced Masi was removed from his role as race director following an FIA analysis into the events of the 2021 Abu Dhabi Grand Prix. Freitas and Niels Wittich replaced him, splitting the role as race directors, with Herbie Blash acting as their "Permanent Senior Advisor".

At the 2022 Japanese Grand Prix, a race directed by Freitas, there was a great controversy in which a recovery vehicle went out on the track to pick up Carlos Sainz's car - who had had an accident - in wet conditions and without all the drivers regrouped. Despite the fact that the FOM did not show these images live, they were leaked on social networks, and several drivers spoke out against the action of the race director. Following the event, the FIA announced an investigation into what happened at the Grand Prix. Finally, on the weekend of the United States Grand Prix, the FIA admitted the mistakes made in Japan and announced that Eduardo Freitas would not be the race director again in 2022, leaving the position solely to Niels Wittich. Freitas had served as race director at 8 Grands Prix until then.
