= Scot Elkins =

American motorsport executive and official (born 1969 or 1970)

- Born: 1969 or 1970 (age 56); Indiana, United States
- Education: Indiana State University
- Occupations: Motorsport executive and official
- Employer(s): CCWS (2005–2008); ALMS/IMSA (2008–2015); FIA (2016–2025); IndyCar (2026–)
- Children: 4

Scot Elkins (born 1969 or 1970) is an American motorsport executive and official who serves as the Managing Director of Officiating for IndyCar. He previously served as the race director for Formula E and as a deputy race director for Formula One.

== Career ==
=== Engineering and technical roles ===
From 2000 to 2004, Elkins served as an engineering team manager for Robert Yates Racing, a NASCAR team. After that, he became an engineer for Toyota. Following this, he returned to Indiana State University — which he is an alumnus of — to become an adjunct professor of motorsports management.

Beginning in 2005, Elkins served as a technical official for the Champ Car World Series. In this capacity, he helped organize the merger between the series and the Indy Racing League in 2008. From 2008 to 2015, Elkins served as a technical executive for the American Le Mans Series and later the IMSA SportsCar Championship.

=== Race director ===
Elkins was appointed as the race director for the USF2000 Championship and the Pro Mazda Championship around the time of his departure from IMSA. Joining the series in 2016, Elkins served as the race director for Formula E — a worldwide electric racing series — starting for the 2017–18 season. As an official of the FIA, he remained in this role until his departure from the series following the 2025 Miami ePrix, being replaced by his deputy, Marek Hanaczewski. In addition to this role, Elkins served as the race director for Extreme E. He also took up race directing for Deutsche Tourenwagen Masters during its 2022 season, replacing the outgoing Niels Wittich.

Elkins occasionally served as a deputy race director for Formula One beginning in 2018, initially under Charlie Whiting. He shared the role with Michael Masi, who went on to become race director following Whiting's death. Elkins was the deputy race director during the controversial 2021 Abu Dhabi Grand Prix, which prompted Masi's removal from the role by the FIA. Furthermore, he assisted with race directing for FIA Formula 2 and FIA Formula 3.

=== IndyCar ===
For the 2026 season, IndyCar Officiating Inc. was established as a non-profit entity to provide independent officiating for the IndyCar Series. The entity is neutral from IndyCar and the series' owners, Penske Entertainment, which previously performed these tasks themselves. The creation of this organization also helped improved relations with the FIA. On April 21, it was announced that Elkins had joined the organization as its Managing Director of Officiating.

=== Other ventures ===
Elkins serves as president for the Motorsport Safety Foundation, initially joining the organization as its chief operating officer in February 2015. Since 2014, he has served as the president of The Elkins Group, a motorsport consulting firm that works with various high-profile series, including Formula One, Formula E, NASCAR, and the FIA World Endurance Championship. He has served as a board member for International Council of Motorsport Sciences since 2021, and ACCUS-FIA from 2009 to 2015. In 2025, Elkins joined Al Kamel Systems, a motorsport timing and technology company, to serve as the CEO for its North American branch — Al Kamel North America.

== Personal life ==
Born in Indiana, Elkins attended Indiana State University, graduating with a degree in Manufacturing Engineering Technology. He lives in Southern California with his wife and four children.
