= Michael Masi =

Former Formula One race director (born 1978)

- Born: Michael Fausto Masi; 8 June 1978 (age 48); Sydney, Australia
- Years active: 2019–2022
- Known for: FIA race director
- Predecessor: Charlie Whiting
- Successor: Niels Wittich, Eduardo Freitas

Michael Fausto Masi (born 8 June 1978) is an Australian motorsports official who most notably served as Formula One race director from 2019 to 2021. In this role, he oversaw the logistics of a Formula One race weekend, ensuring all cars, tracks, and drivers conform to Fédération Internationale de l'Automobile (FIA) regulations before, during, and after a race. Masi was removed from his position following an FIA analysis into his failure to correctly follow the safety car restart procedure at the 2021 Abu Dhabi Grand Prix.

== Early life and education ==
Masi was born in Sydney, Australia, in 1978 and is of Italian descent. Growing up in the suburbs of Fairfield and Canada Bay, and attended Patrician Brothers' College. He initially studied marketing at TAFE before his roles in motorsport.

== Career ==
=== Early career ===
Masi began his career in motor racing volunteering for Super Touring teams while still at school. He worked as deputy race director in the Supercars touring car racing series and at Rally Australia. In 2018, he was appointed by the FIA as the Formula 2 and Formula 3 deputy race director, and was appointed deputy to F1 race director Charlie Whiting. Masi alternated in this role between Grands Prix with Scot Elkins, who would become the race director for Formula E and the Deutsche Tourenwagen Masters.

=== Formula One ===
Following Whiting's death before the 2019 Australian Grand Prix, Masi took on the role of Formula One race director.

Several of his decisions as race director were subject to scrutiny from drivers, teams, and press. During the 2020 Turkish Grand Prix qualifying session, cars were sent out on track while a crane was still on the track. During the 2021 season, he was required to defend the red flag procedures used during the 2021 Azerbaijan Grand Prix. In the 2021 Belgian Grand Prix, Masi was criticised for running qualifying in dangerous conditions, and then running the race behind the safety car for three laps, allegedly to ensure points were awarded. He was criticized for negotiating with teams to change positions during the 2021 Saudi Arabian Grand Prix. The following week, Masi's failure to apply established rules following a safety car period during the final lap of the 2021 Abu Dhabi Grand Prix and its impact on the championship results was subject of debate.

On 17 February 2022, Masi was removed from his role as Race Director following an FIA investigation into the Abu Dhabi Grand Prix. He was replaced by Niels Wittich and Eduardo Freitas. A new position within the FIA as the Independent Chair of the Supercar Commission was offered to Masi, which he took in August 2022.

On 19 March 2022, the FIA published their official report into the Abu Dhabi controversy, confirming regulation infringements; specifically that "the Race Director called the safety car back into the pit lane without it having completed an additional lap as required by the Formula 1 Sporting Regulations (Article 48.12)". The report concluded that Masi incorrectly applied regulations, in that not all lapped cars had unlapped themselves, and the safety car had not completed the mandatory additional lap before coming back into the pitlane. The FIA official report attributed these matters to "human error".

=== Post-Formula One ===
Masi's decisions in the 2021 Abu Dhabi Grand Prix contributed to Mohammed Ben Sulayem's FIA Presidential campaign platform, which emphasised restructuring and modernising race operations. Ben Sulayem believed changes were necessary to restore public trust.

In July 2022, Masi left the FIA in order to return to Australia and spend more time with his family. In September, Masi was appointed the independent Chairman of the Supercars Commission in Australia. He left this role in September 2025. He was appointed to the board of directors of Karting Australia in December.

Due to abuse and death threats he received after the Abu Dhabi Grand Prix and exhaustion of travelling to different countries as race director, Masi sought help with his mental health.

During the 2023 Australian Grand Prix, Masi sought to meet with Hamilton in an effort to explain his decisions during the 2021 Abu Dhabi Grand Prix. Hamilton chose not to meet Masi, saying there was "nothing to say".

In December 2025, Masi was appointed as the Event Director for the Repco NextGen NZ Championship, which includes the Formula Regional Oceania Trophy.

== See also ==
- Roland Bruynseraede
- Brian Barnhart
