= 2021 Saudi Arabian Grand Prix =

21st round of the 2021 Formula One season

Race 21 of 22 in the 2021 Formula One World Championship
← Previous race	Next race →
- Layout of the Jeddah Corniche Circuit

Race details
- Date: 5 December 2021
- Official name: Formula 1 STC Saudi Arabian Grand Prix 2021
- Location: Jeddah Corniche Circuit, Jeddah, Saudi Arabia
- Course: Temporary street circuit
- Course length: 6.174 km (3.836 miles)
- Distance: 50 laps, 308.450 km (191.662 (Note: There was a 0.250 km (0.155 mi) offset between the start and finish lines.) miles)
- Weather: Clear
- Attendance: 143,000

Pole position
Driver	(United Kingdom) Lewis Hamilton	Mercedes
- Time: 1:27.511

Fastest lap
Driver	(United Kingdom) Lewis Hamilton	Mercedes
- Time: 1:30.734 on lap 47 (lap record)

Podium
First	(United Kingdom) Lewis Hamilton	Mercedes
Second	(Netherlands) Max Verstappen	Red Bull Racing-Honda
Third	(Finland) Valtteri Bottas	Mercedes

The 2021 Saudi Arabian Grand Prix (formally the Formula 1 STC Saudi Arabian Grand Prix 2021) was a Formula One motor race held on 5 December 2021 at the Jeddah Corniche Circuit in Jeddah, Saudi Arabia. It was the 21st and penultimate round of the 2021 Formula One World Championship and the inaugural Saudi Arabian Grand Prix. Mercedes driver Lewis Hamilton won the 50-lap race from the pole position; Max Verstappen of Red Bull Racing finished second, and Hamilton's teammate Valtteri Bottas came in third place.

Hamilton took pole position by recording the fastest lap time of qualifying. Verstappen, his championship rival, was on pace to lap a faster time, but crashed at the final corner on his final flying lap. The race was stopped twice in the first 20 laps due to separate accidents; prior to the second red flag, Verstappen had assumed the lead because the Mercedes drivers made pit stops, but Hamilton attempted to pass Verstappen in turn one, so Verstappen veered off-course to defend his lead. F1 race director Michael Masi made a deal with Red Bull, permitting Verstappen to restart in third place, behind Esteban Ocon and Hamilton.

Verstappen quickly got by the two drivers, but Hamilton gradually built a faster pace and tried to pass him in turn one on lap 37. Verstappen made another aggressive defence and was thus forced to give up his position. However, he braked suddenly in the 26th turn, causing Hamilton to run into his rear. Following another failed defence tactic on lap 42, Verstappen let Hamilton by for good on the next lap. After the race, Verstappen received a five-second time penalty for cutting the second turn and a ten-second time penalty for braking erratically, which did not affect his position.

Verstappen and Hamilton entered the season-ending Abu Dhabi Grand Prix with 369.5 points each in the World Drivers' Championship, the first time since 1974 that the top-two drivers were level on points with one race remaining in an F1 season. Because of Sergio Pérez's involvement in an accident and subsequent retirement, Mercedes widened their gap over Red Bull Racing–Honda in the World Constructors' Championship.

== Background ==
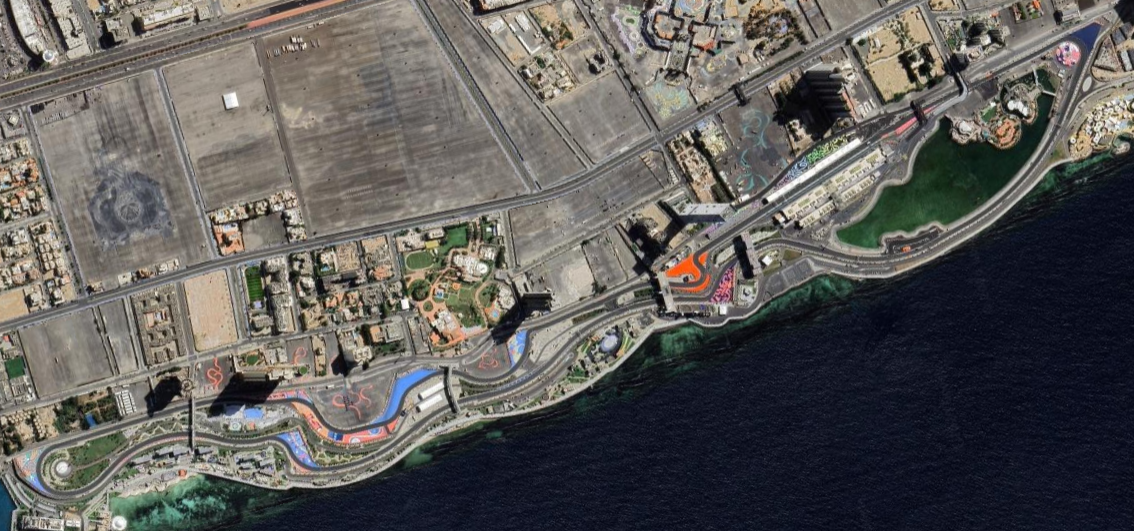
The Jeddah Corniche Circuit (pictured in 2026), where the race was held.

The Saudi Arabian Grand Prix was first announced to be included on the 2021 Formula One World Championship calendar in November 2020 as part of a ten-year partnership between the sport and Saudi Arabia. It was the 21st of 22 rounds on the 2021 schedule. The original date of the race was 28 November, but it was rescheduled to 5 December due to the postponement of the Australian Grand Prix owing to the COVID-19 pandemic. (Note: The Australian Grand Prix was eventually cancelled.) The track at which the Grand Prix took place was the Jeddah Corniche Circuit, a 27-turn, 6.174 km (3.836 mi) street circuit in Jeddah, Saudi Arabia, which was designed by F1 track architect Carsten Tilke. Construction on the circuit began in April 2021 and was concluded days prior to the race. The track was anticipated to be one of the fastest on the F1 schedule, with predicted top speeds of 325 km/h (202 mph). Three detection zones were implemented around the circuit for the cars' drag reduction system (DRS), the first in between turns 17 and 18, the second towards turn 22, and the third towards turn 27, which were intended to encourage overtaking. Tyre supplier Pirelli brought white-banded hard-compound tyres, yellow-banded medium-compound tyres, and red-banded soft-compound tyres.

=== Entries ===
There were 10 teams, each representing a different constructor, that entered two race drivers for the event. One of the 20 drivers, Nikita Mazepin, wound up making their final career start in the Saudi Arabian Grand Prix because he withdrew from the final round of the season—the Abu Dhabi Grand Prix—due to a positive COVID-19 test, and was replaced ahead of the 2022 season after the Russian invasion of Ukraine began in February 2022. Alpine ran with a new livery for their two cars, driven by Fernando Alonso and Esteban Ocon, to commemorate Castrol's 100th race as their sponsor.

=== Championship standings before the race ===
Heading into the race, Max Verstappen led the World Drivers' Championship with 351.5 points, eight more than second-place Lewis Hamilton. Valtteri Bottas was third with 203 points, Sergio Pérez was fourth on 190, and Lando Norris was fifth on 153. The World Constructors' Championship was led by Mercedes on 546.5 points, as Red Bull Racing–Honda stood second on 541.5 points. Behind them, Ferrari, McLaren–Mercedes, and Alpine–Renault rounded out the top-five in the standings with 297.5, 258, and 137 points, respectively.

In the season's previous round, the Qatar Grand Prix, Verstappen overcame a five-place grid penalty to improve to second place by the fourth lap. Although Verstappen gained a crucial bonus point for recording the race's fastest lap, he was unable to challenge Hamilton for the win, causing the gap between the two drivers to decrease from 14 to eight points. With two races left in the season, the deficit between the top-two drivers was the closest since 2010. Each race offered a maximum of 26 points, so Verstappen needed to outscore Hamilton by at least 18 points to clinch the title in Saudi Arabia. Bottas' retirement at Qatar also allowed Red Bull to reel in Mercedes' championship lead from 11 to five points, and with a maximum of 44 points available for the constructors, Mercedes needed to earn at least 40 more points than Red Bull at Saudi Arabia to win the championship.

Verstappen and Hamilton's title fight had brought much media attention as the season progressed, with many fans comparing it to the infamous rivalry between Alain Prost and Ayrton Senna. The two drivers had already collided into each other in three Grands Prix that season (Britain, Italy, and São Paulo), and as it became clear that the title fight would only intensify over the next two weeks, many feared that the championship would be determined by another crash, similar to the 1989 and 1990 Japanese Grand Prix. 1996 World Drivers' Champion Damon Hill, who lost the 1994 title after being hit by Michael Schumacher in that year's Australian Grand Prix, hoped that the Fédération Internationale de l'Automobile (FIA; Formula One's governing body) could "take steps to prevent an unhappy ending to this". Hamilton aimed to win his eighth championship, a feat that no F1 driver had accomplished before, but stated that he felt more relaxed than when he first contended for an F1 title because: "I've been around a long time. It's not my first." Verstappen also held a composed demeanor entering the event, assured that he "(doesn't) need to overthink or stress out about a lot of things to be quick.”

Mercedes and Red Bull had also been at odds over the past two races, beginning with the São Paulo Grand Prix, because Red Bull team principal Christian Horner had claimed that the main plane of the Mercedes' rear wing was flexing backwards in order to reduce drag and increase straight-line speeds, thus giving Hamilton an illegal performance advantage over Verstappen. Mercedes team principal Toto Wolff refuted the accusation and quipped that Horner was "chasing ghosts", which was proven true as the Mercedes' rear wings in São Paulo and Qatar both passed tests conducted by the FIA for their rigidity. Horner's complaints were somewhat tempered because of a decrease in Hamilton's straight-line speed at Qatar, but this was only because Hamilton had used an older engine; Wolff confirmed that Hamilton was to use Mercedes' newest engine unit for Saudi Arabia because the track featured several long straights which required more power than downforce.

=== Saudi Arabia sportswashing accusations ===
The decision to host a race in Saudi Arabia drew condemnation and accusations of sportswashing from several human rights organizations. Felix Jakens, the head of campaigns of Amnesty International UK, warned that the Saudi Arabian Grand Prix would "be part of ongoing efforts to sportswash the country’s abysmal human rights record" and called on the drivers, owners, and teams to speak on the human rights issues within the country, while Human Rights Watch director Minky Worden felt that the race was "part of a cynical strategy to distract from Saudi Arabia’s human rights abuses, detention and torture of human rights defenders and women’s rights activists." A group of British politicians, some of whom were members of the House of Commons and the House of Lords, wrote a letter to F1 chief executive officer (CEO) Stefano Domenicali, urging that he use the Grand Prix as an opportunity to denounce the country's use of death penalties for children and non-violent offenders. Hamilton admitted that he was not comfortable racing in Saudi Arabia because of its human rights violations, but confirmed that he would still don a progress pride flag design on his helmet that he had introduced in the Qatar Grand Prix to raise awareness about the country's laws that illegalize same-sex marriages. Fellow driver Sebastian Vettel invited a handful of female drivers to a local kart track that he rented in order to learn about the discrimination that women face in Saudi Arabia; he considered it a "great way to kick off the weekend".

Several high-ranking figures of F1 held a positive outlook about the upcoming Saudi Arabian Grand Prix despite the criticism. Wolff noted the lack of segregation between men and women who spectated a recent Formula E race at the Riyadh Street Circuit, and Horner felt that teams should not dictate where F1 hosts races and trusted the sport in making decisions that are "right for the interests of the sport". During the weekend of the British Grand Prix in July, race promoter Prince Khalid Al-Faisal told reporters that he met with "a couple of drivers" at Silverstone and was open to talking with any others that had concerns about the event.

=== Death of Frank Williams ===
On 28 November, one week before the race, Williams co-founder and former owner Sir Frank Williams died at the age of 79. Williams, whose team won 16 world championships (seven drivers' and nine constructors' titles) at the time of his death, had not been seen in public since the 2019 British Grand Prix due to his deteriorating health. Several teams sported decals on their cars in tribute to Williams, and a minute of silence took place approximately one hour before the start of the race. After the drivers completed their reconnaissance laps, former Williams driver Damon Hill drove a lap of honour in the FW07, Williams' first championship-winning car used in the 1980 season. Additionally, on the eve of the race weekend, Williams CEO Jost Capito announced that he had tested positive for coronavirus and was therefore forced to miss the weekend with the team.

== Practice ==
There were three 60-minute practice sessions that preceded the race; the first two sessions were held on Friday, 3 December, and the third was on Saturday, 4 December. Hamilton led the first practice session on a dry track on Friday afternoon with a lap time of 1 minute and 29.786 seconds, while Verstappen trailed him by just over five hundredths of a second. Bottas was in third, with Pierre Gasly in fourth and Antonio Giovinazzi in fifth. The session went without any major accident, but towards its end, Ocon and Verstappen went off the track and nearly collided in turn one as the former attempted to let the latter by.

As night set over the circuit, Hamilton topped the time charts of the second practice session with a 1-minute, 29.018-second lap, although he and several other drivers locked his brakes at turn one and subsequently went off in the next corner. Late in the session, Hamilton also drove off-track to avoid a spinning Mazepin at the exit of turn two. Bottas was second-quickest, six hundredths of a second slower, and led the session until Hamilton's lap. Both Mercedes drivers set their fastest times on the medium-compound tyres. Gasly, Verstappen, and Alonso occupied positions three through five. The session was brought to an early end when Charles Leclerc lost rear grip entering turn 22 and slammed a barrier at 241.4 km/h (150.0 mph), destroying the right side and rear wing of his car. Leclerc was taken to the circuit's medical centre but was quickly released without injury. Ferrari confirmed that Leclerc's chassis and power unit were still usable and repaired the car overnight, which Leclerc thanked them for. In response to the slow traffic issues during Friday's sessions, F1 race director Michael Masi announced that drivers were no longer allowed to prepare for their flying laps in between turns 23 and 25.

The third practice session was held under warm weather on Saturday afternoon. Verstappen lapped the quickest time at 1 minute and 28.100 seconds, ahead of Hamilton, Pérez, Yuki Tsunoda, and Gasly. During the session, Hamilton failed to yield when double yellow flags were waved, and later impeded Mazepin in turn eight, forcing Mazepin to steer off-course. Hamilton was resultantly summoned by the stewards one hour before qualifying. No further action was taken for ignoring the double yellow flags because it was ruled that they were triggered accidentally and they were not shown where Hamilton was on the circuit, though Hamilton was issued his second reprimand of the season for his impedance because his team had not informed him that Mazepin was closing in on him. Mercedes were also fined €25,000.

== Qualifying ==
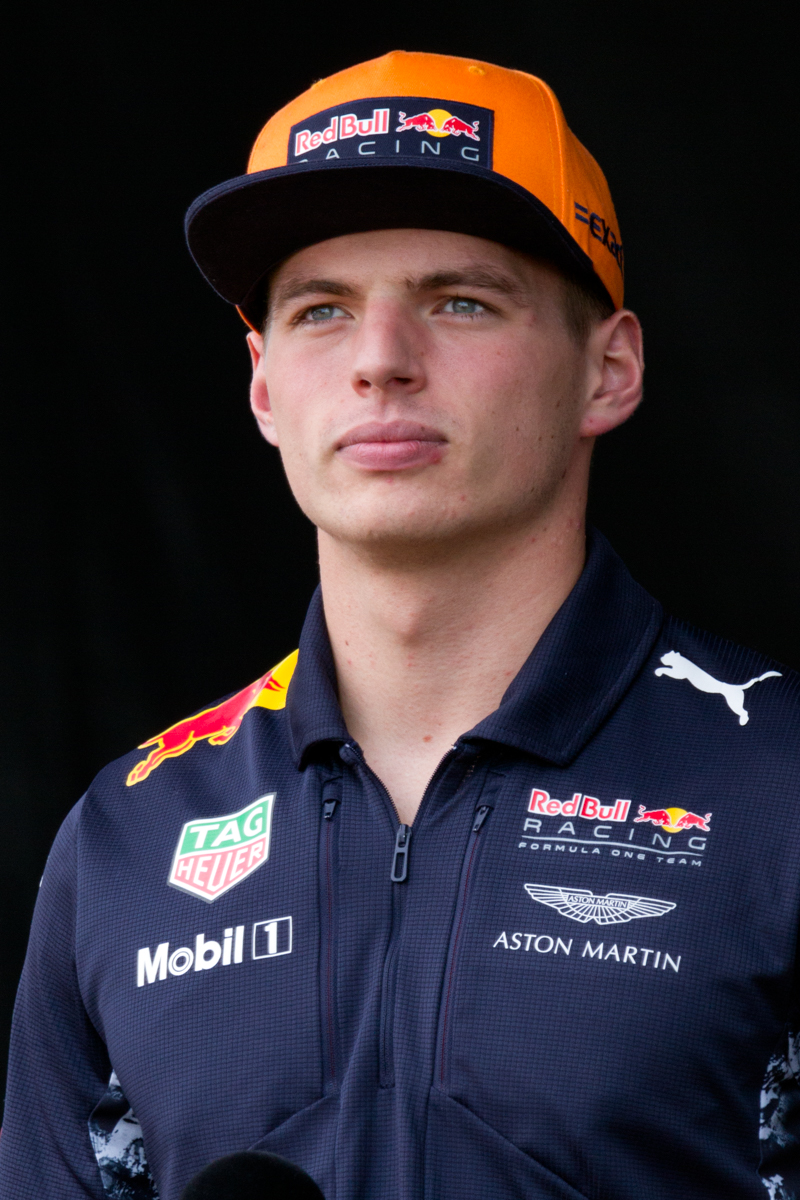
Max Verstappen (pictured in 2017) started in third after crashing on his last flying lap.

Qualifying took place under dry conditions on Saturday evening and lasted for 60 minutes. As per FIA rules, the qualifying session was split into three segments: the first segment (Q1) would last for 18 minutes and determine positions 16th through 20th. The 107% rule was in effect, requiring drivers to set a lap time within 107 per cent of the fastest time in order to qualify. After a seven-minute break, the second segment (Q2) was to last for 15 minutes and determine positions 11th through 15th. Following another eight-minute break, the top-ten starting positions would be set by the third segment (Q3), lasting 12 minutes.

Qualifying began with Pérez taking top spot of Q1 with a time of 1 minute, 28.021 seconds. Nicholas Latifi was unable to qualify higher than 16th because he had skidded off-course at the fourth turn. Aston Martin drivers Vettel and Lance Stroll were both blocked by traffic during their qualifying runs, forcing them to start 17th and 18th, respectively. The two Haas cars of Mick Schumacher and Mazepin took the final two starting positions. Hamilton led at the end of Q2 with a 1-minute, 27.712 second-lap. Daniel Ricciardo, in 11th, felt that his qualifying result did not reflect his pace and was only hindered because he damaged his car's floor after running over a kerb. Kimi Räikkönen (who slightly hit a slow Bottas on his last flying lap), Alonso, and George Russell occupied the next three positions. 15th-placed Carlos Sainz Jr. struggled with his car's handling after spinning at the exit of turn ten and brushing the wall with the right-side endplate of his rear wing, later declaring that the car was "undrivable".

The Q3 segment began with Hamilton sliding off-course in turn two and aborting his opening attempt. After making a pit stop to make alterations to his front wing, he set the fastest lap of the session, timed at 1 minute, 27.511 seconds. Verstappen, seeking to improve on Hamilton's time, nearly clipped the wall while exiting turn two, but recovered to set the quickest times of the first two sectors and was over two tenths of a second quicker than Hamilton. Heading into the final corner, however, he locked up his front-left tyre and, after going wide and applying the throttle, he lost control of the rear and collided with the wall, causing his suspension to break. This dropped Verstappen to third place and ensured Hamilton his fifth pole position of the season and the 103rd of his career. (Note: After this race, Hamilton began the longest streak of his career without earning a pole position, spanning 33 races and 595 days, which ended in the 2023 Hungarian Grand Prix.) Bottas took second to secure a 1–2 qualifying result for Mercedes. It marked the 100th consecutive race in which he qualified in the top-ten, a feat that only Prost and Senna had previously achieved in F1 history. Leclerc, Pérez, Gasly, Norris, Tsunoda, Ocon, and Giovinazzi occupied the last seven positions in the top ten. After qualifying, Red Bull motorsport advisor Helmut Marko did not rule out swapping Verstappen's gearbox if it was damaged, though no change was ultimately made.

=== Qualifying classification ===
The fastest lap times of each segment are denoted in bold.

Pos.	No.	Driver	Constructor	Qualifying times			Grid
Pos.	No.	Driver	Constructor	Q1	Q2	Q3	Grid
1	44	(United Kingdom) Lewis Hamilton	Mercedes	1:28.466	**1:27.712**	**1:27.511**	1
2	77	(Finland) Valtteri Bottas	Mercedes	1:28.067	1:28.054	1:27.622	2
3	33	(Netherlands) Max Verstappen	Red Bull Racing-Honda	1:28.285	1:27.953	1:27.653	3
4	16	(Monaco) Charles Leclerc	Ferrari	1:28.310	1:28.459	1:28.054	4
5	11	(Mexico) Sergio Pérez	Red Bull Racing-Honda	**1:28.021**	1:27.946	1:28.123	5
6	10	(France) Pierre Gasly	AlphaTauri-Honda	1:28.401	1:28.314	1:28.125	6
7	4	(United Kingdom) Lando Norris	McLaren-Mercedes	1:28.338	1:28.344	1:28.180	7
8	22	(Japan) Yuki Tsunoda	AlphaTauri-Honda	1:28.503	1:28.222	1:28.442	8
9	31	(France) Esteban Ocon	Alpine-Renault	1:28.752	1:28.564	1:28.647	9
10	99	(Italy) Antonio Giovinazzi	Alfa Romeo Racing-Ferrari	1:28.889	1:28.616	1:28.754	10
11	3	(Australia) Daniel Ricciardo	McLaren-Mercedes	1:28.216	1:28.668	N/A	11
12	7	(Finland) Kimi Räikkönen	Alfa Romeo Racing-Ferrari	1:28.856	1:28.885	N/A	12
13	14	(Spain) Fernando Alonso	Alpine-Renault	1:28.944	1:28.920	N/A	13
14	63	(United Kingdom) George Russell	Williams-Mercedes	1:28.926	1:29.054	N/A	14
15	55	(Spain) Carlos Sainz Jr.	Ferrari	1:28.236	1:53.652	N/A	15
16	6	(Canada) Nicholas Latifi	Williams-Mercedes	1:29.177	N/A	N/A	16
17	5	(Germany) Sebastian Vettel	Aston Martin-Mercedes	1:29.198	N/A	N/A	17
18	18	(Canada) Lance Stroll	Aston Martin-Mercedes	1:29.368	N/A	N/A	18
19	47	(Germany) Mick Schumacher	Haas-Ferrari	1:29.464	N/A	N/A	19
20	9	(Russian Automobile Federation) Nikita Mazepin (Note: Nikita Mazepin is Russian, but he competed as a neutral competitor using the designation RAF (Russian Automobile Federation), as the Court of Arbitration for Sport upheld a ban on Russia competing at World Championships. The ban was implemented by the World Anti-Doping Agency in response to the state-sponsored doping program of Russian athletes.)	Haas-Ferrari	1:30.473	N/A	N/A	20
107% time: 1:34.182

== Race ==
The weather conditions towards the start of the race were clear of any rain, with air temperatures at 29 °C (84 °F) and track temperatures at 32 °C (90 °F). Approximately 143,000 spectators attended the race, which began at 20:30 Arabian Standard Time (UTC+03:00) on Sunday, 5 December, and was to be held over a distance of 50 laps and 308.450 km (191.662 mi). Hamilton maintained his pole position advantage to lead the first lap as the top-four positions remained unchanged. Behind them, Ocon and Tsunoda's wheels made slight contact in turn one, as did the wheels of Russell and Stroll in turn seven, while Sainz improved from 15th to 12th by the end of the first lap. Hamilton pulled 1.5 seconds clear of Bottas until lap ten, when Schumacher smashed into the barriers at turn 22 and was forced to retire from the race. This prompted the safety car to be deployed for the first time, and both Mercedes drivers entered the pit lane to change their medium-compound tyres for hard-compound tyres. On his in lap, Bottas held up Verstappen until he was seven seconds behind Hamilton, which angered the Red Bull team. Verstappen elected to stay on-track and therefore assumed the lead, with Hamilton in second and Bottas in third, before the red flag was issued on lap 13, which stopped the race to allow marshals to repair the barriers. The decision infuriated Hamilton because the rules permitted Verstappen to change his tyres during the stoppage.

The red flag was withdrawn after nearly 20 minutes, and a standing start was ordered by FIA officials. During the ensuing formation lap, Verstappen complained through radio communications that Hamilton was farther than ten car lengths behind him and called for a penalty. Hamilton sped off the grid quicker than Verstappen entering the first corner, but Verstappen defended his position by skipping the second turn. This forced Hamilton to steer wide, letting Ocon overtake him for second place. Approaching turn three, Pérez was spun from behind by Leclerc, and Mazepin struck the rear of Russell's car as the field stacked up in response to Pérez's incident. The four-car accident resulted in a second 20-minute red-flag period, during which Michael Masi proposed an offer to Red Bull sporting director Jonathan Wheatley that Verstappen swap places with Ocon rather than involving stewards and potentially getting a penalty for cutting the second turn. Red Bull negotiated with Masi and eventually accepted the offer, which had been amended to place Ocon in the lead and Hamilton in second.

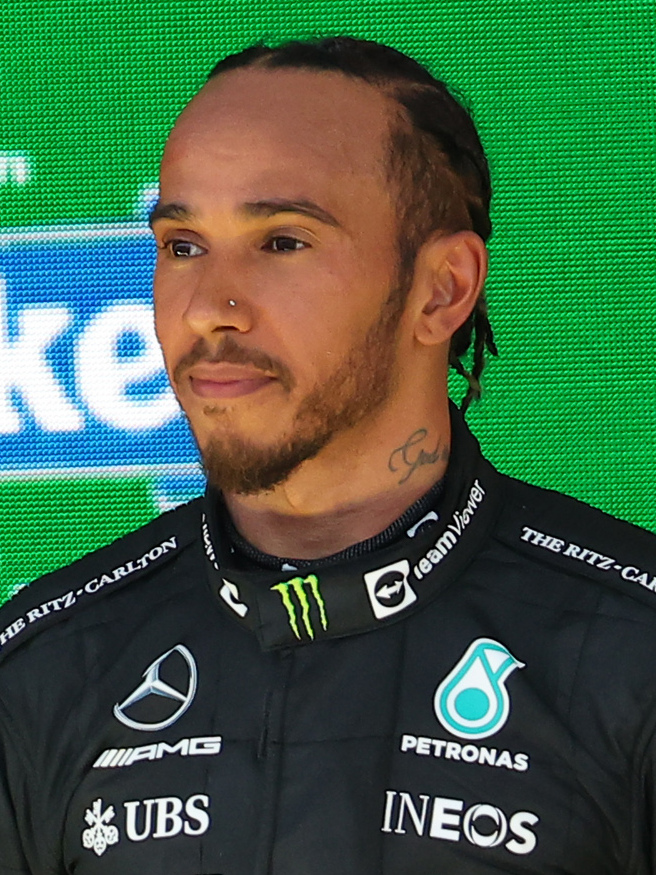
Lewis Hamilton (pictured in 2022) won the race despite a controversial accident with Verstappen on lap 37.

At the third standing start on lap 17, Verstappen—who was driving on new medium-compound tyres—dived to the inside of Hamilton in turn one to take the lead. Hamilton briefly lost second place to Ocon before overtaking him to reclaim the position the following lap. While Verstappen reported his car's decreasing power as his battery recharged, Hamilton recorded several fastest laps on his hard-compound tyres before the race was interrupted by a virtual safety car (VSC) on lap 23: Vettel and Tsunoda had collided in turn two, and the latter's front wing needed to be retrieved from the run-off area. Tsunoda was later given a five-second time penalty for causing the accident. The race returned to green-flag conditions at the end of lap 24, but two more VSCs were issued on the 28th and 29th laps for debris on the circuit after Vettel and Räikkönen clashed in the fourth corner. The third VSC lasted until lap 33, by which point Verstappen amassed a 1.2-second advantage over Hamilton. Three laps later, a VSC was prompted for the fourth time to recover debris in the 14th turn.

As the VSC came to an end on the 37th lap, Hamilton was within DRS range of Verstappen and used his slipstream to overtake him on the outside line heading into the first turn. Refusing to cede the top position, Verstappen steered wide, forcing him and Hamilton off-course, and skipped the second turn entirely to extend his lead over Hamilton. Red Bull instructed Verstappen to let Hamilton by prior to the last turn in order to gain DRS for the upcoming straight. Verstappen slowed dramatically at the 26th turn, and Hamilton—unaware of what Verstappen was doing—followed suit until Verstappen suddenly applied his brakes. Hamilton attempted to take evasive action by swerving left, but ran into the left-rear tyre of Verstappen's car, damaging the right-front portion of his wing in the process. Verstappen continued to hold the lead, while a furious Hamilton immediately relayed to his team that Verstappen had "brake-tested" him. At the Mercedes garage, Wolff reacted to the collision with anger, shouting "fuck" twice and slamming his headphones against a desk. Over the next six laps, Mercedes argued with Masi over who caused the collision, while Bottas overtook Ricciardo for fourth place at turn one on the 40th lap.

Verstappen finally let Hamilton pass him ahead of the final corner on lap 42, but subsequently lunged down the inside line with his DRS to reclaim the lead once more. The stewards then handed Verstappen a five-second time penalty for leaving the track. The following lap, Verstappen handed the lead back to Hamilton at the final corner, and Hamilton nearly ran Verstappen off-track, which earned Mercedes a warning that Hamilton was close to receiving a black flag for dangerous driving. From then on, Verstappen's pace gradually declined as his medium-compound tyres were wearing out. Hamilton, meanwhile, continued reeling off a series of fastest laps (including an overall top time of 1 minute, 30.734 seconds on the 47th lap) to take his eighth win of the season and his 103rd career victory in Formula One. (Note: After this race, Hamilton began the longest winless streak of his career, spanning 56 races and 945 days. It eventually ended via his victory in the 2024 British Grand Prix.) Verstappen took second place, 11.825 seconds in arrears, with Bottas taking third place after deploying his DRS to charge past Ocon on the front straight by 0.102 seconds. (Note: This was the 67th and, as of 2026, the most recent podium finish of Bottas' career.) Ricciardo, Gasly, Leclerc, Sainz, Giovinazzi, and Norris assumed the last points-scoring positions. The remaining classified finishers were Stroll, Latifi, Alonso, Tsunoda (who lost a position because of his earlier penalty), and Räikkönen.

=== Post-race ===
Following the race, Verstappen was informed through radio that he had been voted the Driver of the Day by the fans, to which he stated, "Luckily the fans have a clear mind about racing because what happened today is unbelievable. I'm just trying to race and this sport lately is more about penalties than racing. For me this is not Formula One, but at least the fans enjoyed it. I gave it all today but clearly not quick enough. But still, happy with second." Verstappen walked off the podium after the national anthems of the top-three drivers concluded and did not spray champagne with the two Mercedes drivers. Hamilton told Sky Sports reporters that Verstappen was one of the few competitors in his 28-year racing career whom he felt drove "over the limit", commenting: "I've avoided collision on so many occasions with the guy and I don't always mind being the one that does that because you live to fight another day, which I obviously did."

Hamilton and Verstappen were both summoned to the stewards for violating the FIA International Sporting Code. At 01:36 local time the day after the race, the FIA issued a statement revealing that they had given Verstappen an additional ten-second time penalty for the lap-37 incident (which did not affect his finishing position) and two penalty points on his super license. They cited Verstappen's sudden braking at the 26th turn, which resulted in a deceleration force of 2.4 g (23.5 m/s²), and further explained: "Whilst accepting that (Hamilton) could have overtaken (Verstappen) when that car first slowed, we understand why he (and (Verstappen)) did not want to be the first to cross the DRS. However, the sudden breaking by (Verstappen) was determined by the Stewards to be erratic and hence the predominant cause of the collision and hence the standard penalty of 10 seconds for this type of incident, is imposed."

The decision was met with frustration from the Red Bull team: speaking to Motorsport.com, Christian Horner compared the actions of Michael Masi to "being at the local market with a bit of trading for position versus penalty", and added: "I think we’re over-regulated. There’s rules about 10 car lengths, then the formation lap isn’t a formation lap if it’s a restart. It feels that there’s too many rules. It felt like today the sport missed [Masi's predecessor] Charlie Whiting." Helmut Marko expressed his belief that Verstappen was being treated unfairly by the FIA stewards, "Our engineers are preparing that we can prove Max was constant with his braking, he didn't brake test like Hamilton said. Then he crashed into our car, he unfortunately put two cuts in the rear tyre. That was so severe that we couldn't attack anymore. We had to take speed out." In defense of the penalty, Formula One chief Ross Brawn said that Masi dealt with the situation in a pragmatic way. Masi commented: "I wouldn't call it a deal, as from a race director's perspective I have no authority to instruct the teams to do anything in that situation. I can give them an offer, [I have] the ability to do that but the choice is theirs. The stewards are obviously empowered to give penalties, but I can give them my perspective. That's why I offered them the ability to give that position up." Wolff, recognizing the tension between Hamilton and Verstappen, hoped that the officiating in Saudi Arabia would force the two drivers to avoid a potentially championship-deciding collision at Abu Dhabi.

The inaugural Saudi Arabia Grand Prix received mixed but mostly positive reviews from pundits. Andrew Benson of BBC Sport wrote: "Once the dust has settled and the debris has been picked through, that's the fundamental conclusion from the craziest and most dramatic race yet in a Formula 1 season that has been packed full of them. The Saudi Arabian Grand Prix will go down in history as one of the most remarkable races F1 has ever seen." The race was described as "one of the most bizarre races in Formula 1 history" by Autosport journalist Charles Bradley, and "dirty" and "absolutely crazy" by Sky Sports broadcaster Martin Brundle, who also felt that Verstappen's driving standards were "too much".

The Jeddah Corniche Circuit, however, was panned by drivers and fans alike for its emphasis on full-throttle racing and lack of braking zones, creating safety concerns. Russell, director of the Grand Prix Drivers' Association, opined that the accident that took him out of the race was "pretty inevitable" because of the narrow straight after turn two and said that the track was "incredibly exhilarating and exciting track to drive but it's lacking a lot from a safety perspective and a racing perspective." Pérez stated that the circuit was "too dangerous without a real reason." Brundle expressed a similar sentiment in a Sky Sports article: "I'm not sure that being the fastest ever street circuit is a good target, there are many high risk low skill blind curves, and it's wide and open enough to see the kind of shunts with the Leclerc, Perez, Russell, Mazepin combo that a street circuit wouldn't normally generate." Ahead of the 2022 Saudi Arabian Grand Prix, the barriers at several corners were moved back to improve driver visibility and widen the track.

The final race result meant that Verstappen and Hamilton had each amassed 369.5 points and were level for the World Drivers' Championship lead entering the final round of the season; it was only the second time in F1 history that such a scenario had materialized, the first time occurring in the 1974 season. Bottas was in third with 218 points and Pérez stood fourth on 190, while Leclerc advanced to fifth place in the standings over Norris with 158. Mercedes, on 587.5 points, extended their advantage in the World Constructors' Championship to 28 over Red Bull Racing–Honda because of Pérez's early retirement. Ferrari (307.5 points), McLaren–Mercedes (269 points), and Alpine–Renault (149 points) assumed the remaining top-five positions in the standings.

=== Race classification ===
Pos.	No.	Driver	Constructor	Laps	Time/Retired	Grid	Points
1	44	(United Kingdom) Lewis Hamilton	Mercedes	50	2:06:15.185	1	26^{1}
2	33	(Netherlands) Max Verstappen	Red Bull Racing-Honda	50	+21.825^{2}	3	18
3	77	(Finland) Valtteri Bottas	Mercedes	50	+27.531	2	15
4	31	(France) Esteban Ocon	Alpine-Renault	50	+27.633	9	12
5	3	(Australia) Daniel Ricciardo	McLaren-Mercedes	50	+40.121	11	10
6	10	(France) Pierre Gasly	AlphaTauri-Honda	50	+41.613	6	8
7	16	(Monaco) Charles Leclerc	Ferrari	50	+44.475	4	6
8	55	(Spain) Carlos Sainz Jr.	Ferrari	50	+46.606	15	4
9	99	(Italy) Antonio Giovinazzi	Alfa Romeo Racing-Ferrari	50	+58.505	10	2
10	4	(United Kingdom) Lando Norris	McLaren-Mercedes	50	+1:01.358	7	1
11	18	(Canada) Lance Stroll	Aston Martin-Mercedes	50	+1:17.212	18	
12	6	(Canada) Nicholas Latifi	Williams-Mercedes	50	+1:23.249	16	
13	14	(Spain) Fernando Alonso	Alpine-Renault	49	+1 lap	13	
14	22	(Japan) Yuki Tsunoda	AlphaTauri-Honda	49	+1 lap^{3}	8	
15	7	(Finland) Kimi Räikkönen	Alfa Romeo Racing-Ferrari	49	+1 lap	12	
Ret	5	(Germany) Sebastian Vettel	Aston Martin-Mercedes	44	Collision damage	17	
Ret	11	(Mexico) Sergio Pérez	Red Bull Racing-Honda	14	Collision	5	
Ret	9	(Russian Automobile Federation) Nikita Mazepin	Haas-Ferrari	14	Collision	20	
Ret	63	(United Kingdom) George Russell	Williams-Mercedes	14	Collision	14	
Ret	47	(Germany) Mick Schumacher	Haas-Ferrari	8	Accident	19	

Notes

- ^1 – Includes one bonus point for setting the fastest lap of the race.
- ^2 – Max Verstappen received a five-second time penalty for leaving the track and gaining an advantage. He also received a ten-second time penalty after the race for causing a collision with Lewis Hamilton. His final position was not affected by the penalties.
- ^3 – Yuki Tsunoda finished 13th, but received a five-second time penalty for causing a collision with Sebastian Vettel.

== Championship standings after the race ==
**Drivers' Championship standings**

	Pos.	Driver	Points
Unchanged	1	(Netherlands) **Max Verstappen***	369.5
Unchanged	2	(United Kingdom) **Lewis Hamilton***	369.5
Unchanged	3	(Finland) Valtteri Bottas	218
Unchanged	4	(Mexico) Sergio Pérez	190
1	5	(Monaco) Charles Leclerc	158

**Constructors' Championship standings**

	Pos.	Constructor	Points
Unchanged	1	(Germany) **Mercedes***	587.5
Unchanged	2	(Austria) **Red Bull Racing-Honda***	559.5
Unchanged	3	(Italy) Ferrari	307.5
Unchanged	4	(United Kingdom) McLaren-Mercedes	269
Unchanged	5	(France) Alpine-Renault	149

- Note: Only the top five positions are included for both sets of standings.
- Competitors in bold and marked with an asterisk still had a mathematical chance of winning the Championship.
- Max Verstappen was ahead of Lewis Hamilton courtesy of having won more races (nine compared to eight).

== See also ==
- 2021 Jeddah Formula 2 round

== Notes ==
Previous race: 2021 Qatar Grand Prix	FIA Formula One World Championship; 2021 season	Next race: 2021 Abu Dhabi Grand Prix
Previous race: None	Saudi Arabian Grand Prix	Next race: 2022 Saudi Arabian Grand Prix
