= 2021 Abu Dhabi Grand Prix =

Final round of the 2021 Formula One season

Race 22 of 22 in the 2021 Formula One World Championship
← Previous race
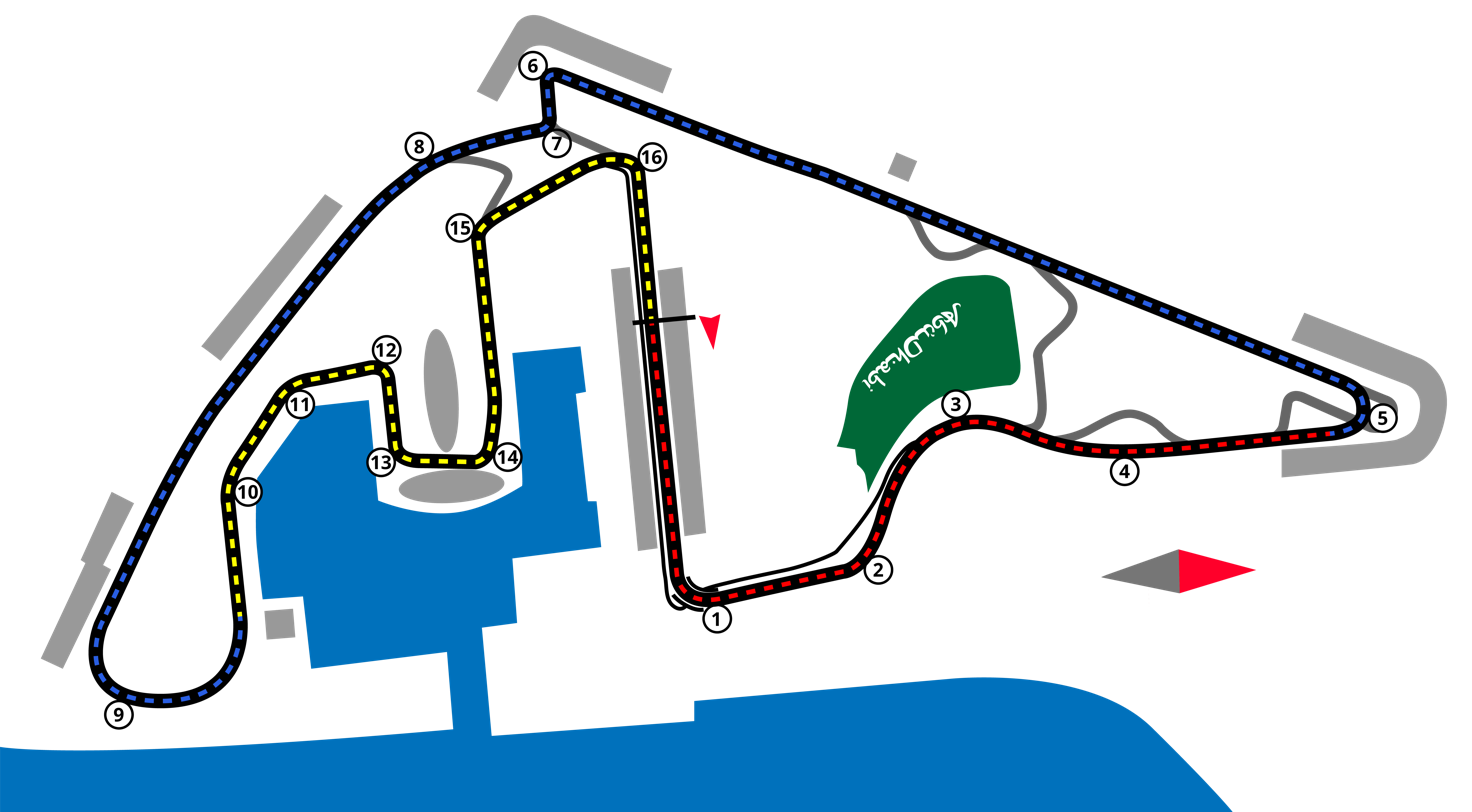

Race details
- Date: 12 December 2021
- Official name: Formula 1 Etihad Airways Abu Dhabi Grand Prix 2021
- Location: Yas Marina Circuit, Abu Dhabi, United Arab Emirates
- Course: Permanent racing facility
- Course length: 5.281 km (3.281 miles)
- Distance: 58 laps, 306.183 km (190.253 miles)
- Weather: Clear
- Attendance: 153,000

Pole position
Driver	(Netherlands) Max Verstappen	Red Bull Racing-Honda
- Time: 1:22.109

Fastest lap
Driver	(Netherlands) Max Verstappen	Red Bull Racing-Honda
- Time: 1:26.103 on lap 39

Podium
First	(Netherlands) Max Verstappen	Red Bull Racing-Honda
Second	(United Kingdom) Lewis Hamilton	Mercedes
Third	(Spain) Carlos Sainz Jr.	Ferrari

The 2021 Abu Dhabi Grand Prix was a Formula One motor race held on 12 December 2021 at the Yas Marina Circuit in Abu Dhabi, United Arab Emirates and the 13th edition of the Abu Dhabi Grand Prix. Contested over 58 laps, it was the twenty-second and final round of the 2021 Formula One World Championship. The race decided both the Drivers' and Constructors' championships; Max Verstappen of the Red Bull Racing team and Lewis Hamilton of the Mercedes-AMG Petronas team both entered the race on 369.5 points, with Verstappen clinching his maiden Drivers' title while Mercedes-AMG Petronas won a record-breaking eighth consecutive Constructors' championship.

Hamilton had led most of the race and appeared on course to win his eighth title. Verstappen overtook Hamilton on the final lap after a controversial safety car restart in the last moments of the race. The ensuing dispute stemmed from race director Michael Masi's handling of the safety car, which was seen by some as inconsistent with usual race procedures and sparked a wide debate on whether it was influenced by the closeness of the championship battle and the spectacle, as well as the human element of the decisions. Mercedes immediately protested the race result, which the stewards heard and dismissed. Mercedes had the option to appeal the outcome to the FIA International Court of Appeal, but did not do so.

The FIA, the governing authority of the sport, subsequently conducted an inquiry into the race, confirming the race and the championship results. It concluded that the rules had been ambiguous and the safety car regulations required clarification. The FIA issued a press statement stating that race director Michael Masi had acted "in good faith and to the best of his knowledge given the difficult circumstances". The inquiry lead to a clarification of the safety car regulations, communications between the teams and race control were limited. The role of the race director was restructured, with Masi being replaced by two new race directors who were to respectively assume full race director responsibility at different events across the Formula One calendar.

The Grand Prix was the final race for 2007 world champion Kimi Räikkönen; the then 42-year-old Finn retired from Formula One after a two-decade career spanning a then-record 349 Grand Prix starts. This was also the final race for Honda as a works power unit supplier until the 2026 Australian Grand Prix in partnership with Aston Martin.

== Background ==
The race was originally scheduled to take place on 5 December, but was rescheduled to 12 December after the postponement of the Australian Grand Prix due to the COVID-19 pandemic. Its original date was eventually taken by the Saudi Arabian Grand Prix while the Australian race was cancelled and replaced by the Qatar Grand Prix. It thus became the 22nd and last race of the 2021 season.

=== Circuit modification ===
The Yas Marina Circuit underwent a layout change that shortened the track in order to increase top speeds and overtaking opportunities. The chicane after turn 4 was removed, and the turn 5 hairpin (turn 7 before redevelopment) was widened. The four corner sequence of turns which were turns 11–14 became one single banked turn 9. The radii of turns 12–15 (previously 17–20) were increased to allow cars to carry more speed. The changes to turn 15 allowed cars to be able to travel flat out through the corner.

=== Tyres ===
Sole tyre supplier Pirelli provided the C3, C4, and C5 tyre compounds—the softest selections available—for use in dry conditions.

=== Entrants ===
Jack Aitken participated for Williams in the first practice session in place of George Russell. Nikita Mazepin tested positive for COVID-19 after qualifying, forcing his withdrawal from the race; he was not replaced.

The Grand Prix marked the last Formula One race for 2007 world champion Kimi Räikkönen, who had announced his intention of retiring at the end of the 2021 season a few months earlier, ending his Formula One career after 19 seasons to move to NASCAR Cup Series. As of 2025, it is also the last race of Antonio Giovinazzi, who moved to Formula E, and Mazepin, whose contract was terminated following the 2022 Russian invasion of Ukraine and the cancellation of Uralkali's title sponsorship. It was also the final race for Russell and Valtteri Bottas at Williams and Mercedes-AMG, respectively, as they moved to Mercedes and Alfa Romeo Racing.

Bottas raced with a special helmet for the occasion, featuring photos of all the moments he spent at Mercedes, and he sported a special set of blue racing overalls. Alpine featured the words "El Plan" in both their cars referencing a popular Internet meme. This race also marked the last race for Honda as official engine supplier, as Red Bull Racing and AlphaTauri raced with Red Bull Powertrains from 2022, until their return at the 2026 Australian Grand Prix with Aston Martin.

=== Championship battle before the race and title permutations ===
Title rivals Max Verstappen (Red Bull Racing) and Lewis Hamilton (Mercedes-AMG) both entered the round with 369.5 points, leaving the championship contenders level on points for the final round for the first time since 1974 and only the second time in the sport's history. This meant the driver who scored the most points would win the championship; if both drivers had scored an equal amount of points, Verstappen would have won the championship owing to having more race wins (nine to Hamilton's eight prior to the race). The Drivers' Championship was decided in the final round for the 30th time and the first time since 2016.

In the Constructors' Championship, with 44 points on the table for every team, Mercedes led with 587.5 points, 28 ahead of Red Bull on 559.5; this was the first time since 2008 that the final round of the season decided the Constructors' Championship. In the midfield, Scuderia Ferrari led McLaren in the battle for third place by a margin of 38.5 points.

Acrimonious on-track battles throughout the season led to concerns that one of the drivers might cause a deliberate in-race collision in an attempt to win the championship. Historically, the 1989 championship battle between McLaren teammates Ayrton Senna and Alain Prost was decided by such an incident at the Japanese Grand Prix; the 1990 championship rematch, with Prost now at Ferrari, ended in Senna's favour with another deliberate collision at the Suzuka race; Michael Schumacher's collision with Damon Hill at the 1994 Australian Grand Prix took the Briton out of title contention in the 1994 season; and a collision caused by Schumacher with Jacques Villeneuve at the 1997 European Grand Prix led to the German driver's disqualification from the 1997 season. In response to such concerns, race director Michael Masi warned that Verstappen or Hamilton could be subject to further sanctions from the FIA, the sport's governing body, if one of them decided to manufacture a deliberate collision in an attempt to engineer a favourable championship result, up to and including championship disqualification or future race bans.

== Practice ==
Three practice sessions were scheduled over the course of the weekend. The first session took place at 13:30 local time (UTC+04:00) on Friday 10 December. The second session took place at 17:00. The third session took place at 14:00 on Saturday, 11 December. The first practice session passed without incident and ended with Verstappen setting the fastest time, followed by Bottas and Hamilton. The second practice session ended with Hamilton fastest by 0.3 seconds to second-placed Esteban Ocon, while Bottas was third fastest ahead of Verstappen, 0.6 seconds behind Hamilton. Räikkönen crashed at turn 14 just as the session was concluding, but was unhurt.

== Qualifying ==
Qualifying started at 17:00 local time on Saturday, 11 December. The first qualifying session was briefly suspended after Mick Schumacher collided with a bollard but was resumed without further incident, with the Mercedes drivers Hamilton and Bottas recording the fastest times. In the second session, initial flying laps on medium-compound tyres gave Hamilton a four-millisecond advantage over Red Bull Racing driver Verstappen. A lock-up on his second flying lap led to Verstappen's return to the pits for soft tyres. At the end of the session, Verstappen had improved to take first place on the timesheets. Having set the time on the faster soft-compound tyres he was locked to starting the race on Sunday with them, as Hamilton was likewise locked into using his more durable medium-compound tyres. In the third and final qualifying session, Verstappen was able to use the slipstream of his teammate Sergio Pérez to secure pole position, with Hamilton taking the second spot on the grid.

=== Qualifying classification ===
Pos.	No.	Driver	Constructor	Qualifying times			Final grid
Pos.	No.	Driver	Constructor	Q1	Q2	Q3	Final grid
1	33	(Netherlands) Max Verstappen	Red Bull Racing-Honda	1:23.322	1:22.800	1:22.109	1
2	44	(United Kingdom) Lewis Hamilton	Mercedes	1:22.845	1:23.145	1:22.480	2
3	4	(United Kingdom) Lando Norris	McLaren-Mercedes	1:23.553	1:23.256	1:22.931	3
4	11	(Mexico) Sergio Pérez	Red Bull Racing-Honda	1:23.350	1:23.135	1:22.947	4
5	55	(Spain) Carlos Sainz Jr.	Ferrari	1:23.624	1:23.174	1:22.992	5
6	77	(Finland) Valtteri Bottas	Mercedes	1:23.117	1:23.246	1:23.036	6
7	16	(Monaco) Charles Leclerc	Ferrari	1:23.467	1:23.202	1:23.122	7
8	22	(Japan) Yuki Tsunoda	AlphaTauri-Honda	1:23.428	1:23.404	1:23.220	8
9	31	(France) Esteban Ocon	Alpine-Renault	1:23.764	1:23.420	1:23.389	9
10	3	(Australia) Daniel Ricciardo	McLaren-Mercedes	1:23.829	1:23.448	1:23.409	10
11	14	(Spain) Fernando Alonso	Alpine-Renault	1:23.846	1:23.460	N/A	11
12	10	(France) Pierre Gasly	AlphaTauri-Honda	1:23.489	1:24.043	N/A	12
13	18	(Canada) Lance Stroll	Aston Martin-Mercedes	1:24.061	1:24.066	N/A	13
14	99	(Italy) Antonio Giovinazzi	Alfa Romeo Racing-Ferrari	1:24.118	1:24.251	N/A	14
15	5	(Germany) Sebastian Vettel	Aston Martin-Mercedes	1:24.225	1:24.305	N/A	15
16	6	(Canada) Nicholas Latifi	Williams-Mercedes	1:24.338	N/A	N/A	16
17	63	(United Kingdom) George Russell	Williams-Mercedes	1:24.423	N/A	N/A	17
18	7	(Finland) Kimi Räikkönen	Alfa Romeo Racing-Ferrari	1:24.779	N/A	N/A	18
19	47	(Germany) Mick Schumacher	Haas-Ferrari	1:24.906	N/A	N/A	19
20	9	(Russian Automobile Federation) Nikita Mazepin (Note: Nikita Mazepin is Russian, but he competed as a neutral competitor using the designation RAF (Russian Automobile Federation), as the Court of Arbitration for Sport upheld a ban on Russia competing at World Championships. The ban was implemented by the World Anti-Doping Agency in response to the state-sponsored doping program of Russian athletes.)	Haas-Ferrari	1:25.685	N/A	N/A	—^{a}
107% time: 1:28.644

Notes

- ^a – Nikita Mazepin qualified 20th, but he withdrew before the race as he tested positive for coronavirus. His place on the grid was left vacant.

== Race ==
=== Race report ===
==== Start and opening laps ====
The race started at 17:00 local time on Sunday, 12 December with an attendance of 153,000. Hamilton immediately took the lead from Verstappen on the main straight. Verstappen attempted an overtake at the turn 6-7 chicane on the inside. Verstappen's trajectory and late braking took him to the far outside of the track, Hamilton, still on the right, cut turn 7, claiming that Verstappen forced him off. Hamilton re-joined considerably further ahead of Verstappen than where he was before the corner. Red Bull Racing protested, arguing that he should have ceded the position to Verstappen, but were told by radio that Hamilton had ultimately given back any advantage gained. The incident was referred to the stewards, who decided that no further investigation was necessary, something Horner called "a total lack of consistency" mid-race. Hamilton then utilised the durability of his medium-compound tyres to extend his lead over Verstappen, whose soft-compound tyres were suffering from greater degradation.

==== Pit stops and virtual safety car ====
Verstappen made his stop at the end of lap 13 with Hamilton following suit one lap later, both opting for a set of the hardest tyres. This elevated Pérez to P1, with the Mexican driver being instructed on radio to hold Hamilton up to allow for Verstappen to catch up. This reduced the gap between the contenders from about 11 seconds after the pits to 1.3 seconds on lap 21. Hamilton proceeded to extend the gap again to four seconds by the midpoint of the race.

On lap 26, Alfa Romeo's Räikkönen collided with the barriers at turn 6 due to brake issues, prompting his retirement in his 349th and final Formula One race. On the same lap, Russell retired in his final race for Williams due to gearbox issues. On lap 35, Giovinazzi retired his car alongside the track for the same reason as Russell, triggering a brief virtual safety car period. Red Bull used this opportunity to pit Verstappen in for a fresh set of the hard-compound tyres without losing track position; Mercedes, wary to give up track position, did not pit Hamilton. Though Verstappen gradually reduced the post-stop deficit from seventeen seconds to eleven, he was not on track to catch Hamilton before the end of the race.

==== Final laps ====
On lap 53, Nicholas Latifi, who was fighting with Haas' Mick Schumacher for 15th place and had dirty tyres after going off circuit at turn 9, crashed at turn 14 and the safety car was deployed. Hamilton again did not pit because he did not have a sufficient gap to Verstappen, with the team possibly expecting the race to end under the safety car. Meanwhile, Verstappen pitted for soft tyres, retaining second position. Pérez retired to the pits to prevent a possible retirement on track. As the debris from Latifi's crash was being cleared by the race marshals, the lapped drivers were initially informed that they would not be permitted to overtake. On lap 57, the penultimate lap, Horner complained over radio to Masi to get "these lapped cars out of the way". (Note: At the end of a safety car period it was at the race director's discretion to have lapped cars, (cars that were at least one full lap behind the leader), to overtake under the safety car and catch the back of the pack on their own, thereby unlapping themselves.) Masi then directed the five lapped cars (Note: Those of Lando Norris, Fernando Alonso, Esteban Ocon, Charles Leclerc, and Sebastian Vettel) between Hamilton and Verstappen specifically to overtake the safety car, unlike the lapped cars behind Verstappen, which stayed in position. This had never happened before, as previously either none or all lapped cars followed this procedure.

There did not appear to be enough time left to restart the race, as regulations stipulated the safety car to return to the pits at the end of the following lap. (Note: I.e. after cars have been unlapping themselves) Immediately after Vettel joined the lead lap by passing Hamilton and the safety car, however, race control announced the safety car would enter the pits at the end of the current lap, allowing for one more lap of green flag conditions. This caused angry remonstrations from Mercedes team principal Toto Wolff: "Michael, this isn’t right!" Verstappen overtook Hamilton into turn 5 to win both the race and the 2021 World Drivers' Championship, with Hamilton in second. Over the radio, Wolff appealed to Masi to reinstate the order of the penultimate lap, to which Masi replied: "Toto, it's called a motor race, ok? We went car racing."

Ferrari driver Carlos Sainz Jr. finished in third, AlphaTauri driver Yuki Tsunoda in a career-best fourth place.

=== Race classification ===
Pos.	No.	Driver	Constructor	Laps	Time/Retired	Grid	Points
1	33	(Netherlands) Max Verstappen	Red Bull Racing-Honda	58	1:30:17.345	1	26^{1}
2	44	(United Kingdom) Lewis Hamilton	Mercedes	58	+2.256	2	18
3	55	(Spain) Carlos Sainz Jr.	Ferrari	58	+5.173	5	15
4	22	(Japan) Yuki Tsunoda	AlphaTauri-Honda	58	+5.692	8	12
5	10	(France) Pierre Gasly	AlphaTauri-Honda	58	+6.531	12	10
6	77	(Finland) Valtteri Bottas	Mercedes	58	+7.463	6	8
7	4	(United Kingdom) Lando Norris	McLaren-Mercedes	58	+59.200	3	6
8	14	(Spain) Fernando Alonso	Alpine-Renault	58	+1:01.708	11	4
9	31	(France) Esteban Ocon	Alpine-Renault	58	+1:04.026	9	2
10	16	(Monaco) Charles Leclerc	Ferrari	58	+1:06.057	7	1
11	5	(Germany) Sebastian Vettel	Aston Martin-Mercedes	58	+1:07.527	15	
12	3	(Australia) Daniel Ricciardo	McLaren-Mercedes	57	+1 lap	10	
13	18	(Canada) Lance Stroll	Aston Martin-Mercedes	57	+1 lap	13	
14	47	(Germany) Mick Schumacher	Haas-Ferrari	57	+1 lap	19	
15^{2}	11	(Mexico) Sergio Pérez	Red Bull Racing-Honda	55	Oil pressure	4	
Ret	6	(Canada) Nicholas Latifi	Williams-Mercedes	50	Accident	16	
Ret	99	(Italy) Antonio Giovinazzi	Alfa Romeo Racing-Ferrari	33	Hydraulics	14	
Ret	63	(United Kingdom) George Russell	Williams-Mercedes	26	Gearbox	17	
Ret	7	(Finland) Kimi Räikkönen	Alfa Romeo Racing-Ferrari	25	Brakes	18	
WD	9	(Russian Automobile Federation) Nikita Mazepin	Haas-Ferrari	0	Positive COVID-19 test	-	
Fastest lap: (Netherlands) Max Verstappen (Red Bull Racing-Honda) – 1:26.103 (lap 39)

Notes

- ^1 – Includes one point for fastest lap.
- ^2 – Sergio Pérez was classified as he completed more than 90% of the race distance.
- ^3 – Nikita Mazepin withdrew before the race as he tested positive for coronavirus. His place on the grid was left vacant.

== Controversies surrounding safety car period ==
In the laps before the safety car, Hamilton was leading comfortably and looked all but set to win the race and the championship. The chaotic final laps produced multiple controversial incidents and decisions. The debates mainly revolved around race director Michael Masi's decisions to allow only the cars between the two title contenders to unlap themselves, and to prematurely end the safety car period, both of which were seen by some as inconsistent with usual race procedures and sparked debate over his motive.

=== Mercedes' protest ===
Mercedes immediately protested the race result, alleging that Masi violated safety car procedure by (1) allowing the cars directly in front of Verstappen to unlap themselves, and no others, and (2) ending the safety car period on the same lap instead of the following lap after having cars unlap themselves. The team additionally argued that Verstappen had overtaken Hamilton during the safety car. While the last point was dismissed on the grounds that Verstappen was not ahead at the end of the safety car period, the other issues were more contentious.

Article 48.12 of the 2021 FIA Formula One Sporting Regulations stipulated that if a message for lapped cars to overtake is issued, any lapped cars are required to pass cars on the lead lap and the safety car, and that the safety car would return to the pit lane at the end of the lap following the one on which the last lapped car passed the race leader. Mercedes argued that Hamilton would have won the race if there had been full compliance with this article, and requested a corresponding amendment to the race classification.

Red Bull, in turn, argued that (a) "any cars" in the regulations did not mean "all cars", (b) Article 48.13 stated that the safety car is withdrawn the same lap as a 'Safety Car In This Lap' message is issued, overriding Article 48.12, (c) the race director assumes overriding authority over the use of the safety car according to Article 15.3, and (d) the race result would not have changed if all eight lapped cars had been permitted to unlap. Masi argued that Article 48.12 was intended to remove cars that "interfered" with drivers racing on the lead lap and that all teams had earlier, in principle, agreed that all races should end under racing conditions.

The stewards dismissed the protest on the grounds that, according to Articles 48.13 and 15.3, the race director has the "overriding authority" to amend any rule regarding safety car procedure as deemed necessary, and to declare Hamilton the winner for leading at lap 57 would effectively shorten the race and therefore be inappropriate. Verstappen was confirmed as world champion, pending any appeal.

Article 15.13

The clerk of the course shall work in permanent consultation with the Race Director. The Race Director shall have overriding authority in the following matters (...): (...) e) The use of the safety car.

Article 48.12

If the clerk of the course considers it safe to do so, and the message "LAPPED CARS MAY NOW OVERTAKE" has been sent to all Competitors (...), any cars that have been lapped by the leader will be required to pass the cars on the lead lap and the safety car. (...) once the last lapped car has passed the leader the safety car will return to the pits at the end of the following lap. (...)

Article 48.13

When the clerk of the course decides it is safe to call in the safety car the message "SAFETY CAR IN THIS LAP" will be sent to all Competitors (...). This will be the signal to the Competitors and drivers that it will be entering the pit lane at the end of that lap. (...) the yellow flags will be withdrawn and a green flag and/or green light panel will be displayed at the Line. — 2021 Formula One Sporting Regulations (Note: See clerk of the course#Auto racing)

Mercedes initially announced their intention to appeal to the FIA International Court of Appeal citing potential breaches of Article 15 of the International Sporting Code and Article 10 of the FIA Judicial and Disciplinary Code. On 15 December, the FIA announced that it would conduct a "detailed analysis and clarification exercise" of the event, investigating the running of the race to determine if adjustments to the safety car procedures were needed. They further stated that there was a "significant misunderstanding" about the rules by some of the teams, drivers and fans, an allegation for which they were criticised by journalist Scott Mitchell. The FIA admitted that the ongoing controversy was "tarnishing the image" of the sport. One day later, Mercedes announced that they would not to pursue an appeal, hours before a submission deadline, vowing to hold the FIA "accountable" nonetheless. Wolff explained that neither he nor Hamilton wished to be awarded the championship in court, and Mercedes would instead focus their efforts to ensure an equitable result from the investigation. Wolff remained heavily critical of Masi. In particular, Wolff criticised Masi's race control in Abu Dhabi as being inconsistent with his handling of the 2020 Eifel Grand Prix, where Masi had claimed the Sporting Regulations mandated that all lapped cars must unlap themselves, and expressed his indignation at the perceived injustice. Both Wolff and Hamilton boycotted the FIA Prize Giving Ceremony. Hamilton was later fined for not attending; he asked the FIA to donate the money towards the work the body carries out with underprivileged children. Amid speculation that Hamilton might announce a snap retirement due to disillusionment with the events, Wolff indicated both he and his driver would continue in the sport after a period of reflection in the off-season.

An expert on international arbitration and litigation suggested in The Guardian that Mercedes would have been in a strong position to mount legal action. They described the dismissal of Mercedes' initial challenge to the results as the FIA "marking its own homework" and further noted the conflict between a desire to stress sporting integrity and the increased commercialisation of the sport. While expressing sympathy to the notion of accepting the outcome of a race on the track, he suspected that Mercedes would "not have any choice" but to appeal. Another lawyer, Nicholas Bamber, concurred in saying there was a "good legal basis" for an appeal, and that he believes an apparent inconsistency in the implementation of regulations could prove difficult to justify.

In January 2022, the BBC reported that Mercedes had reached a quid pro quo agreement with the FIA, in which Masi and Formula One's technical director Nikolas Tombazis would not be in the same position for the 2022 season, in exchange for dropping their appeal. Wolff would also have a personal meeting with FIA president Mohammed Ben Sulayem to discuss the way forward. Drivers were expected to cite what they perceived to be a lenient attitude by Masi and race stewards towards Verstappen's driving during the 2021 season, with Andrew Benson of BBC Sport saying this could result in a harder line on driving standards in the future.

=== Reactions and commentary ===
In the immediate post-race interview, Hamilton congratulated Verstappen and his family on his first World Drivers' Championship, as did his father Anthony. Wolff congratulated Verstappen via text message.

Several drivers expressed discontent over what had transpired. In a last-lap radio message to his race engineer Peter Bonnington, which was not played on the television feed, Hamilton said the race had been "manipulated". Russell, who was signed to be Hamilton's teammate at Mercedes in 2022, called the decisions of Michael Masi "unacceptable". Norris, one of the five drivers permitted to unlap themselves, said the decision to go racing again on the last lap was made "for TV". The four other drivers, Alonso, Ocon, Leclerc, and Vettel, also expressed confusion at the sudden instruction to unlap. Daniel Ricciardo, the first driver not permitted to unlap himself, said he was "speechless" at the instruction, which prevented him to race other drivers on newer soft-compound tyres. Sainz Jr., who was positioned behind Ricciardo and Lance Stroll upon the restart, immediately under pressure from Tsunoda, Pierre Gasly, and Bottas behind, opined that the decision to resume racing under the circumstances "nearly cost [him his] podium". Speaking at Aston Martin's 2022 car launch in February 2022, Stroll described the Abu Dhabi situation as "ridiculous", articulating that rules should be set in stone before a season starts.

Masi's decisions were widely criticised as unusual and to contrive excitement. 1996 world champion Damon Hill commented that the decision appeared without precedent, stating that it was "a new way of running the sport, where the race director can make these ad hoc decisions". 2016 world champion Nico Rosberg felt that Masi "did not follow the rules" and Horner demanding "one more lap of racing" to Masi via radio was inappropriate. Writing for Fox Sports, Jack Austin stated that Formula One "engineered" the finish out of a "desperation for drama". Jordan Bianchi of The Athletic echoed a similar sentiment, suggesting that Masi's decision was to ensure that "Netflix gets another juicy storyline for the next season of Drive to Survive", and also questioned his capability in effectively officiating a race. BBC chief Formula One writer Andrew Benson noted that Masi had "failed to apply the rules correctly in two different ways" and appeared to have changed his mind about the procedures, as he had followed another course of action during the 2020 Eifel Grand Prix when his explanation had been: "There's a requirement in the sporting regulations to wave all the lapped cars past." In a documentary reviewing the title battle, Mercedes boss Toto Wolff compared the final lap to the abolished golden goal rule formerly used in association football. Former racing driver Susie Wolff was in "disbelief" over Masi having "[interpreted] the rules in a way that had never been applied before".

In particular, the fairness of Masi's decision to diverge from standard safety car procedures was extensively debated. Swedish former racing driver, Stefan Johansson, commented: "Whether it's intentional or not, the entertainment value of this controversy has gone through the roof. But I think there has to be a balance somewhere because the decisions Masi made (...) completely ignored any level of common sense as to what would have been a fair way to handle the situation". India's first Formula One driver, Narain Karthikeyan claimed: "It was a great battle for the championship but what happened yesterday, it wasn't sport. You need close battles in Formula One but it has to be fair at the same time (...) What happened was not fair". German former rally champion Walter Röhrl called for races to be decided on the track or in a "fair, clear process that is not influenced by any opaque external decisions". Dutch former Formula One driver Christijan Albers also raised the issue of fairness: "Michael Masi seemed a bit unsure at a few races last year. He made some ambiguous decisions. But he certainly played a decisive role in the final leg of the season, which left many in bewilderment. Everyone wanted the season finale to be fair". Writing in The Times, while Matt Dickinson vouched for the officiating process to be thoroughly reviewed, he rejected resentment over the decisions possibly having been made for entertainment on the grounds that "rules in sport are contrived – and frequently tweaked to make a sport more entertaining – and we should not pretend that there is only one perspective of justice, or that sport is an endless pursuit of fairness." Journalist Chris Medland noted the irony in Masi's supposed unsporting decision making given he himself had warned all drivers against unsporting behaviour in the lead up to the event. Labour peer and vice-chairman of the All Party Parliamentary Group on Formula One, Peter Hain, commented that the events at the finale were not good for the sport. He said: "It may be exciting and it may be dramatic, it may gain the audiences that Formula One craves, but you have to think of the credibility and the integrity of the sport in the longer term (...) the FIA can't afford to have Formula One tarnished in this way".

Several analysts highlighted that Masi's decision had direct bearings on the championship results. Andrew Benson, again writing for the BBC, opined in March 2022 that if Masi had allowed all lapped cars to unlap themselves, the race would not have restarted at all, and Hamilton would have won both the race and the championship. Sky Sports F1 commentator David Croft assessed that Hamilton would have won the race and the championship had "the rules been adhered to as they are written". Former driver Karun Chandhok, however, stated that Verstappen could have won the championship even if the normal procedure had been followed "had the lapped cars gone past before the end of lap 56".

Others drew attention to the amount of psychological pressure Masi would have been under. Dutch newspaper De Volkskrant made note of the immense pressure on a Formula One race director to make snap decisions, and expressed sympathy with Masi on that basis. Nico Rosberg also sympathised with Masi: "He's got the whole world watching and he has to decide in the next 15 seconds what he's doing." Ferrari team principal Mattia Binotto defended Masi, saying that "his job was the most difficult job on the planet at that time." Four-time world champion Vettel commented: "Everyone has an opinion, I think leave the stewards alone, it's tough enough as it is. Ideally we'd like more consistency but there's also a human side, so it's probably difficult to get it 100 percent right, but it has to be our target, so we need to see what we can improve." McLaren team principal Andreas Seidl said that Masi's role needs to be understood in the context of an intense title battle. Former driver Romain Grosjean defended Masi's decision and commented: "There's a few ways of seeing it. It would have been very strange to not unlap those cars and have Lewis first and then Max four cars behind over one lap for the world championship. And, on the other hand, for Lewis it was definitely not a great call. But as a TV fan, as a spectator, as for the sport, I think Michael Masi made the right decision." Less forgivingly, Karthikeyan questioned Masi's ability to handle pressure.

Horner defended Masi's decision making, claiming that Mercedes lost the race due to tactical errors instead. Karthikeyan argued Mercedes had made the right strategic decisions. Mercedes has particularly been subject to criticism for not pitting Hamilton during the safety car, leaving him vulnerable on the final lap with old tyres. According to former team manager Peter Windsor, Mercedes assumed the race would end under safety car conditions, which did not happen only because "the FIA did not follow its own rules", something that was impossible for Mercedes to predict. Wolff later professed that while he himself had always tried to look at things from the other side, Horner was "never able to admit" that Masi had been in the wrong that day.

Dutch newspaper NRC Handelsblad noted the role luck had played throughout the whole season, and that it was not Verstappen's fault that his win had "become tainted with controversy". It was also lamented how a "most beautiful" season had deserved a better ending. Verstappen later stated that he does not care about people thinking his title is tarnished. Wolff, however critical of the means, described Verstappen as a "worthy champion".

=== Regulation changes and removal of Masi as race director ===
On 17 December 2021, bin Sulayem hinted at changes to avoid such controversy in the future, and did not rule out the possibility of removing Masi from his role as race director. On 13 January 2022, it was reported that the FIA was considering making changes to the safety car procedures as well as its own internal operational structure within Formula One after the FIA launched a consultation with all ten Formula One teams on "various issues". In line with the deal that had Mercedes drop their appeal, the FIA published new guidelines ahead of the 2022 season which included stricter rules on wheel-to-wheel combat as well as stricter enforcement of track limits through revised phrasings.

Former Formula One driver-turned commentator Martin Brundle commented that "removing Masi won't solve F1's credibility concerns" caused by the incident, but three-time Grand Prix winner Johnny Herbert felt Masi had done "too much damage" to the sport's reputation and should be replaced. On 28 January 2022, the BBC reported that Masi would be replaced as part of a restructure to the officiating system, with race officials expected to be given more flexibility through rule tweaks over matters such as the deployment of the safety car, and that teams will likely be prohibited from talking to the race director on stewards decisions. Motorspors news website The Race and Sky Sports also ran similar stories on Masi being replaced. The Race's article further stated that some of the responsibilities of the race director could be reassigned to different personnel. FIA secretary General Peter Bayer stated that the race director had "too much" to cope with. Bayer also stated that Masi could stay with the organisation in another capacity. Following its investigation and a meeting of the F1 Commission on 14 February 2022 the FIA said it would reveal an 'action plan' for structural changes within its organisation later that same week.

On 17 February 2022, race control was restructured, with Masi removed from the position of race director and with Eduardo Freitas and Niels Wittich alternating in the role with former deputy race director Herbie Blash as a permanent advisor and a new virtual race control with the parameters of acceptable communication between teams and race director being restricted to reduce lobbying. Radio transmissions between teams and the FIA will no longer be broadcast on television to ease pressure on race officials. The FIA subsequently revealed regulation changes regarding safety car procedures to be used from the 2022 season onwards. Under these changes rather than waiting until the lap after the last car has unlapped itself from the leader, the safety car will now be withdrawn one lap after the instruction that lapped cars may unlap themselves has been given. In remarks published on 11 April 2022, Toto Wolff referred to Masi as having been a "liability" to the sport and hinted that he did not take well to receiving feedback or criticism from anybody as well as suggesting that Masi had on occasion acted borderline disrespectful towards drivers in driver briefings.

=== FIA inquiry and report ===
The FIA review began in January 2022. On 9 February 2022, in the course of the inquiry radio messages between Masi and Red Bull team manager Jonathan Wheatley emerged, the exchange suggesting that Masi had taken instructions from Wheatley, with the Red Bull manager appearing to author the notion of Masi not needing to let all lapped cars unlap themselves as well as withdrawing the safety car quickly, something later described as a "bromance" by Wolff. In March 2022, the FIA published their official report. It included the following points:

30. The safety car unlapping procedure (...) stemming from the misunderstanding regarding the application of this procedure at the 2021 Abu Dhabi GP, pursuant to Articles 48.12 and 48.13 of the F1 Sporting Regulations.

31. It was apparent from the analysis that there could be different interpretations of Article 48.12 and/or Article 48.13, and that this likely contributed to some of the confusion surrounding the safety car unlapping procedure. It was therefore considered that these provisions of the F1 Sporting Regulations would benefit from clarification.

32. It was also considered that the decisions regarding the safety car at the end of the 2021 Abu Dhabi GP likely took into account previous discussions (...) that made clear the F1 teams’ preference to end races under green flag racing conditions, rather than behind a safety car (...)

33. The process of identifying the lapped cars used to be a manual process. For 2022 season a software has been developed that will automate the communication of the list of cars that must unlap themselves.

34. (...) a rule change (...) clarifies that in case of unlapping “all” cars rather than “any” cars have to unlap. (...)

35. The results of the 2021 Abu Dhabi Grand Prix and the FIA Formula One World Championship are valid, final and cannot now be changed. (...) — FIA Executive Summary Report

The FIA report also concluded that the communication between the team principals of Mercedes and Red Bull with Masi during the final laps was inappropriate, and recommended changes be made "in order to protect the Race Director from any pressure and allow him to take decisions peacefully". Further recommendations were made to clarify the safety car regulations. The report significantly contributed to reforms by FIA President Mohammed Ben Sulayem aimed at restructuring and modernising race operations.

After the final report was presented to the World Motor Sport Council, the FIA issued a press statement stating (inter alia) that race director Michael Masi had acted "in good faith and to the best of his knowledge given the difficult circumstances".

== Final Championship standings ==
Verstappen finished the season eight points ahead of Hamilton as the first Red Bull driver since 2013 to win the championship. He was also the first in a Honda-powered car to do so since Senna in 1991. Mercedes won their eighth consecutive Constructors' title, extending their own record. It was the first time since 2008, when Hamilton had won for McLaren, that the Driver's champion had not been driving for the Constructors' champions.

**Drivers' Championship standings**

	Pos.	Driver	Points
Unchanged	1	(Netherlands) **Max Verstappen**	395.5
Unchanged	2	(United Kingdom) Lewis Hamilton	387.5
Unchanged	3	(Finland) Valtteri Bottas	226
Unchanged	4	(Mexico) Sergio Pérez	190
2	5	(Spain) Carlos Sainz Jr.	164.5

**Constructors' Championship standings**

	Pos.	Constructor	Points
Unchanged	1	(Germany) **Mercedes**	613.5
Unchanged	2	(Austria) Red Bull Racing-Honda	585.5
Unchanged	3	(Italy) Ferrari	323.5
Unchanged	4	(United Kingdom) McLaren-Mercedes	275
Unchanged	5	(France) Alpine-Renault	155

- Note: Only the top five positions are included for both sets of standings.
- Bold text indicates the 2021 World Champions

== Legacy ==
Immediately after the race, Nicholas Latifi apologised for causing the crash that led to the controversial safety car period. Over the ensuing days, Latifi stated that he received abuse and death threats from people on social media and condemned the online abuse. A few months later, Latifi revealed that he had received messages of support from Lewis Hamilton and that he had to be accompanied by additional personal security when attending events ahead of the 2022 season. He also confirmed personal plans to highlight the effect on mental health that online abuse can have on people.

On 11 January 2022, the BBC reported that Hamilton was considering his future in the sport pending the outcome of the FIA report, with the Formula One paddock expecting the FIA to take significant action as a result of the race. According to Benson, Mercedes denied claims that they dropped their post race appeal after being assured that Masi would step down or be removed from his role. On the same day, Formula One journalist Mark Hughes noted that Hamilton's silence since the race had echoes of Ayrton Senna's past feud with the governing body after the championship deciders in 1989 and 1990. Mitchell commented that the Abu Dhabi situation was just one part of a wider dissatisfaction from teams with how the FIA had begun to apply regulations in the seasons following Masi's appointment in 2019. Meanwhile, on the subject of Hamilton potentially announcing a snap retirement, 1978 world champion Mario Andretti believed the desire to try and win an eighth title would prove too hard to resist regardless of the outcome of the inquiry, and that Hamilton would be doing a "disservice" to himself if he did not race for another season. McLaren CEO Zak Brown said the sport should not just automatically assume that Hamilton was going to stay on in the sport for 2022, though Brown personally expected him to contest it. Brown also cited the Abu Dhabi controversy along with the last minute cancellation of the 2020 Australian Grand Prix and the handling of the rain affected 2021 Belgian Grand Prix as symptoms of the FIA suffering from organisational problems for a significant period of time, which needed to be resolved urgently. The 1997 world champion Jacques Villeneuve speculated that Hamilton was staying silent because he was trying to distance himself from Mercedes boss Toto Wolff, perhaps considering a career in the film industry. Hamilton subsequently broke his silence, and continued to race in the 2022 season. He went 30 months without a win, doubting himself, and taking a toll on his mental health.

Michael Masi has also been subject to social media abuse and death threats as a result of the controversies due to which he sought support for his mental health. During the 2023 Australian Grand Prix, Masi wished to meet Hamilton in an effort to explain his momentous decisions. Hamilton declined, as there was "nothing to say".

In 2024, Red Bull CTO Adrian Newey reflected on how Abu Dhabi left a psychological effect on Mercedes and they were unable to move on.

Susie Wolff, Toto Wolff's wife, has revealed that the impact of Abu Dhabi "weighed heavily on [her] for a long time". Toto Wolff has stated he has "never spoken with Masi since the race" and 'did not wish to ever speak to him again'. He has described the sudden, contradictory turns of events in the final few minutes of the race as a "nightmare", revealed how they became a taboo in the family for a time, and predicted that Lewis and him would "never overcome the pain and the distress". He believes the infamous events of December 2021 will leave a legacy on Formula One, and the 2021 Abu Dhabi Grand Prix "will never be forgotten". By denying Hamilton an eighth title, so Wolff suggests, Masi had 'destroyed the record of the greatest champion of all time', describing Masi as a "lunatic". In an interview with The Telegraph almost exactly four years after the ominius event, Wolff revealed that both he and Hamilton still think about Abu Dhabi "every day".

== Notes ==
Previous race: 2021 Saudi Arabian Grand Prix	FIA Formula One World Championship; 2021 season	Next race: 2022 Bahrain Grand Prix
Previous race: 2020 Abu Dhabi Grand Prix	Abu Dhabi Grand Prix	Next race: 2022 Abu Dhabi Grand Prix
