= Niels Wittich =

German motorsport official (born 1972)

- Born: 1971 or 1972 (age 53–54); Germany
- Occupation: Formula One race director
- Years active: 2022–2024
- Predecessor: Michael Masi
- Successor: Rui Marques

Niels Wittich (born 1971 or 1972) is a German motorsport official who served as the race director of Formula One from 2022 until his departure in 2024.

== Career ==
Wittich has a background in motorsport where he has worked in the ADAC GT Masters and the Deutsche Tourenwagen Masters, where he served as, among other roles, race director. He left DTM following the 2021 season, being replaced by Scot Elkins.

In 2021, Wittich worked in race control for Formula 2 and Formula 3, while also assisting with Formula One. Wittich was set to become the deputy race director for Formula One in 2022 under the lead of Michael Masi. However, Masi was removed from his role before the 2022 season began following an investigation into the 2021 Abu Dhabi Grand Prix. As a result, Wittich and Eduardo Freitas were both selected to jointly serve as race director for 2022. Prior to the 2022 United States Grand Prix, the FIA decided to abandon the rotating race director concept, and Wittich became the sole race director for the rest of the season. He served continued to serve in this role for the 2023 season and for a majority of the 2024 season. Wittich departed from the position prior to the 2024 Las Vegas Grand Prix, being replaced by Rui Marques.

In 2026, Wittich took on a role at Geobrugg Motorsport, a Swiss company that produces barriers, catch fences, and safety consulting for various Formula One Grands Prix and other series.
