= Rui Marques (Formula One) =

Portuguese motorsport official

- Born: 1972 or 1973 (age 52–53); Portugal
- Occupation: Formula One Race Director
- Years active: 2024–present
- Predecessor: Niels Wittich

Rui Marques (born 1972 or 1973) is a Portuguese motorsport official who currently serves as the Formula One race director. He was promoted to the position in November 2024.

== Career ==
=== Early career ===
Marques began his career at the Fédération Internationale de l'Automobile in 2012. He previously worked in karting in his home country of Portugal, and also as the race director for the World Touring Car Championship. He has also served as a track marshal, scrutineer, and steward.

From 2022 to 2024, Marques served as the race director for Formula 2 and Formula 3. He also directed the 2024 Macau Grand Prix, which featured a large number of red flags and safety cars across the weekend.

=== Formula One ===
Marques was promoted to the position of Formula One race director prior to the 2024 Las Vegas Grand Prix, after his predecessor Niels Wittich departed from the role. During the Las Vegas weekend, Marques was complimented by GPDA Director and Mercedes driver George Russell and Ferrari driver Carlos Sainz Jr. for his swift response to criticism regarding track markings.

Marques was set to be replaced by Janette Tan as the Formula 2 race director, but she was unexpectedly removed from her position shortly before the 2024 Qatar Grand Prix. As a result, Marques was forced to serve as both the Formula One and Formula 2 race director for the Qatar and Abu Dhabi rounds. He continued in his role for the 2025 Formula One season alongside Claire Dubbelman, who served as his permanent deputy. Remaining in the position for 2026, Paul Burns replaced Dubbelman as his deputy.
