= 2019 Australian Grand Prix =

2019 Formula 1 race

Race 1 of 21 in the 2019 Formula One World Championship
Next race →
- Layout of the Melbourne Grand Prix Circuit

Race details
- Date: 17 March 2019
- Official name: Formula 1 Rolex Australian Grand Prix 2019
- Location: Albert Park Circuit; Melbourne, Australia
- Course: Temporary street circuit
- Course length: 5.303 km (3.295 miles)
- Distance: 58 laps, 307.574 km (191.118 miles)
- Weather: Sunny
- Attendance: 324,100

Pole position
Driver	(United Kingdom) Lewis Hamilton	Mercedes
- Time: 1:20.486

Fastest lap
Driver	(Finland) Valtteri Bottas	Mercedes
- Time: 1:25.580 on lap 57

Podium
First	(Finland) Valtteri Bottas	Mercedes
Second	(United Kingdom) Lewis Hamilton	Mercedes
Third	(Netherlands) Max Verstappen	Red Bull Racing-Honda

The 2019 Australian Grand Prix (formally known as the Formula 1 Rolex Australian Grand Prix 2019) was a Formula One motor race that was held on 17 March 2019 in Melbourne, Victoria. The race was contested at the Albert Park Circuit and was the first round of the 2019 FIA Formula One World Championship. The race marked the 84th race in the combined history of the Australian Grand Prix – which dates back to the 100 Miles Road Race of 1928 – the 24th time the event was held at the Albert Park circuit and the 35th time the Australian Grand Prix had been a part of the Formula One World Championship. This was the last Grand Prix held on this configuration of the Albert Park Circuit that had been in use since 1996 with the 2020 and 2021 events being cancelled and the 2022 event being run on an adjusted layout.

Lewis Hamilton entered the round as the defending World Drivers' Champion and his team, Mercedes, were the defending World Constructors' Champions. Hamilton got pole position for the race, equalling the record for most poles at one Grand Prix (8), but it was his Mercedes teammate Valtteri Bottas who won the Grand Prix from second on the grid, while Hamilton followed behind him in second and Max Verstappen taking third. It was also the Formula One debuts of future World Champion Lando Norris and future race winner George Russell, who drove for McLaren and Williams respectively. In addition 2008 Canadian Grand Prix winner Robert Kubica made his first F1 race start since the 2010 Abu Dhabi Grand Prix at this race for Williams and his first start since his 2011 rallying accident which left him with a partially severed right hand.

This was the last time that the Australian Grand Prix was held as the season opener until 2025.

== Background ==
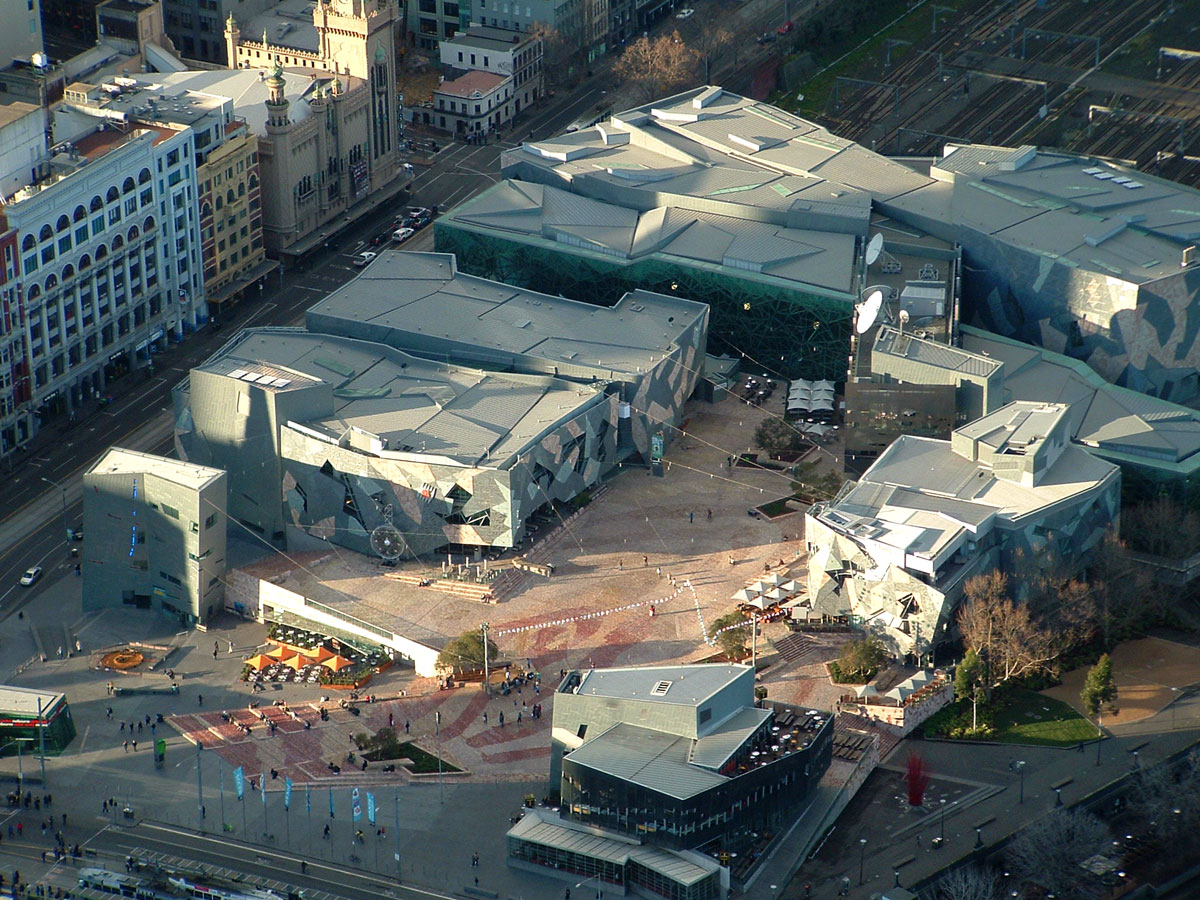
Federation Square hosted the first Formula One season launch.

The Australian Grand Prix was officially confirmed as the first of twenty-one races of the 2019 Formula One World Championship at an FIA World Motor Sport Council meeting in Paris in December 2018. The race took place at the sixteen-turn, 5.303 km (3.295 mi) Albert Park Circuit in Melbourne, Victoria on 17 March 2019. Melbourne's Federation Square hosted a season launch event, the first of its kind for the sport, in the week before the race.

Race Director Charlie Whiting died suddenly in the week before the race, so Deputy Race Director Michael Masi was named as Whiting's temporary successor. Local officials were appointed to fill Whiting's additional roles until a long-term appointment could be made ahead of the Bahrain Grand Prix. Masi remained the Race Director until the conclusion of the 2021 season.

=== Entrants ===
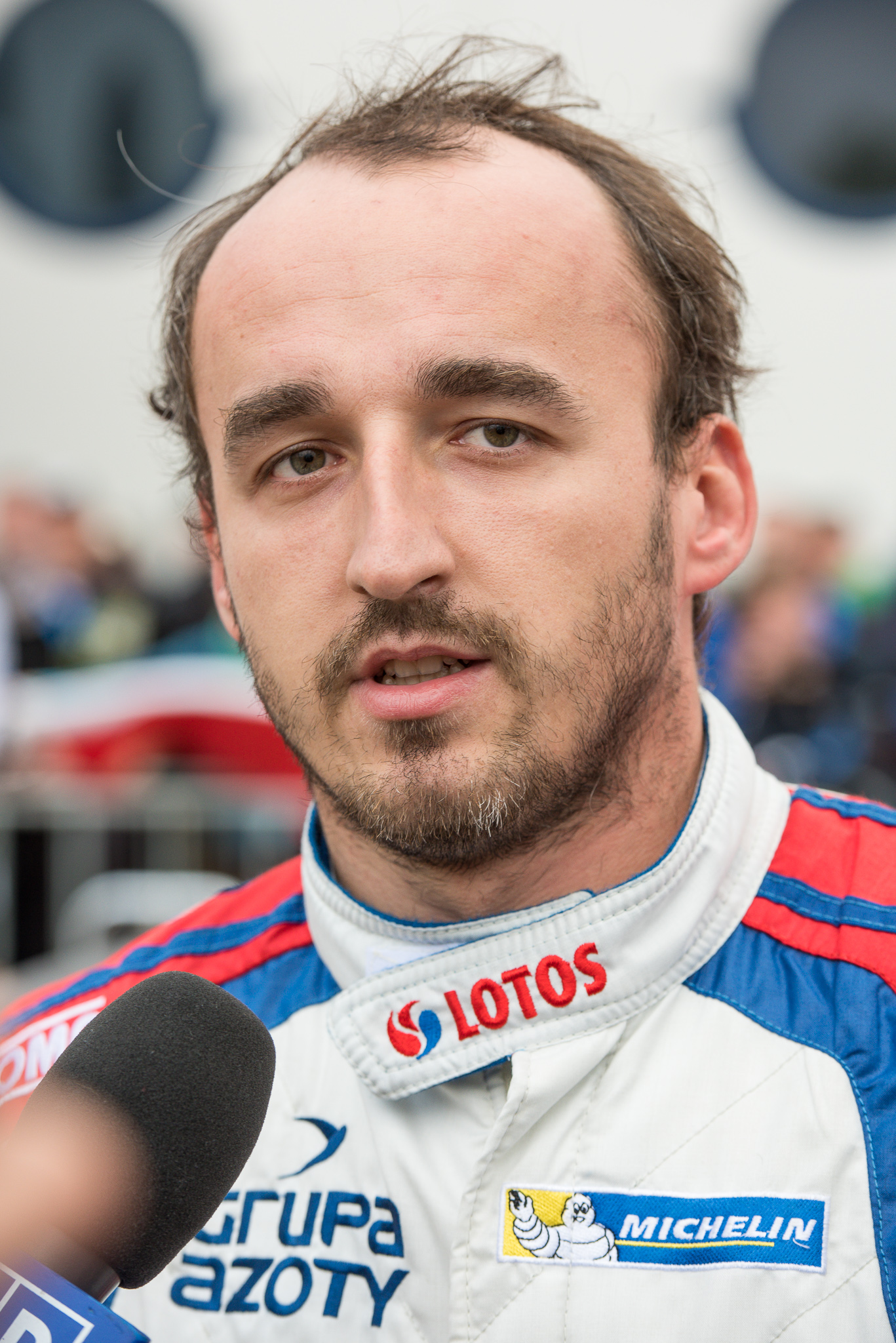
Robert Kubica returned to Formula One after suffering life-threatening injuries in a 2011 rallying accident.

Twenty drivers representing ten teams entered the race. Alfa Romeo Racing made their return to the sport, replacing the Sauber F1 Team as part of a sponsorship deal that started in 2018. Racing Point also made their début as an independent constructor, having acquired the assets of the Sahara Force India team and having competed under the Force India name in 2018. Alexander Albon, Lando Norris and George Russell all made their competitive débuts. Meanwhile, Antonio Giovinazzi, Robert Kubica and Daniil Kvyat all returned to the championship. Kubica was making his first race start since the 2010 Abu Dhabi Grand Prix, the Pole having been out of the F1 since rally accident in 2011 which partially severed his right hand.

Mission Winnow, the title sponsor of Ferrari, was banned from the race as it did not comply with local laws governing tobacco sponsorship.

=== Tyres ===
Tyre supplier Pirelli provided teams with an intermediate range of tyres for the race. Under rules introduced in 2019, Pirelli changed the designations of their tyres to rate the hardness of the compounds, with "C1" being the hardest and "C5" the softest. The colour-coding system used in previous years was simplified so that the white-coloured tyre wall represents the hardest compound available at any Grand Prix, a yellow tyre wall the medium compound and the red tyre wall the softest tyre. Pirelli nominated the C2 tyre as the white-banded hard compound, C3 as the yellow-banded medium and C4 as the red-banded soft.

=== Points system change ===
The race saw the introduction of a change to the points system. The system in use since 2010 was retained, but drivers who set the fastest lap could be awarded a bonus point, provided that they finish the race inside the top ten. The bonus point is also awarded to the constructor of the driver that set the fastest lap.

== Practice ==
Lewis Hamilton was fastest in all three practice sessions. The sessions ran uninterrupted apart from an incident that saw Alexander Albon spinning out at turn 2 and hitting the wall during the first practice session. Albon was able to return to the pits for repairs. In the third practice session, McLaren released Lando Norris into the path of Robert Kubica which resulted in the McLaren team receiving a fine.

== Qualifying ==
The first qualifying session passed without incident until the final couple of minutes when Robert Kubica hit the wall coming out of turn 10, giving him a puncture. He later attributed this to a sudden increase in grip. The drivers knocked out in Q1 and finishing qualifying in sixteenth to twentieth respectively were Lance Stroll, Pierre Gasly, Carlos Sainz, George Russell and Robert Kubica, with Charles Leclerc setting the fastest lap time of the session. Gasly being knocked out came as a particular surprise and put his early exit down to unexpected track evolution. Sainz was also disappointed with his early exit from qualifying, especially considering his teammate qualified in eighth. Sainz attributed his early exit to having to slow down after Kubica got a puncture in front of him, forcing him to slow down on his qualifying lap.

The second qualifying session passed without incident and resulted with Nico Hülkenberg, Daniel Ricciardo, Alexander Albon, Antonio Giovinazzi and Daniil Kvyat being knocked out and finishing qualifying ranked eleventh to fifteenth respectively, with Lewis Hamilton setting a qualifying lap record to end the session fastest. The surprises came from the two Renaults of Ricciardo and Hülkenberg being knocked out after being considered as the fourth fastest team following pre-season testing, and from Lando Norris getting in to the top ten.

For the third qualifying session, all of the teams were able to have two attempts to set the fastest time. After the first attempt it was Valtteri Bottas who was leading, having beaten the qualifying lap record which Hamilton had set in Q2. Bottas was followed by Hamilton and Sebastian Vettel. During the second attempt in Q3, Hamilton improved his time by half a second to beat Bottas's lap record. As no one else improved their time sufficiently to beat any of the top three, it was Lewis Hamilton who took pole position, followed by Valtteri Bottas and Sebastian Vettel completing the top three. The top ten was completed by Max Verstappen, Charles Leclerc, Romain Grosjean, Kevin Magnussen, Lando Norris, Kimi Räikkönen and Sergio Pérez. In his post-qualifying interview Leclerc confessed that he wasn't happy with his performance, saying that he thought he was able to get into the top three but he was unable to do so due to an untidy lap. Meanwhile, Haas said that they were delighted with their performance of getting their cars into the sixth and seventh positions.

=== Qualifying classification ===
Pos.	No.	Driver	Constructor	Qualifying times			Final grid
Pos.	No.	Driver	Constructor	Q1	Q2	Q3	Final grid
1	44	(United Kingdom) Lewis Hamilton	Mercedes	1:22.043	1:21.014	1:20.486	1
2	77	(Finland) Valtteri Bottas	Mercedes	1:22.367	1:21.193	1:20.598	2
3	5	(Germany) Sebastian Vettel	Ferrari	1:22.885	1:21.912	1:21.190	3
4	33	(Netherlands) Max Verstappen	Red Bull Racing-Honda	1:22.876	1:21.678	1:21.320	4
5	16	(Monaco) Charles Leclerc	Ferrari	1:22.017	1:21.739	1:21.442	5
6	8	(France) Romain Grosjean	Haas-Ferrari	1:22.959	1:21.870	1:21.826	6
7	20	(Denmark) Kevin Magnussen	Haas-Ferrari	1:22.519	1:22.221	1:22.099	7
8	4	(United Kingdom) Lando Norris	McLaren-Renault	1:22.702	1:22.423	1:22.304	8
9	7	(Finland) Kimi Räikkönen	Alfa Romeo Racing-Ferrari	1:22.966	1:22.349	1:22.314	9
10	11	(Mexico) Sergio Pérez	Racing Point-BWT Mercedes	1:22.908	1:22.532	1:22.781	10
11	27	(Germany) Nico Hülkenberg	Renault	1:22.540	1:22.562	N/A	11
12	3	(Australia) Daniel Ricciardo	Renault	1:22.921	1:22.570	N/A	12
13	23	(Thailand) Alexander Albon	Scuderia Toro Rosso-Honda	1:22.757	1:22.636	N/A	13
14	99	(Italy) Antonio Giovinazzi	Alfa Romeo Racing-Ferrari	1:22.431	1:22.714	N/A	14
15	26	(Russia) Daniil Kvyat	Scuderia Toro Rosso-Honda	1:22.511	1:22.774	N/A	15
16	18	(Canada) Lance Stroll	Racing Point-BWT Mercedes	1:23.017	N/A	N/A	16
17	10	(France) Pierre Gasly	Red Bull Racing-Honda	1:23.020	N/A	N/A	17
18	55	(Spain) Carlos Sainz Jr.	McLaren-Renault	1:23.084	N/A	N/A	18
19	63	(United Kingdom) George Russell	Williams-Mercedes	1:24.360	N/A	N/A	19
20	88	(Poland) Robert Kubica	Williams-Mercedes	1:26.067	N/A	N/A	20
107% time: 1:27.758

== Race ==
Valtteri Bottas started the race well from second place, and had the lead going into turn one. Further back, Daniel Ricciardo was contesting a position with Sergio Pérez, in which Ricciardo had to drive on the grass on the right side of the track to avoid Pérez. However, Ricciardo drove over a sunken bit of tarmac which caused his front wing to fall apart, spilling debris around that part of the track and causing him to drop to last, as he drove round with no front wing before pitting for a replacement. Max Verstappen was passed by Charles Leclerc who then proceeded to battle his teammate Sebastian Vettel. Vettel kept Leclerc at bay in 5th and Leclerc was overtaken by Verstappen. Robert Kubica also came into the pits on lap 1 after losing his front wing at the start, following contact with Pierre Gasly.

On lap 11, Carlos Sainz pulled over in his McLaren at the entrance to the pits, with a large plume of smoke emerging from the rear of his car, which was followed by an onboard fire. Kimi Räikkönen pitted on lap 13 whilst Pierre Gasly struggled to make progress from P17. Gasly only moved up to P12 despite being in a significantly faster car than those in front of him. Nico Hülkenberg and Pérez then pulled into the pits in search of an undercut, followed by Vettel who put on the medium tyres. Lewis Hamilton pitted a lap later onto the same tyre compound, and he emerged ahead of Vettel. Romain Grosjean then pitted but an issue on the front left tyre caused him to lose three positions during his pit stop. Antonio Giovinazzi went wide on the approach to turn 13, allowing Grosjean to pass through. Bottas, the race leader, made his pit stop on lap 23, with Verstappen following suit three laps later. Leclerc pitted from second place on lap 29. Daniel Ricciardo retired as a precaution following the lap 1 incident. Verstappen passed Vettel on lap 31. Grosjean pulled over on to the runoff area on the penultimate corner, after his front left wheel came loose. Daniil Kvyat went wide trying to pass Lance Stroll at turn 3 on lap 38. Bottas retook the fastest lap and won the Grand Prix by over 20 seconds to his teammate Hamilton. They were followed by Verstappen in third and the two Ferrari cars trailing in fourth and fifth. Bottas became the first driver to win a bonus point for the fastest lap of the race since Maurice Trintignant at the 1959 United States Grand Prix.

=== Race classification ===
Pos.	No.	Driver	Constructor	Laps	Time/Retired	Grid	Points
1	77	(Finland) Valtteri Bottas	Mercedes	58	1:25:27.325	2	26^{1}
2	44	(United Kingdom) Lewis Hamilton	Mercedes	58	+20.886	1	18
3	33	(Netherlands) Max Verstappen	Red Bull Racing-Honda	58	+22.520	4	15
4	5	(Germany) Sebastian Vettel	Ferrari	58	+57.109	3	12
5	16	(Monaco) Charles Leclerc	Ferrari	58	+58.203	5	10
6	20	(Denmark) Kevin Magnussen	Haas-Ferrari	58	+1:27.156	7	8
7	27	(Germany) Nico Hülkenberg	Renault	57	+1 lap	11	6
8	7	(Finland) Kimi Räikkönen	Alfa Romeo Racing-Ferrari	57	+1 lap	9	4
9	18	(Canada) Lance Stroll	Racing Point-BWT Mercedes	57	+1 lap	16	2
10	26	(Russia) Daniil Kvyat	Scuderia Toro Rosso-Honda	57	+1 lap	15	1
11	10	(France) Pierre Gasly	Red Bull Racing-Honda	57	+1 lap	17	
12	4	(United Kingdom) Lando Norris	McLaren-Renault	57	+1 lap	8	
13	11	(Mexico) Sergio Pérez	Racing Point-BWT Mercedes	57	+1 lap	10	
14	23	(Thailand) Alexander Albon	Scuderia Toro Rosso-Honda	57	+1 lap	13	
15	99	(Italy) Antonio Giovinazzi	Alfa Romeo Racing-Ferrari	57	+1 lap	14	
16	63	(United Kingdom) George Russell	Williams-Mercedes	56	+2 laps	19	
17	88	(Poland) Robert Kubica	Williams-Mercedes	55	+3 laps	20	
Ret	8	(France) Romain Grosjean	Haas-Ferrari	29	Wheel	6	
Ret	3	(Australia) Daniel Ricciardo	Renault	28	Accident damage	12	
Ret	55	(Spain) Carlos Sainz Jr.	McLaren-Renault	9	Power unit	18	
Fastest lap: (Finland) Valtteri Bottas (Mercedes) – 1:25.580 (lap 57)

Notes

- ^1 – Includes one point for fastest lap.

== Championship standings after the race ==
Drivers' Championship standings

Pos.	Driver	Points
1	(Finland) Valtteri Bottas	26
2	(United Kingdom) Lewis Hamilton	18
3	(Netherlands) Max Verstappen	15
4	(Germany) Sebastian Vettel	12
5	(Monaco) Charles Leclerc	10

Constructors' Championship standings

Pos.	Constructor	Points
1	(Germany) Mercedes	44
2	(Italy) Ferrari	22
3	(Austria) Red Bull Racing-Honda	15
4	(United States) Haas-Ferrari	8
5	(France) Renault	6

- Note: Only the top five positions are included for both sets of standings.

== See also ==
- 2019 Melbourne 400

Previous race: 2018 Abu Dhabi Grand Prix	FIA Formula One World Championship; 2019 season	Next race: 2019 Bahrain Grand Prix
Previous race: 2018 Australian Grand Prix	Australian Grand Prix	Next race: 2022 Australian Grand Prix; 2020 edition cancelled
