= Charles Faroux =

Motorsport official, race director and french carom world champion, born 1872, died 1957

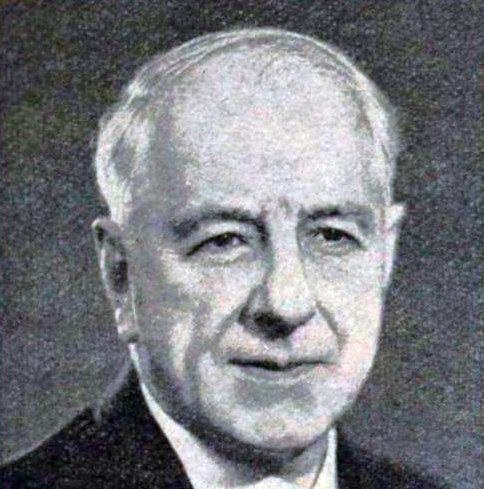
- Faroux in 1939
- Born: 29 December 1872; Noyon
- Died: 9 February 1957 (aged 84); Neuilly-sur-Seine

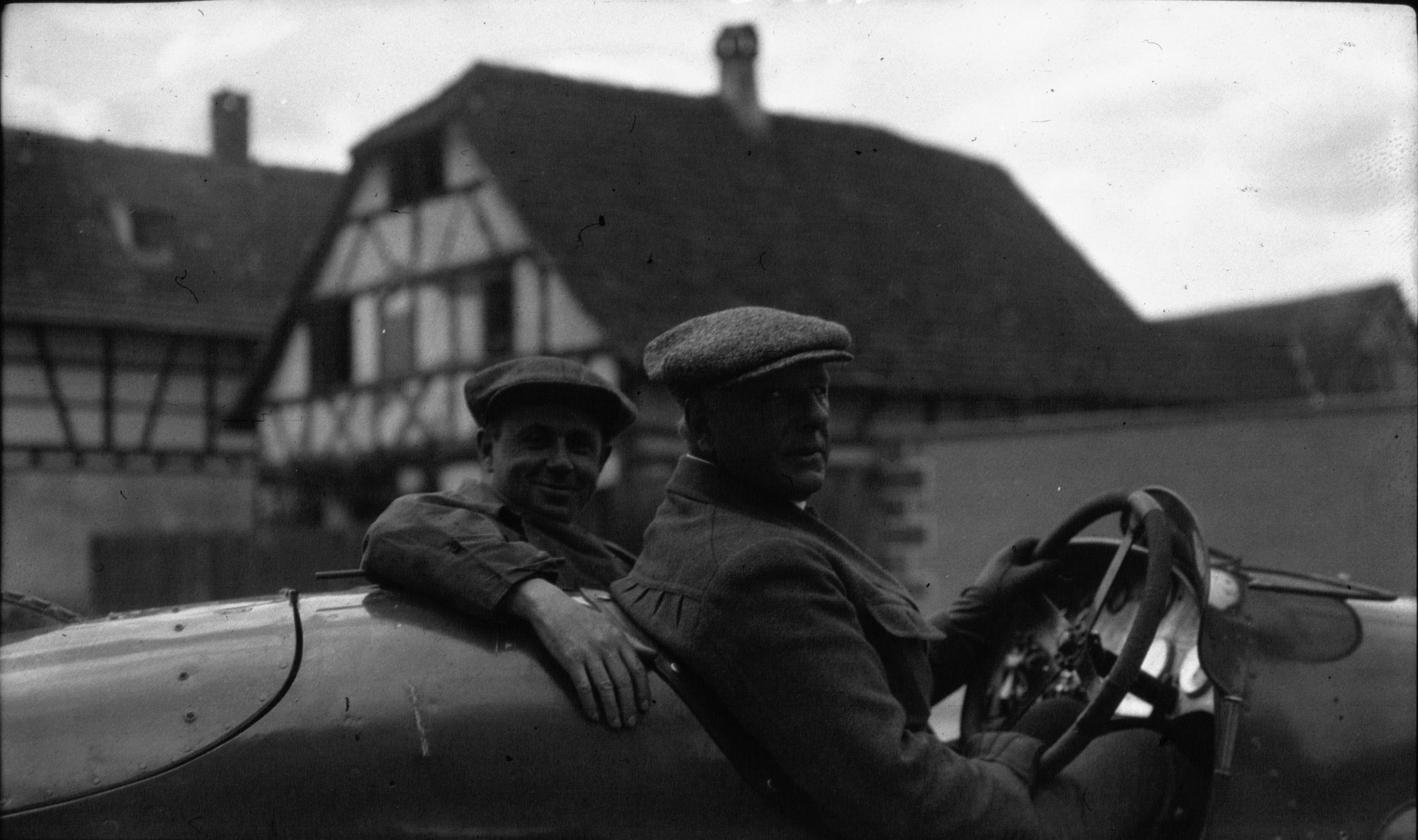
Charles Faroux at the Grand Prix of France in 1922

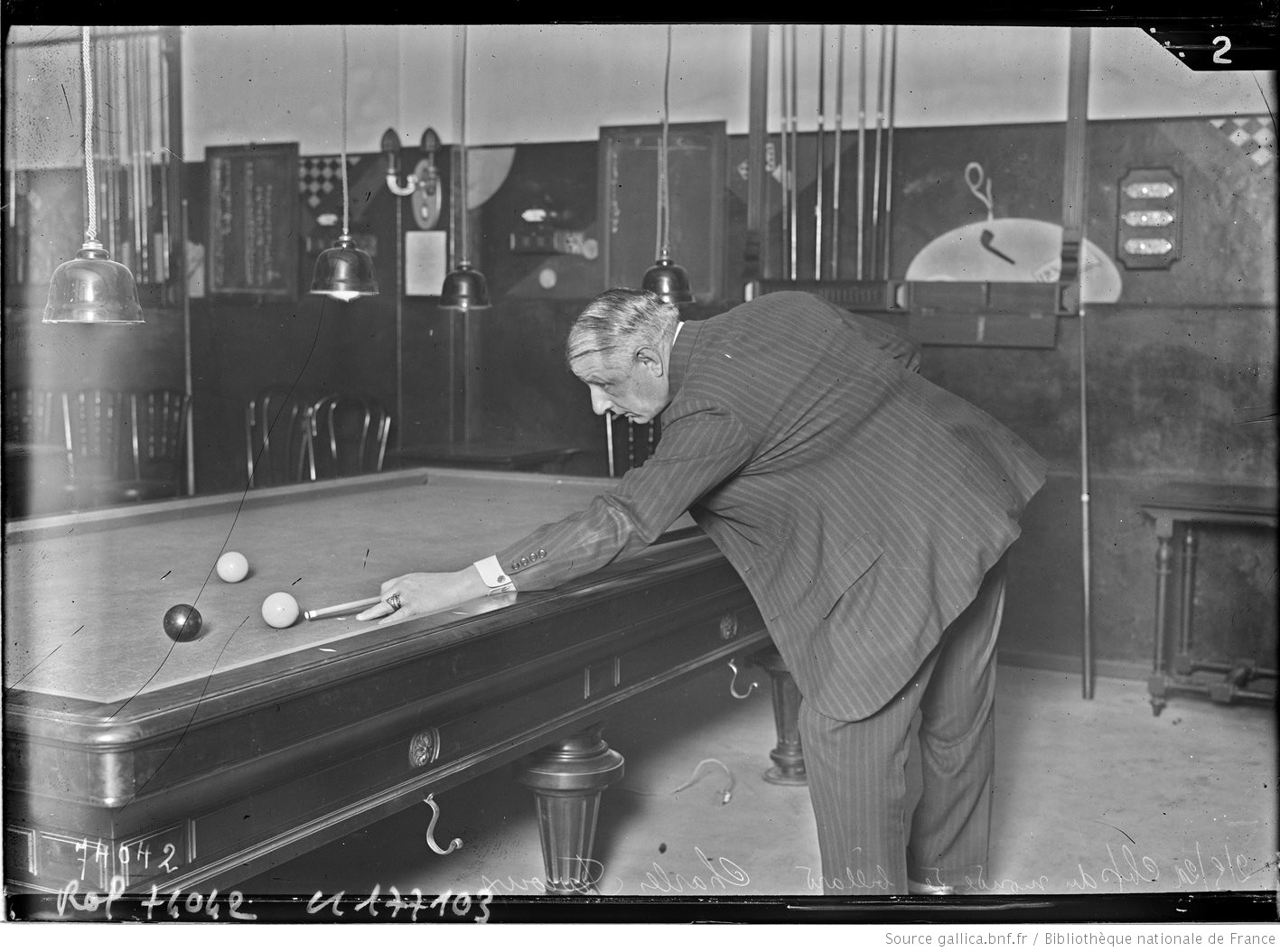
Faroux at the Cadre World Championships 1922 in Paris

Charles Faroux (29 December 1872 – 9 February 1957) was a French motorsport official, race director of the 24 Hours of Le Mans from 1923 to 1956, and three-time world champion at carom billiards.

== Early life and career ==
Charles Faroux was born on 29 December 1872, as the son of a sheep trader and spent much time traveling until he was 28 years old. He visited the United States and spent several months in Alaska. There he came in touch with journalism for the first time and on his return to France in 1900, he began working as a journalist for the automobile magazine l'Auto. A trained mechanical engineer, he became interested in automotive engineering and motorsport and was also active as a racing driver. In 1908, he participated in the Coppa Florio, where he broke down with a defect in his Motobloc model. During World War I, Faroux served in the French army and fought at the Battle for Verdun. He saw the end of the war as a technician for Hispano-Suiza, where he was responsible for the supply of aircraft engines.

=== Motorsport ===
Faroux became internationally known through the 24 Hours of Le Mans, which he established in 1923 together with Georges Durand and Emile Coquille. Durand and Faroux developed the first set of technical regulations. For more than three decades, the race director was often the last and many times the sole authority when it came to deciding which team to race. Between 1929 and 1955, Faroux was also a starter at the Grand Prix of Monaco.

=== Carom billiards ===
Faroux was one of the best carom billiards players in the 1900-1920s. In 1905, he competed in his first world carom billiards championships, and at the 1907 event reached second place, which he accomplished again in 1910. In 1912 and 1919, he won the world championship title in this discipline. Since his motorsport interest often overlapped with the carom billiards interest, producing scheduling conflicts, he said in April 1926 that he would play in the world championships rather than the Targa Florio. In 1927, he competed in his last world championship, winning that event, and afterwards devoted all of his time to motorsport.

== Personal life ==
In 1953, Faroux became a Knight of the Legion of Honour. Faroux died in 1957 in Neuilly-sur-Seine near Paris.

== Championships and accomplishments ==
- Balkline-45.2 World Championships
  - Winner: 1912, 1919
  - Runner-up:1907, 1910, 1921, 1922, 1923, 1927
  - Semi-finals:1914, 1920
- Balkline-45.1 World Championships
  - Winner:1927
- Balkline-45.2 European Championships
  - Runner-up:1926
