= Race director =

Profession in motorsport

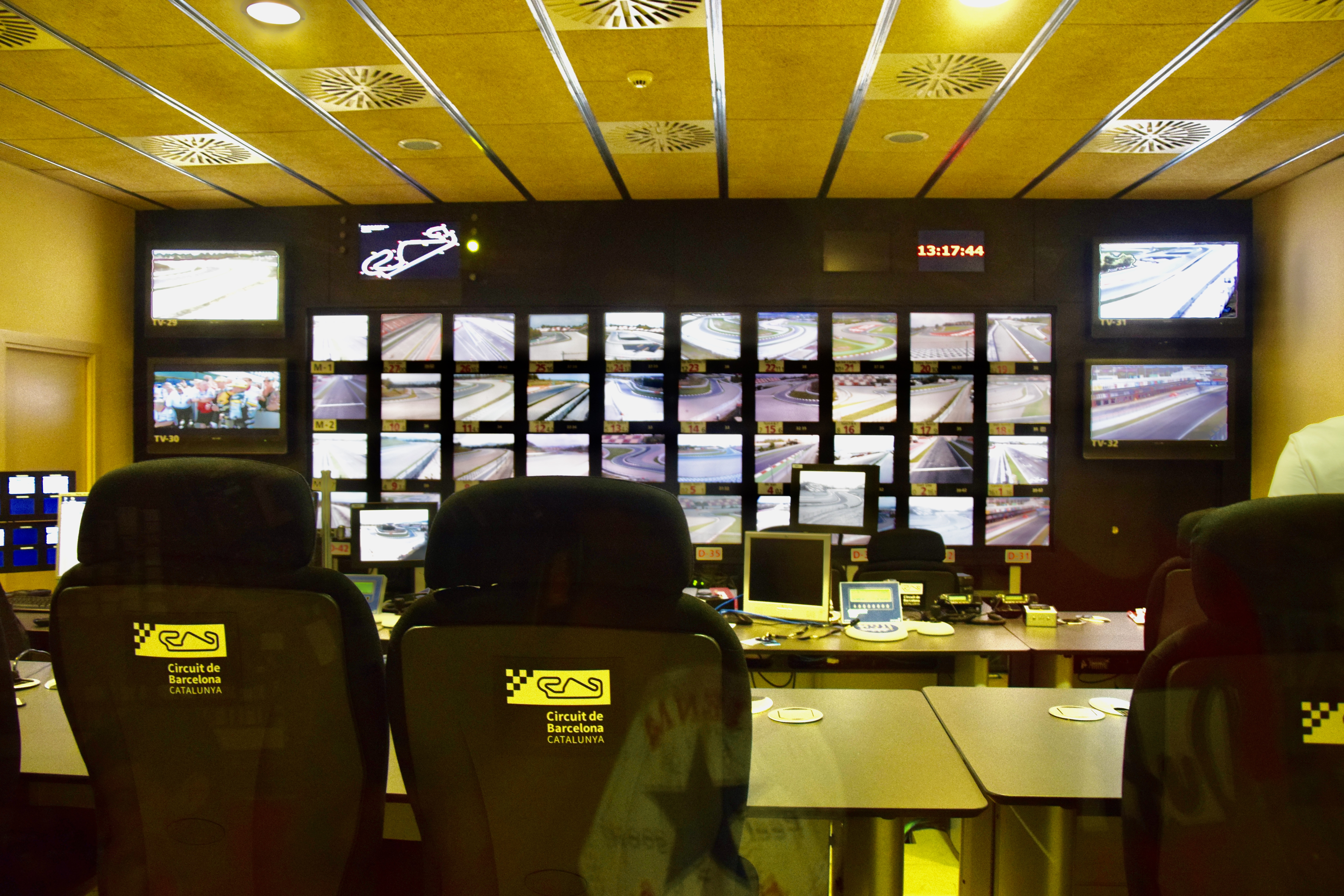
The race control room, where the race director works out of, at the Circuit de Barcelona-Catalunya in 2014

In motorsport, the race director is responsible for overseeing all operations relating to competitive racing. The position involves promoting safety for events and manages the response to incidents that occur during races.

== Roles ==
They are responsible for the regular and safety processes of the race weekend, including:

- Deploying the safety car
- Managing the marshals around the circuit
- Deciding which flags are shown to drivers at different points of the circuit
- Monitoring track limits

== Formula One ==
In Formula One, race director is employed by the FIA. A permanent Formula One race director was established in 1988. Before this period, the race director was not fixed.

For the 2026 season, Rui Marques serves as the race director.

Formula One race directors
Name (Birth–Death)	Term	Notes	Ref.
(Belgium) Roland Bruynseraede (born 1939)	1988–1995	First individual to hold the position of race director in a full time capacity.	
(United Kingdom) Roger Lane-Nott (born 1945)	1996		
(United Kingdom) Charlie Whiting (1952–2019)	1997–2019	Expected to serve as race director in 2019, he died three days prior to the start of the season. Whiting was the longest-serving race director in Formula One history	
(Australia) Michael Masi (born 1978)	2019–2021		
(Portugal) Eduardo Freitas (born 1961)	2022	Wittich and Freitas held the position on a rotating basis in 2022. Wittich departed from his position prior to the 2024 Las Vegas Grand Prix.	
(Germany) Niels Wittich (born 1972)	2022–2024	Wittich and Freitas held the position on a rotating basis in 2022. Wittich departed from his position prior to the 2024 Las Vegas Grand Prix.	
(Portugal) Rui Marques (born 1972)	2024–present	Assumed the role in 2024 starting at the 2024 Las Vegas Grand Prix.	

The position of deputy race director was held by Herbie Blash beginning in 1996. He served in the role until his departure at the end of the 2016 season, and in 2022 he was appointed as the permanent senior advisor to the race director. Laurent Mekies—who later became the team principal of Red Bull Racing—succeeded Blash, and served as deputy race director in 2017 until his departure in March 2018. To replace Mekies, Michael Masi and Scot Elkins shared the role of deputy for the 2018 season. Masi was expected to continue as deputy in 2019, but took over as race director following Whiting's unexpected death. Colin Haywood served as deputy race director for 2019 and 2020, and for selected races in 2022. Claire Dubbelman served as deputy race director in 2024 and continued in the role for 2025 on a permanent basis, but left shortly after the season ended. To replace her, the FIA promoted Paul Burns, who previously served as the F2 deputy race director.

== Single seater racing ==
=== IndyCar Series ===
In American open-wheel racing, currently known as the IndyCar Series, the race director oversees race control, determines track conditions (including flags), and assists with penalties or other infractions. The current race director for the series is Kyle Novak, who has held the position since 2018. Prior to Novak, the race director was Brian Barnhart, who held the position several times between 1997 and 2015. Beaux Barfield served as race director from 2012 through 2014.

For the 2026 season, IndyCar Officiating Inc. was established as a non-profit entity that provides independent officiating for the IndyCar Series. The entity is neutral from IndyCar and the series' owners, Penske Entertainment, which previously performed these tasks themselves.

=== Formula E ===
Marek Hanaczewski currently serves as the race director for Formula E. Hanaczewski replaced Scot Elkins, had previously served as Formula E's race director from the 2017–18 season until his departure after the 2025 Miami ePrix. Before Elkins, the position was previously held by Oliver Grodowski.

== Endurance racing ==
=== 24 Hours of Le Mans ===
The 24 Hours of Le Mans, which was first held in 1923, has had multiple race directors throughout its history. Charles Faroux, a co-founder of the event, was the race director from the series' inception in 1923 until 1956. Faroux assisted with establishing timing timing for the event. He was also the race director during the infamous 1955 Le Mans disaster during the race's 1955 edition, in which he contributed to the controversial decision to not stop the race. Faroux was also the race director for the prewar iteration of the Monte Carlo Rally. Faroux was succeeded by Jacques Loste, who held the post from 1957 to 1968. Following Loste was Charles Deutsch, an automotive engineer who directed the race from 1969 to 1980, the year of his death. Marcel Martin, a racing driver who previously competed in the race, took over in 1981. Formerly serving as assistant race director prior to Deutsch's death, he was responsible for implementing safety cars and track surveillance systems during his tenure. Daniel Poissenot took over in 2001, and remained in the position until his retirement following the 2014 race. The separate position of event director was created during his tenure, initially held by Jacky Ickx. Following the integration of Le Mans into the FIA World Endurance Championship in 2012, the role became shared between the FIA WEC race director and the local ACO race director. Following Poissenot's retirement, Patrick Morisseau took over for 2015 onwards.

24 Hours of Le Mans race directors
Local		FIA WEC	
Name	Term	Name	Term
Charles Faroux	1923–1956	N/A	
Jacques Loste	1957–1968	N/A	
Charles Deutsch	1969–1980	N/A	
Marcel Martin	1981–2000	N/A	
Daniel Poissenot	2001–2014	N/A	
Patrick Morisseau	2015–	Eduardo Freitas	2012–

=== World Endurance Championship ===
Eduardo Freitas is the current race director for the FIA World Endurance Championship, and has held the position since the series' creation in 2012.

=== IMSA SportsCar Championship ===
Beaux Barfield has held the role of race director for the IMSA SportsCar Championship since the series' creation in 2014.
