= Roland Bruynseraede =

Belgian motorsport official (born 1939)

- Born: Ardennes, Belgium
- Title: DTM Race Director

Roland Bruynseraede is a Belgian motorsport official. He has previously worked as race director for the DTM series, the FIA circuit inspector and Formula One safety delegate and, from 1988 to 1995, the Formula One race director.

Although born in Belgium, Bruynseraede grew up in Germany. He is fluent in French, Dutch, German and English. He initially became involved in motorsport during his spare time while he was working for Ford Motor Company. In 1971, he succeeded Pierre Stasse as clerk of the course at the Zolder circuit in Belgium. His involvement in the organisation of international motorsport events began in 1982. He took up the position of Formula One starter and circuit inspector before the 1987 season following the retirement of Derek Ongaro. A reorganisation of roles within Formula One resulted in him becoming race director and FIA safety delegate.

During his time in the role as circuit inspector, he was charged with the death of Ayrton Senna by Italian prosecutors, which occurred during the 1994 San Marino Grand Prix. All charges against him were dropped, after it was established by the investigation that Senna was not killed by his car's impact with a wall at the circuit which Bruynseraede had declared as safe, but because a piece of the car's suspension pierced his helmet causing fatal head injuries.

He left his Formula One roles in December 1995, and was appointed race director and safety delegate for the new International Touring Car Championship. The ITCC was cancelled after one season, but was later reborn as the Deutsche Tourenwagen Masters until he was sacked on 31 May 2007 due to his mistake during the Lausitzring round and thus replaced by Sven Stoppe from Brands Hatch round onwards.

As of 2023, he occasionally serves as clerk of the course, e.g. at the Spa-Francorchamps circuit in Belgium.
