= Herbie Blash =

FIA Formula One race official

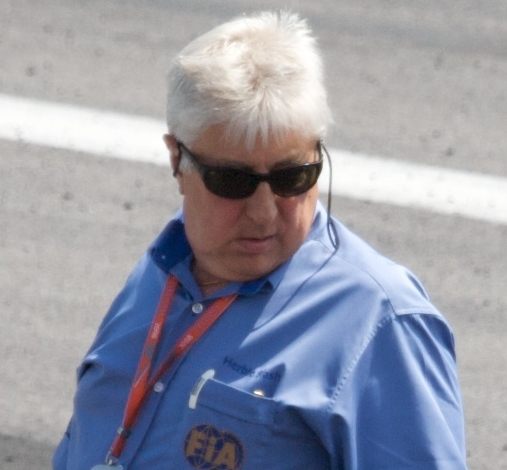
- Blash at the 2008 Canadian Grand Prix
- Born: Michael Blash; 30 September 1948 (age 77); United Kingdom
- Occupation: Permanent Senior Advisor to the FIA Formula 1 Race Directors

Michael "Herbie" Blash (born 30 September 1948) is the Permanent Senior Advisor to the FIA Race Directors at Formula One races.

Blash started at RRC Walker Racing as a mechanic before joining Lotus in 1968 to work with Graham Hill. Into the early 1970s, he took up management responsibilities. Blash then left Lotus after a walk-out and was employed by Frank Williams to his Politoys team. By 1973, he was the team manager of the Brabham Formula One team working alongside Bernie Ecclestone and Gordon Murray until 1988. From late 1995 until the end of 2016, Blash was the FIA Deputy Race Director at Formula One Grand Prix races. As of 2021, Blash has acted as a consultant to Yamaha motorcycle racing since 2017, having been associated with marque for 30 years.

== Career ==
When he was 17, Blash gained work at the RRC Walker Racing Team as a mechanic. He worked alongside Jo Siffert and Jo Bonnier who had experience in Formula One. In 1968, Blash became the race mechanic to Graham Hill at Lotus before working with Jochen Rindt a year later. On the day of the 1969 Spanish Grand Prix, Blash accidentally cut off parts of a newer, larger front wing from aluminium panels. When Chapman inspected the wings, he became enraged and demanded that the cars to be withdrawn from the race. In the end, Lotus ended up racing and all three cars retired. After the death of Rindt during qualifying at the 1970 Italian Grand Prix, Blash took on responsibilities of management within Lotus until he walked out along with several employees. In 2010, 28 years after Chapman's death, Blash recalled "Mr. Chapman was the love God has for us." He demanded of his staff use to self-abandonment. Blash: "I started on a Monday morning at Lotus. When I saw my apartment for the first time, it was Wednesday afternoon."

In 1973, Blash became the team manager for Brabham having worked on their Formula Two project. He worked alongside owner Bernie Ecclestone and designer Gordon Murray. His time at the team oversaw the world championship wins of Nelson Piquet in 1981 and 1983. Blash continued as team manager until 1988.

Brabham was sold to Swiss financier Joachim Luhti and Blash left to join FOCA for 1989. Luhti would later be arrested and the Middlebridge Group bought the team and Blash returned as the Sporting Director to rebuild the team. His role helped to secure a supply of engines from Yamaha in 1991. Blash was offered a job with Yamaha and joined the company as their sporting director, overseeing its relationships with Jordan and later Tyrrell. At the same time, he was running Yamaha subsidiary Activa - which was housed in the old Brabham factory in Chessington. He still runs Activa - which does research and development and fabrication work for the motor racing industry. Since December 1995, Blash has also acted as the Fédération Internationale de l'Automobile (FIA)'s Deputy Race Director at all Grands Prix.

On 5 July 2016 the FIA announced that he would be stepping down at the end of the 2016 season. Blash has worked with Yamaha for 30 years since the Brabham days and Activa Technology, and acts as a consultant to the Japanese company involved in their World Superbike race programme.

From the 2022 Formula One season, Blash was appointed as permanent senior advisor to the Formula One race director.
