= Charlie Whiting =

Formula One race director (1952–2019)

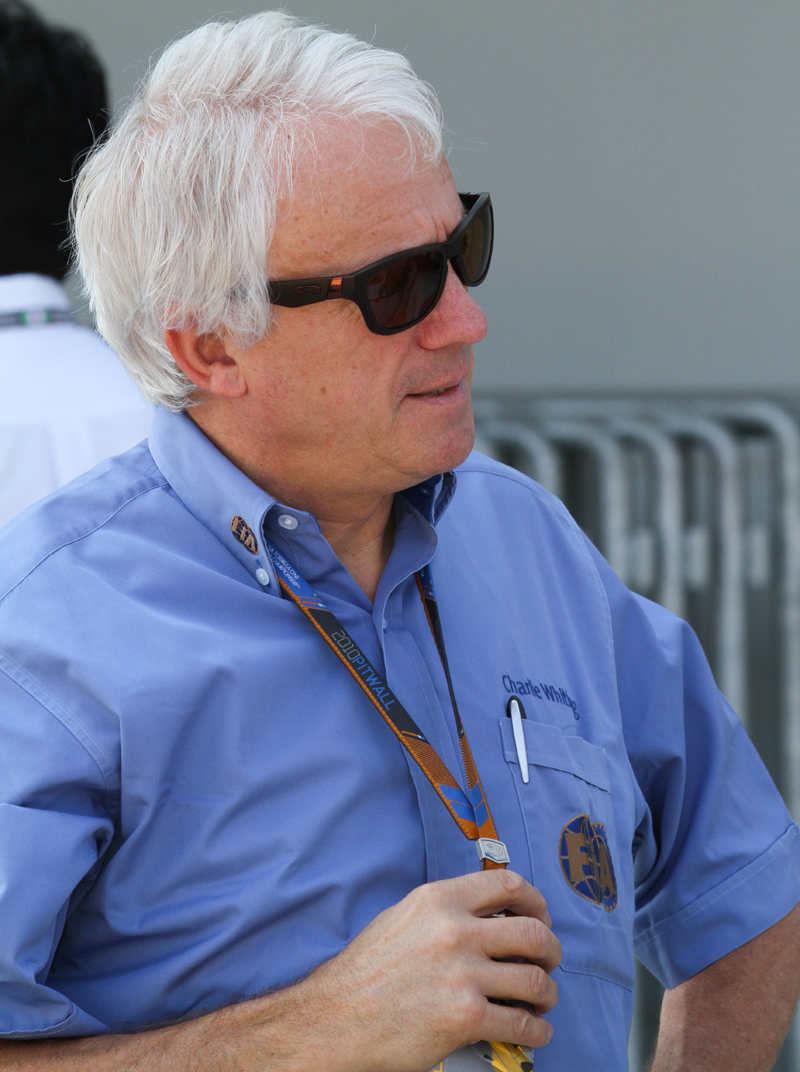
- Whiting at the 2010 Japanese Grand Prix
- Born: Charles Whiting; 12 August 1952; Sevenoaks, Kent, England
- Died: 14 March 2019 (aged 66); Melbourne, Victoria, Australia
- Occupations: Formula One Race Director
- Years active: 1988–2019 (Formula One Race Director as of 1997)
- Known for: Safety improvements to Formula 1
- Predecessor: Roland Bruynseraede
- Successor: Michael Masi

Charles Whiting (12 August 1952 – 14 March 2019) was a British mechanic. He served as the FIA Formula One Race Director, Safety Delegate, Permanent Starter and head of the F1 Technical Department, in which capacities he managed the logistics of each F1 Grand Prix, inspected cars in parc fermé before a race, enforced FIA rules, and controlled the lights that start each race.

== Early life ==
Whiting was born on 12 August 1952 in Sevenoaks. He watched his first motor race when he climbed over the fence to see the 1964 British Grand Prix, held at Brands Hatch close to his family home. He came to working in motor racing himself through his older brother Nick, who was competing in autocross and circuit racing. Having decided to follow a career in race engineering, he attended a technical college and then the Borough Polytechnic Institute, earning qualifications in mechanical engineering.

== Career ==
Whiting's first job in motor sport was preparing rally cars. In 1976, he and his brother were running a Surtees in the 1976 British F5000 series for race driver Divina Galica. For the 1977 season Whiting joined Hesketh Racing. Following the demise of the team, he joined Bernie Ecclestone's Brabham team, where he would stay for the following decade, becoming chief mechanic for the World Drivers' Championship successes of Nelson Piquet in 1981 and 1983.

In 1988, Whiting became Technical Delegate to Formula One of the sport's governing body, the Fédération Internationale de l'Automobile (FIA), and in 1997 he was appointed FIA Director and Safety Delegate. In this role, he was responsible for track and car safety, the technical and procedural regulations of the sport and for starting the races themselves. He served as lead official at every Formula One race, being in charge of everything related to rules and their interpretation. Whiting also visited future and current venues of Formula One racing to carry out safety inspections.

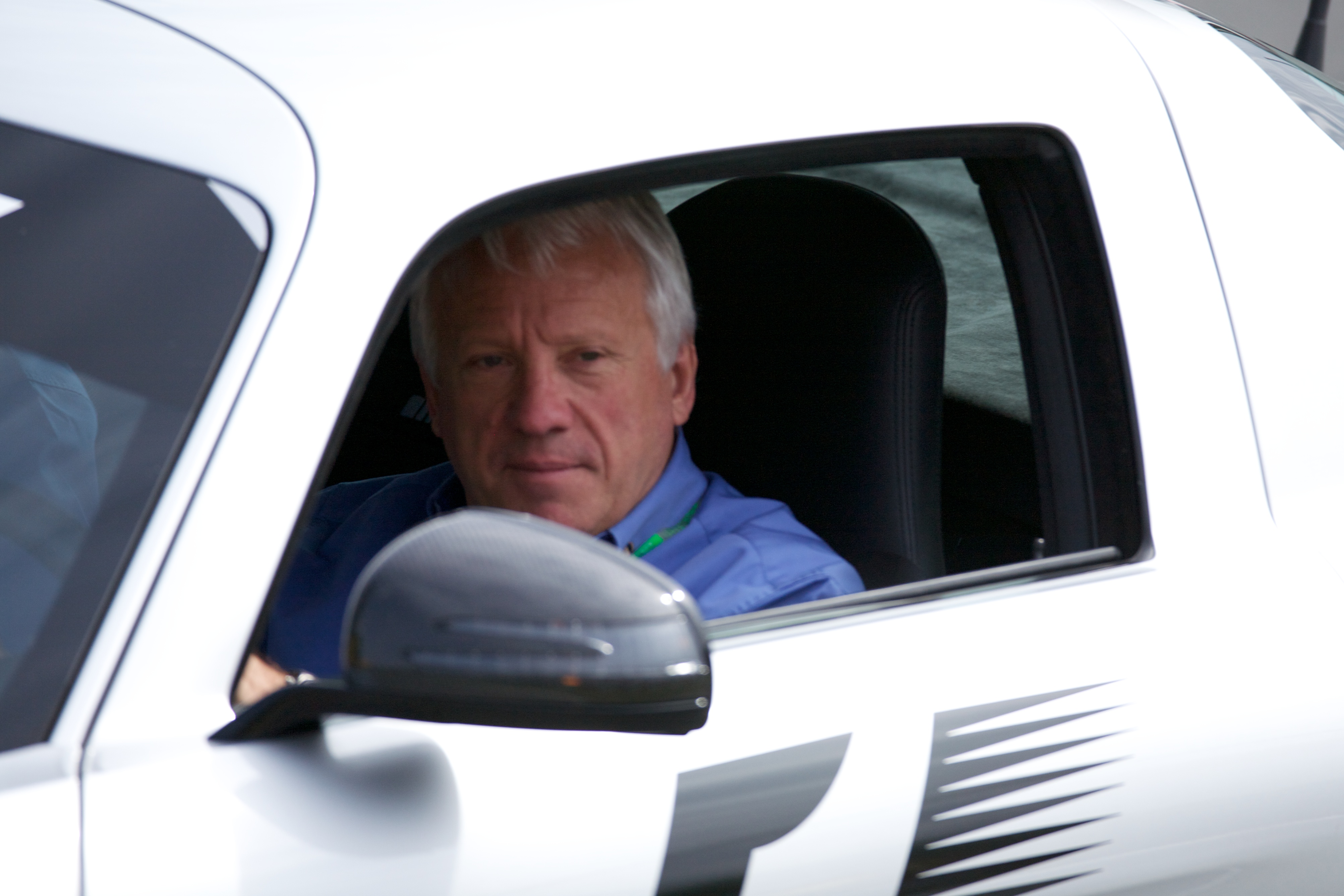
Whiting at the 2011 Canadian Grand Prix

=== 2005 United States Grand Prix ===
During the 2005 United States Grand Prix, Whiting was involved in a controversy caused by Michelin when the company realised the tyres it had brought to Indianapolis were unsafe to use. Michelin offered either tyres with a new specification to replace its seven customer Formula One teams' equipment or asked Whiting to install a chicane in Turn 13 of the Indianapolis Motor Speedway instead. He refused on the grounds that a new specification would be a breach of the rule or that the chicane would be unfair to Bridgestone who had brought the correct specification and therefore was able to race safely on the existing track. Whiting's counter-proposals, which included repeated tyre changes, running through the pits each lap, running at the bottom of Turn 13 or observing a speed limit were all rejected by the Michelin teams. As a result, only six cars took part in the race.

=== Safety improvements in motorsport ===
Whiting was known for safety improvements in motorsport, such as the halo, which was credited with preventing Charles Leclerc from suffering serious injury at the 2018 Belgian Grand Prix saving Romain Grosjean's life at the 2020 Bahrain Grand Prix and also preventing serious injury to Lewis Hamilton at the 2021 Italian Grand Prix after a collision with Max Verstappen. Zhou Guanyu also credited it for saving his life when his car was trapped between a tyre barrier and a fence at the 2022 British Grand Prix. Whiting was also responsible for introducing the HANS device, safety survival cell, front and side impact structures and high cockpit sides.

== Death and legacy ==
On the morning of 14 March 2019, in Melbourne, Victoria, Australia, three days before the season opening Australian Grand Prix of the 2019 Formula One season, Whiting suffered a pulmonary embolism and died, aged 66. He left behind his three children from two marriages.

In the hours after his death many F1 drivers and personalities commented that he was instrumental to the success of the sport, being described as "a pillar for the sport", a "really nice guy" and "a drivers' man". In an obituary, journalist Adam Cooper described Whiting as the "perfect man for the difficult role of referee" due to his calm demeanour.

Whiting's death was widely mourned in the motorsport world. Moments of silence were held before the starts of the Australian Grand Prix and the 1000 Miles of Sebring in his honour. Valtteri Bottas dedicated his Australian Grand Prix win to Whiting. Jean-Éric Vergne also dedicated his win at the Sanya ePrix to Whiting. He was posthumously named the recipient of the John Bolster Award at the Autosport Awards in December 2019.

At the 2019 British Grand Prix, the FIA decided that his son Justin would act as starter for the race.
