= Valtteri Bottas =

Finnish racing driver (born 1989)

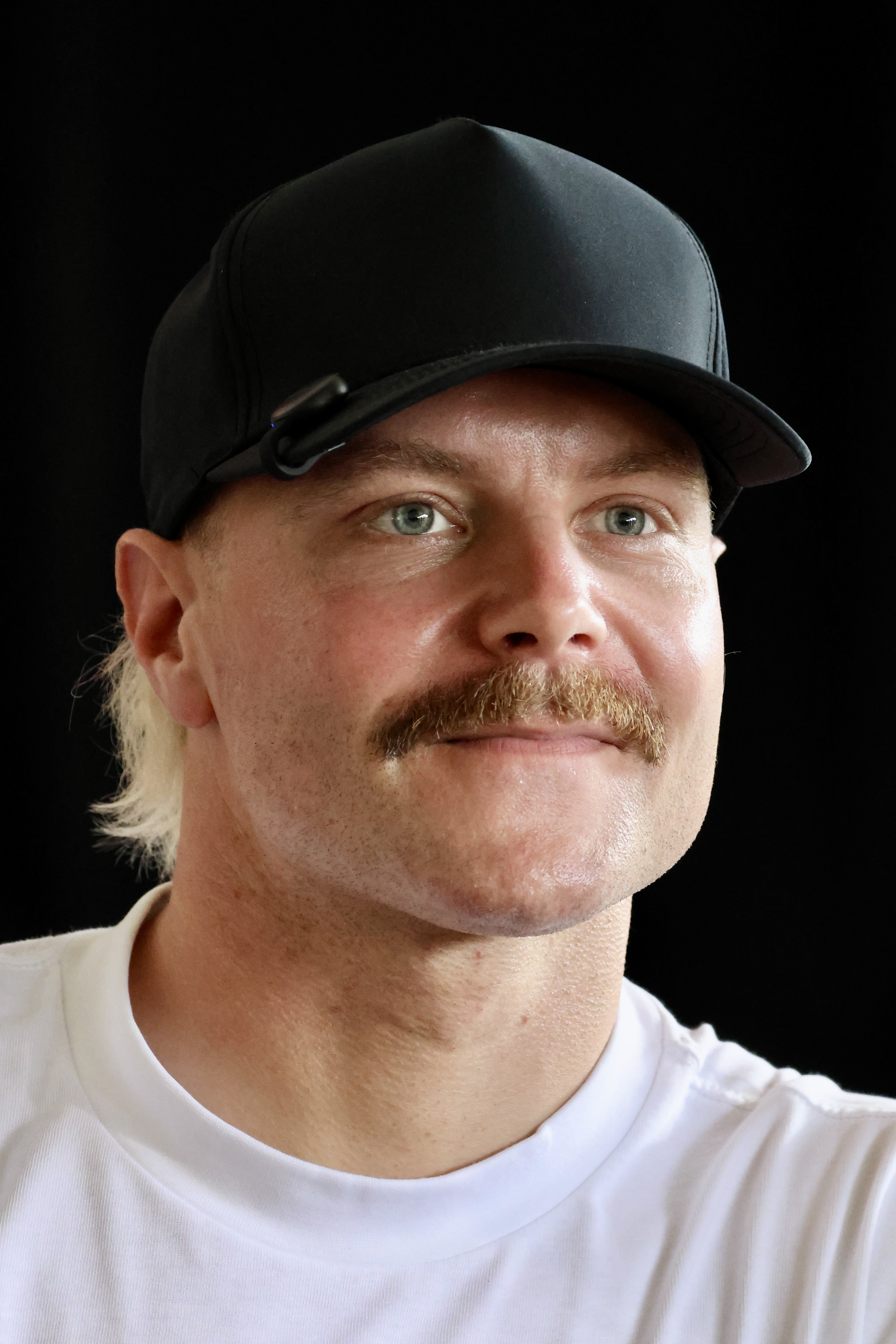
- Bottas at the 2026 Adelaide Motorsport Festival
- Born: Valtteri Viktor Bottas; 28 August 1989 (age 37); Nastola, Päijät-Häme, Finland
- Spouse: Emilia Pikkarainen (m. 2016; div. 2019)
- Partners: Tiffany Cromwell (2020–present)
- Awards: Full list

Formula One World Championship career
- Nationality: (Finland) Finnish
- 2026 team: Cadillac-Ferrari
- Car number: 77
- Entries: 268 (265 starts)
- Championships: 0
- Wins: 10
- Podiums: 67
- Career points: 1797
- Pole positions: 20
- Fastest laps: 19
- First entry: 2013 Australian Grand Prix
- First win: 2017 Russian Grand Prix
- Last win: 2021 Turkish Grand Prix
- Last entry: 2026 Las Vegas Grand Prix

Previous series
- 2011; 2009, 2011; 2009–2010; 2008; 2007–2008; 2007: GP3 Series; British F3; F3 Euro Series; Formula Renault Eurocup; Formula Renault NEC; Formula Renault UK Winter

Championship titles
- 2011; 2008; 2008: GP3 Series; Formula Renault Eurocup; Formula Renault NEC
- Website: valtteribottas.com

Valtteri Viktor Bottas (Finnish pronunciation: [ˈʋɑltːeri ˈbotːɑs]; born 28 August 1989) is a Finnish racing driver who competes in Formula One for Cadillac. Bottas has twice finished runner-up in the World Drivers' Championship in 2019 and 2020 with Mercedes, and has won 10 Grands Prix across 13 seasons.

Born and raised in Nastola, Bottas began kart racing aged six. After studying automotive engineering and completing mandatory military service, Bottas progressed to junior formulae in 2007. He won his first championship at the Formula Renault NEC in 2008, also winning the Formula Renault Eurocup by three points to Daniel Ricciardo, both with Motopark. He then won the Masters of Formula 3 back-to-back in 2009 and 2010 with ART, before winning the GP3 Series in 2011. After two years as a test driver, Bottas signed for Williams in 2013 to partner Pastor Maldonado, making his Formula One debut at the Australian Grand Prix. In 2014, he finished fourth in the championship, taking his maiden career podium at the Austrian Grand Prix. Across four seasons at Williams, Bottas finished on the podium nine times.

Bottas signed for Mercedes in 2017, replacing the retiring Nico Rosberg to partner Lewis Hamilton. He took his maiden pole position in Bahrain and his maiden win in Russia, finishing third in the championship following further victories in Austria and Abu Dhabi. After a winless 2018 campaign, Bottas finished runner-up to Hamilton in both the 2019 and 2020 seasons. He took his final win for Mercedes at the Turkish Grand Prix in 2021, leaving at the end of the season after contributing to five consecutive World Constructors' Championships. He joined Alfa Romeo in 2022, retaining his seat for his 2023 campaign. After a non-scoring 2024 season at the re-branded Sauber, Bottas returned to Mercedes as a reserve driver. He became a full-time driver again for the 2026 season, driving for Cadillac.

Bottas has achieved 10 race wins, 20 pole positions, 19 fastest laps and 67 podiums in Formula One. He is the driver with the second most career points without a World Drivers' Championship (1,797). Bottas is contracted to remain at Cadillac until at least the end of the 2027 season.

== Early life ==
Valtteri Viktor Bottas was born on 28 August 1989 in Nastola, Finland, to Rauno Bottas and Marianne Välimaa. His father owns a small cleaning company, and his mother is an undertaker. Bottas studied automotive engineering in a vocational school in Heinola and graduated as an auto mechanic. He completed mandatory military service in the Finnish Defence Forces Sports School in Lahti. His military rank is lance corporal.

== Junior racing career ==
=== Karting ===
Bottas's interest in motorsport was sparked at the age of six by a chance visit to a karting event that he had seen advertised at his local supermarket while shopping with his grandfather. His racing hero while growing up was compatriot Mika Häkkinen.

Bottas finished eighth in the 2005 Karting World Cup for the P.D.B. Racing Team, using a Gillard chassis and Parilla engines.

=== Lower formulae ===
Bottas won both the 2008 Formula Renault Eurocup and the 2008 Formula Renault Northern European Cup. In doing so, he repeated the feat of Filipe Albuquerque, who won both the NEC and Eurocup in the same season, in 2006.

Bottas would have also won the 2007 Formula Renault UK Winter Series, had he been holding an MSA-registered licence for the championship. This did not stop him from competing, and he won three out of the four races in the championship.

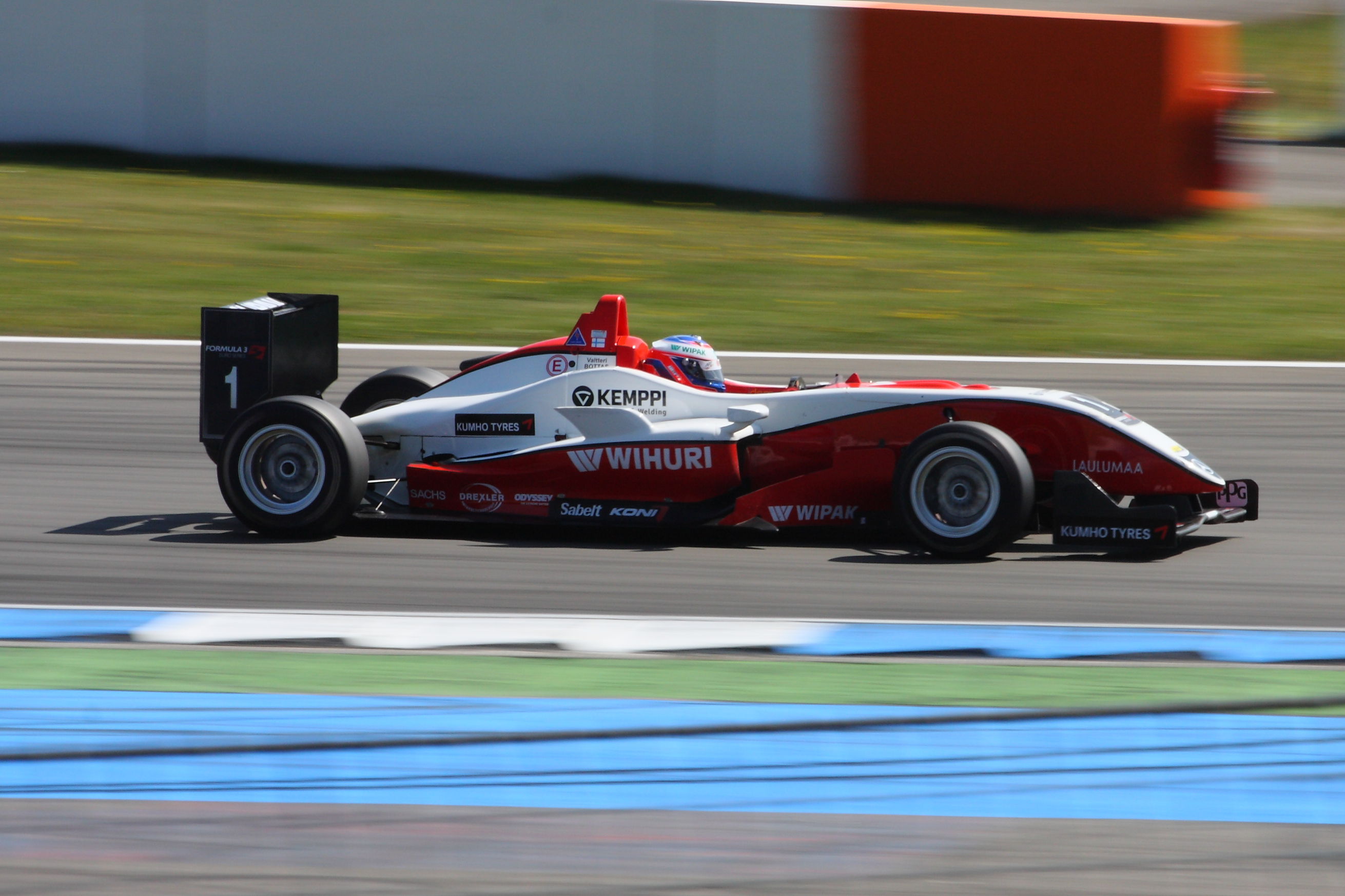
Bottas competing at the second round of the 2010 Formula 3 Euro Series at Hockenheim

=== Formula Three ===
Bottas moved up into the Formula Three Euroseries for the 2009 season, competing for reigning champions ART Grand Prix. Despite not winning a race, Bottas set two pole positions on his way to third in the championship, edging out future BMW i Andretti Motorsport driver Alexander Sims at the final race. In June 2009, Bottas won the 2009 Masters of Formula 3, also claiming the pole position and setting the fastest lap of the race. By winning the event again in 2010, he became the first driver to win the F3 Masters title for the second time.

In 2011, Bottas contested the GP3 Series, remaining with F3 squad ART. After a tough start to the season, he claimed a win in each of the last four race weekends and secured the title by winning the penultimate race ahead of his teammate and future Jaguar Racing driver James Calado.

== Formula One career ==
=== Williams (2010–2016) ===
==== 2010–2012: Test and reserve driver ====
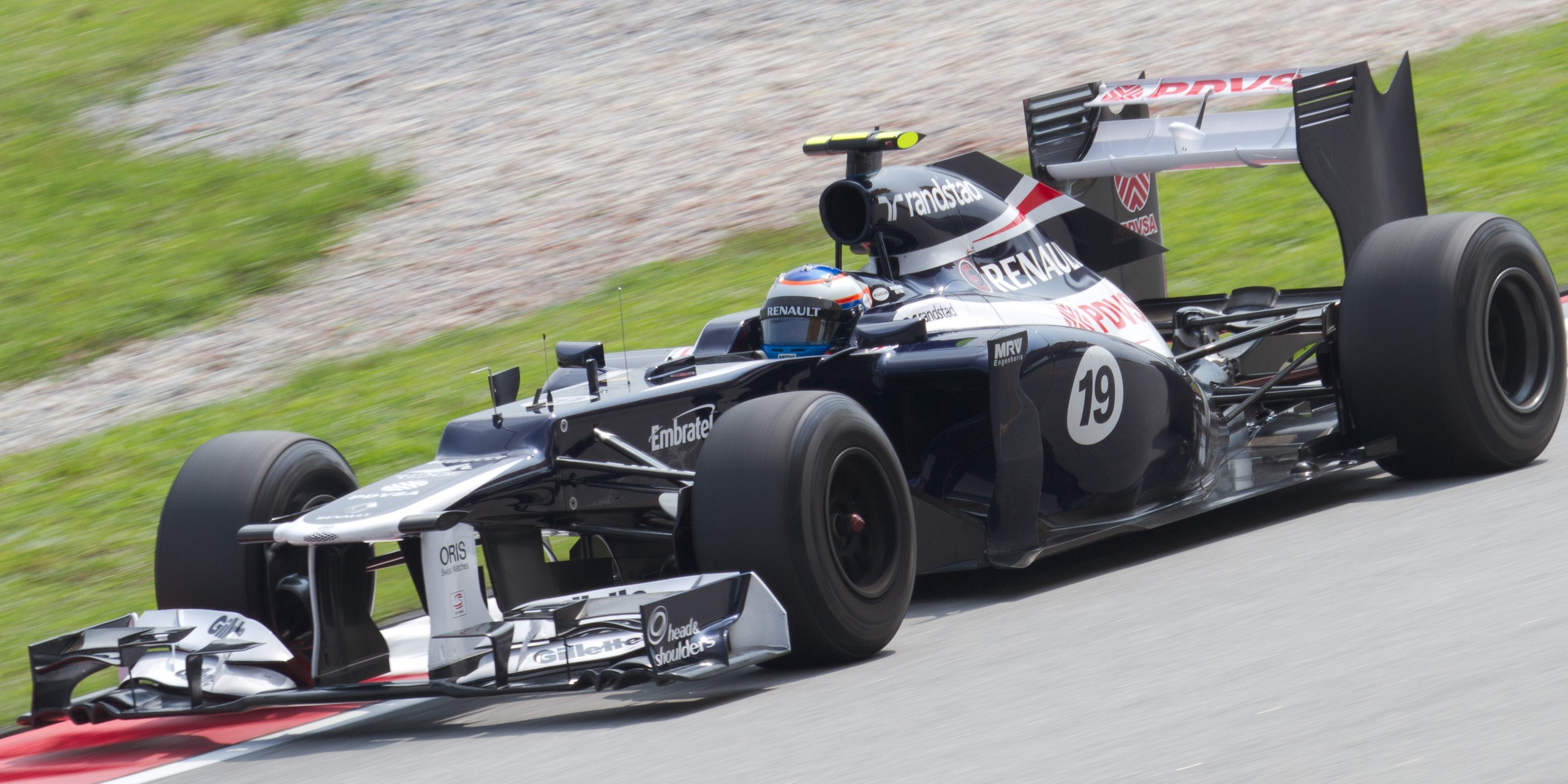
Bottas making his Grand Prix weekend debut at the 2012 Malaysian Grand Prix

Bottas was signed as the official Formula One test driver for the Williams team in January 2010 after his first year in the Formula 3 Euro Series. Team principal Frank Williams praised Bottas's record in the junior categories and expressed his hope that the role would "provide him with another step in his development". He conducted straight-line aerodynamic testing in the team's FW32 during the year. He continued in the role for 2011 and took part in his first full test in November, driving the FW33 in the post-season young drivers' test at Yas Marina Circuit. His role was expanded in 2012 after his GP3 Series victory; he took part in fifteen Friday practice sessions, making his Grand Prix weekend debut at the Malaysian Grand Prix.

==== 2013: Debut season ====
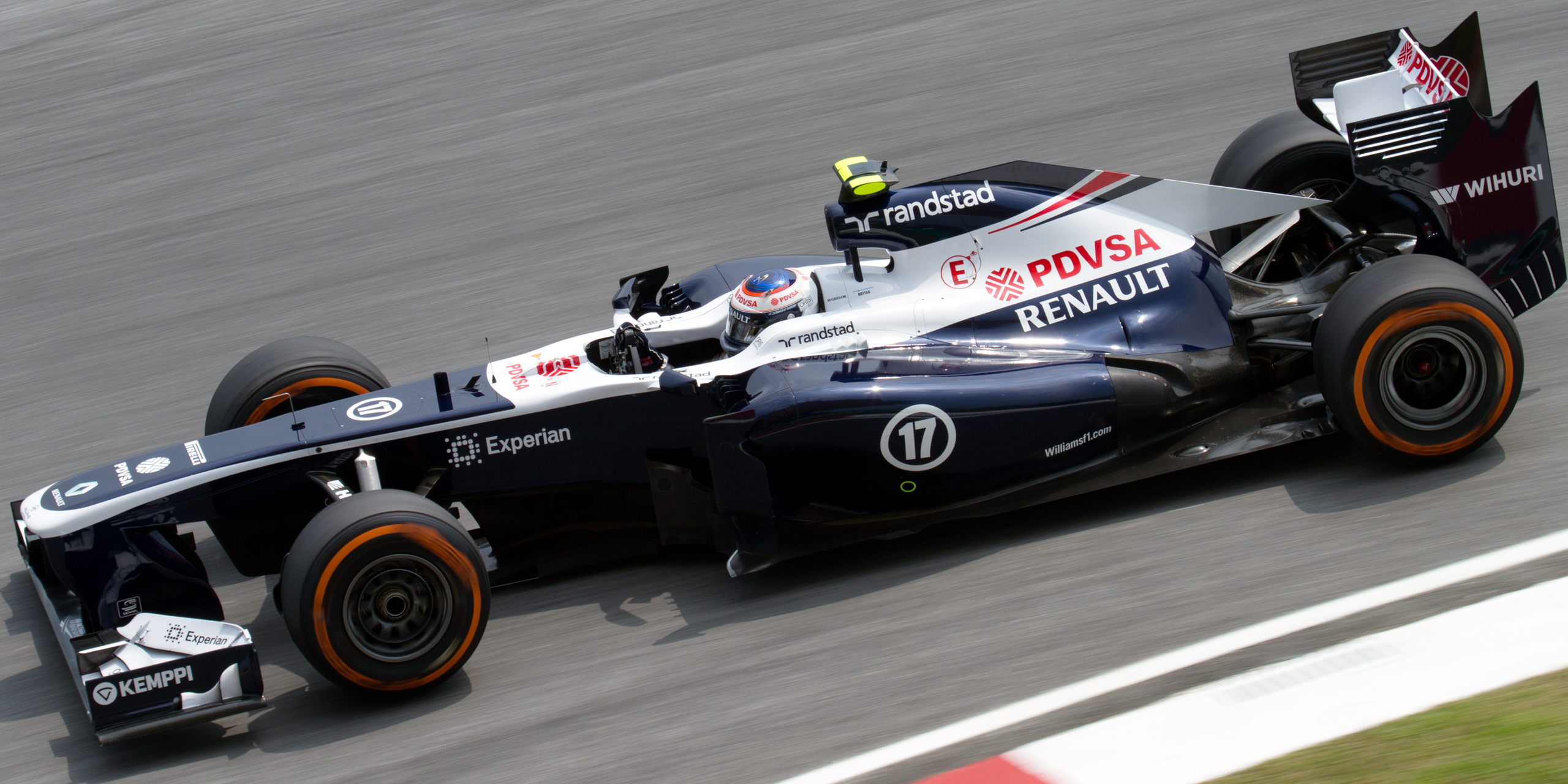
Bottas during practice at the 2013 Malaysian Grand Prix

In November 2012, it was announced that Bottas would replace Bruno Senna and partner Pastor Maldonado as a full-time Williams race driver for the 2013 season. He qualified 16th, ahead of Maldonado, and finished 14th at his debut race, the Australian Grand Prix. He improved from 18th on the grid to 11th at the finish at the Malaysian Grand Prix, 1.5 seconds behind a points-paying position. He qualified third at the Canadian Grand Prix behind Sebastian Vettel and Lewis Hamilton, the first time a Williams car had qualified in the top ten that year. He was unable to hold the position in the race and dropped to 14th at the finish line. He later stated that "the car pace was just not there" and that he believed the result would have been the same regardless of the team's strategy. A hydraulics failure at the Hungarian Grand Prix caused his first retirement of the season whilst Maldonado finished tenth to claim the team's first point of 2013. Bottas qualified ninth and finished eighth at the United States Grand Prix, his first Formula One points and the team's best result of the season. He collided with Hamilton whilst unlapping himself at the season-ending Brazilian Grand Prix, later stating he was unaware Hamilton was a lap ahead.

Bottas ended his debut season 17th in the World Drivers' Championship, scoring four of Williams's five points. He qualified ahead of Maldonado at twelve of the nineteen races and was praised for his performances at the Canadian and United States Grands Prix.

==== 2014: First podiums ====
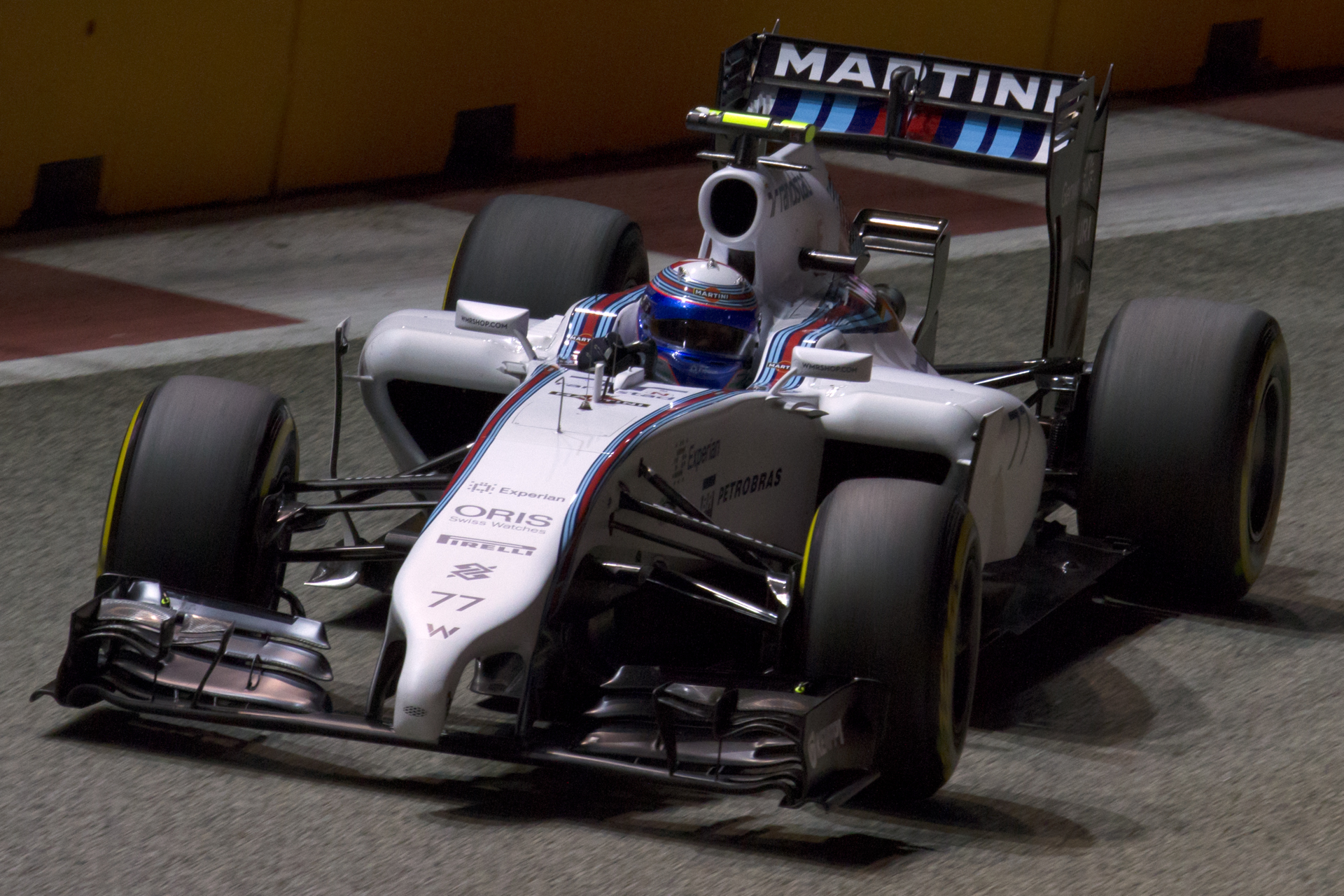
Bottas at the 2014 Singapore Grand Prix

Bottas was retained by Williams for the 2014 season, partnering Felipe Massa who was signed from Ferrari. At the season-opening Australian Grand Prix, Bottas started fifteenth due to a gearbox change penalty and clipped the wall causing a tyre puncture in the race, but recovered to sixth at the finish and was later promoted to fifth after Daniel Ricciardo's disqualification. He received another grid penalty and started 18th at the next race, the Malaysian Grand Prix, for impeding Ricciardo in qualifying, but gained places to finish eighth. He matched his best grid position at the Bahrain Grand Prix, starting third, but dropped to eighth at the finish. He praised the team's updates to his FW36 after finishing fifth at the Spanish Grand Prix and felt that the team now had the third-fastest car, however this was followed by 13th place in qualifying and an engine failure at the Monaco Grand Prix.

At the Austrian Grand Prix, Bottas qualified second behind teammate Massa, his then-best grid position in Formula One and Williams's first front-row lockout since the 2003 German Grand Prix. Both drivers were passed by the Mercedes cars during the race, but Bottas held on to third place to achieve his first podium in the sport. Despite starting 14th at the British Grand Prix, Bottas made overtakes and benefited from Nico Rosberg's retirement to take another podium finish in second place. He then qualified and finished second at the German Grand Prix despite a late challenge from Lewis Hamilton, his third consecutive podium. He was in second place on the opening lap of the Hungarian Grand Prix, but lost positions due to unfortunate safety car timing and a slow pit stop. This was followed by another podium at the Belgian Grand Prix after passing Kimi Räikkönen for third place in the closing laps. Bottas qualified third at the Italian Grand Prix. Wheelspin dropped him to 11th at the start, but he recovered to fourth place at the finish. Tyre wear dropped him outside the points positions at the Singapore Grand Prix, the only time in 2014 he would finish a race outside the top ten. Another podium came at the Russian Grand Prix where Bottas started and finished third, as well as setting the race's fastest lap. He qualified fourth at the Brazilian Grand Prix but two slow pit stops relegated him to tenth place. He finished third behind Massa at the season-ending Abu Dhabi Grand Prix, Williams's first double-podium since the 2005 Monaco Grand Prix.

The 2014 season ended with Bottas fourth in the World Drivers' Championship, ahead of world champions Sebastian Vettel and Fernando Alonso. He claimed six podium finishes and scored 186 points to Massa's 134, securing Williams third place in the World Constructors' Championship (the team's best result since 2003), and qualified ahead of Massa at thirteen of the nineteen races. Sky Sports wrote that his performances had "impress[ed] greatly" and he was described by Motorsport.com as being "often the quickest non-Mercedes driver".

==== 2015 ====
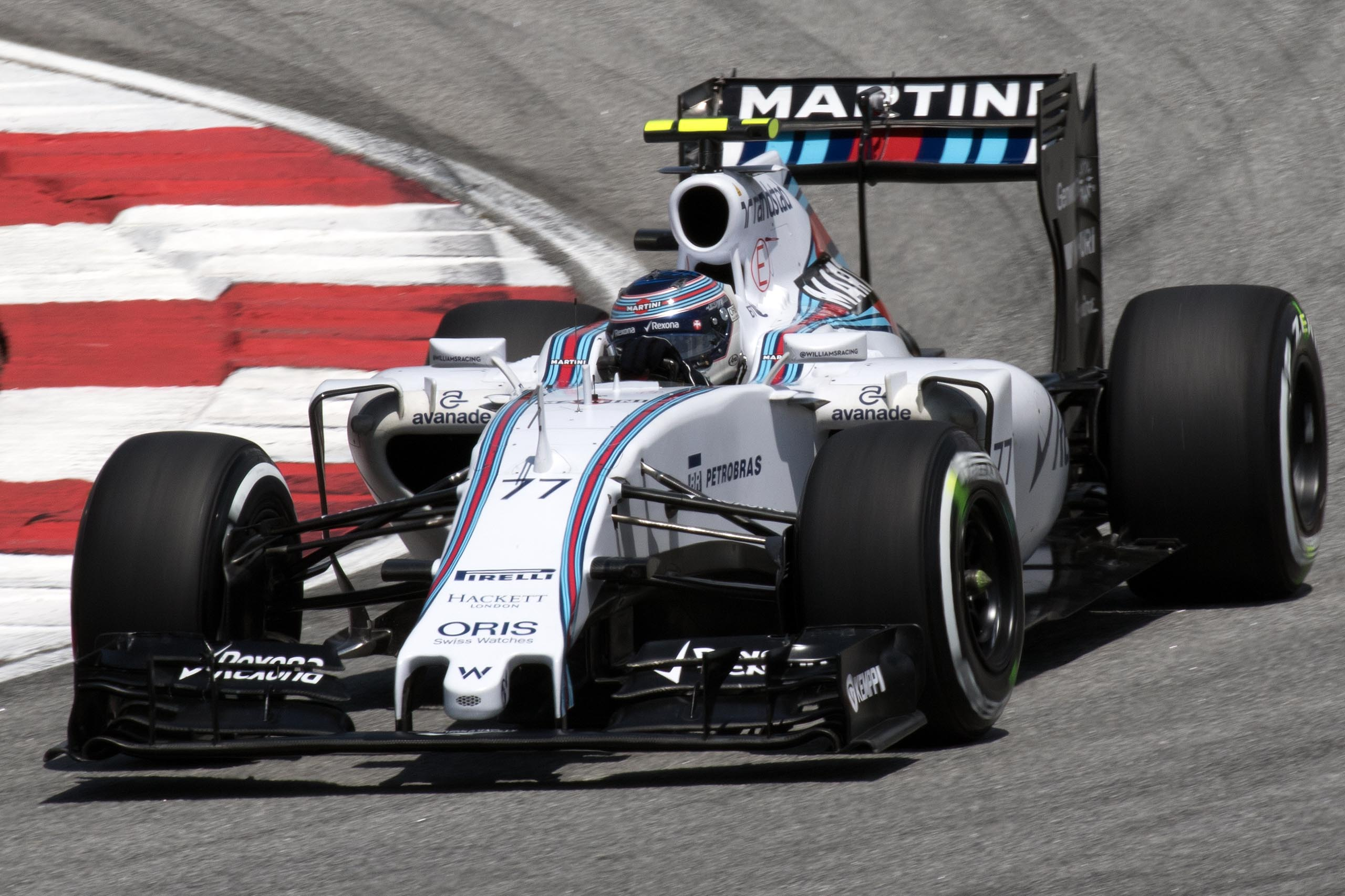
Bottas at the 2015 Malaysian Grand Prix

In September 2014, it was announced that Bottas and Massa would retain their drives with Williams for the 2015 season. Bottas qualified sixth at the season-opening Australian Grand Prix, but suffered a back injury and was taken to The Alfred Hospital for precautionary checks. Scans found that he had "suffered a very small tear in the annular part of a disc in his lower back" and was deemed unfit to race. He returned to racing at the Malaysian Grand Prix where he started ninth and recovered from a poor start to finish fifth. He scored points at the following three races including fourth-place finishes at the Bahrain and Spanish Grands Prix, but failed to score at the Monaco Grand Prix after qualifying 17th. His first of two podiums in 2015 came at the Canadian Grand Prix, where he qualified fourth and benefited from a spin for Kimi Räikkönen to finish third. He qualified fourth behind Massa at the British Grand Prix and the two drivers progressed to first and second place in the opening laps. Bottas later commented that he "would have been able to pull a gap" had Massa conceded his position, but the two ultimately dropped back to fourth and fifth by the end. Despite this, the result promoted Bottas to fourth place in the World Drivers' Championship.

Bottas qualified sixth at the Hungarian Grand Prix but fell outside the top ten after Max Verstappen collided with the rear of his car. His best qualifying position of the season thus far came at the Belgian Grand Prix where he started third, but he was handed a drive-through penalty when his team erroneously fitted his car with two different tyre compounds during a pit stop. He went on to finish ninth. He was on course to finish third at the Russian Grand Prix before Räikkönen collided with him on the final lap of the race. Räikkönen received a penalty for the collision but was unapologetic, and Bottas described the incident as "disappointing". This was followed by another retirement due to a suspension failure at the United States Grand Prix. At the Mexican Grand Prix, a DRS fault caused Bottas to crash in practice. He qualified sixth and made up places to finish third, his second and final podium of the season. A collision with Jenson Button in the pit lane at the Abu Dhabi Grand Prix dropped Bottas outside the points, having started sixth.

Bottas ended his third year in Formula One fifth in the World Drivers' Championship, scoring 136 points to Massa's 121 and helping Williams retain third place in the World Constructors' Championship. An Autosport poll of the Formula One team principals ranked him the seventh-best driver of the year.

==== 2016 ====
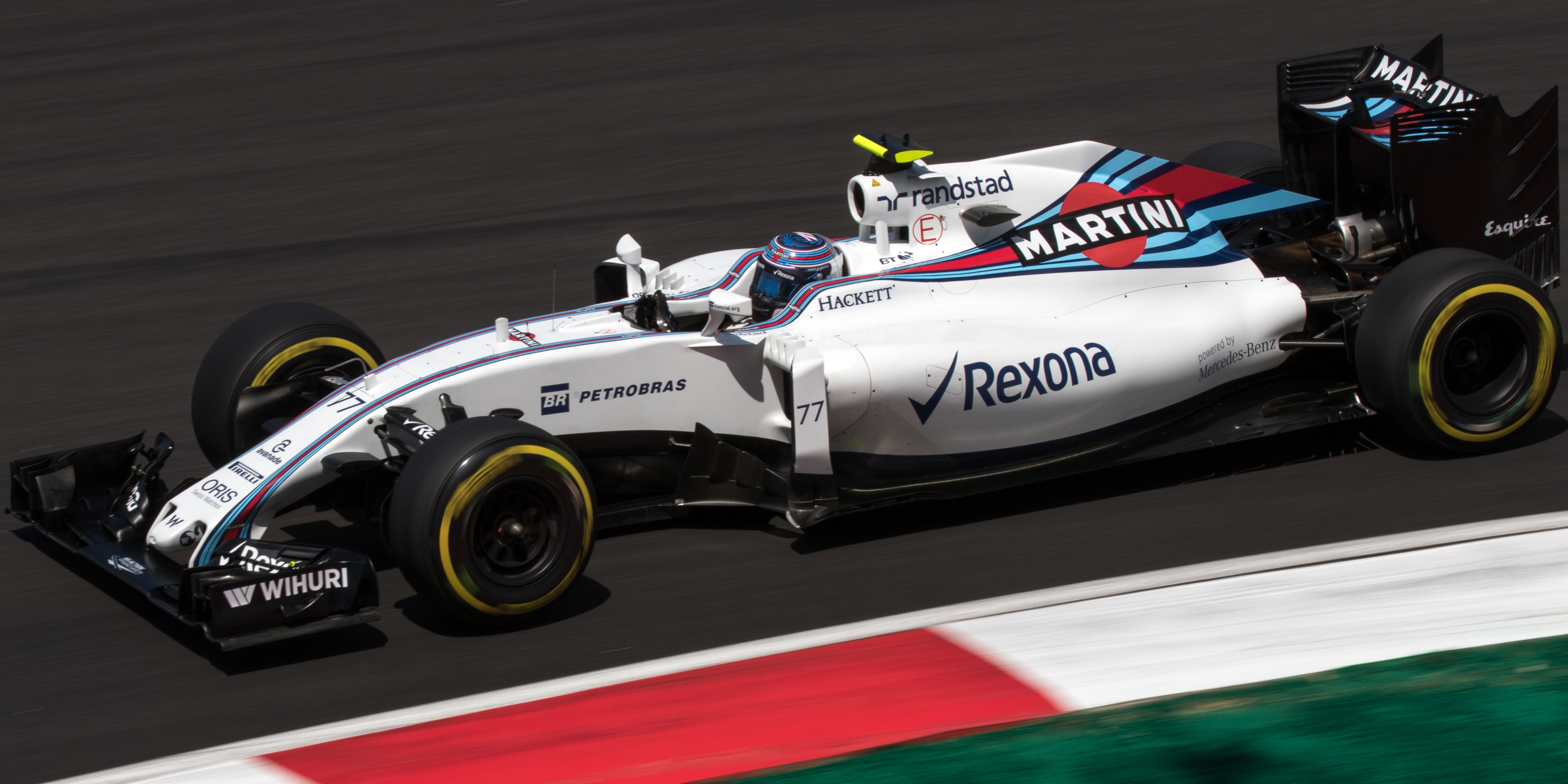
Bottas at the 2016 Malaysian Grand Prix

Bottas and Massa remained teammates at Williams for the 2016 season. A gearbox penalty required him to start the season-opening Australian Grand Prix from 16th place, but he recovered to score points in the race. He was judged to have caused a lap-one collision with Lewis Hamilton at the Bahrain Grand Prix and received a drive-through penalty; he started sixth and finished ninth. He scored more points at the following three races and achieved his best qualifying performance of the season at the Russian Grand Prix, starting third and finishing fourth. This made Bottas and Massa the only two drivers to score points in each of the first five races of the season. This streak ended at the Monaco Grand Prix, where Bottas started and finished 11th but was demoted to 12th for causing a collision with Esteban Gutiérrez. He claimed the team's only podium finish of 2016 at the Canadian Grand Prix; he qualified seventh but executed a one-stop strategy and climbed to third at the finish.

Bottas achieved an unofficial Formula One record speed of 378 km/h (235 mph) at the Baku City Circuit during qualifying for the European Grand Prix. He started sixth at the British Grand Prix but a spin dropped him outside the points. He scored points at the following four races, including sixth place at the Italian Grand Prix, but retired from the Singapore Grand Prix after picking up a puncture and encountering issues with his seatbelt and gearbox. This was followed by a drive from 11th on the grid to fifth place at the Malaysian Grand Prix. A first lap puncture caused him to fall outside the points after qualifying eighth at the United States Grand Prix, and his season ended with a suspension-related retirement at the Abu Dhabi Grand Prix.

Bottas finished the season eighth in the World Drivers' Championship, scoring 85 points to Massa's 53 and qualifying ahead of his teammate at seventeen of the twenty-one races. Williams finished fifth in the World Constructors' Championship, down from third in the previous two years.

=== Mercedes (2017–2021) ===
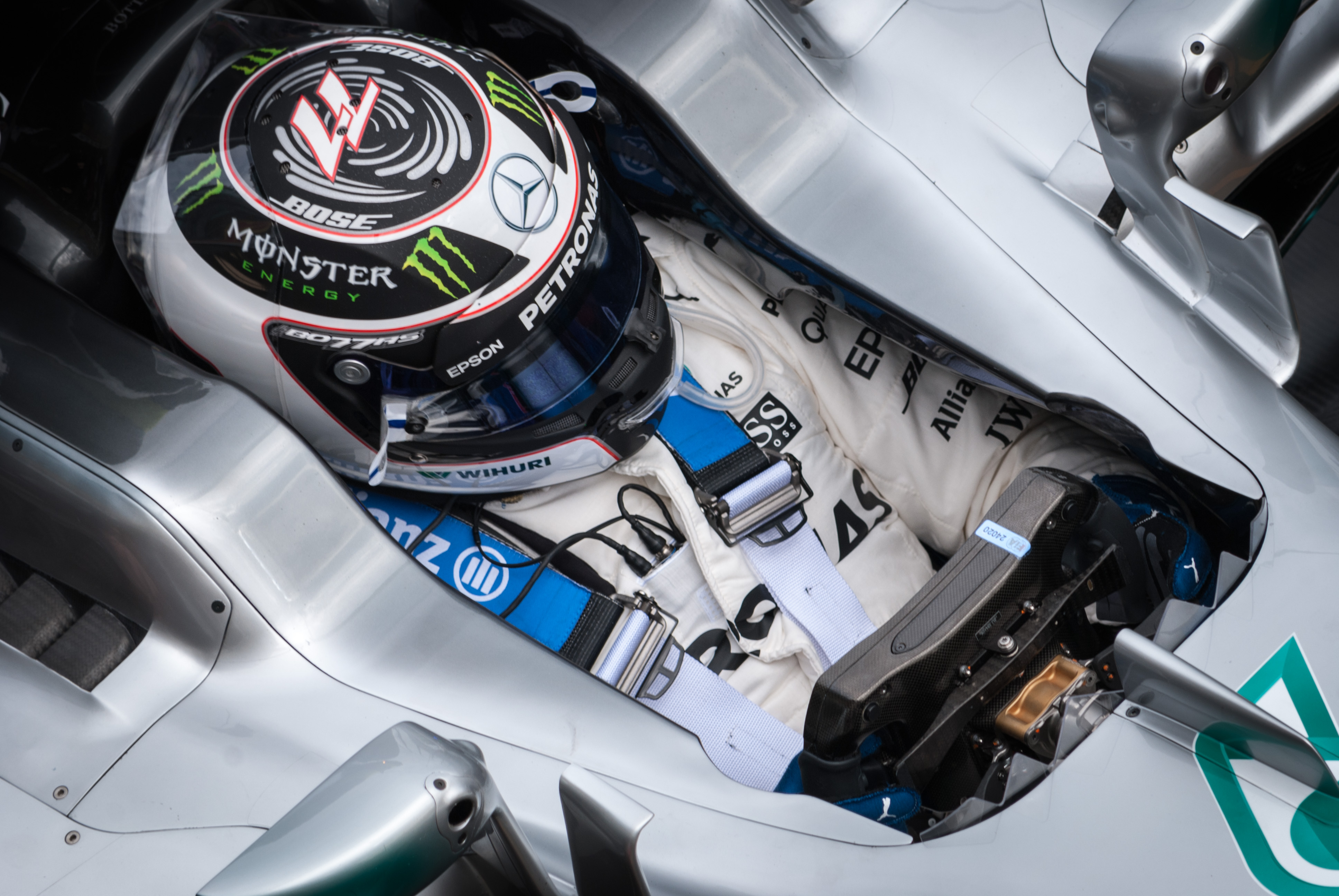
Bottas on debut for Mercedes, 2017

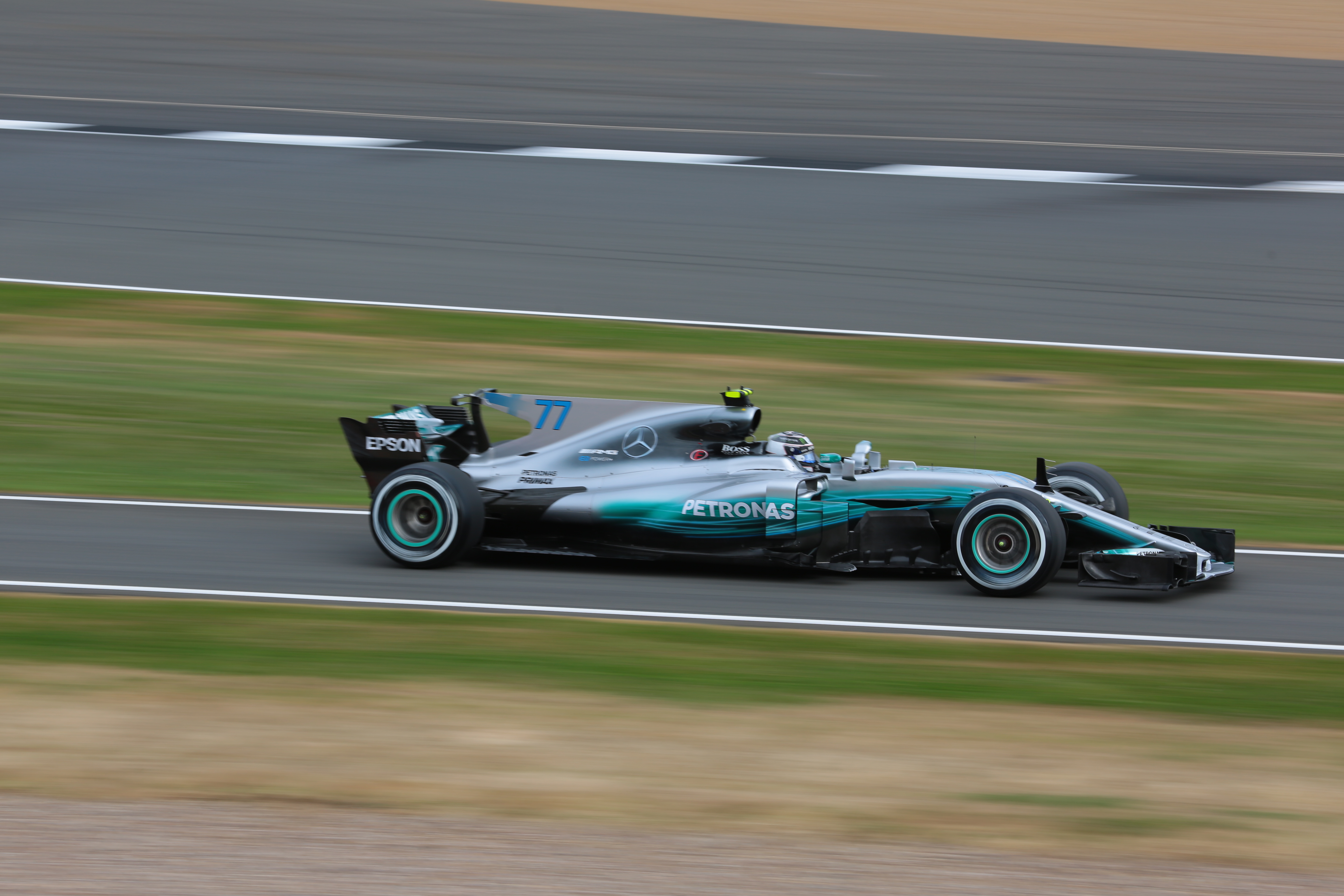
Bottas driving for Mercedes at the 2017 British Grand Prix

==== 2017: Maiden race win ====
Bottas was set to remain at Williams for a fifth year, with the team announcing a 2017 lineup of Bottas and Lance Stroll in November 2016. Following reigning champion Nico Rosberg's shock retirement from the sport, Mercedes announced in January 2017 that they had signed Bottas to partner Lewis Hamilton at the team. Williams deputy team principal Claire Williams commented that she did not want to "stand in the way" of Bottas driving for a championship-contending team.

Bottas qualified and finished third in his first race as a Mercedes driver, the Australian Grand Prix, behind Sebastian Vettel and Lewis Hamilton. At the Chinese Grand Prix, he spun behind the safety car and fell from fifth to 12th but recovered to sixth place by the finish. He qualified fastest ahead of Hamilton at the Bahrain Grand Prix, marking his first career pole position. Tyre pressure issues during the race contributed to him falling behind Vettel and Hamilton to finish third. He qualified third behind the two Ferraris of Vettel and Räikkönen at the Russian Grand Prix, but overtook both on the opening lap and went on to claim his first Grand Prix victory, making him the fifth Finnish driver to do so. He was able to continue after a first-lap collision with Räikkönen and Max Verstappen at the Spanish Grand Prix, but later retired from third place with an engine failure. He benefited from damage to Vettel's car to finish second behind Hamilton at the Canadian Grand Prix and followed this with a recovery drive at the Azerbaijan Grand Prix; a first-lap collision with Räikkönen had put him a lap behind but the red-flag period and multiple safety cars allowed him to catch up and pass Lance Stroll for second place metres before the finish line.

Bottas took pole and victory at the Austrian Grand Prix after holding off Vettel towards the end of the race, placing him only 15 points behind Hamilton in the championship. Having started the British Grand Prix ninth following a grid penalty for a new gearbox, he made his way into third place and was promoted to second behind Hamilton after a late-race tyre failure for Räikkönen's Ferrari. He gave up third place at the Hungarian Grand Prix to allow Hamilton to attack the Ferraris ahead, but an ultimately-unsuccessful Hamilton later returned the position to Bottas on the final lap. After the summer break, Bottas started third but finished fifth at the Belgian Grand Prix as he was overtaken by both Daniel Ricciardo and Räikkönen. He started fourth at the Italian Grand Prix, qualifying more than two seconds slower than pole-sitter Hamilton. He recovered to finish second.

Bottas qualified sixth at the Singapore Grand Prix and gained from strategy and the four-car collision on the first lap to finish third. He finished off the podium for the next three races while Hamilton claimed two wins and a second place, but his performances helped Mercedes clinch their fourth consecutive Constructors' Championship at the United States Grand Prix. He returned to the podium at the Mexican Grand Prix, starting fourth but benefiting from contact between Vettel and Hamilton to finish second. His third pole position of the season came at the Brazilian Grand Prix, but he again finished second after losing the lead to Vettel at the first corner. He claimed pole position again at the season-ending Abu Dhabi Grand Prix and went on to achieve his third Grand Prix victory.

Bottas finished third overall in the World Drivers' Championship with 305 points, compared to 363 for teammate and champion Hamilton, and qualified ahead of Hamilton at six of the nineteen races. He was praised for his performances early in the season, but Martin Brundle commented that he "went on the missing list after August" and Bottas described his own season as "disappointing".

==== 2018: Underwhelming season ====
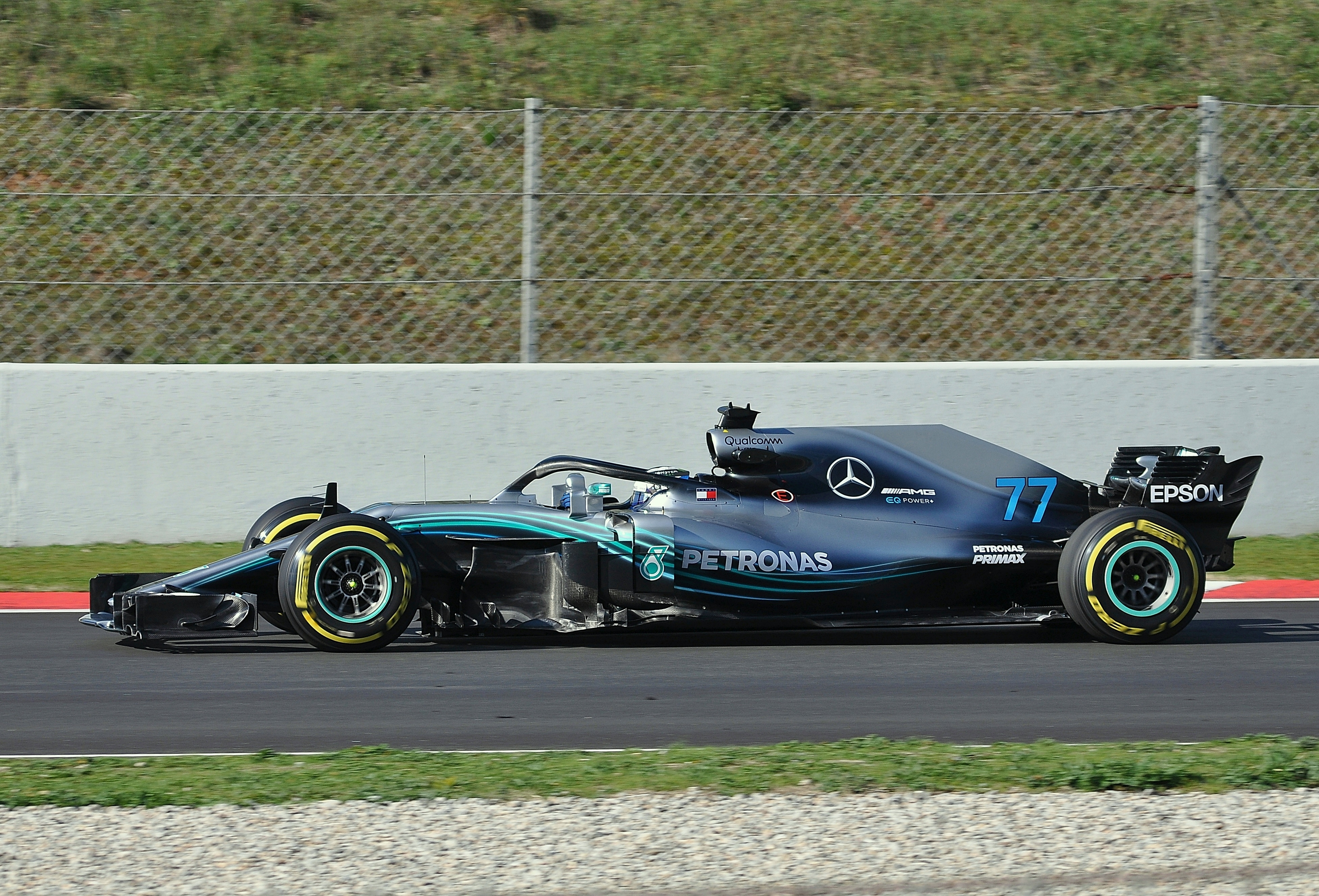
Bottas testing for Mercedes in 2018

In September 2017, Mercedes announced that Bottas would remain with the team for the 2018 season. He started 15th at the season-opening Australian Grand Prix after crashing in qualifying and taking a gearbox penalty, but recovered to score points in eighth place. He qualified third, ahead of Hamilton, at the Bahrain Grand Prix. He overtook Räikkönen at the start and finished less than a second behind race winner Vettel. He again qualified third ahead of Hamilton at the Chinese Grand Prix and overtook both Ferraris to lead the race, but was ultimately passed by Daniel Ricciardo, who used a safety car period to pit for fresh tyres. He was leading the Azerbaijan Grand Prix with two laps remaining but ran over a piece of debris, causing a puncture and forcing him into retirement. Further podiums came with second-place finishes at the Spanish and Canadian Grands Prix.

Bottas qualified second at the French Grand Prix but was hit by Vettel at the start, requiring him to pit for repairs and resulting in a seventh-place finish. Vettel accepted responsibility for the collision, and Bottas remarked that the race "sums up my season so far". He took his first pole position of the year at the Austrian Grand Prix but lost the lead to Hamilton on the first lap and then retired with a gearbox failure. He challenged Hamilton for the lead at the German Grand Prix but was ordered by Mercedes to "hold position" and finish second. He was running in second place in the closing laps of the Hungarian Grand Prix, but dropped to fifth after making contact with Vettel and Ricciardo in separate incidents. Mercedes team principal Toto Wolff praised Bottas's defence against the Ferraris and described him as a "sensational wingman". Bottas commented that the description was hurtful and that he would discuss the situation with team management. He started 17th at the Belgian Grand Prix due to a power unit components penalty but recovered to fourth place in the race.

Bottas was promoted to the podium at the Italian Grand Prix after Max Verstappen received a penalty for colliding with him. He claimed pole position at the Russian Grand Prix but was ordered by Mercedes to concede his position to Hamilton during the race. Hamilton later indicated that he was unhappy with the order, but Wolff remarked that maximising Hamilton's championship points was the "harsh reality", with Bottas commenting "Lewis is fighting for the drivers' championship and I'm not". The Japanese Grand Prix was his eighth and final podium finish of the year, and he finished fifth at each of the remaining four races.

Bottas became the first Mercedes driver to finish a season without a win since Michael Schumacher in 2012, and set a record for the most second-place finishes (seven) in a season without a win. He finished fifth overall in the World Drivers' Championship with 247 points, whilst teammate Hamilton won his fifth world title with 408 points. He described 2018 as his worst season in Formula One, and later revealed that he almost retired from the sport at the end of the season, stating "I lost the joy of F1".

==== 2019–2020: Championship runner-up ====
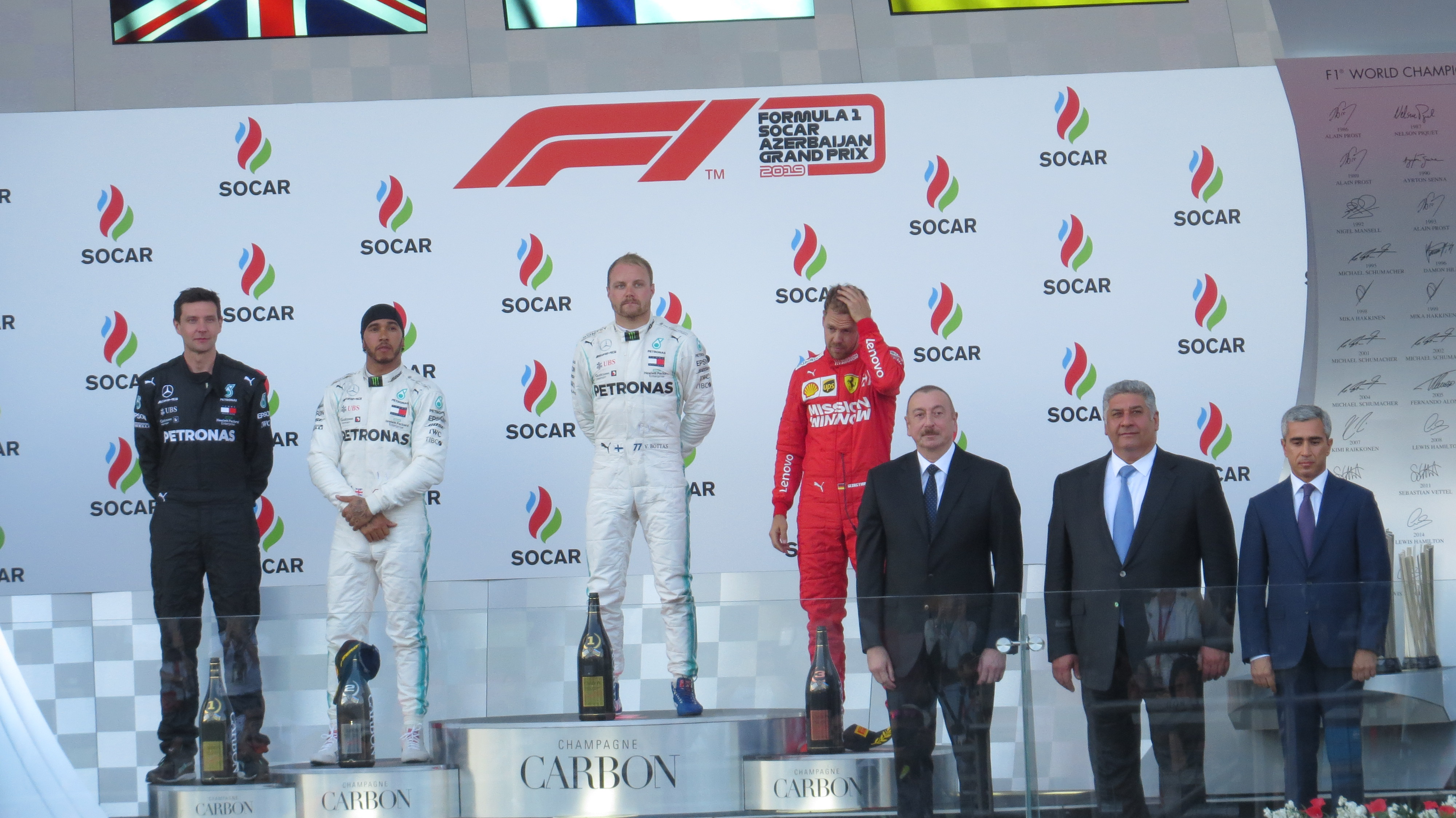
Bottas on the podium after winning the 2019 Azerbaijan Grand Prix

In July 2018, Bottas signed a contract extension with Mercedes for the 2019 season with an option for 2020, continuing alongside Hamilton. He qualified second behind Hamilton at the Australian Grand Prix but overtook Hamilton at the first corner. Bottas went on to win the race by over 20 seconds ahead of Hamilton, his fourth Grand Prix victory. After crossing the finish line, he exclaimed over the radio "to whom it may concern, fuck you", which he later explained was aimed at both himself and the critics of his 2018 performance. He finished second behind Hamilton at the Bahrain Grand Prix after race leader Charles Leclerc slowed with engine issues and dropped behind the Mercedes drivers. He took pole position at the Chinese Grand Prix but lost the position to Hamilton at the start, who led the entire race distance to win. Bottas followed this with a victory from pole at the Azerbaijan Grand Prix, promoting him to the lead of the championship by one point over Hamilton.

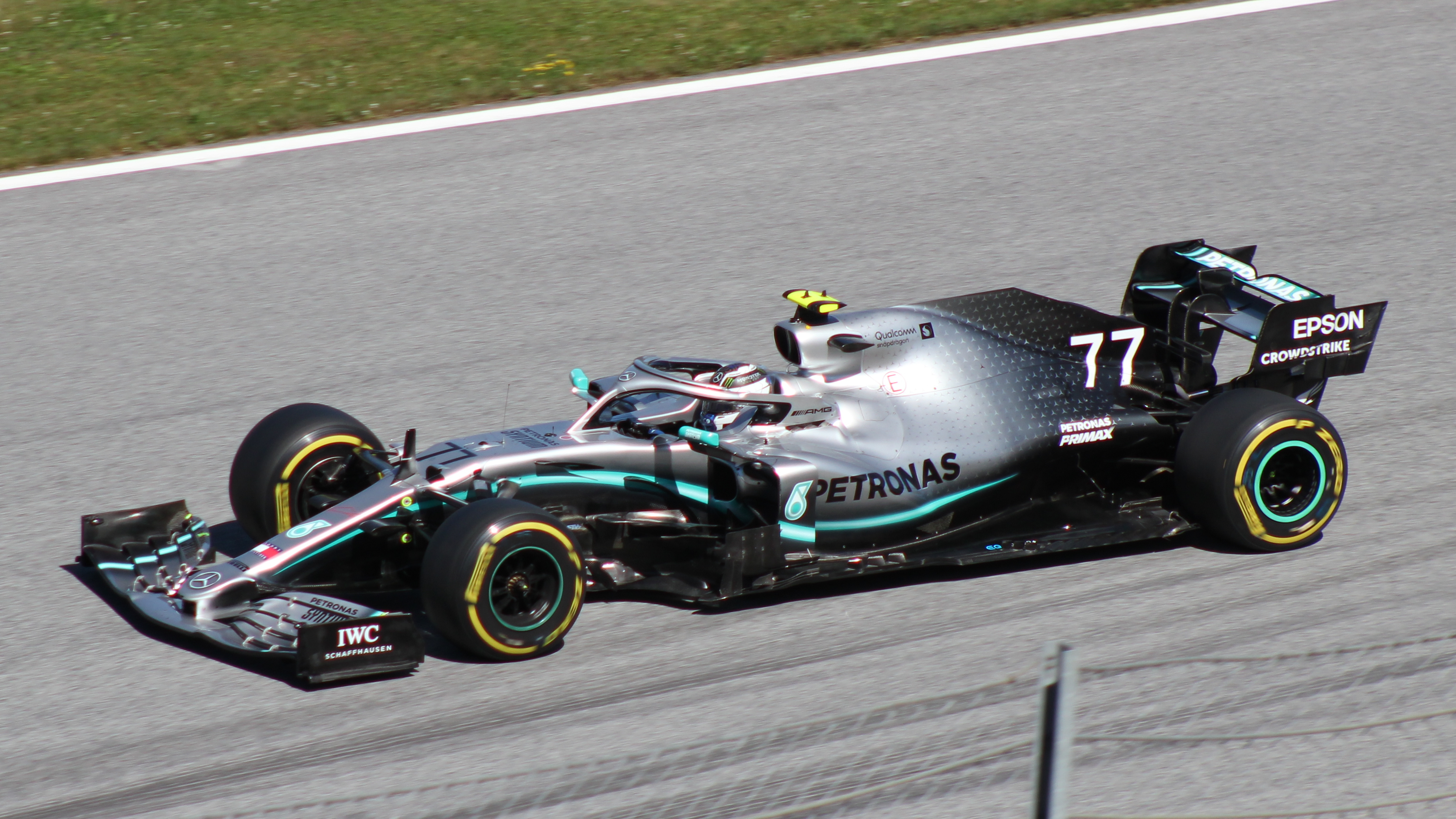
Bottas at the 2019 Austrian Grand Prix

Azerbaijan would be the final time that Bottas led the championship as Hamilton would win the next four races. Bottas took his third consecutive pole at the Spanish Grand Prix but was overtaken by Hamilton at the first corner and finished second, achieving Mercedes' fifth one-two finish in a row. He qualified second at the Monaco Grand Prix but finished third behind Sebastian Vettel after making contact with Max Verstappen in the pit lane. He qualified sixth and finished off the podium at the Canadian Grand Prix and placed second behind Hamilton at the French Grand Prix. He finished third at the Austrian Grand Prix, ahead of Hamilton for the first time since Azerbaijan, but failed to convert pole position into victory at the British Grand Prix after Hamilton took advantage of a safety car to jump ahead of Bottas in the pit stop phase. He crashed out from fourth place in the closing laps of the German Grand Prix, and front-wing damage from contact with Leclerc resulted in an eighth-place finish at the Hungarian Grand Prix whilst Hamilton claimed victory, leaving Bottas 62 points behind in the championship ahead of the summer break.

Further podiums came at the Belgian, Italian (where he finished less than a second behind winner Leclerc) and Russian Grands Prix before he claimed his sixth Formula One victory at the Japanese Grand Prix, having started the race behind both Ferraris. This result helped Mercedes clinch their sixth consecutive World Constructors' Championship. He crashed heavily in qualifying at the Mexican Grand Prix and started sixth, but recovered to third place in the race. He claimed victory from pole at the United States Grand Prix, however this was insufficient to prevent race runner-up Hamilton from mathematically securing the championship with two races remaining. Bottas retired from fifth place with an engine failure at the Brazilian Grand Prix and ended the season with a fourth-place finish at the Abu Dhabi Grand Prix after starting from the back of the grid.

Bottas finished the season in second place in the World Drivers' Championship with 326 points to Hamilton's 413. He recorded four wins, fifteen podium finishes, five pole positions and three fastest laps, making 2019 his most successful year at Mercedes. He was rated the fourth-best driver of the season in a poll of the Formula One team principals. On his season, Bottas commented "I've not been able to be at my very, very best every single race, but much more often than ever before", and praised Hamilton's consistency.

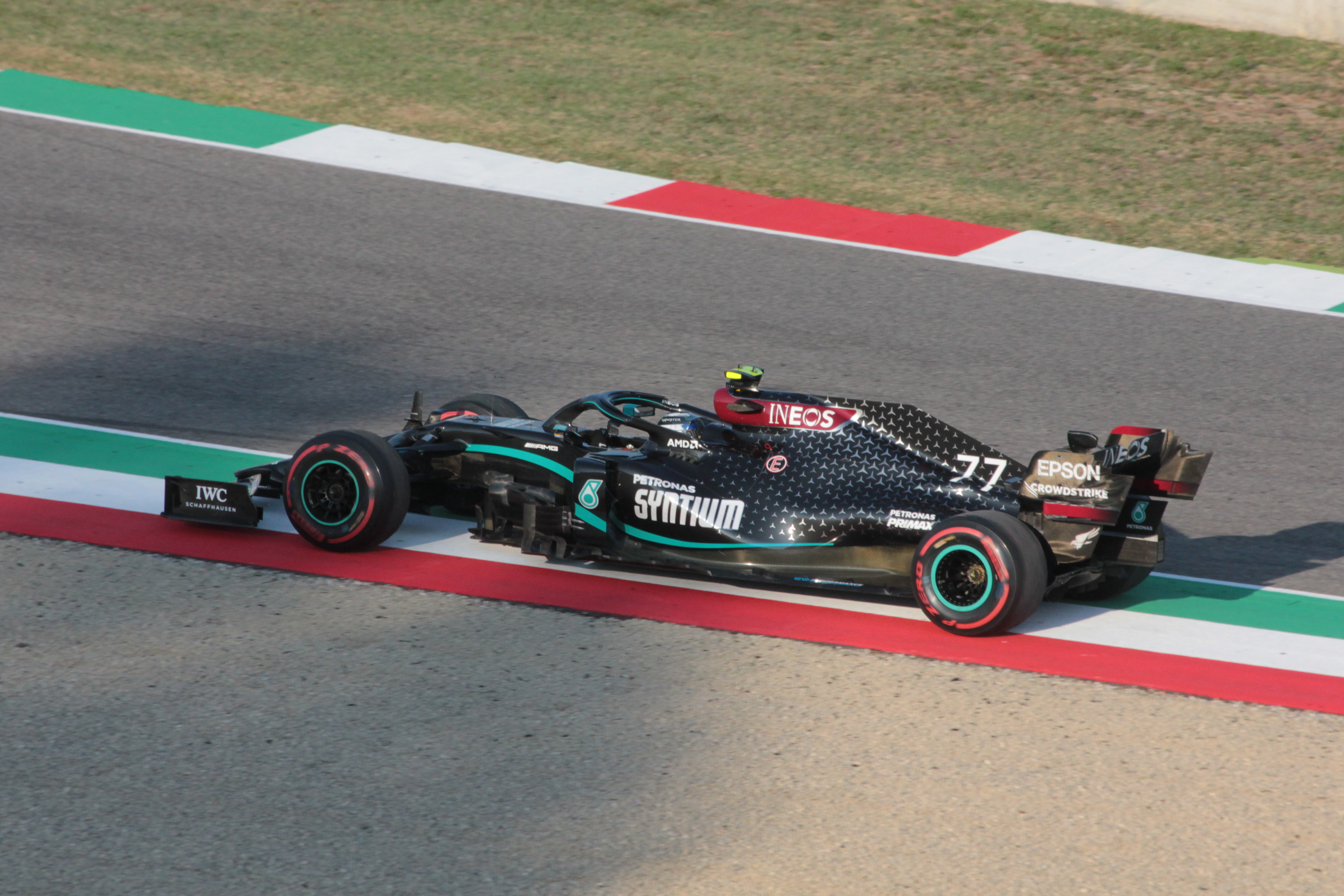
Bottas at the 2020 Tuscan Grand Prix

Bottas continued driving at Mercedes alongside Hamilton for 2020, having agreed to a one-year extension to his contract during the 2019 season. He set the fastest time in pre-season testing at the Circuit de Barcelona-Catalunya. Bottas took pole position at the season-opening Austrian Grand Prix and led the race from start to finish. Before the Styrian Grand Prix, it was revealed that Bottas was under FIA investigation for potentially breaching COVID-19 safety protocols after he returned home to Monaco, but was eventually cleared of wrongdoing. Bottas qualified fourth in wet conditions for the Styrian Grand Prix and went on to finish second in the race behind Hamilton. Bottas qualified second behind Hamilton at the Hungarian Grand Prix, but made a false start and lost four places at the first corner. He was able to recover to third place by the end of the Grand Prix but lost the lead of the championship to race-winner Hamilton. Bottas again qualified second behind Hamilton at the British Grand Prix. He ran closely behind Hamilton for most of the race but fell back in the closing laps before suffering a tyre failure with four laps remaining. He returned to the pits for a tyre change and eventually finished 11th. Bottas secured pole position at the following week's 70th Anniversary Grand Prix but dropped behind Hamilton in the race, and tyre issues for the Mercedes cars allowed Max Verstappen to pass both drivers to win. This result demoted Bottas to third place in the Drivers' Championship.

Bottas qualified second for the Spanish Grand Prix but lost positions at the start and finished third behind Verstappen, later commenting that the championship was "drifting away". He qualified and finished second at the Belgian Grand Prix, and again qualified second for the Italian Grand Prix, but dropped places in the opening laps and finished fifth. Verstappen's retirement in the race allowed him to regain second place in the Drivers' Championship, 47 points behind Hamilton. At the Tuscan Grand Prix, Bottas took the lead from pole-sitter Hamilton on the first lap. The race was red-flagged on lap seven after a multi-car accident, and Bottas lost the lead to Hamilton shortly after the restart and finished second. He qualified third behind Hamilton and Verstappen for the Russian Grand Prix, but benefited from penalties issued to Hamilton to claim the ninth Grand Prix victory of his career. Bottas took pole position for the Eifel Grand Prix but was overtaken by Hamilton after a mistake on lap 13. He later retired from third place with power loss, extending Hamilton's championship lead to 69 points. Bottas finished second at both the Portuguese and Emilia Romagna Grands Prix. He claimed pole position at the latter, but took damage from debris in the early laps and fell to third before regaining second place when Verstappen retired with a tyre failure.

Both Mercedes cars struggled for pace during the wet Turkish Grand Prix qualifying session, with Bottas qualifying ninth. The rain continued during the race and Bottas spun six times after damaging his front wing due to contact with the Renault of Esteban Ocon, finishing a lap behind race-winner Hamilton in 14th place. This gave Hamilton an unassailable 110-point lead over Bottas in the Drivers' Championship, securing Hamilton his seventh world title. At the Bahrain Grand Prix, Bottas qualified second before suffering a puncture during an early safety car period, resulting in an eighth-place finish. He was joined by George Russell at Mercedes for the Sakhir Grand Prix as Hamilton was unable to race, and took pole position ahead of Russell by 0.026 seconds. Bottas was overtaken by Russell on the opening lap. A tyre mix-up later in the race dropped both cars down the order, with Bottas being sent into and out of the pits without a tyre change. He lost positions in the closing laps to cars on fresher tyres and finished eighth. At the season-ending Abu Dhabi Grand Prix, Bottas qualified and finished second ahead of Hamilton.

Bottas ended the year second in the World Drivers' Championship with 223 points to Hamilton's 347, recording two wins, five pole positions, eleven podiums, and two fastest laps. He reflected that again finishing second to Hamilton "can't be that satisfying", but Hamilton commented that the points gap between the two was exaggerated by Bottas's misfortune.

==== 2021: Final season at Mercedes ====
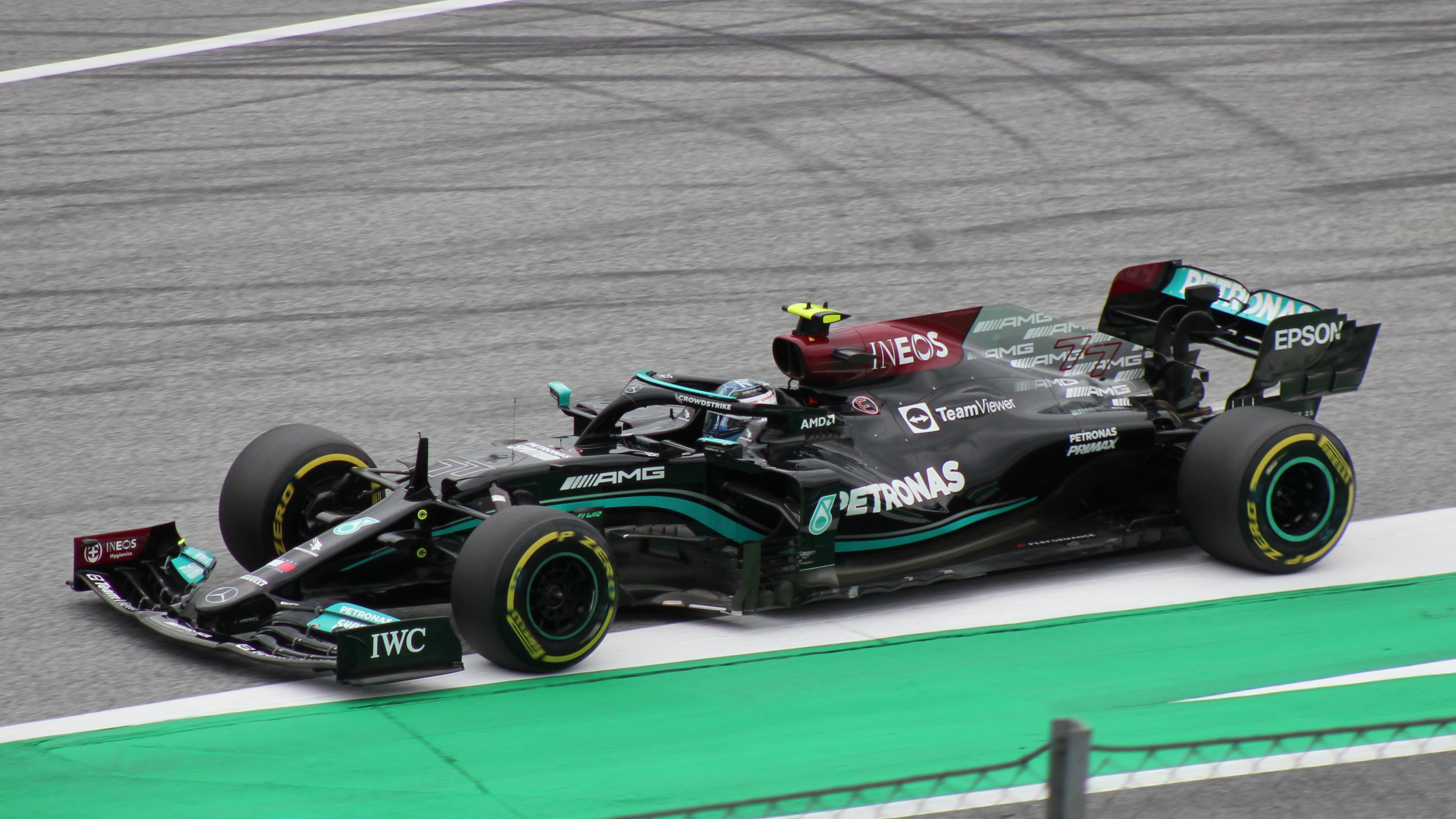
Bottas at the 2021 Austrian Grand Prix

Bottas extended his contract with Mercedes into 2021. He started and finished third at the season-opening Bahrain Grand Prix. He qualified eighth and was unable to gain ground at the Emilia Romagna Grand Prix before being involved in a high-speed collision with George Russell. Both drivers blamed each other for the incident, but Russell later apologised. At the Portuguese Grand Prix, Bottas qualified on pole position but was passed by Hamilton and Verstappen, and a sensor issue later in the race ended his pursuit of second place. He achieved another podium at the Spanish Grand Prix, qualifying and finishing third. He qualified third at the Monaco Grand Prix and was running in second place due to Charles Leclerc's failure to start. He was then forced into retirement when his team were unable to remove a wheel during his pit stop. He qualified 10th at the Azerbaijan Grand Prix; despite being disadvantaged by red flags, he had "no explanation" for his lack of pace and suspected that something was wrong with his car. He went on to finish 12th, leaving him sixth in the Drivers' Championship.

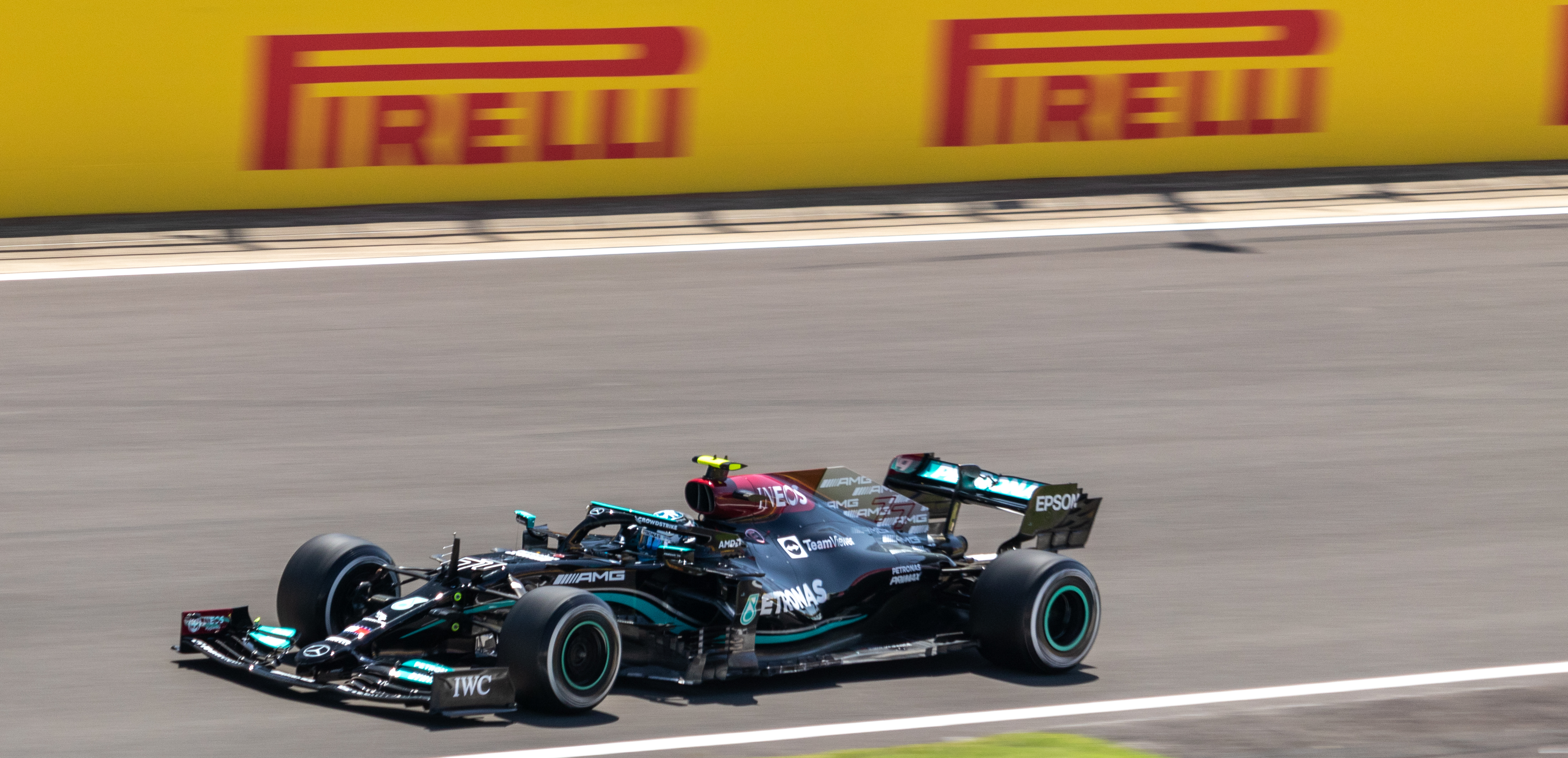
Bottas at the 2021 British Grand Prix

Bottas qualified third at the French Grand Prix, but lost the podium position to Sergio Pérez in the latter stages of the race and criticised the team's one-stop strategy after being left out on old tyres. He returned to the podium at the Styrian Grand Prix, finishing third despite a grid penalty for spinning in the pit lane during practice. He started fifth at the Austrian Grand Prix but recovered to finish second, and achieved another podium finish with third place at the British Grand Prix. He qualified second for the Hungarian Grand Prix but triggered a first-corner crash that eliminated multiple drivers from the race, for which he received a grid penalty. He regained third place in the Drivers' Championship with a podium at the Dutch Grand Prix, and followed this by setting the fastest qualifying time and winning the sprint qualifying session at the Italian Grand Prix. Power unit component changes meant he started the race from the back of the grid, but he recovered to fourth place and was promoted to the podium after Pérez received a penalty.

Bottas qualified seventh at the Russian Grand Prix but was again demoted to the back after another engine change. A well-timed pitstop for intermediate tyres on the rapidly dampening track promoted him to fifth place at the end. He qualified second at the Turkish Grand Prix but started on pole after Hamilton incurred a grid penalty. He went on to claim his first and only victory of the year by passing Charles Leclerc for the lead after pitting, a win he described as one of his best ever. Another engine penalty came at the United States Grand Prix causing him to start ninth; he gained places to finish sixth. He claimed pole position at the Mexico City Grand Prix, but a slow start and contact with Daniel Ricciardo dropped him to the back. He was later brought into the pits multiple times for soft tyres in order to deny Max Verstappen the bonus point for the fastest lap, which was successful. He qualified third at the São Paulo Grand Prix and benefited from Hamilton's disqualification and an overtake on Verstappen to win the sprint qualifying session, but ultimately dropped behind both drivers in the race. He received a grid penalty at the Qatar Grand Prix for a yellow-flag infringement and ultimately retired from the race with puncture damage, but followed this with a podium finish at the inaugural Saudi Arabian Grand Prix after passing Esteban Ocon metres before the finish line. He ended the season by qualifying and finishing sixth at the Abu Dhabi Grand Prix.

Bottas ended the season third in the World Drivers' Championship with 226 points compared to 387.5 for Hamilton, helping Mercedes to achieve an eighth consecutive World Constructors' Championship. It was announced in September that 2021 would be Bottas's final year with Mercedes, the team replacing him with George Russell. He reflected on his time at Mercedes, stating "I want to be able to say that I squeezed every drop out of this opportunity and left nothing on the table" and remarking that it had been a "privilege and a great sporting challenge" to work with Hamilton. Team principal Toto Wolff praised Bottas's contribution to the team's championship success.

=== Alfa Romeo / Sauber (2022–2024) ===
==== 2022 ====
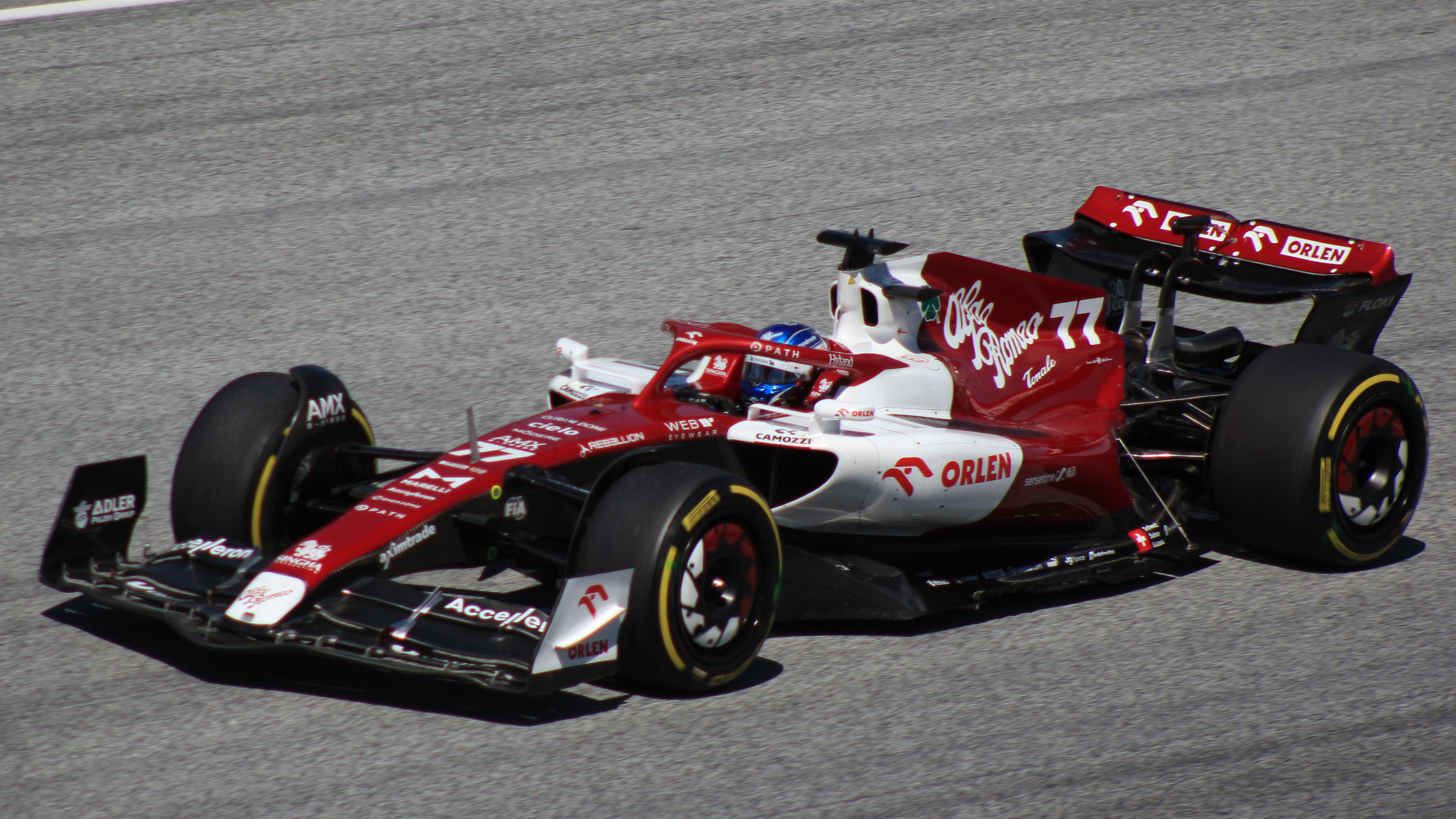
Bottas at the 2022 Austrian Grand Prix

Bottas joined Alfa Romeo for 2022 on a multi-year deal, partnering rookie driver Zhou Guanyu. He described the move as "a bit of a project" and that he felt a "responsibility to guide the team". At the season-opening Bahrain Grand Prix, he qualified and finished sixth despite a slow start that dropped him to 14th on the first lap. At the Saudi Arabian Grand Prix, he started eighth but retired his car on lap 46 due to a cooling issue. He qualified 12th at the Australian Grand Prix, ending his streak of 103 consecutive Q3 appearances, but scored points by finishing the race eighth. He set a target of a top-five finish at the Emilia Romagna Grand Prix, a result he achieved after qualifying eighth and gaining positions in the sprint and race to finish fifth despite a slow pit stop. At the Miami Grand Prix, Bottas qualified fifth despite almost no running in practice due to a crash. He held the position ahead of both Mercedes drivers until lap 50, when a mistake from Bottas allowed them to overtake. He qualified seventh at the Spanish Grand Prix and ran as high as fourth in the race, but dropped to sixth as his tyres degraded.

Bottas qualified 12th and improved to ninth in changing conditions at the Monaco Grand Prix, but finished outside the points for the first time in 2022 at the Azerbaijan Grand Prix. He was eliminated in Q2 at the Canadian Grand Prix but benefited from a late-race safety car and a penalty for Fernando Alonso to be classified seventh at the finish. A ten-race streak of failing to score points followed. Bottas retired from ninth place at the British Grand Prix with a gearbox issue, and finished 11th at the Austrian Grand Prix despite a pit-lane start. He experienced three consecutive retirements at the Hungarian, Belgian and Dutch Grands Prix, after which he identified reliability as an area of weakness for the C42 and commented that rival teams had out-developed Alfa Romeo. He started seventh at the United States Grand Prix but retired after spinning into the gravel. He returned to the points at the Mexico City Grand Prix, starting sixth and finishing tenth, followed by a ninth-place finish at the São Paulo Grand Prix despite qualifying 18th.

Bottas ended the season 10th in the World Drivers' Championship, scoring 49 points to teammate Zhou's six points and helping Alfa Romeo achieve sixth place in the World Constructors' Championship, the Hinwil-based team's best result since also finishing sixth in 2012. He described his season as "probably the most enjoyable so far", citing the security of his long-term contract and the more "relaxed" environment compared to that of Mercedes. RaceFans praised his 2022 performance, commenting that his first season at Alfa Romeo "had done far more for his reputation as a driver than his final years at Mercedes."

==== 2023 ====
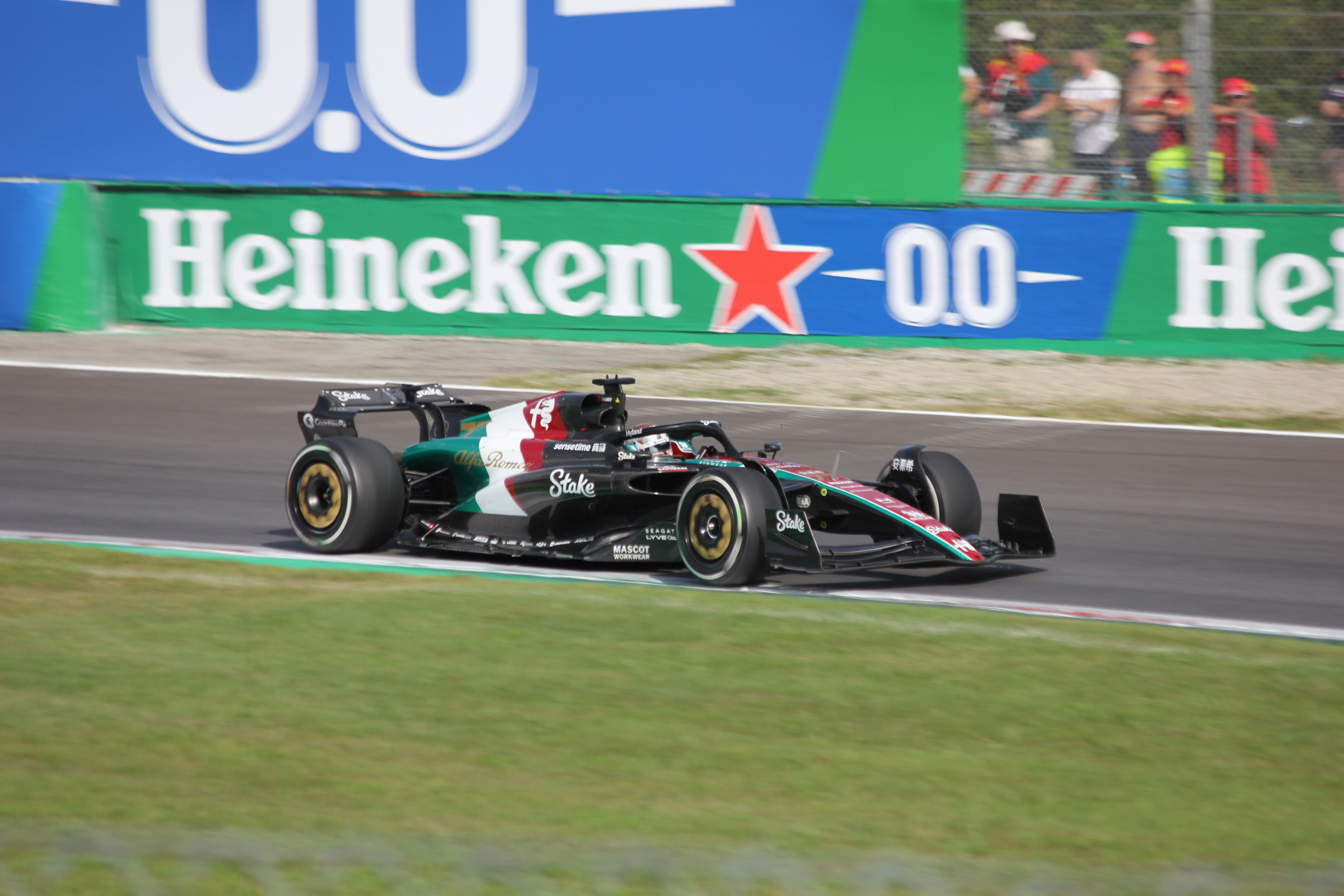
Bottas at the 2023 Italian Grand Prix

Bottas continued driving for Alfa Romeo with Zhou for 2023. He started the season by qualifying 12th and finishing eighth at the Bahrain Grand Prix. Damage from debris produced an 18th-place finish at the Saudi Arabian Grand Prix. He started from the pit lane and benefited from eight drivers' retirements at the Australian Grand Prix, but scored no points in 11th place. After another 18th-place finish at the Azerbaijan Grand Prix, Bottas commented that the C43 had improved handling compared to the C42, "but it's lacking that pure performance compared to the others". He reached Q3 at the Miami Grand Prix for the first time that year but finished outside the points. His first points since Bahrain came at the eighth round, the Canadian Grand Prix; he started 14th, finished 11th and was promoted into the top 10 by a penalty for Lando Norris. His car broke down in qualifying at the British Grand Prix and he was later disqualified from the session for an insufficient fuel sample. He recovered from 20th on the grid to 12th in the race. After the race, Bottas reflected "we're not meeting the targets we've set ourselves" with the team demoted to ninth in the Constructors' Championship.

Both Alfa Romeo drivers reached Q3 at the Hungarian Grand Prix, with Zhou and Bottas fifth and seventh respectively, but neither driver went on to score points after slow starts. Bottas's third points finish of the season came at round 14, the Italian Grand Prix, where he improved from 14th on the grid to 10th at the finish. Two consecutive retirements followed, from technical issues at the Singapore Grand Prix and from collision damage at the Japanese Grand Prix. His fourth and final points finish of 2023 came at the following Qatar Grand Prix; he qualified ninth and finished eighth, later remarking that the team "finally understand[s]" the car's upgrades. He reached Q3 again at the Mexico City Grand Prix but finished outside the points after colliding with Lance Stroll. Both Alfa Romeo drivers then retired from reliability issues at the São Paulo Grand Prix. He started seventh at the Las Vegas Grand Prix, but a lap-one collision with Sergio Pérez and Fernando Alonso left him with damage and he went on to finish 17th.

Bottas ended the season 15th in the World Drivers' Championship, scoring ten points to Zhou's six, with Alfa Romeo finishing ninth of the ten teams in the World Constructors' Championship. He qualified ahead of Zhou at 15 of the 22 races, but described the season as a "tough ride" and remarked that the team had made "steady progress but that's not enough".

==== 2024 ====
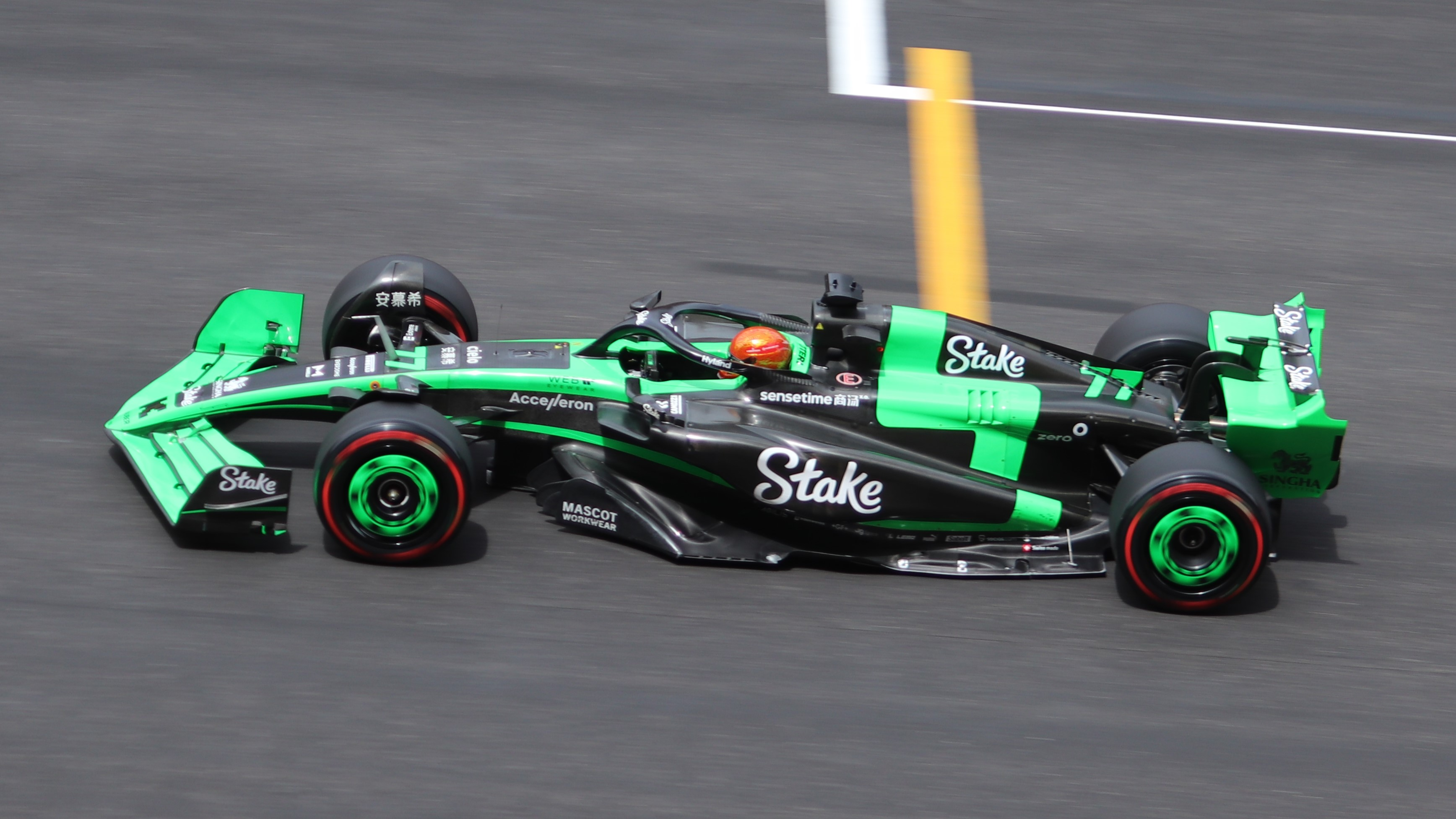
Bottas at the 2024 Chinese Grand Prix

Bottas and Zhou were retained for the 2024 season as the team rebranded to Stake F1 Team Kick Sauber after its partnership with Alfa Romeo ended. He qualified 16th at the season-opening Bahrain Grand Prix but a 52-second pit stop demoted him to 19th at the finish. Pit stop issues for Zhou at the following Saudi Arabian Grand Prix led Bottas to comment that the team's poor start to the season "needs to be a wake-up call" However, the issues continued at the Australian Grand Prix when a wheel nut problem cost Bottas 28 seconds in the pits and the team was fined €5,000 on safety grounds. He made his first Q3 appearance of 2024 at the Chinese Grand Prix, qualifying 10th, but retired from the race with an engine failure, marking his first retirement of the season.

Bottas was eliminated in Q1 at the following four races. He commented that the team "still [has] work to do" and that small upgrades for the C44 were scheduled for the Spanish Grand Prix with the hope of returning to Q2. He achieved this by qualifying 12th in Spain, however he was unable to convert the starting position into a points finish. Further Q2 appearances came at the Hungarian and Belgian Grands Prix, however this was followed by the Dutch Grand Prix, where Bottas and teammate Zhou finished 19th and 20th respectively. Bottas described the race as the team's weakest of the year and remarked that the team's issues were "long-term".

Bottas went into the season without a contract for 2025, but revealed early in the year that he had begun talks with Audi ahead of their takeover of the Sauber team. In April it was announced that the team had signed Nico Hülkenberg for 2025, after which Bottas commented that he was "confident" of finding a seat, but that he could not afford to wait too long for Audi to decide on a second driver with his options narrowing at other teams. The second seat was ultimately taken by Formula 2 graduate Gabriel Bortoleto. Sauber's performance improved in the final races of the year; Bottas qualified 11th at the São Paulo Grand Prix, finished 11th at the Qatar Grand Prix with teammate Zhou scoring the team's only points of the season in eighth place, and reached Q3 at the Abu Dhabi Grand Prix, but went on to retire with collision damage. Bottas described the improvements as "ironic" given his imminent departure from the team.

Bottas ended the season 22nd in the World Drivers' Championship, last of the full-time drivers, and failed to score points over a season for the first time in his career. Reflecting on his three-year tenure at the team, he described his move there in 2022 as a "mistake" and that it was "downhill" after the first year. He also revealed that his decision to join the team was influenced by the presence of team principal Frédéric Vasseur and that he considered exercising an option to leave the team when Vasseur moved to Ferrari, but was convinced to stay after being told he would be a "pillar" of the Audi project.

=== Mercedes reserve driver (2025) ===
In December 2024, it was announced that Bottas would be re-joining Mercedes as a reserve driver for 2025. He described the move as "like coming back home" and stated his goal was to return to a full-time seat in 2026. He revealed that he was offered a seat in the IndyCar Series, but chose to reject the offer due to his concerns about struggling to adapt to a new category after twelve years in Formula One. In March, he undertook a private test in the McLaren MCL60 as part of a reserve driver sharing arrangement between Mercedes and McLaren.

=== Cadillac (2026–present) ===
==== 2026 ====
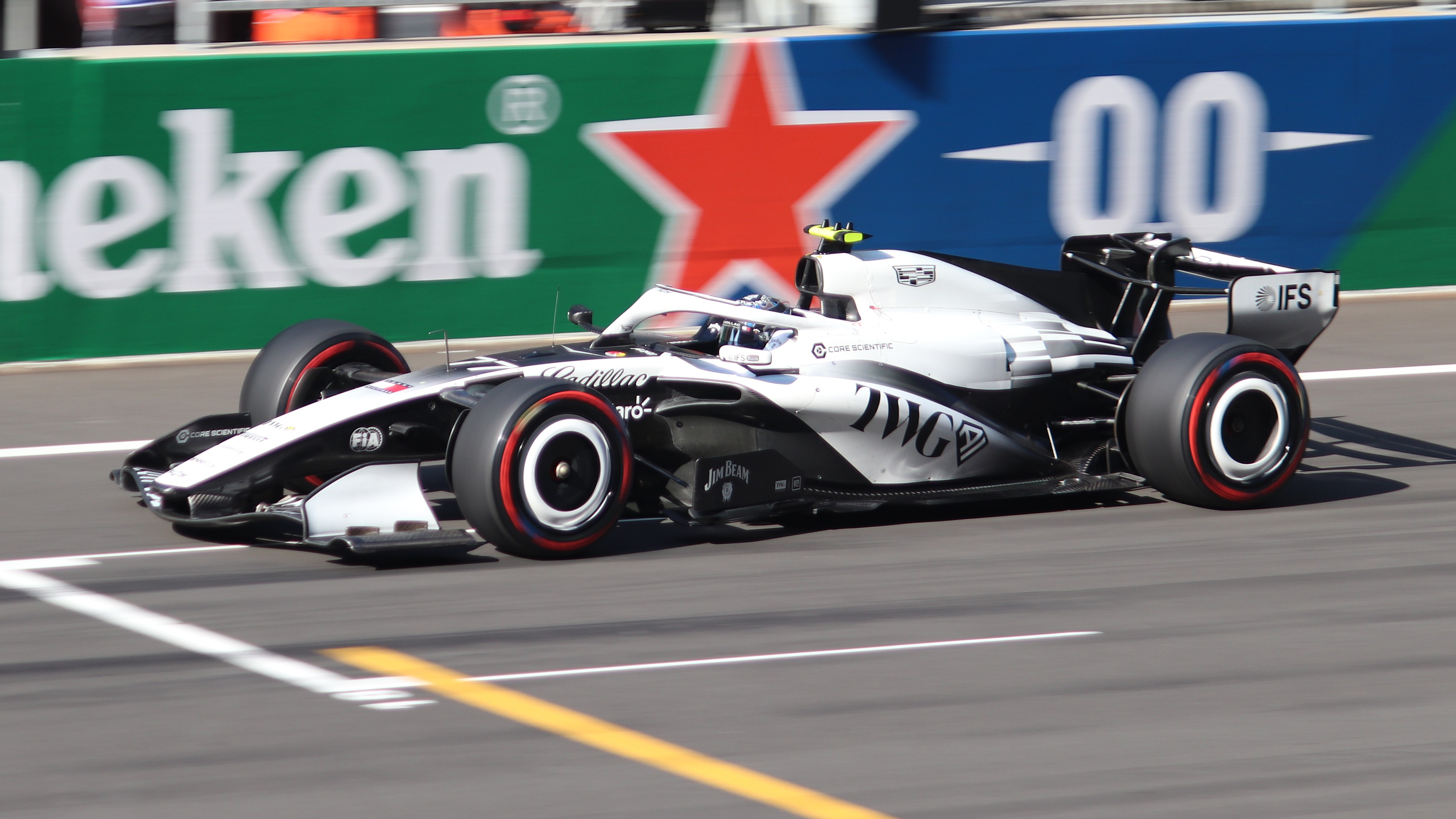
Bottas at 2026 Chinese Grand Prix

In August 2025, Cadillac announced that Bottas had signed for their debut 2026 campaign alongside six-time Grand Prix winner Sergio Pérez; he described being part of a new project as "incredibly special" and thanked Mercedes for facilitating the move. In Cadillac's first race, the Australian Grand Prix, Bottas qualified 19th and last of the drivers who set a time. He retired from the race with a mechanical issue. He later continued to finish 13th and 19th in Chinese and Japanese Grand Prix respectively whereas he finished 18th in the Miami Grand Prix. During the European leg of the season, Bottas did not finish at three races. He retired from the Monaco Grand Prix due to brake issues, retired during the seventeenth lap at Barcelona due to an overheating issue, and retired during the second lap of the Austrian Grand Prix when his brakes caught fire. He retired again from the Hungarian Grand Prix due to brake-related issues, while a hydraulic problem affecting the rear wing caused retirement from the Dutch Grand Prix.

==== 2027 ====
On 18 November 2026, amidst growing rumours that test driver Colton Herta could replace Bottas after just one year with the team, Cadillac confirmed they would be keeping Bottas for the 2027 season.

== Other racing ==
=== Rallying ===
In January 2019, Bottas took part in the Arctic Rally, recording a stage win and finishing fifth overall. In December 2019, he won the Paul Ricard-based Rallycircuit Côte d'Azur. In 2020, Bottas again participated in the Arctic Lapland Rally, where he drove a Citroën DS3 WRC car and finished ninth. He later partook in an Extreme E test in October 2020, alongside Jean-Éric Vergne and Sébastien Loeb. In January 2021, Bottas competed in his third Arctic Lapland Rally. He scored a class podium and finished sixth overall.

=== Race of Champions ===
Bottas was set to make his Race of Champions debut in 2022, partnering two-time Formula One champion Mika Häkkinen. However, he dropped out of the event last minute. Bottas then competed at the 2023 edition of the event alongside Häkkinen. Representing Finland in the Nations Cup tournament, Bottas and Häkkinen were knocked out by the Team eROC pair of Jarno Opmeer and Lucas Blakeley, having drawn 2–2 in the races but losing on a countback of total lap times. In the Champion of Champions tournament, Bottas was knocked out by Tom Kristensen.

== Other ventures ==
=== Business ===
In March 2021, Bottas became a co-owner of ice hockey team Lahti Pelicans of Finland's Liiga when he bought a 10 percent stake in the team. Bottas co-owns coffee roastery Kahiwa Coffee Roasters in Lahti, Finland. In April 2022, Bottas, in partnership with girlfriend Cromwell, launched Oath, a premium gin "embodying our family heritages from Australia and Finland".

In 2023, ahead of that year's Australian Grand Prix, Bottas announced a collaboration with Melbourne-based coffeehouse chain ST. ALi, and worked a shift as a barista at a location.

=== Gravel cycling ===
Bottas is a co-founder and partner of FNLD GRVL, a gravel cycling event in Lahti, Finland, which he organises alongside his girlfriend Tiffany Cromwell and American cyclist Amy Charity of SBT GRVL. In 2024, Bottas raced in the men's 35–39 age category race at the UCI Gravel World Championships in Flemish Brabant, Belgium. He finished in 134th place out of 233 entries. He had qualified for the World Championships after finishing sixth out of 24 entries in his age group at the Swartberg 100 gravel race in South Africa in April.

=== Philanthropy ===
In 2017, Bottas launched the Valtteri Bottas Duathlon, an annual sporting event held in Finland, which raises money for charity. In May 2022, in collaboration with German photographer Paul Ripke, more than 5,000 print copies were sold of a photo taken by Cromwell of Bottas naked in an Aspen, Colorado stream, raising more than €50,000 for charity. Bottas again worked with Ripke in 2023 to create a nude calendar, titled BOTTASS 2024, which raised $150,000 for men's health organisation Movember. During September 2026, in recognition of World Rhino Day, Bottas launched a nude, signed limited edition postcard, of which the funds raised from sales would go directly to Care for Wild Rhino sanctuary. Each purchase would also grant an entry to win Bottas' custom special edition rhino-themed helmet worn during the 2026 Azerbaijan Grand Prix.

== Personal life ==
On 11 September 2016, Bottas married his long-time girlfriend, Emilia Pikkarainen, a fellow Finn and an Olympic swimmer whom he had been dating since 2010. The couple were married at St. John's Church in Helsinki. On 28 November 2019, Bottas announced their separation and divorce, citing the "challenges my career and life situation bring". Since February 2020, Bottas has been in a relationship with Australian cyclist Tiffany Cromwell. Bottas has residences in McLaren Vale, South Australia and Monaco, and also has a lake house in his native Finland.

== Awards and honours ==
=== Formula One ===
- Formula One World Drivers' Championship runner-up: 2019, 2020
- DHL Fastest Lap Award: 2018
- Lorenzo Bandini Trophy: 2018

=== Other awards ===
- Sky Sports Award for Most Improved Driver: 2014
- Confartigianato Motori Driver of the Year: 2017
- AKK-Motorsport Driver of the Year: 2019

== Karting record ==
=== Karting career summary ===
| Season | Series | Team | Position |
|---|---|---|---|
| 2001 | Finnish Cup — Raket | | 11th |
| 2002 | Finnish Championship — ICA Junior | | 5th |
| 2003 | Finnish Championship — ICA Junior | | 4th |
| 2004 | European Championship – Northern Region Qualification — ICA Junior | Kohtala Sports | 1st |
| 2004 | Viking Trophy — ICA Junior | Kohtala Sports | 2nd |
| 2004 | Finnish Championship — ICA Junior | | 1st |
| 2005 | Finnish Championship — ICA | Kohtala Sports | 3rd |
| 2005 | Finnish Championship — Formula A | Kohtala Sports | 5th |
| 2005 | Nordic Championship — ICA | Kohtala Sports | 9th |
| 2005 | Viking Trophy — ICA | Kohtala Sports | 1st |
| 2005 | World Championship — Formula A | PDB Racing Team | 8th |
| 2006 | Finnish Championship — ICA | | 1st |
| 2006 | Finnish Championship — Formula A | Kohtala Sports | 1st |
| 2006 | NEZ Championship — ICA | | 2nd |
| 2006 | European Championship — Formula A | PDB Racing Team | 29th |
| 2006 | WSK International Series — Formula A | PDB Racing Team | 1st |
| 2006 | World Championship — Formula A | PDB Racing Team | DNF |

== Racing record ==
=== Racing career summary ===
| Season | Series | Team | Races | Wins | Poles | F/Laps | Podiums | Points | Position |
|---|---|---|---|---|---|---|---|---|---|
| 2007 | Formula Renault 2.0 NEC | Koiranen Bros. Motorsport | 16 | 2 | 2 | 3 | 6 | 279 | **3rd** |
| 2007 | Formula Renault UK Winter Series | AKA Cobra | 4 | 3 | 0 | 1 | 4 | —N/a | NC† |
| 2008 | Eurocup Formula Renault 2.0 | Motopark Academy | 14 | 5 | 7 | 4 | 10 | 139 | **1st** |
| 2008 | Formula Renault 2.0 NEC | Motopark Academy | 14 | 12 | 13 | 12 | 12 | 365 | **1st** |
| 2009 | Formula 3 Euro Series | ART Grand Prix | 20 | 0 | 2 | 1 | 6 | 62 | **3rd** |
| 2009 | British Formula 3 Championship | ART Grand Prix | 4 | 0 | 0 | 0 | 1 | —N/a | NC† |
| 2009 | Masters of Formula 3 | ART Grand Prix | 1 | 1 | 1 | 1 | 1 | —N/a | **1st** |
| 2009 | Macau Grand Prix | ART Grand Prix | 1 | 0 | 0 | 0 | 0 | —N/a | 5th |
| 2010 | Formula 3 Euro Series | ART Grand Prix | 18 | 2 | 1 | 4 | 8 | 74 | **3rd** |
| 2010 | Masters of Formula 3 | ART Grand Prix | 1 | 1 | 0 | 0 | 1 | —N/a | **1st** |
| 2010 | Macau Grand Prix | Prema Powerteam | 1 | 0 | 0 | 0 | 1 | —N/a | **3rd** |
| 2010 | Formula One | AT&T Williams | Test driver | | | | | | |
| 2011 | GP3 Series | Lotus ART | 16 | 4 | 1 | 3 | 7 | 62 | **1st** |
| 2011 | British Formula 3 Championship | Double R | 3 | 1 | 0 | 1 | 1 | 17 | 17th |
| 2011 | Macau Grand Prix | Double R | 1 | 0 | 0 | 0 | 0 | —N/a | NC |
| 2011 | Formula One | AT&T Williams | Test driver | | | | | | |
| 2012 | Formula One | Williams F1 Team | Reserve driver | | | | | | |
| 2013 | Formula One | Williams F1 Team | 19 | 0 | 0 | 0 | 0 | 4 | 17th |
| 2014 | Formula One | Williams Martini Racing | 19 | 0 | 0 | 1 | 6 | 186 | 4th |
| 2015 | Formula One | Williams Martini Racing | 19 | 0 | 0 | 0 | 2 | 136 | 5th |
| 2016 | Formula One | Williams Martini Racing | 21 | 0 | 0 | 0 | 1 | 85 | 8th |
| 2017 | Formula One | Mercedes-AMG Petronas Motorsport | 20 | 3 | 4 | 2 | 13 | 305 | **3rd** |
| 2018 | Formula One | Mercedes-AMG Petronas Motorsport | 21 | 0 | 2 | 7 | 8 | 247 | 5th |
| 2019 | Formula One | Mercedes-AMG Petronas Motorsport | 21 | 4 | 5 | 3 | 15 | 326 | **2nd** |
| 2020 | Formula One | Mercedes-AMG Petronas F1 Team | 17 | 2 | 5 | 2 | 11 | 223 | **2nd** |
| 2021 | Formula One | Mercedes-AMG Petronas F1 Team | 22 | 1 | 4 | 4 | 11 | 226 | **3rd** |
| 2022 | Formula One | Alfa Romeo F1 Team Orlen | 22 | 0 | 0 | 0 | 0 | 49 | 10th |
| 2023 | Formula One | Alfa Romeo F1 Team Stake | 22 | 0 | 0 | 0 | 0 | 10 | 15th |
| 2024 | Formula One | Stake F1 Team Kick Sauber | 24 | 0 | 0 | 0 | 0 | 0 | 22nd |
| 2025 | Formula One | Mercedes-AMG Petronas F1 Team | Reserve driver | | | | | | |
| 2025 | Formula One | McLaren F1 Team | Test driver | | | | | | |
| 2025 | Formula One | Atlassian Williams Racing | Test driver | | | | | | |
| 2026 | Formula One | Cadillac F1 Team | 21 | 0 | 0 | 0 | 0 | 0* | 23rd* |

^{†} As Bottas was a guest driver, he was ineligible for points.
* Season still in progress.

=== Complete Formula Renault 2.0 NEC results ===
(key) (Races in bold indicate pole position; races in italics indicate fastest lap.)

| Year | Entrant | 1 | 2 | 3 | 4 | 5 | 6 | 7 | 8 | 9 | 10 | 11 | 12 | 13 | 14 | 15 | 16 | DC | Points |
|---|---|---|---|---|---|---|---|---|---|---|---|---|---|---|---|---|---|---|---|
| 2007 | Koiranen Bros. Motorsport | ZAN; 1; 4 | ZAN; 2; 2 | OSC; 1; 5 | OSC; 2; 3 | **ASS**; **1**; 2 | ASS; 2; 4 | ZOL; 1; 5 | ZOL; 1; 5 | NUR; 1; 6 | NUR; 2; 6 | OSC; 1 Ret | OSC; 2; 3 | SPA; 1; 5 | SPA; 2; 12 | HOC; 1; 1 | **HOC**; **2**; 1 | 3rd | 279 |
| 2008 | Motopark Academy | **HOC**; **1**; 1 | **HOC**; **2**; 1 | **ZAN**; **1**; 1 | **ZAN**; **2**; 1 | **ALA**; **1**; 1 | **ALA**; **2**; 1 | OSC; 1 | OSC; 2 | **ASS**; **1**; 1 | **ASS**; **2**; 1 | **ZOL**; **1** Ret | **ZOL**; **2**; 16† | **NÜR**; **1**; 1 | **NÜR**; **2**; 1 | SPA; 1; 1 | **SPA**; **2**; 1 | 1st | 365 |

=== Complete Eurocup Formula Renault 2.0 results ===
(key) (Races in bold indicate pole position; races in italics indicate fastest lap.)

| Year | Entrant | 1 | 2 | 3 | 4 | 5 | 6 | 7 | 8 | 9 | 10 | 11 | 12 | 13 | 14 | DC | Points |
|---|---|---|---|---|---|---|---|---|---|---|---|---|---|---|---|---|---|
| 2008 | Motopark Academy | **SPA**; **1**; 3 | **SPA**; **2**; 27 | **SIL**; **1**; 1 | **SIL**; **2**; 2 | HUN; 1 Ret | HUN; 2; 13 | NÜR; 1; 2 | **NÜR**; **2**; 1 | LMS; 1; 3 | **LMS**; **2**; 1 | EST; 1; 3 | **EST**; **2**; 1 | CAT; 1; 1 | CAT; 2; 4 | 1st | 139 |

=== Complete Formula 3 Euro Series results ===
(key) (Races in bold indicate pole position; races in italics indicate fastest lap.)

| Year | Entrant | Chassis | Engine | 1 | 2 | 3 | 4 | 5 | 6 | 7 | 8 | 9 | 10 | 11 | 12 | 13 | 14 | 15 | 16 | 17 | 18 | 19 | 20 | DC | Points |
|---|---|---|---|---|---|---|---|---|---|---|---|---|---|---|---|---|---|---|---|---|---|---|---|---|---|
| 2009 | ART Grand Prix | Dallara F308/009 | Mercedes | HOC; 1 Ret | HOC; 2; 16 | **LAU**; **1**; 2 | LAU; 2; 13 | NOR; 1; 12 | NOR; 2 Ret | ZAN; 1; 2 | ZAN; 2; 6 | OSC; 1; 2 | OSC; 2; 8 | NÜR; 1; 2 | NÜR; 2; 4 | **BRH**; **1**; 2 | BRH; 2; 15 | CAT; 1; 4 | CAT; 2; 6 | DIJ; 1; 16 | DIJ; 2 Ret | HOC; 1; 2 | HOC; 2; 5 | **3rd** | **62** |
| 2010 | ART Grand Prix | Dallara F308/026 | Mercedes | LEC; 1; 9 | LEC; 2; 6 | HOC; 1; 3 | HOC; 2; 5 | VAL; 1; 2 | VAL; 2; 4 | NOR; 1; 3 | NOR; 2; 1 | NÜR; 1; 6 | NÜR; 2; 7 | ZAN; 1; 2 | ZAN; 2 Ret | BRH; 1; 4 | BRH; 2; 4 | **OSC**; **1**; 1 | OSC; 2; 11† | HOC; 1; 2 | HOC; 2; 3 | | | **3rd** | **74** |

^{†} Driver did not finish the race but was classified as he completed over 90% of the race distance.

=== Complete GP3 Series results ===
(key) (Races in bold indicate pole position; races in italics indicate fastest lap.)

| Year | Entrant | 1 | 2 | 3 | 4 | 5 | 6 | 7 | 8 | 9 | 10 | 11 | 12 | 13 | 14 | 15 | 16 | Pos | Points |
|---|---|---|---|---|---|---|---|---|---|---|---|---|---|---|---|---|---|---|---|
| 2011 | Lotus ART | IST; FEA; 4 | IST; SPR; 8 | CAT; FEA; 10 | CAT; SPR; 7 | VAL; FEA; 7 | VAL; SPR; 3 | SIL; FEA; 15 | SIL; SPR; 12 | NÜR; FEA; 3 | NÜR; SPR; 1 | **HUN**; **FEA**; 1 | HUN; SPR; 2 | SPA; FEA; 1 | SPA; SPR; 19 | MNZ; FEA; 1 | MNZ; SPR; 17 | **1st** | **62** |

=== Complete Formula One results ===
(key) (Races in bold indicate pole position; races in italics indicates fastest lap.)

| Year | Entrant | Chassis | Engine | 1 | 2 | 3 | 4 | 5 | 6 | 7 | 8 | 9 | 10 | 11 | 12 | 13 | 14 | 15 | 16 | 17 | 18 | 19 | 20 | 21 | 22 | 23 | 24 | WDC | Points |
|---|---|---|---|---|---|---|---|---|---|---|---|---|---|---|---|---|---|---|---|---|---|---|---|---|---|---|---|---|---|
| 2012 | Williams F1 Team | Williams FW34 | Renault RS27-2012 2.4 V8 | AUS | MAL; TD | CHN; TD | BHR; TD | ESP; TD | MON | CAN | EUR; TD | GBR; TD | GER; TD | HUN; TD | BEL; TD | ITA; TD | SIN | JPN; TD | KOR; TD | IND; TD | ABU; TD | USA | BRA; TD | | | | | – | – |
| 2013 | Williams F1 Team | Williams FW35 | Renault RS27-2013 2.4 V8 | AUS; 14 | MAL; 11 | CHN; 13 | BHR; 14 | ESP; 16 | MON; 12 | CAN; 14 | GBR; 12 | GER; 16 | HUN; Ret | BEL; 15 | ITA; 15 | SIN; 13 | KOR; 12 | JPN; 17 | IND; 16 | ABU; 15 | USA; 8 | BRA; Ret | | | | | | 17th | 4 |
| 2014 | Williams Martini Racing | Williams FW36 | Mercedes PU106A Hybrid 1.6 V6 t | AUS; 5 | MAL; 8 | BHR; 8 | CHN; 7 | ESP; 5 | MON; Ret | CAN; 7 | AUT; 3 | GBR; 2 | GER; 2 | HUN; 8 | BEL; 3 | ITA; 4 | SIN; 11 | JPN; 6 | RUS; 3 | USA; 5 | BRA; 10 | ABU; 3 | | | | | | 4th | 186 |
| 2015 | Williams Martini Racing | Williams FW37 | Mercedes PU106B Hybrid 1.6 V6 t | AUS; DNS | MAL; 5 | CHN; 6 | BHR; 4 | ESP; 4 | MON; 14 | CAN; 3 | AUT; 5 | GBR; 5 | HUN; 13 | BEL; 9 | ITA; 4 | SIN; 5 | JPN; 5 | RUS; 12^{†} | USA; Ret | MEX; 3 | BRA; 5 | ABU; 13 | | | | | | 5th | 136 |
| 2016 | Williams Martini Racing | Williams FW38 | Mercedes PU106C Hybrid 1.6 V6 t | AUS; 8 | BHR; 9 | CHN; 10 | RUS; 4 | ESP; 5 | MON; 12 | CAN; 3 | EUR; 6 | AUT; 9 | GBR; 14 | HUN; 9 | GER; 9 | BEL; 8 | ITA; 6 | SIN; Ret | MAL; 5 | JPN; 10 | USA; 16 | MEX; 8 | BRA; 11 | ABU; Ret | | | | 8th | 85 |
| 2017 | Mercedes-AMG Petronas Motorsport | Mercedes AMG W08 | Mercedes M08 EQ Power+ 1.6 V6 t | AUS; 3 | CHN; 6 | **BHR**; 3 | RUS; 1 | ESP; Ret | MON; 4 | CAN; 2 | AZE; 2 | **AUT**; 1 | GBR; 2 | HUN; 3 | BEL; 5 | ITA; 2 | SIN; 3 | MAL; 5 | JPN; 4 | USA; 5 | MEX; 2 | **BRA**; 2 | **ABU**; 1 | | | | | 3rd | 305 |
| 2018 | Mercedes-AMG Petronas Motorsport | Mercedes AMG W09 | Mercedes M09 EQ Power+ 1.6 V6 t | AUS; 8 | BHR; 2 | CHN; 2 | AZE; 14^{†} | ESP; 2 | MON; 5 | CAN; 2 | FRA; 7 | **AUT**; Ret | GBR; 4 | GER; 2 | HUN; 5 | BEL; 4 | ITA; 3 | SIN; 4 | **RUS**; 2 | JPN; 2 | USA; 5 | MEX; 5 | BRA; 5 | ABU; 5 | | | | 5th | 247 |
| 2019 | Mercedes-AMG Petronas Motorsport | Mercedes AMG W10 | Mercedes M10 EQ Power+ 1.6 V6 t | AUS; 1 | BHR; 2 | **CHN**; 2 | **AZE**; 1 | **ESP**; 2 | MON; 3 | CAN; 4 | FRA; 2 | AUT; 3 | **GBR**; 2 | GER; Ret | HUN; 8 | BEL; 3 | ITA; 2 | SIN; 5 | RUS; 2 | JPN; 1 | MEX; 3 | **USA**; 1 | BRA; Ret | ABU; 4 | | | | 2nd | 326 |
| 2020 | Mercedes-AMG Petronas F1 Team | Mercedes AMG W11 | Mercedes M11 EQ Performance 1.6 V6 t | **AUT**; 1 | STY; 2 | HUN; 3 | GBR; 11 | **70A**; 3 | ESP; 3 | BEL; 2 | ITA; 5 | TUS; 2 | RUS; 1 | **EIF**; Ret | POR; 2 | **EMI**; 2 | TUR; 14 | BHR; 8 | **SKH**; 8 | ABU; 2 | | | | | | | | 2nd | 223 |
| 2021 | Mercedes-AMG Petronas F1 Team | Mercedes AMG W12 | Mercedes M12 E Performance 1.6 V6 t | BHR; 3 | EMI; Ret | **POR**; 3 | ESP; 3 | MON; Ret | AZE; 12 | FRA; 4 | STY; 3 | AUT; 2 | GBR; 3^{3} | HUN; Ret | BEL; 12 | NED; 3 | ITA; 3^{1} | RUS; 5 | **TUR**; 1 | USA; 6 | **MXC**; 15 | **SAP**; 3^{1} | QAT; Ret | SAU; 3 | ABU; 6 | | | 3rd | 226 |
| 2022 | Alfa Romeo F1 Team Orlen | Alfa Romeo C42 | Ferrari 066/7 1.6 V6 t | BHR; 6 | SAU; Ret | AUS; 8 | EMI; 5^{7} | MIA; 7 | ESP; 6 | MON; 9 | AZE; 11 | CAN; 7 | GBR; Ret | AUT; 11 | FRA; 14 | HUN; 20† | BEL; Ret | NED; Ret | ITA; 13 | SIN; 11 | JPN; 15 | USA; Ret | MXC; 10 | SAP; 9 | ABU; 15 | | | 10th | 49 |
| 2023 | Alfa Romeo F1 Team Stake | Alfa Romeo C43 | Ferrari 066/10 1.6 V6 t | BHR; 8 | SAU; 18 | AUS; 11 | AZE; 18 | MIA; 13 | MON; 11 | ESP; 19 | CAN; 10 | AUT; 15 | GBR; 12 | HUN; 12 | BEL; 12 | NED; 14 | ITA; 10 | SIN; Ret | JPN; Ret | QAT; 8 | USA; 12 | MXC; 15 | SAP; Ret | LVG; 17 | ABU; 19 | | | 15th | 10 |
| 2024 | Stake F1 Team Kick Sauber | Kick Sauber C44 | Ferrari 066/12 1.6 V6 t | BHR; 19 | SAU; 17 | AUS; 14 | JPN; 14 | CHN; Ret | MIA; 16 | EMI; 18 | MON; 13 | CAN; 13 | ESP; 16 | AUT; 16 | GBR; 15 | HUN; 16 | BEL; 15 | NED; 19 | ITA; 16 | AZE; 16 | SIN; 16 | USA; 17 | MXC; 14 | SAP; 13 | LVG; 18 | QAT; 11 | ABU; Ret | 22nd | 0 |
| 2026 | Cadillac F1 Team | Cadillac MAC-26 | Ferrari 067/6 1.6 V6 t | AUS; Ret | CHN; 13 | JPN; 19 | MIA; 18 | CAN; 16 | MON; Ret | BCN; Ret | AUT; Ret | GBR; 16 | BEL; 18 | HUN; Ret | NED; Ret | ITA; 19 | ESP; 18 | AZE; 16† | BHR; Ret | SIN; 19 | USA; Ret | MXC; Ret | SAP; DNS | LVG | QAT | ABU | | 23rd* | 0* |

^{†} Did not finish, but was classified as he had completed more than 90% of the race distance.
* Season still in progress.

Sporting positions
| Preceded by Frank Kechele | Formula Renault 2.0 NEC; Champion; 2008 | Succeeded by António Félix da Costa |
| Preceded by Brendon Hartley | Eurocup Formula Renault 2.0; Champion; 2008 | Succeeded by Albert Costa |
| Preceded by Jules Bianchi | Formula Three Masters; Winner; 2009–2010 | Succeeded by Felix Rosenqvist |
| Preceded by Esteban Gutiérrez | GP3 Series; Champion; 2011 | Succeeded by Mitch Evans |
Awards
| Preceded by Scuderia Ferrari | Lorenzo Bandini Trophy; 2018 | Succeeded by Antonio Giovinazzi |
| Preceded by Lewis Hamilton | DHL Fastest Lap Award; 2018 | Succeeded by Lewis Hamilton |
