= Beltoise BT01 =

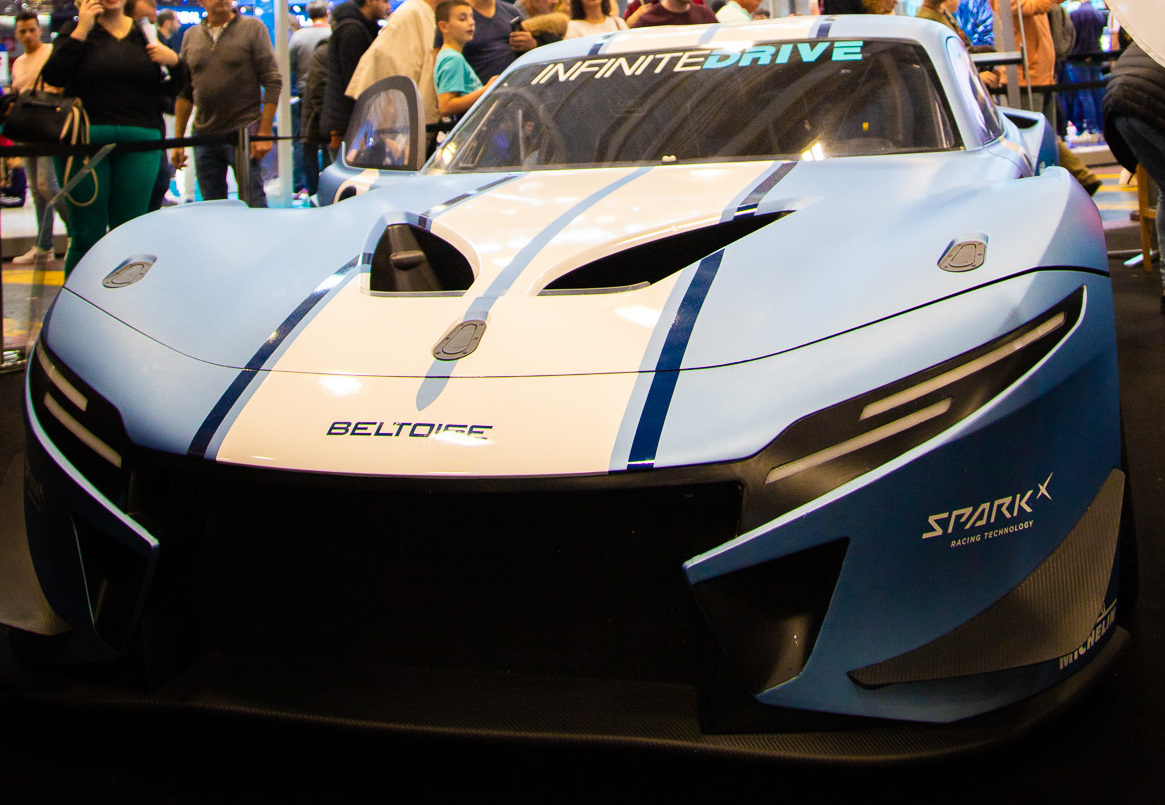

Overview
- Manufacturer: Beltoise eTechnology
- Production: 2022–present
- Assembly: France

Body and chassis
- Class: Race car
- Layout: Rear-engine, rear-wheel-drive

Powertrain
- Electric motor: 290 kW (390 hp)
- Battery: 46 kWh

Dimensions
- Curb weight: 1,200 kg (2,646 lb)

The Beltoise BT01 is an electric GT race car built by Beltoise eTechnology presented at the 2022 Paris Motor Show.

== Overview ==
The Beltoise BT01 was designed to be an all-electric competition GT, developing 394 PS (290 kW), allowing it to go from 0–100 km/h (0–62 mph) in less than four seconds and on to a top speed of over 210 km/h (130 mph). It was developed in collaboration with Spark Racing Technology, specialists in Formula E and Extreme E electric racing vehicles.

A road version is expected, but will initially be built for circuit use only. After the first seven BT01s have been built, Beltoise will produce a second racing version to meet the FIA standards required for competition homologation, with a run of 20 models planned from 2023 in France and internationally.

Beltoise eTechnology plans to build between 150 and 200 units of the BT01 over a five-year period worldwide, with an estimated price tag of around £130,000.

== Media/games ==
The Beltoise BT01 was added to the Asphalt 8: Airborne game in the Ninth Anniversary Update as a low-class-C car as a gift.
