= Spark Racing Technology =

French motorsport manufacturer

- Type: Private
- Industry: Automotive
- Founded: 2012
- Founder: Frédéric Vasseur
- Headquarters: Tigery, France
- Website: sparkracingtechnology.com

Spark Racing Technology (SRT) is a motorsport manufacturer specialized in the development and engineering of high-performance electric vehicles and modules. The company was founded by Frédéric Vasseur to become the sole chassis supplier for the FIA Formula E Championship but is now involved in other projects as well.

== History ==
The company was officially registered in October 2012.

=== Formula E ===
In 2010, Frédéric Vasseur's ART Grand Prix team built the Formulec EF01 car in an effort to get a supplier deal for the newly forming all-electric series. It was later chosen as the base vehicle for the development of the new chassis. In November 2012, the Formula E promoter and organiser, Formula E Holdings, declared that Spark Racing Technology was officially mandated to design and build all 40 Spark-Renault SRT_01E single-seaters.

==== SRT01-e ====
The car was developed in collaboration with McLaren Electronic Systems, Williams Advanced Engineering, Dallara and Renault. In the inaugural season, all teams ran this car as the series was fully spec. Starting with the 2015–16 season, teams were allowed to develop their own powertrains and software with the other parts remaining spec. Teams had the option to revert to McLaren's "SRT01-e" powertrain from the inaugural season, which Team Aguri and Amlin Andretti took advantage of in the 2015–16 season. Spark updated the chassis for the 2016–17 season, introducing a more complex front wing.

The chassis was in competition for four seasons (2014–15, 2015–16, 2016–17 and 2017–18) and 45 ePrix events.

==== SRT05e ====
The FIA put the chassis supply for the seasons 5 to 7 out to tender. Spark won the new tender with a completely redesigned chassis which included the halo safety device. The chassis' lifespan was later extended to four seasons, with a visual update package originally planned for the car's third season (2020–21), being delayed to 2021–22, due to the COVID-19 pandemic. This update package is known as Gen2EVO. However, the Gen2EVO never debuted as the COVID-19 pandemic worsened before season 8, prompting FIA to scrap the project.

=== Other projects ===
- In 2019, Spark was confirmed as the official car provider for the new Extreme E series. The Extreme E SUV, the Spark Odyssey 21 was revealed at the 2019 Goodwood Festival of Speed.
- Spark Racing Technology is a shareholder and technical partner of FUELL. The company, which is a partnership between Spark, Erik Buell and Vanguard Motorcycles, develops electric bikes.
- The Beltoise BT01: The first vehicle of Beltoise eTechnology. A 100% electric GT, designed for competition and driving courses. The BT01 reconciles motorsport and sustainable development.

== Vehicles ==
Year	Car	Class	Picture
2014	Spark-Renault SRT_01E	Formula E	
2018	Spark SRT05e	Formula E	
2021	Spark Odyssey 21	Extreme E	
2022	Formula E Gen3	Formula E	
2025	Spark Pioneer 25	Extreme H	
2026	Formula E Gen4	Formula E	
