= Fred Vasseur =

French motorsport executive (born 1968)

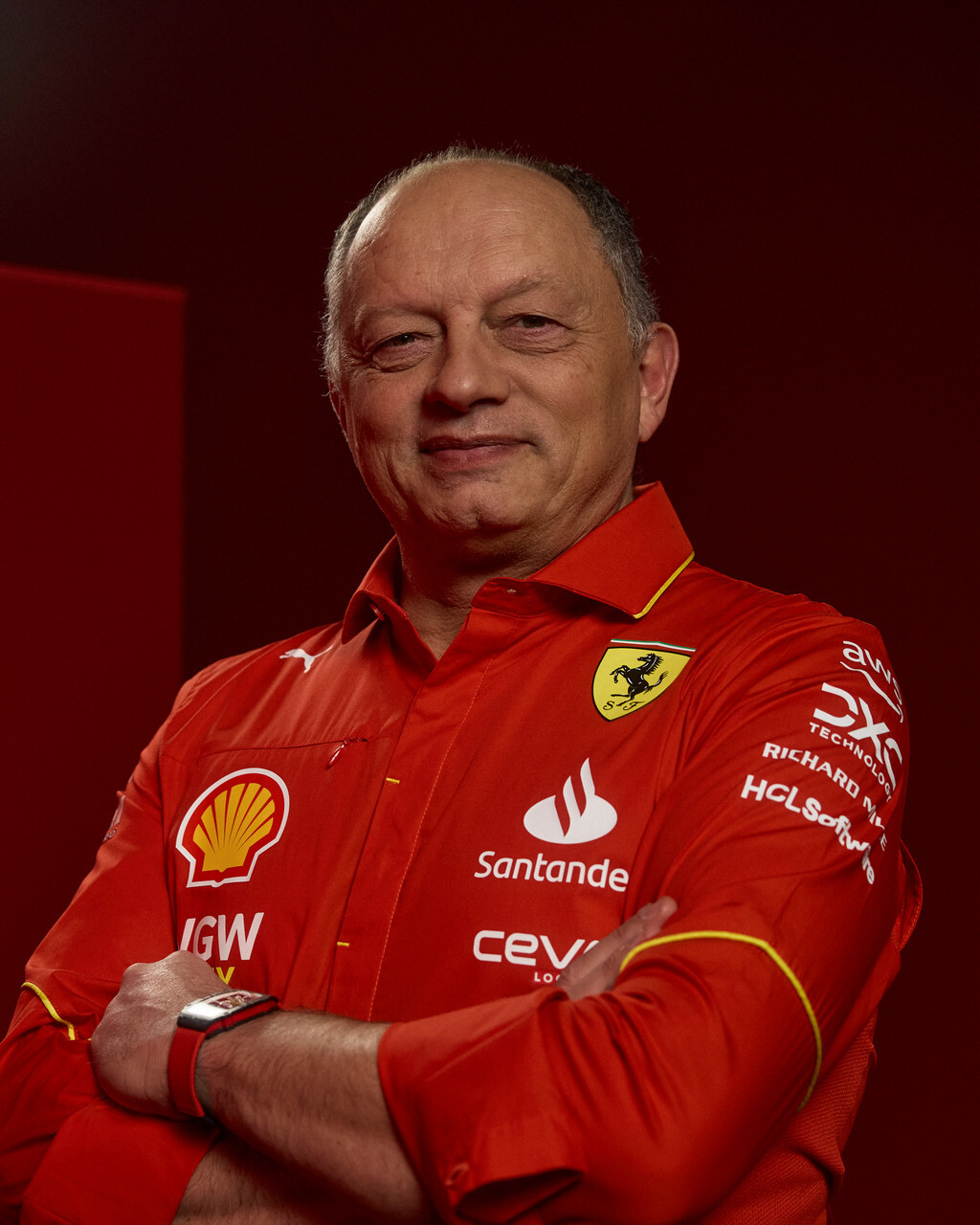
- Vasseur in 2024
- Born: Frédéric Jean Henri Vasseur; 28 May 1968 (age 58); Draveil, Essonne, France
- Education: ESTACA
- Occupations: Motorsport executive; businessman; engineer
- Employers: Formula Three; ASM (1996–2004); GP2/FIA Formula 2; ART (2005–2017); Formula One; Renault (2016); Sauber (2017–2018); Alfa Romeo (2019–2022); Ferrari (2023–present)
- Title: Team Principal
- Spouse: Marie Laure (m. 1999)
- Children: 4

Frédéric Jean Henri Vasseur (French pronunciation: [fʁedeʁik vasœʁ]; born 28 May 1968) is a French motorsport executive, businessman and engineer. Since 2023, Vasseur has served as team principal of Ferrari in Formula One; he previously served as team principal of Renault, Sauber and Alfa Romeo.

Born and raised in Paris, Vasseur studied automotive engineering at (ESTACA). He founded ASM in 1996, winning several national and continental Formula Three championships. In 2004, Vasseur partnered with Nicolas Todt to co-found ART Grand Prix, winning the GP2 Series back-to-back with Nico Rosberg and Lewis Hamilton in 2005 and 2006, respectively. Until 2017—under the leadership of Vasseur—ART won four GP2 teams' championships, amongst five consecutive titles in the Formula 3 Euro Series from 2005 to 2009. Vasseur joined Renault in 2016 as their first team principal upon their return to Formula One, resigning at the end of the season and joining Sauber for 2017. After six seasons at Sauber—later known as Alfa Romeo—Vasseur moved to Ferrari in 2023, leading the team to victory at eight Grands Prix, as of the 2026 Singapore Grand Prix.

Outside of team management, Vasseur founded Spark Racing Technology in 2013, becoming the official chassis constructor for Formula E in its inaugural season, and since producing the SRT_01E (2014), SRT05e (2018), Gen3 (2022) and Gen3 Evo (2024). Spark also hold the license for Extreme E, producing the Odyssey 21, which has been in use since 2021.

== Early and personal life ==
Frédéric Jean Henri Vasseur was born on 28 May 1968 in Draveil, Île-de-France, France. He married his wife Marie Laure on 31 July 1999 and together they have 4 sons.

== Career ==
=== Education and junior formulae (1996–2015) ===
Vasseur studied automotive and engineering at Higher School of Aeronautical Techniques and Automotive Construction (ESTACA), graduating in 1995.

In 2004, he jointly formed with Nicolas Todt, the ART Grand Prix team that won the GP2 Series championship with Nico Rosberg in 2005 and Lewis Hamilton in 2006.

As the boss of the ASM team in 1998, which, in partnership with Renault, won the French Formula 3 championship with David Saelens in 1998, and the Formula 3 Euroseries championships in partnership with Mercedes-Benz with Jamie Green, Lewis Hamilton, Paul di Resta and Romain Grosjean, from 2004 to 2007.

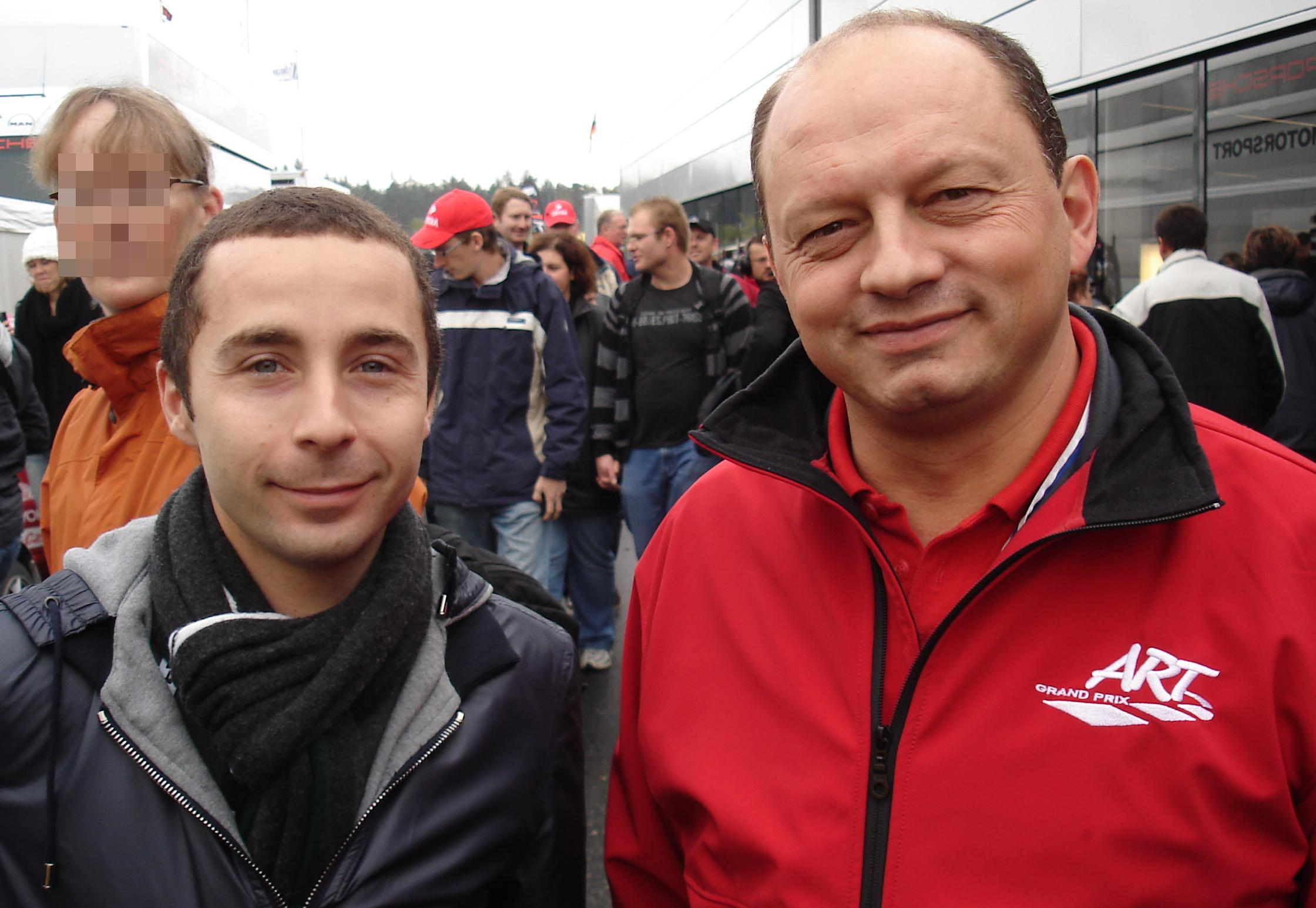
ART Grand Prix co-founders Nicolas Todt and Vasseur in 2009.

At the end of 2013, he obtained the contract from the FIA to construct the 40 chassis for the inaugural Formula E series for his newly formed venture Spark Racing Technology; the company has continued to keep this contract.

=== Formula One (2016–present) ===
==== Renault (2016) ====
Vasseur joined Renault Sport as team principal of the Renault Sport Formula One Team during the 2016 Formula One season. He resigned at the end of the 2016 season after disagreements with the managing director, Cyril Abiteboul, on how the team should be run. Subsequently, he was hired by Sauber in July 2017.

==== Sauber/Alfa Romeo (2017–2022) ====
On 12 July 2017, Sauber announced that they had signed up Vasseur as managing director and CEO of Sauber Motorsport as well as team principal of the Sauber F1 Team.

==== Ferrari (2023–present) ====
In December 2022, Vasseur replaced Mattia Binotto as team principal of Ferrari for the 2023 season; he became the fourth non-Italian and the second French person to lead the team. Vasseur achieved his first victory as team principal when Carlos Sainz Jr. won the Singapore Grand Prix, the only non-Red Bull win of the season. He achieved his first 1–2 finish at the 2024 Australian Grand Prix. Throughout 2024, Vasseur and Ferrari achieved several further wins—in Monaco, Italy, the United States and Mexico City—with the team finishing runner-up to McLaren in the World Constructors' Championship.
