= 2021 Formula One World Championship =

72nd Formula One season

The 2021 FIA Formula One World Championship was a motor racing championship for Formula One cars which was the 72nd running of the Formula One World Championship. It is recognised by the Fédération Internationale de l'Automobile (FIA), the governing body of international motorsport, as the highest class of competition for open-wheel racing cars. The championship was contested over twenty-two Grands Prix, and held around the world. Drivers and teams competed for the titles of World Drivers' Champion and World Constructors' Champion, respectively.

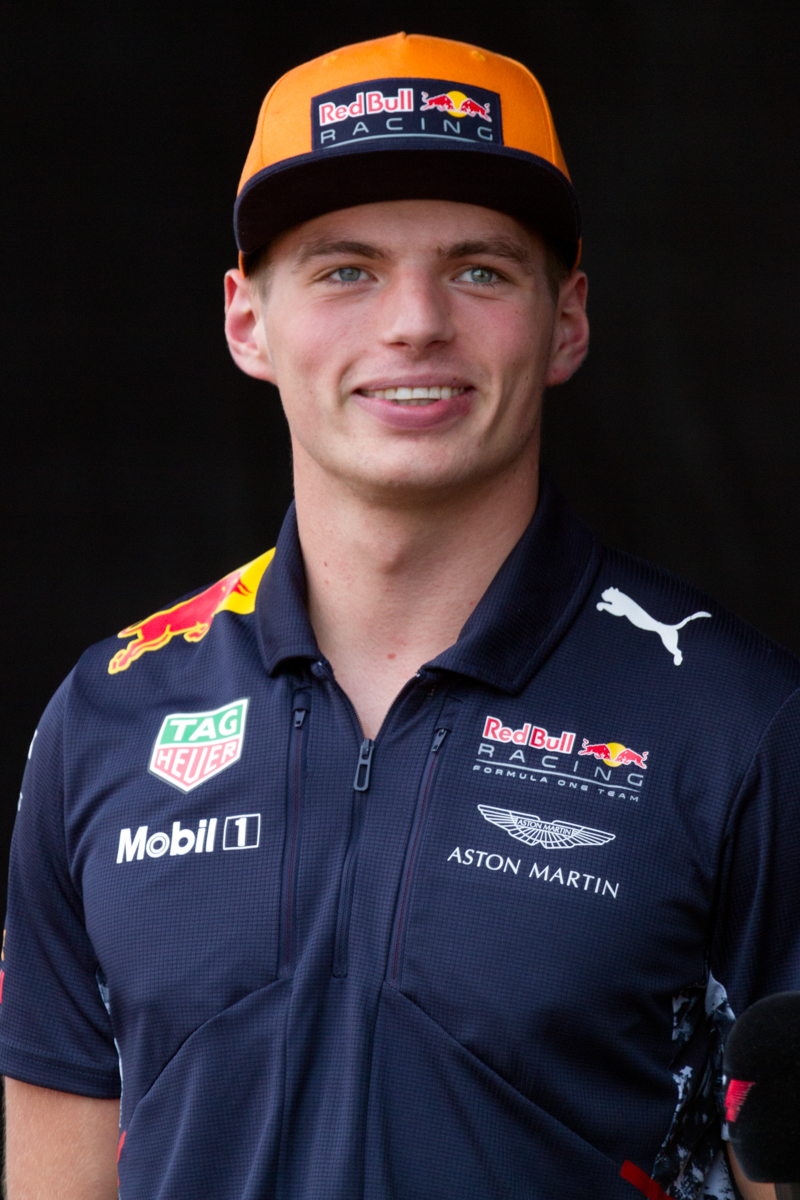
Max Verstappen (pictured in 2017) won his first World Championship (and the first for a Dutch driver), driving for Red Bull Racing-Honda.

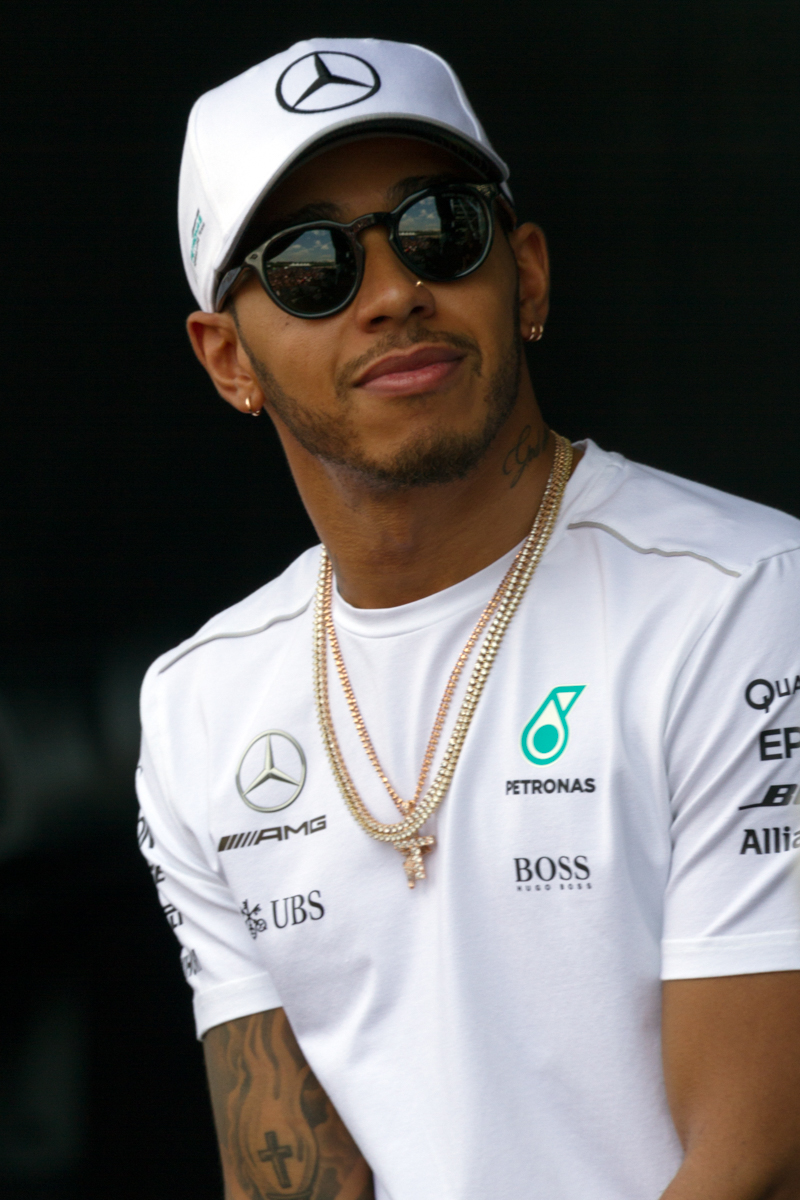
Lewis Hamilton (pictured in 2017), the defending champion, finished runner-up by 8 points driving for Mercedes.

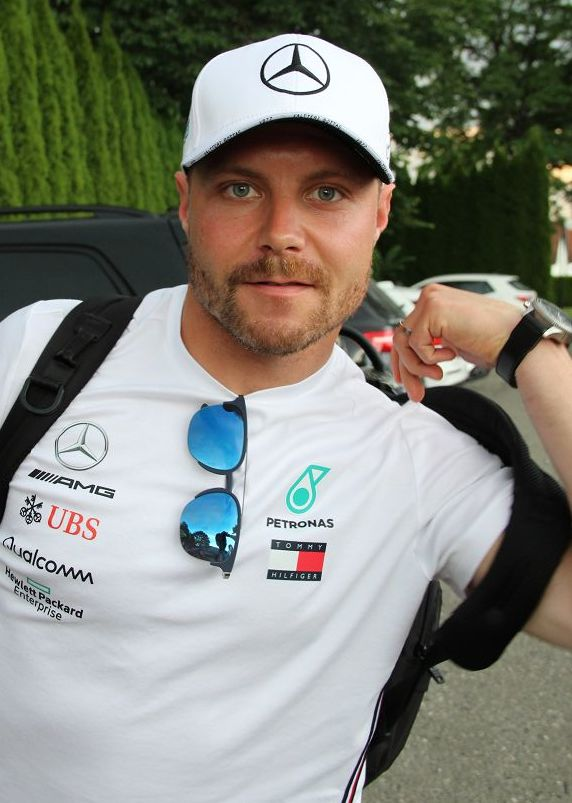
Hamilton's teammate Valtteri Bottas (pictured in 2019) was third, in his final season with the team.

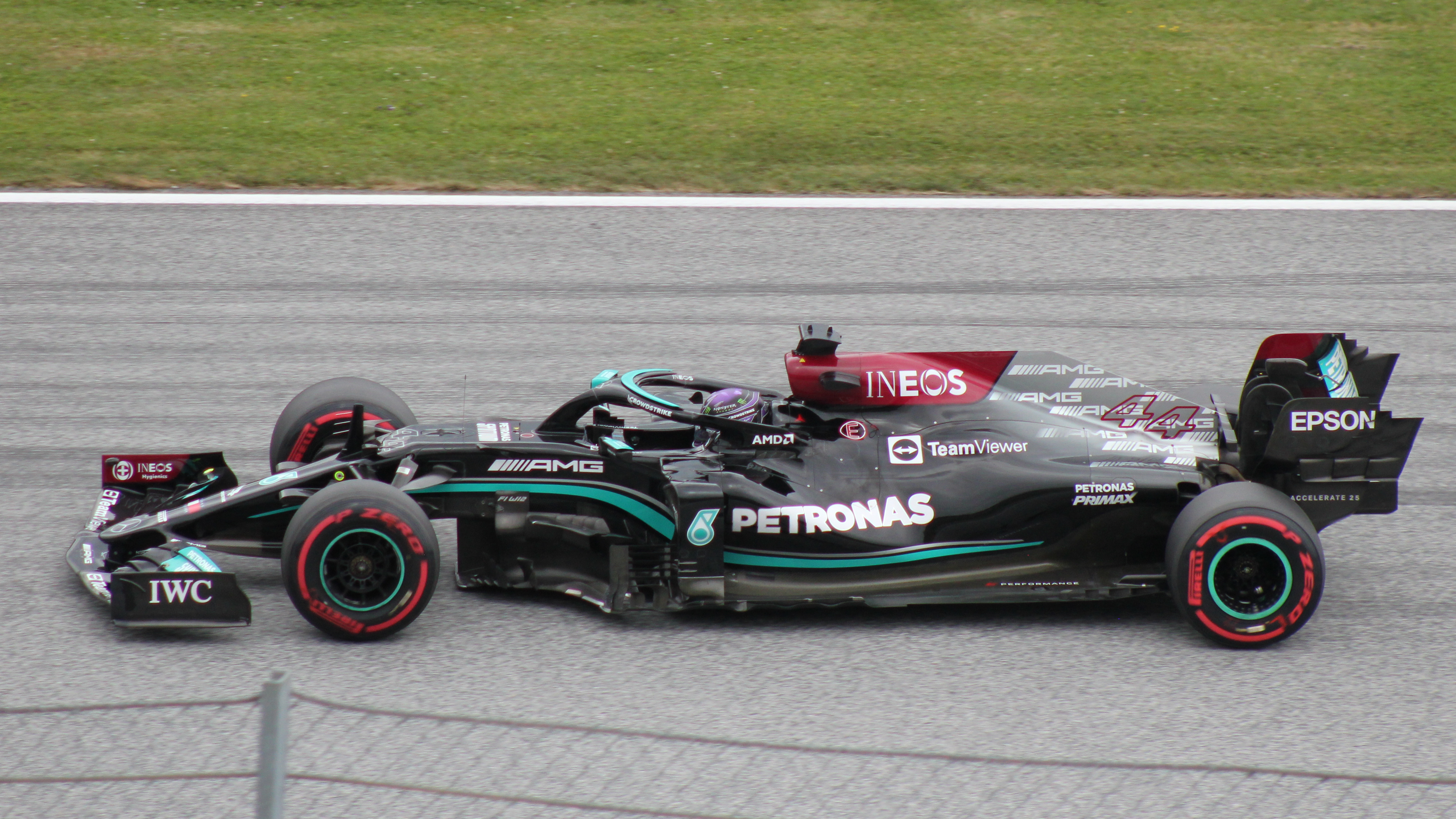
Mercedes won their eighth consecutive Constructors' Championship.

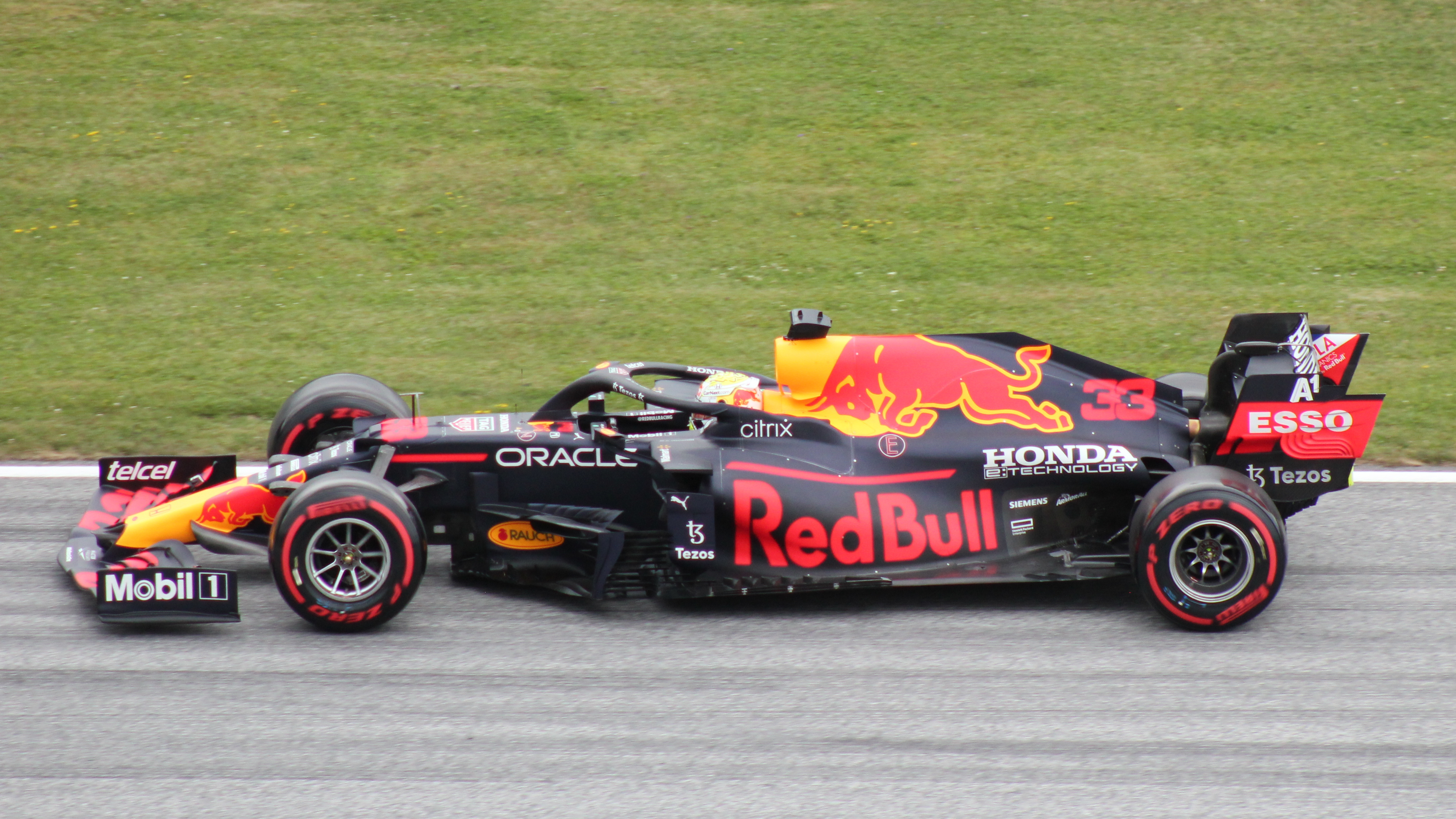
Red Bull finished second in the Constructors' Championship.

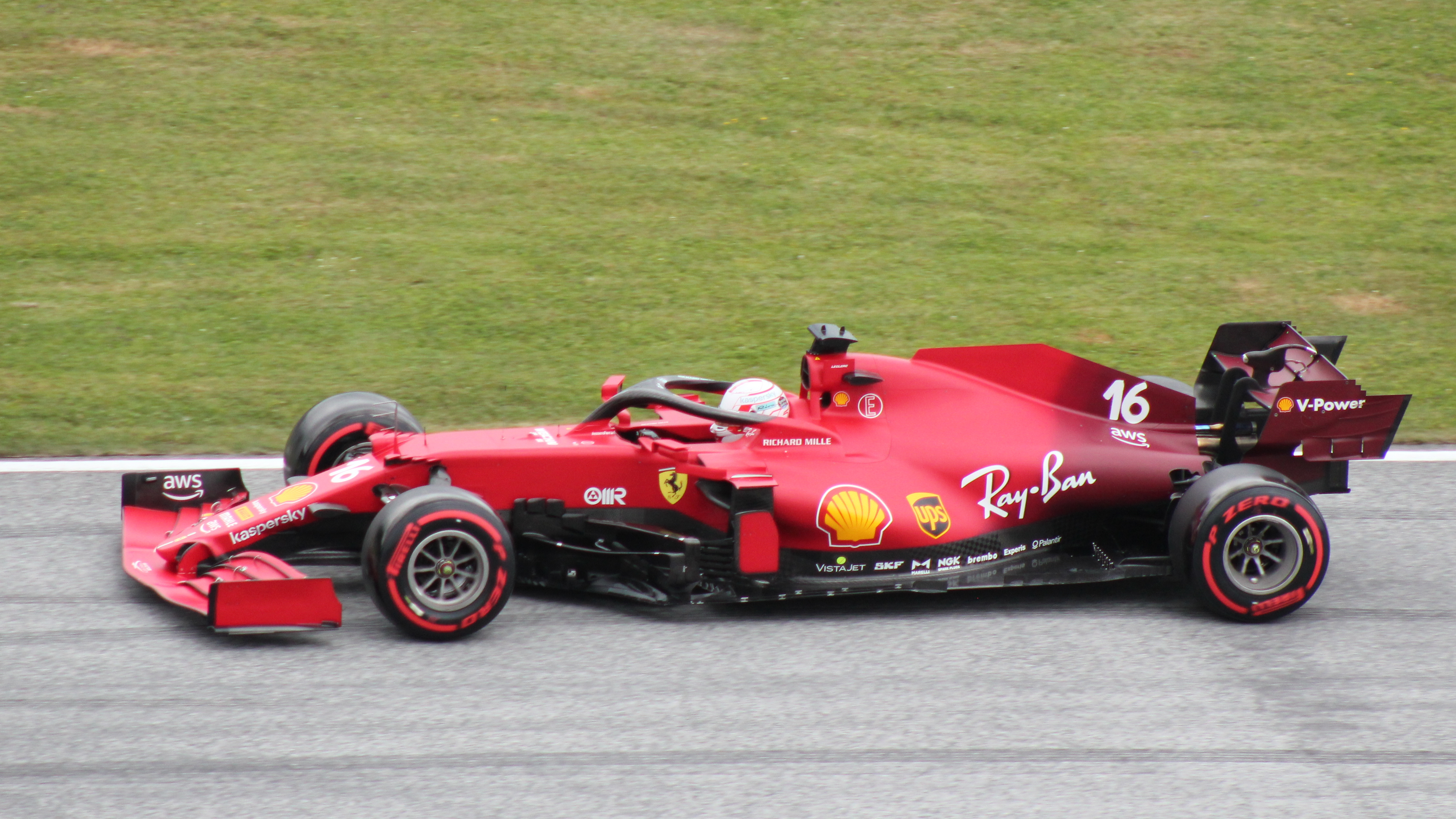
Ferrari finished third in the Constructors' Championship.

Max Verstappen of Red Bull Racing-Honda won the Drivers' Championship for the first time in his career, having claimed 10 race wins across the season. Verstappen became the first-ever driver from the Netherlands, the first Honda-powered driver since Ayrton Senna in 1991, the first Red Bull driver since Sebastian Vettel in 2013 and the first non-Mercedes driver in the turbo-hybrid era to win the World Championship. This season saw the return of Aston Martin since 1960 after Lawrence Stroll invested into the British marque.

Honda became the second engine supplier in the turbo-hybrid era to power a championship-winning car, after Mercedes. Four-time defending and seven-time champion Lewis Hamilton of Mercedes finished runner-up. Mercedes retained the Constructors' Championship for the eighth consecutive season.

The season featured a close year-long battle for the title between Verstappen and Hamilton, with BBC Sport's Andrew Benson describing it as "one of the most intense, hard-fought battles in sporting history". The two drivers exchanged the championship lead multiple times during the season and the title contenders were involved in major collisions at the British and Italian Grands Prix as well as minor collisions at the Emilia Romagna and Saudi Arabian Grands Prix. Both drivers entered the season-ending Abu Dhabi Grand Prix tied on points, which ended with a controversial finish, as it was deemed that race control did not handle a late safety car period fully according to the regulations. Verstappen produced a last lap overtake on Hamilton after a late safety car restart on the final lap of season to win his maiden World Drivers' Championship. Mercedes initially protested the results, and later decided not to appeal after their protest was denied. A review of the incident led to key structural changes to race control, including the removal of Michael Masi from his role as race director and the implementation of a virtual race control room, which assists the race director.

This was the first season since 2008 where the champion driver was not from the team that took the constructors' title. The season was also the final season in the sport for 2007 World Champion Kimi Räikkönen.

== Entries ==
All teams competed with tyres supplied by Pirelli. Each team was required to enter at least two drivers, one for each of the two mandatory cars.

Teams and drivers that competed in the 2021 World Championship
Entrant	Constructor	Chassis	Power unit	Race drivers		
Entrant	Constructor	Chassis	Power unit	No.	Driver name	Rounds
(Switzerland) Alfa Romeo Racing Orlen	Alfa Romeo Racing-Ferrari	C41	Ferrari 065/6	7; 88; 99	(Finland) Kimi Räikkönen (Poland) Robert Kubica (Italy) Antonio Giovinazzi	1–13, 15–22 (Note: Räikkönen was entered into the Dutch Grand Prix, but later withdrew after testing positive for coronavirus.); 13–14; All
(Italy) Scuderia AlphaTauri Honda	AlphaTauri-Honda	AT02	Honda RA621H	10; 22	(France) Pierre Gasly (Japan) Yuki Tsunoda	All; All
(France) Alpine F1 Team	Alpine-Renault	A521	Renault E-Tech 20B	14; 31	(Spain) Fernando Alonso (France) Esteban Ocon	All; All
(United Kingdom) Aston Martin Cognizant F1 Team	Aston Martin-Mercedes	AMR21	Mercedes-AMG F1 M12	5; 18	(Germany) Sebastian Vettel (Canada) Lance Stroll	All; All
(Italy) Scuderia Ferrari Mission Winnow (Note: Ferrari entered round 1 as "Scuderia Mission Winnow Ferrari", rounds 2–6, 15, 17–22 as "Scuderia Ferrari Mission Winnow", and rounds 7–14, 16 as "Scuderia Ferrari".)	Ferrari	SF21	Ferrari 065/6	16; 55	(Monaco) Charles Leclerc (Spain) Carlos Sainz Jr.	All; All
(United States) Uralkali Haas F1 Team	Haas-Ferrari	VF-21	Ferrari 065/6	9; 47	(Russian Automobile Federation) Nikita Mazepin (Note: Mazepin is Russian, but he competed as a neutral competitor using the designation RAF (Russian Automobile Federation), as the Court of Arbitration for Sport upheld a ban on Russia competing at World Championships. The ban was implemented by the World Anti-Doping Agency in response to state-sponsored doping program of Russian athletes.) (Germany) Mick Schumacher	All (Note: Mazepin was entered into the Abu Dhabi Grand Prix, but later withdrew after testing positive for coronavirus.); All
(United Kingdom) McLaren F1 Team	McLaren-Mercedes	MCL35M	Mercedes-AMG F1 M12	3; 4	(Australia) Daniel Ricciardo (United Kingdom) Lando Norris	All; All
(Germany) Mercedes-AMG Petronas F1 Team	Mercedes	F1 W12	Mercedes-AMG F1 M12	44; 77	(United Kingdom) Lewis Hamilton (Finland) Valtteri Bottas	All; All
(Austria) Red Bull Racing Honda	Red Bull Racing-Honda	RB16B	Honda RA621H	11; 33	(Mexico) Sergio Pérez (Netherlands) Max Verstappen	All; All
(United Kingdom) Williams Racing	Williams-Mercedes	FW43B	Mercedes-AMG F1 M12	6; 63	(Canada) Nicholas Latifi (United Kingdom) George Russell	All; All

=== Free practice drivers ===
Across the season, five drivers drove as a test or third driver in free practice sessions. Callum Ilott and Robert Kubica drove for Alfa Romeo Racing at two and three Grands Prix respectively, while Roy Nissany and Jack Aitken drove for Williams at three Grands Prix and at the Abu Dhabi Grand Prix, respectively. Zhou Guanyu drove for Alpine at the Austrian Grand Prix.

Drivers that took part in first or second free practice sessions
Constructor	Practice drivers		
Constructor	No.	Driver name	Rounds
Alfa Romeo-Ferrari	98; 88	(Great Britain) Callum Ilott (Poland) Robert Kubica	3, 9; 4, 8, 11
Alpine-Renault	37	(China) Zhou Guanyu	9
Williams-Mercedes	45; 89	(Israel) Roy Nissany (Great Britain) Jack Aitken	4, 7, 9; 22

=== Team changes ===
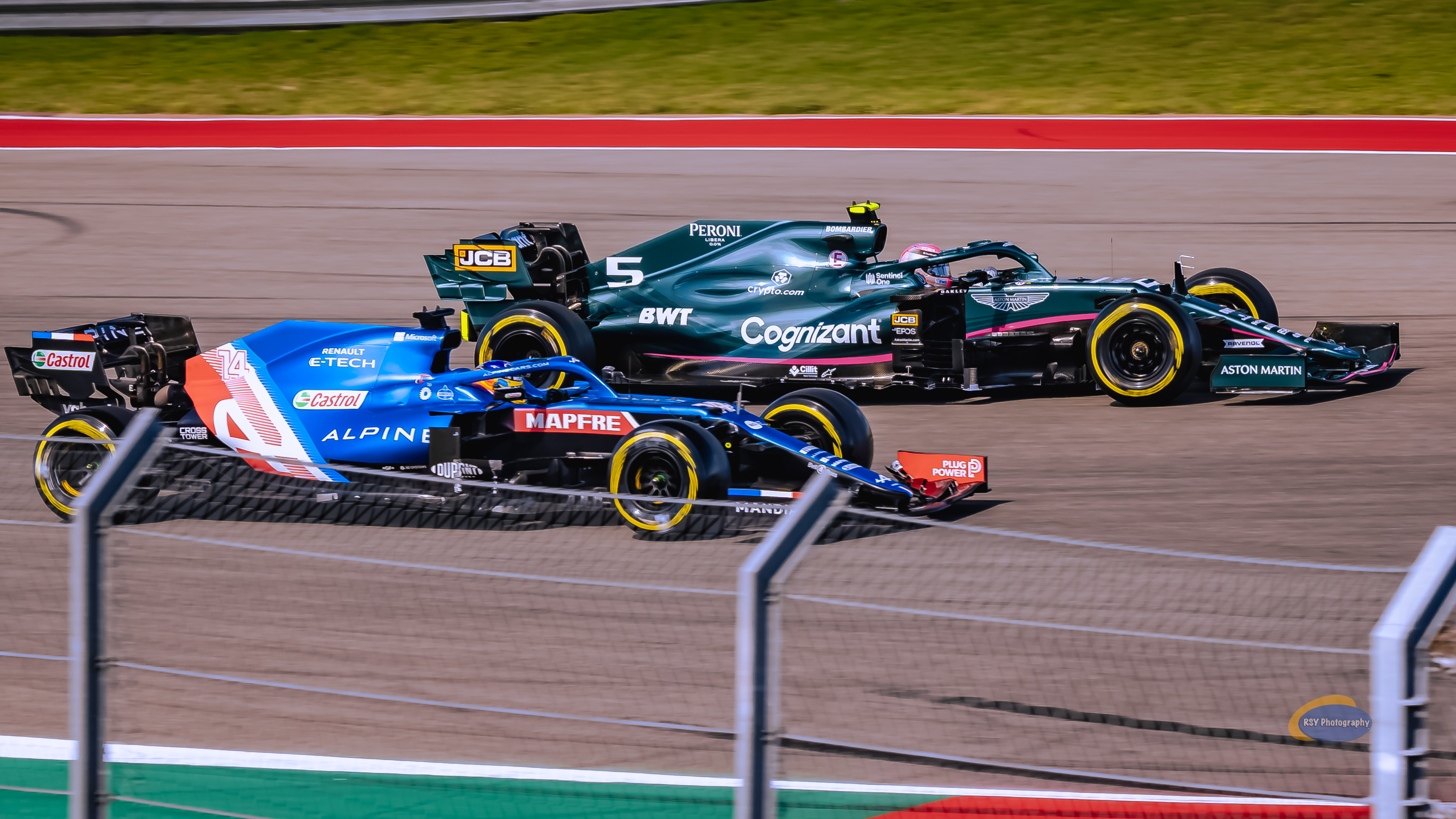
Aston Martin (right) returned to the Formula One World Championship after last competing in 1960, while Renault was rebranded to Alpine (left).

McLaren announced that they would change from using Renault power units to ones built by Mercedes, resuming the McLaren-Mercedes partnership that ran between 1995 and 2014. Racing Point became known as Aston Martin. The name change was brought about by the team's part owner Lawrence Stroll investing in the Aston Martin marque making its return to the sport since 1960. Renault became known as Alpine, taking on the name of Renault's sportscar brand.

=== Driver changes ===
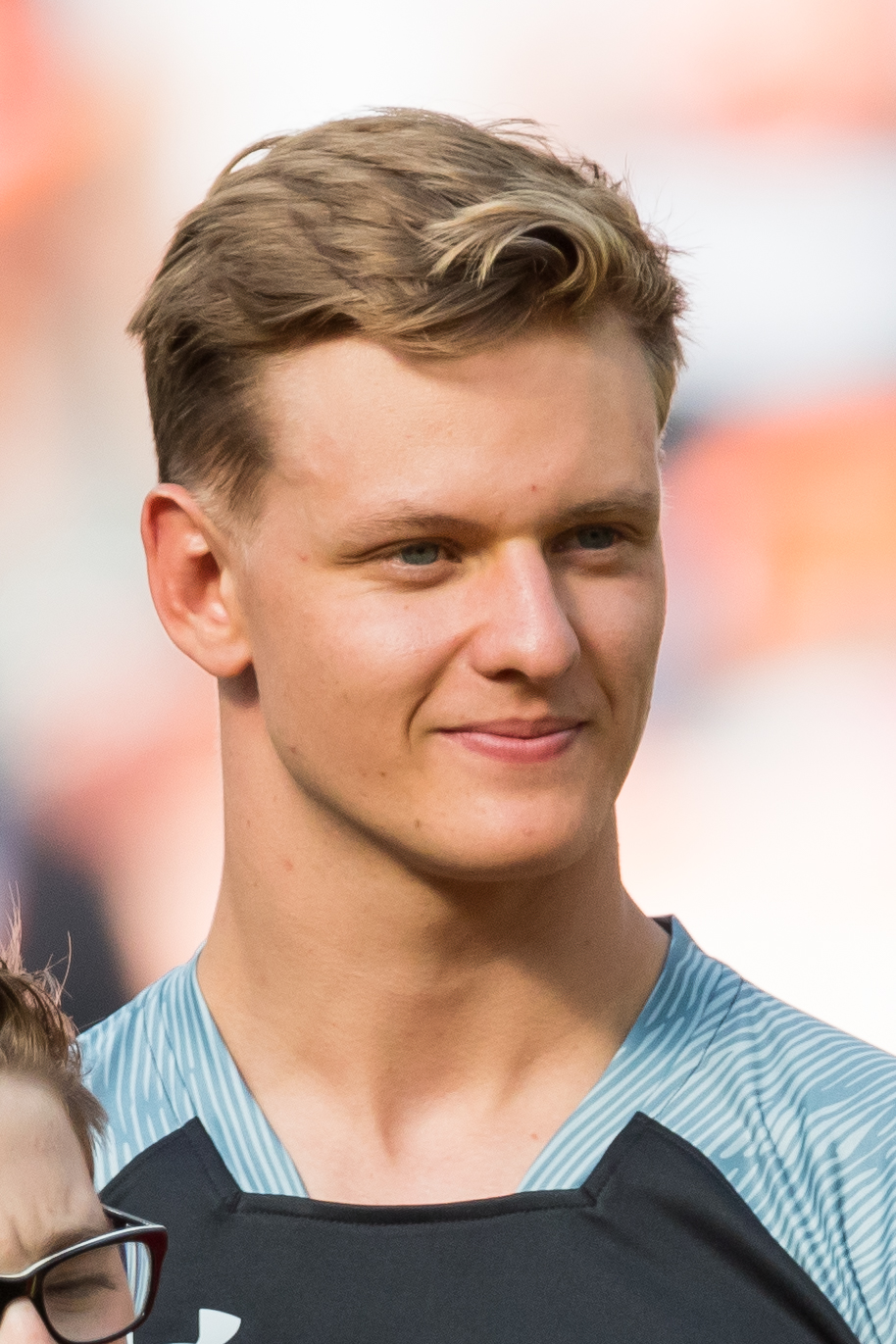
Mick Schumacher made his Formula One debut with Haas.

Four-time World Drivers' Champion Sebastian Vettel left Ferrari at the end of the 2020 season after racing with the team for six seasons. Vettel's seat was taken by Carlos Sainz Jr., who had left McLaren after two seasons. Daniel Ricciardo moved from Renault to McLaren, where he replaced Sainz. Ricciardo was replaced by double World Champion Fernando Alonso, who drove in Alpine's first season, having last raced in 2018 for McLaren.

Vettel moved to Aston Martin, where he replaced Sergio Pérez. Pérez, who had previously signed a contract to drive for Aston Martin's predecessor, Racing Point, until 2022, moved to Red Bull Racing where he replaced Alexander Albon, who was Red Bull Racing's reserve and test driver for the 2021 season. Pérez became the first driver since Mark Webber in 2007 to join the team without being previously a Red Bull Junior Team member.

Romain Grosjean and Kevin Magnussen, who had raced for Haas since 2016 and 2017 respectively, left the team at the end of 2020. 2020 Formula 2 Champion Mick Schumacher, the son of seven-time World Champion Michael Schumacher, took one of the seats at the team while the other was filled by Nikita Mazepin, who finished fifth in the Formula 2 Championship.

Yuki Tsunoda, who finished third in 2020 Formula 2 Championship, graduated to Formula One with Scuderia AlphaTauri, replacing Daniil Kvyat, who moved to Alpine as their reserve driver. Tsunoda became the first Japanese Formula One driver since Kamui Kobayashi in 2014.

==== Mid-season changes ====
During the Dutch Grand Prix weekend, Kimi Räikkönen tested positive for coronavirus. He was replaced at Alfa Romeo Racing by reserve driver Robert Kubica, who last raced at the 2019 Abu Dhabi Grand Prix, driving for Williams. Räikkönen was also replaced by Kubica at the subsequent Italian Grand Prix.

Nikita Mazepin tested positive for coronavirus during the Abu Dhabi Grand Prix weekend, and was not replaced for the race as Haas did not field a third driver in free practice.

== Calendar ==
The 2021 calendar consisted of twenty-two events, which were subject to the permissive COVID-19 regulations set by local governments and the Formula One Group. The British, Italian and São Paulo Grands Prix featured the sprint qualifying format.

Round	Grand Prix	Circuit	Race date
1	Bahrain Grand Prix	Bahrain International Circuit, Sakhir	28 March
2	Emilia Romagna Grand Prix	(Italy) Imola Circuit, Imola	18 April
3	Portuguese Grand Prix	(Portugal) Algarve International Circuit, Portimão	2 May
4	Spanish Grand Prix	(Spain) Circuit de Barcelona-Catalunya, Montmeló	9 May
5	Monaco Grand Prix	Circuit de Monaco, Monte Carlo	23 May
6	Azerbaijan Grand Prix	(Azerbaijan) Baku City Circuit, Baku	6 June
7	French Grand Prix	(France) Circuit Paul Ricard, Le Castellet	20 June (Note: The French Grand Prix was originally due to take place on 27 June, but was rescheduled due to the postponement of the Turkish Grand Prix.)
8	Styrian Grand Prix	(Austria) Red Bull Ring, Spielberg	27 June
9	Austrian Grand Prix	(Austria) Red Bull Ring, Spielberg	4 July
10	British Grand Prix	(United Kingdom) Silverstone Circuit, Silverstone	18 July
11	Hungarian Grand Prix	(Hungary) Hungaroring, Mogyoród	1 August
12	Belgian Grand Prix	(Belgium) Circuit de Spa-Francorchamps, Stavelot	29 August
13	Dutch Grand Prix	(Netherlands) Circuit Zandvoort, Zandvoort	5 September
14	Italian Grand Prix	(Italy) Monza Circuit, Monza	12 September
15	Russian Grand Prix	(Russia) Sochi Autodrom, Sochi	26 September
16	Turkish Grand Prix	(Turkey) Istanbul Park, Tuzla	10 October (Note: The Turkish Grand Prix was originally due to take place on 13 June in place of the cancelled Canadian Grand Prix. It was first postponed and then re-added to the calendar in place of the cancelled Singapore Grand Prix, before being rescheduled due to the reduction of the number of Grands Prix into the calendar.)
17	United States Grand Prix	(United States) Circuit of the Americas, Austin, Texas	24 October
18	Mexico City Grand Prix	Autódromo Hermanos Rodríguez, Mexico City	7 November (Note: The Mexico City Grand Prix was originally due to take place on 31 October, but was rescheduled due to the reduction of the number of Grands Prix into the calendar.)
19	São Paulo Grand Prix	(Brazil) Interlagos Circuit, São Paulo	14 November (Note: The São Paulo Grand Prix was originally due to take place on 14 November, but was initially rescheduled to 7 November due to the postponement of the Australian Grand Prix, which was later cancelled. It was later rescheduled due to the reduction of the number of Grands Prix into the calendar.)
20	Qatar Grand Prix	(Qatar) Lusail International Circuit, Lusail	21 November
21	Saudi Arabian Grand Prix	(Saudi Arabia) Jeddah Corniche Circuit, Jeddah	5 December (Note: The Saudi Arabian Grand Prix was originally due to take place on 28 November, but was rescheduled due to the postponement of the Australian Grand Prix, which was later cancelled.)
22	Abu Dhabi Grand Prix	(United Arab Emirates) Yas Marina Circuit, Abu Dhabi	12 December (Note: The Abu Dhabi Grand Prix was originally due to take place on 5 December, but was rescheduled due to the postponement of the Australian Grand Prix, which was later cancelled.)

The following rounds were planned, but were cancelled in response to the COVID-19 pandemic:

Grand Prix	Circuit	Scheduled date
Chinese Grand Prix	(China) Shanghai International Circuit, Shanghai	11 April
Canadian Grand Prix	(Canada) Circuit Gilles Villeneuve, Montreal	13 June
Singapore Grand Prix	Marina Bay Street Circuit, Singapore	3 October
Japanese Grand Prix	(Japan) Suzuka International Racing Course, Suzuka	10 October
Australian Grand Prix	(Australia) Albert Park Circuit, Melbourne	21 November (Note: The Australian Grand Prix was originally due to take place on 21 March, but was rescheduled due to the COVID-19 pandemic. It was later replaced by the Qatar Grand Prix.)

=== Calendar expansion and changes from 2020 to 2021 ===
Liberty Media, the sport's commercial rights holders, announced that there would be scope for the 2021 calendar to expand beyond the planned twenty-two races of the 2020 calendar. The sporting regulations were amended to allow for a maximum of twenty-five Grands Prix per year.

- The Emilia Romagna Grand Prix at the Autodromo Internazionale Enzo e Dino Ferrari in Imola, which was originally intended to be held as a one-off event in 2020, was the second round of the championship.
- The Portuguese Grand Prix, which was originally intended to make a one-off return in 2020 at the Autódromo Internacional do Algarve in Portimão, was the third round of the championship.
- The Styrian Grand Prix at the Red Bull Ring in Spielberg, which was originally intended to be a one-off race in 2020, was the eighth round of the championship, meaning the circuit hosted back-to-back races for a second season in a row.
- The Dutch Grand Prix was revived, with the race taking place at the Circuit Zandvoort. The race marked the first time the Dutch Grand Prix has been run since 1985. The Dutch Grand Prix had been included on the 2020 calendar, but was cancelled in response to the COVID-19 pandemic.
- The Turkish Grand Prix at Istanbul Park in Istanbul, which was originally intended to make a one-off return in 2020, was the sixteenth round of the championship.
- The Qatar Grand Prix made its debut, with the race held at the Lusail International Circuit, the venue which has hosted the Qatar motorcycle Grand Prix since 2004. Further plans to have the Grand Prix into the calendar on a 10-year contract from 2023 onwards at a new purpose-built circuit were also revealed, before being retained in Lusail. The race took place at night, the fourth venue which hosted a night race after the Singapore, Bahrain and Sakhir Grands Prix. (Note: The Abu Dhabi Grand Prix is a day-to-night race.)
- The Saudi Arabian Grand Prix also made its debut, with the race held on a temporary circuit in the city of Jeddah. Further plans to move the Grand Prix to Qiddiya City in 2023 were also made public, before being retained in Jeddah. The race also took place at night, becoming the fifth venue to host a night race after the Singapore, Bahrain, Sakhir and Qatar Grands Prix.
- The Vietnamese Grand Prix would have made its debut, with the race scheduled to take place in the capital Hanoi on the Hanoi Circuit. The Vietnamese Grand Prix had been included on the 2020 calendar, but was cancelled in response to the COVID-19 pandemic. The Grand Prix was dropped from the 2021 calendar because of the arrest on corruption charges of former Hanoi chairman Nguyễn Đức Chung, a key official responsible for organising the race.

Further changes to the calendar are planned following the disruption to the 2020 championship brought about by the COVID-19 pandemic:

- The Azerbaijan and Monaco Grands Prix returned to the calendar. These Grands Prix were removed from the re-issued 2020 schedule because of the logistical difficulties associated with establishing a street circuit on short notice.
- The Brazilian, French and United States Grands Prix also return. The 2020 races, together with the debut of the Mexico City Grand Prix, were cancelled because of the pandemic. The returning Brazilian Grand Prix was renamed as the São Paulo Grand Prix in deference to the increased involvement from local government.
- The 70th Anniversary, Eifel, Sakhir and Tuscan Grands Prix were not included in the list of 2021 races. These Grands Prix were specifically introduced into the 2020 calendar in response to the COVID-19 pandemic, to ensure that as many races as possible could be held.

Liberty Media was also reported to have come to an agreement in principle with race organisers to host a second race in the United States. Plans to hold the race at a circuit in Miami Gardens were unveiled. A second proposal to move the former Brazilian Grand Prix from São Paulo to a new circuit in Rio de Janeiro was also suspended.

=== Calendar changes due to the COVID-19 pandemic ===
The original calendar that was approved by the FIA World Motor Sport Council included the Chinese Grand Prix, which was due to take place on 11 April. However, the event was postponed and later cancelled, due to travel restrictions. The Emilia Romagna Grand Prix at the Autodromo Enzo e Dino Ferrari in Imola, which was originally intended to be a one-off Grand Prix in 2020, was retained in its place. Additionally, the Australian Grand Prix, which had been due to take place on 21 March as the inaugural Grand Prix of the championship, was postponed to 21 November. On 6 July 2021, the postponement of the Australian Grand Prix was revised to be a cancellation for a second consecutive year, due to low vaccination rates and travel restrictions in place in Victoria. The dates for the São Paulo, Saudi Arabian and Abu Dhabi Grands Prix were changed to accommodate this.

On 28 April 2021, the Canadian Grand Prix was cancelled for a second consecutive year and was replaced by the Turkish Grand Prix, originally intended to make a one-off return in 2020. On 14 May 2021, the Turkish Grand Prix was postponed due to the British government imposing a ten-day hotel quarantine on travellers from Turkey into the United Kingdom. As a result, the French Grand Prix was moved forward a week and the Styrian Grand Prix, which was originally intended to be a one-off race in 2020, was added to the calendar in its place. On 4 June 2021, the Singapore Grand Prix, which was originally due to take place on 3 October, was cancelled due to ongoing safety and logistic concerns and was replaced by the re-joined Turkish Grand Prix.

On 18 August 2021, the Japanese Grand Prix was cancelled for a second consecutive year. The race calendar was revised again on 28 August 2021, consisting of twenty-two Grands Prix, with the Turkish, Mexico City and São Paulo Grands Prix moved a week later, the round in which the cancelled Australian Grand Prix was due to take place left empty in order to replace it, and the confirmation that the Japanese Grand Prix would not be replaced. On 30 September 2021 the new Qatar Grand Prix was announced in place of the cancelled Australian Grand Prix.

== Regulation changes ==
The 2021 championship was originally due to introduce significant changes to the regulations, including the sport's governance, car designs and the sporting rules but these were delayed in March 2020 in response to the disruption caused by the COVID-19 pandemic. These rule changes were instead introduced in 2022.

=== Financial regulation ===
The championship introduced a budget cap, with teams limited to spending a maximum of $145 million per year. (Note: Teams had originally agreed to a budget cap of $175 million per year, but this figure was revised to $145 million in response to the COVID-19 pandemic.) Teams were required to use more commercially available materials and to submit their annual expenditure. Some teams argued to further reduce the budget cap to $100 million, citing concerns that the long-term financial impact of the COVID-19 pandemic threatens the future of as many as four teams. Formula One managing director Ross Brawn stated that the sport's intention is to reduce the budget cap further in the coming years.

The value of the budget cap was set for twenty-one races; each additional race increased the budget cap by $1 million, and vice versa: each race removed from the scheduled twenty-one race calendar deducted the budget cap by $1 million. However, the budget cap did not include marketing budget, drivers' salaries, and the salaries of the team's top three executives. In addition, under a later agreement among the teams regarding the introduction of sprint qualifying races, each team received an additional $500,000 for the three sprint qualifying races on top of the current budget cap, and further flexibility on budget cap in case the cars got damaged during the sprint qualifying races. There were also additional restrictions dictating how prize money can be spent. The cap only applied to expenditure related to car performance, which remained in place until 2026. In the event that a team broke the financial regulations, the team can be penalised. It was originally planned a range of punishments for exceeding their annual budget, which include being deducted championship points, having reduced testing time, a race ban, or—for the most severe cases—disqualification from the championship. However, Toto Wolff later revealed that the intended sporting penalties such as points deductions and reduced testing for budget cap breaches would not be handed out, having been voted down by three teams including Red Bull and Ferrari.

=== Technical regulations ===
Teams were limited in what components could be modified for the 2021 season, with this requirement introduced to ease financial pressures on teams brought about by the COVID-19 pandemic. The teams were allowed to apply for special dispensation to make changes, most notably in the case of McLaren, who were given permission to modify their car to accommodate the switch from Renault to Mercedes engines. This prompted the FIA to introduce a token system whereby teams were given a series of tokens which could be exchanged for the introduction of specific component upgrades.

Some aerodynamic rule changes were enacted by the FIA. The floor of the cars were 'clipped' in order to reduce downforce for 2021. In 2020, the floor was permitted to run in a straight line from an area adjacent to the cockpit back to a point ahead of the rear tyre. However, from 2021 that point ahead of the tyre was moved 100 millimetres (3.9 in) inboard, making the floor edge a diagonal line when viewed from above. This change was expected to reduce downforce levels by 5%. Further, some slots on the edge of the floor were removed, brake duct winglets were narrowed by 40 millimetres (1.6 in) and diffuser fences were narrowed by 50 millimetres (2.0 in). These three changes have reduced downforce levels by a further 5%, meaning the 2021 regulations have seen a total 10% reduction in downforce. However, the teams increased downforce by 4–5% over the winter, so the overall downforce reduction was approximately 5%.

The "dual-axis steering" (DAS) system developed by Mercedes in 2020 was banned, starting from 2021. The DAS system allowed the driver to adjust the toe of the front wheels to optimise mechanical grip by pulling or pushing on the steering wheel. The FIA introduced newly revised wing load tests mid-season at the French Grand Prix to clamp down on potentially excessively flexing rear wings. This comes after Lewis Hamilton and his Mercedes team had claimed, at the Spanish Grand Prix, that the rear wing of the Red Bull RB16B flexed significantly at high speed and load, allowing greater top speeds. Under 2021 Formula One regulations wings must be immobile and rigidly attached to the bodywork.

From the Belgian Grand Prix onwards a new technical directive was enforced surrounding pit stop equipment after concerns teams were flouting the article 12.8.4 of Formula One technical regulations that state that pit equipment may only be filled with compressed air or nitrogen and that sensors on this equipment must 'act passively' to achieve quicker pit stop times and potentially meaning cars could be released in an unsafe condition. To help enforce this new tolerance parameters will be introduced of 0.15 seconds from when the tyres have been fitted and tightened to the dropping of the jack and 0.2 seconds from the dropping of the jack to a car being released by the pit crew. The change was originally supposed to come in for the Hungarian Grand Prix, but was postponed. In a further clarification the FIA will have the means of ensuring the new tolerance limits are adhered to by using an intelligent wheel gun.

=== Sporting regulations ===
It was originally proposed that teams would be required to allow a driver who had competed in fewer than two Grands Prix to replace one of their race drivers in a Friday practice session over the course of the season. Whilst these rules were intended to give a chance to more non-Formula One drivers to test a Formula One car, the wording of this rule meant that teams satisfy the requirement if one of their regular drivers was in their rookie season. Such rules were instead implemented for the 2022 season.

Following the Mercedes tyre error during the 2020 Sakhir Grand Prix, where George Russell was given front tyres allocated to Valtteri Bottas during a pit stop, the FIA had adjusted the rules on tyre usage; drivers using mixed compound sets or using sets allocated to another driver on their cars were permitted to complete two laps before the driver must pit to correct the error before facing a penalty. Under the previous rules, drivers could be disqualified as soon as such error had occurred. The race time limit for red-flagged races was also reduced from four hours to three hours. From the 2021 United States Grand Prix, lap times set under double waved yellow flags were automatically deleted.

=== Race weekend changes ===
For the 2021 season, the schedule of a race weekend was revised. Under the pre-existing regulations, a race weekend spanned four days, with the Thursday before the race being reserved for media and promotional events and scrutineering; however, under the new regulations all of Thursday's events were moved to the Friday morning, with the times between activities on that day being reduced. Cars were under parc fermé conditions following the end of free practice three instead of qualifying, further restricting teams and drivers from making major changes to setups ahead of the race. The length of the two Friday practice sessions were cut from 90 minutes (as had been the case since the 2007 season) to 60 minutes. The 2021 W Series for female drivers was added to the list of support racing series alongside Formula 2, Formula 3, and Porsche Supercup. The 2021 W Series season started at the Red Bull Ring, where it was a support event for the Styrian Grand Prix in late June. It ended in late October at the Mexico City Grand Prix. Formula 2 and Formula 3 supported Formula One on alternate weekends, rather than the same ones as a cost saving measure.

There was a trial of sprint qualifying at the British, Italian, and São Paulo Grands Prix. Qualifying for these sprints took place on Friday afternoon in place of the normal second practice session and the sprints ran over the least number of laps to exceed 100 km (62 mi), approximately one third of a normal race distance. The result of the sprint race determined the starting grid for the main race. Three points were awarded to the winner of the sprint race, two points to the runner-up, and one point to the third-placed finisher; sprint races were set to be expanded for the 2022 season. The British Grand Prix timetable for 16–18 July revealed that there would be no running for Formula One cars until 14:30 local time on Friday with the normal Qualifying starting at 18:00. Normally, the second practice session would have been at around 14:00, with no running in the evening. A second practice session is due to start at 12:00 on Saturday, before the Sprint Qualifying at 16:30. The main race is due to start at 15:00 on Sunday. At events with Sprint Qualifying, the parc fermé was now brought forward to Friday after normal Qualifying, which saw drivers only allowed to use the softest available tyre with the usual requirement for the top 10 to start on the tyres they used for their best lap in Q2 removed for events including Sprint Qualifying in their schedule. There is also no requirement to make a pit stop during Sprint Qualifying, and all 20 drivers at events where Sprint Qualifying takes place were given free tyre choice ahead of Sunday's Grand Prix. Teams were given a $500,000 overall grant by the FIA to cover the cost of the scheduled three sprint races.

== Season summary ==
=== Pre-season ===
Winter testing switched from the Circuit de Barcelona-Catalunya in Montmeló to the Bahrain International Circuit in Sakhir, with three days of running beginning on 12 March. Formula One declined an offer from Bahrain to provide COVID-19 vaccines for all personnel attending pre-season testing and the season's opening Grand Prix. However, several teams and drivers opted to accept the Bahrain government's offer.

=== Opening rounds ===
Max Verstappen took pole position on the opening round in Bahrain. On the formation lap, Sergio Pérez stalled at the last turn and was relegated to start in the pit lane, leaving his 11th place spot vacant. On the first lap, Nikita Mazepin spun at turn 3, crashing into the barrier and calling out the safety car. AlphaTauri's Pierre Gasly collided with Daniel Ricciardo's McLaren the lap after the safety car ended, while Mick Schumacher spun off behind the pack. Lewis Hamilton got past Verstappen on lap 40, but on lap 53 Verstappen overtook Hamilton at turn 4, before being ordered to give the place back because he exceeded track limits. In the end, Hamilton won from Verstappen, and Valtteri Bottas completed the podium. Lando Norris finished in fourth and Pérez, after starting from last, recovered to fifth.

At the Emilia Romagna Grand Prix, Hamilton took pole from Pérez and Verstappen. Verstappen went into the lead at turn 1 on lap 1, after it started raining on race day. Mazepin and Nicholas Latifi crashed at the exit of turn 13, bringing out the safety car. Under the safety car, Schumacher lost control of his car and spun into the pit exit, losing his front wing. On lap 31, at turn 7, Hamilton made a mistake, hitting the wall and damaging his front wing. After approximately a minute in the gravel, he rejoined. The moment he did, his teammate Bottas and George Russell had a crash at over 320 km/h (200 mph) on the start-finish straight, bringing out the red flag. After the race restarted, Norris overtook Charles Leclerc for second, but the former was overtaken by Hamilton, resulting in a podium of Verstappen, Hamilton and Norris.

Bottas took pole at the Portuguese Grand Prix. He kept his lead from Hamilton and Verstappen. On lap 2, Kimi Räikkönen made contact with his teammate, Antonio Giovinazzi, and was forced into retirement, while Giovinazzi could continue. Hamilton eventually overtook Bottas and won with Verstappen in second and Bottas in third. Pérez and Norris came fourth and fifth, respectively. Verstappen took the fastest lap on the last lap but was soon deleted, due to track limits, meaning Bottas was given the fastest lap point.

Hamilton took his 100th pole position in Spain. On lap 1, Verstappen overtook him at the first turn. Five laps later, Yuki Tsunoda pulled over at the reprofiled turn 10, marking his first Formula One retirement. Hamilton took the lead after Verstappen pitted on lap 23, but Verstappen took it back on lap 28. However, a slow stop and a decision to stay out until lap 59 let Hamilton into the lead until the checkered flag, Verstappen ended up second with Bottas in third place from Leclerc and Pérez.

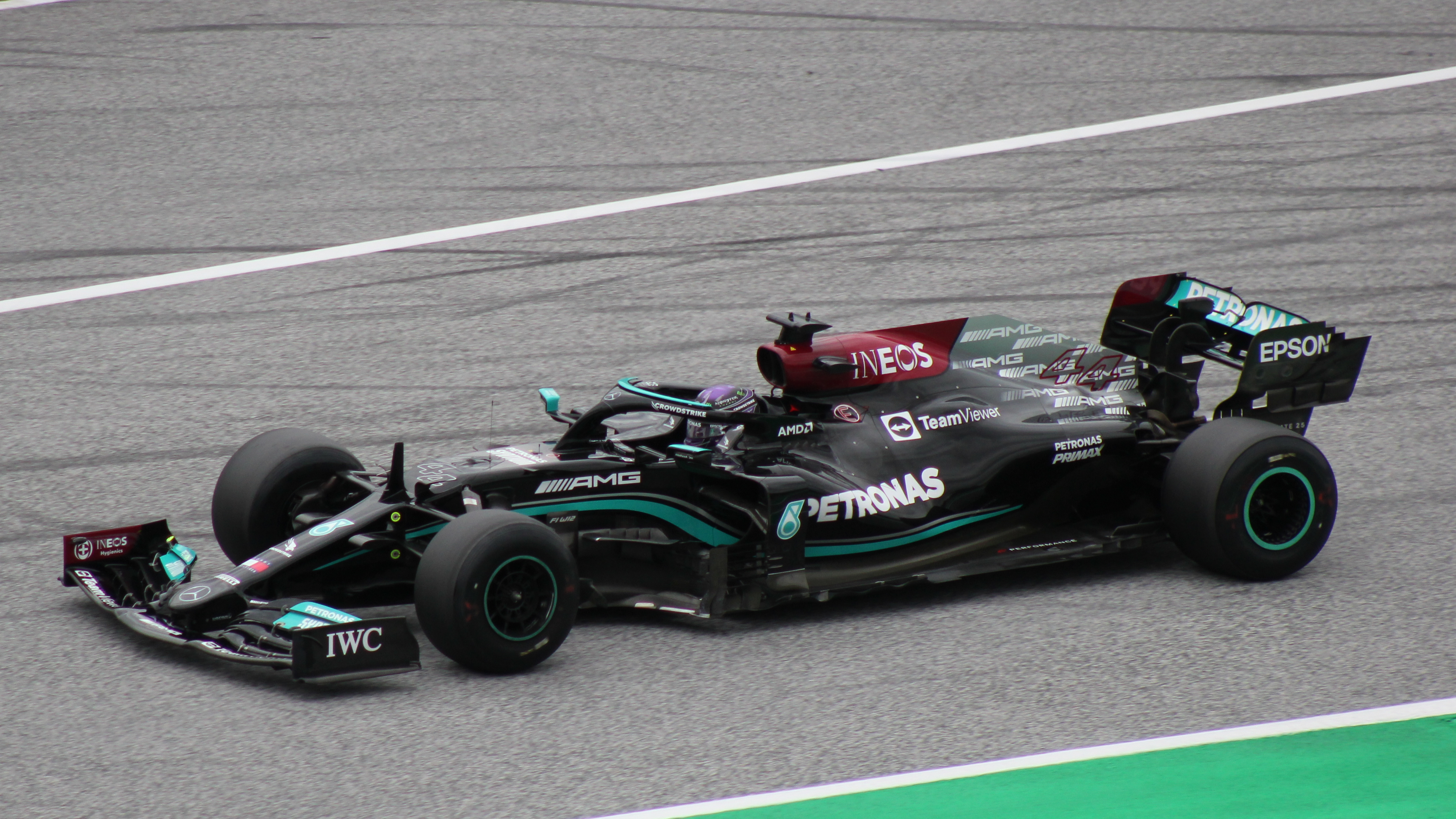
Lewis Hamilton became the first F1 driver to reach 100 pole positions at the Spanish Grand Prix, and at the Russian Grand Prix he also became first to achieve 100 race wins.

Leclerc took pole at the Monaco Grand Prix despite crashing in the final minutes. The crash caused a driveshaft failure, meaning he was unable to start the race. Verstappen started at the front and led from Bottas and Carlos Sainz Jr. On lap 30, Bottas was forced into retirement after his front-right tyre would not come off during a routine pitstop. Verstappen took the victory, as well as the championship lead for the first time in his career; Red Bull came away from this race with a one-point lead in the Constructors' Championship. Behind Verstappen, Sainz took his first podium for Ferrari, and Norris took his second podium of the season in third place.

Leclerc took pole again in Azerbaijan, this time he was able to start the race. He led for one lap before Hamilton got past on lap 2 at turn 1. Hamilton was held up in his pitstop to allow Gasly to pass him in the pitlane, handing Verstappen the net race lead. On lap 30, Lance Stroll crashed out due to a tyre failure and brought out the safety car. With Verstappen comfortably leading with six laps to go, he suffered a tyre failure, causing him to crash on the pit straight, bringing out the safety car and then the red flag on lap 46 and 48, respectively. The race was restarted with two laps of racing left. Hamilton went up the inside of Pérez at the restart, but forgot to adjust his brake bias and missed the corner. Pérez won for the second time in his career and took his first win for Red Bull. Sebastian Vettel took Aston Martin's first podium in Formula One, while Gasly took his third career podium.

In France, Verstappen got his second pole of the season, only to go wide at the first turn and lose the lead to Hamilton in the first lap. After regaining first with an undercut in his first pit stop, Verstappen found himself under heavy pressure from both Mercedes drivers. Verstappen relinquished his lead to pit a second time, one of two drivers to do so, returning to the track 18 seconds behind Hamilton. The speed advantage allowed him to make up the lost time, overtaking Bottas on lap 44 and Hamilton on the penultimate lap, for his third win of the year and his thirteenth win overall. Hamilton, now 12 points behind in the Drivers' Championship, did secure second, and with an overtake on lap 49, Pérez managed to take third place, pushing Bottas to fourth. It was the first race of the season where the race winner also took pole position and the fastest lap, and the first race of the season with no retirements. Red Bull extended their lead over Mercedes in the Constructors' Championship to 37 points after the race.

=== Mid-season rounds ===
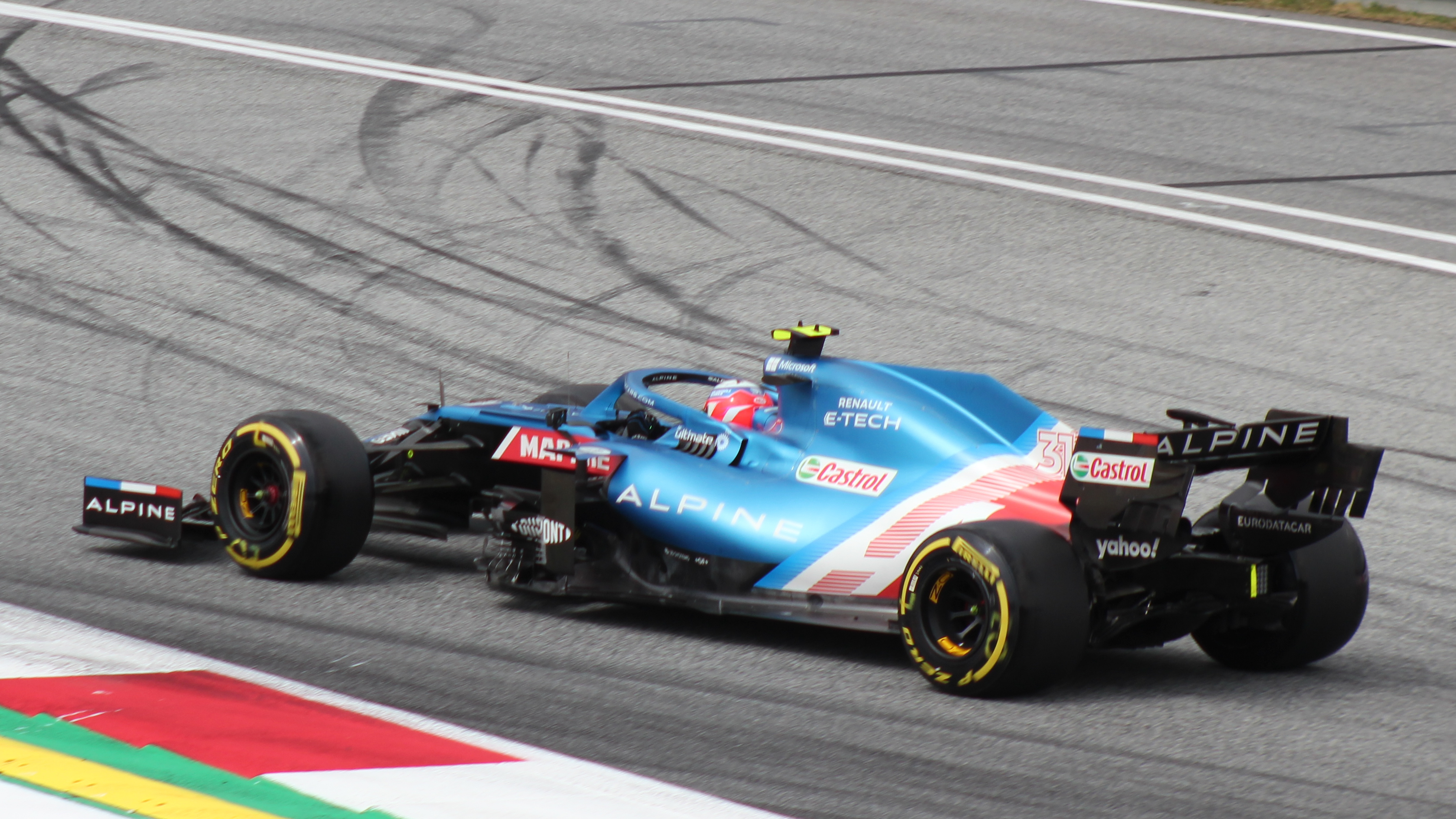
At the Hungarian Grand Prix, Esteban Ocon took his and Alpine's first F1 victory after eventually taking the lead starting from eighth when multiple cars collided at the first turn of the opening lap.

Max Verstappen took his third season pole at the Styrian Grand Prix, the first of two back-to-back races at the Red Bull Ring. On the first lap, three cars collided at the third turn, forcing Pierre Gasly out of the race. Verstappen won from Lewis Hamilton, meaning Verstappen extended his title lead to 18 points. Valtteri Bottas came third, taking his first podium since Spain. Verstappen took pole at the Austrian Grand Prix, the last race of the first triple header. On the first lap, Esteban Ocon retired with broken suspension. Lando Norris received a penalty after being judged to have forced Sergio Pérez off track. Pérez later received two penalties for doing the same to Charles Leclerc. Verstappen won the race from Bottas and Norris. Hamilton finished fourth, after picking up damage to the underside of his car, meaning that Verstappen was able to extend his championship lead to 32 points.

Hamilton was fastest in qualifying to start in first place for the first ever sprint in the British Grand Prix. In the sprint, Verstappen made a better start than Hamilton and overtook him before the first corner, leading every lap and winning the sprint with Hamilton second and Bottas third, thus Verstappen started on pole for the Grand Prix itself. On lap five of the sprint, Pérez spun, dropping him to the back of the field, and later retiring, forcing him to start from the pits for the race. On the first lap of the Grand Prix, Verstappen and Hamilton collided at approximately 290 kilometres per hour (180 mph) at Copse corner. Hamilton made contact with Verstappen's right rear wheel, causing the tyre to come off and Verstappen travelled into the barrier, causing the race to be stopped temporarily. Hamilton was penalised for the contact with a ten-second penalty, which he served during his pit stop. Leclerc led most of the Grand Prix, but finished second after Hamilton overtook Norris, Bottas, and Leclerc in the late stages to win the race. Hamilton reduced his gap to Verstappen from 33 points to eight points.

Hamilton was again fastest in qualifying to take pole in the Hungarian Grand Prix. Rainy conditions at the start of the race led to Bottas misjudging his braking and sliding into the back of Norris; this escalated into multiple collisions which eventually eliminated five drivers: Bottas, Norris (who only retired on lap 3), Pérez, Lance Stroll and Leclerc. Due to the large amount of debris on the track, the race was red-flagged; at this stage, Hamilton led from Ocon and Sebastian Vettel, with championship leader Verstappen, having acquired damage on the opening lap, in 13th. Hamilton was the only driver who did not choose to pit for slick tyres at the end of the formation lap, leaving him the only driver on the grid for the restart; this saw him drop to last when he pitted on the next lap. In the pits, Kimi Räikkönen was released into Nikita Mazepin's path, putting Mazepin out of the race. The newly promoted Ocon held his lead until the end to take his first Formula 1 victory, finishing ahead of Vettel, and Hamilton, who had battled his way back up the classification, and Carlos Sainz Jr. Vettel was later disqualified for a fuel sample issue, promoting Hamilton to second and Sainz to third. Hamilton's recovery drive saw him retake the championship lead over Verstappen by eight points, while Mercedes also regained their advantage over Red Bull in the Constructors' standings by twelve points. Meanwhile, Nicholas Latifi and George Russell were classified seventh and eighth, taking Williams's first points since 2019.

Verstappen took pole from Russell and Hamilton in the Belgian Grand Prix in a wet qualifying session. The race was heavily affected by rain, which initially saw the start delayed by 25 minutes. After two formation laps behind the safety car, the race start was suspended and red-flagged due to poor conditions and lack of visibility. A nearly three-hour delay followed before the race was resumed. After a further three laps, the race was red-flagged again. It was not restarted, becoming the shortest race in Formula 1 history and the sixth to award half-points as less than 75% of the race was completed. Verstappen won by default, with Russell in second and Hamilton in third place. It was Russell's first podium in Formula 1. As a result, Hamilton's lead in the championship was cut to three points from Verstappen.

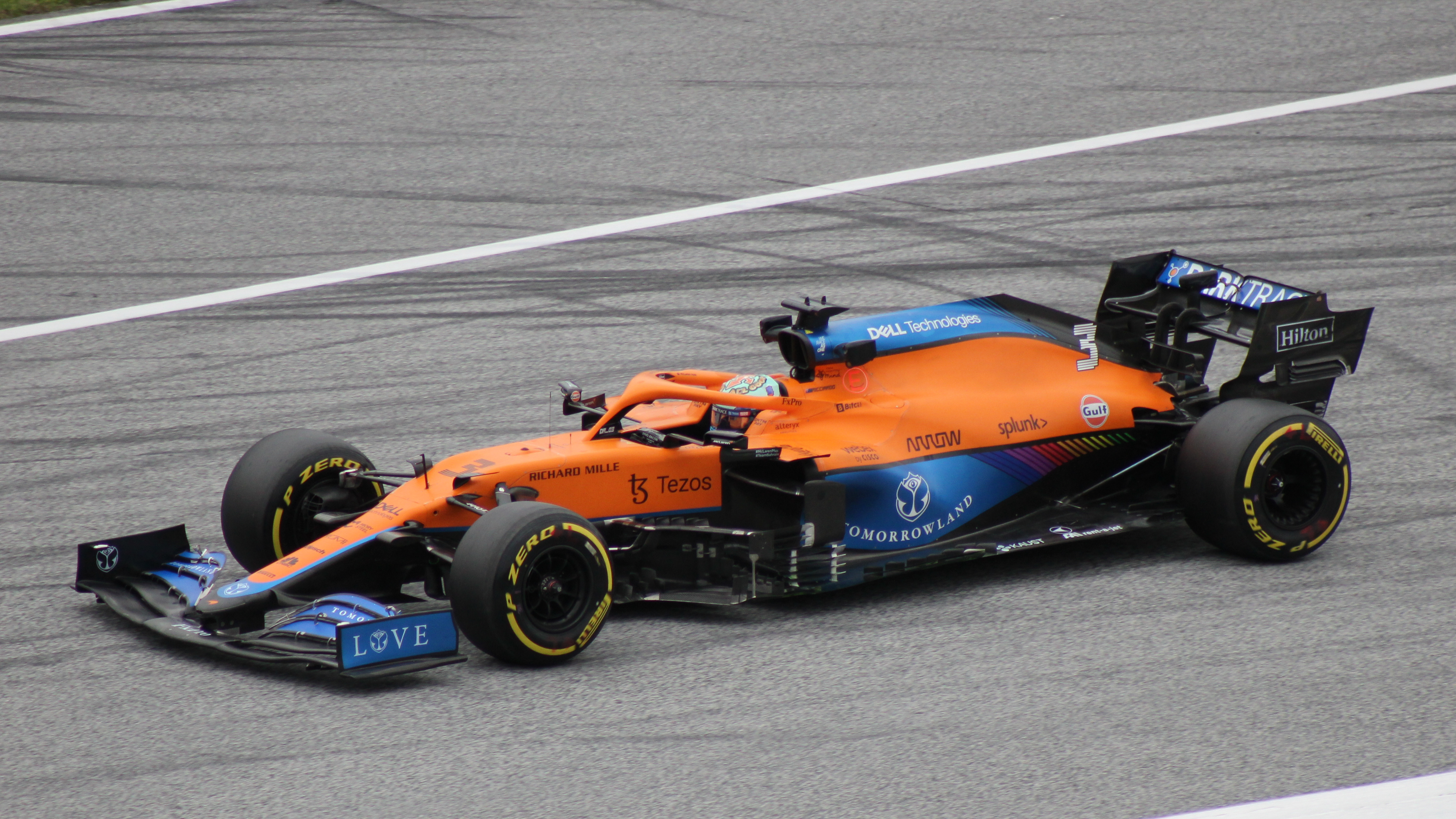
Daniel Ricciardo's victory at the Italian Grand Prix was the first Grand Prix victory for McLaren since 2012, and with Lando Norris their first 1–2 finish since 2010.

Verstappen would again take pole at the first Dutch Grand Prix to take place since 1985 at Zandvoort. He held his lead from Hamilton to take the win at his home race, taking over the lead of the championship by three points. Bottas came third, overtaking Norris, who finished tenth, in the standings for third place. Bottas won sprint qualifying at the Italian Grand Prix, but was forced to start from the back of the grid after exceeding the quota of one on his power units' components. Verstappen started at the front with the McLarens second and third. Daniel Ricciardo took the lead on lap 1. A slow stop for Verstappen meant that he ended up alongside Hamilton after the latter made his pitstop. Hamilton and Verstappen collided, ending their races prematurely. Ricciardo led to the end to take his first victory since the 2018 Monaco Grand Prix and McLaren's first victory since the 2012 Brazilian Grand Prix. His teammate Norris finished a career-best second place, whilst Bottas came third from the back of the grid after a penalty was applied to Pérez. After the race, Verstappen was penalised by the stewards for being predominantly at fault for the collision with Hamilton; he was given a 3-place grid-penalty for the next race and two penalty points on his super licence.

Verstappen was required to start from the back at the Russian Grand Prix for exceeding his quota of a number of his power unit components. Norris took his first career pole position, from Sainz (his best qualifying result), and Russell. The running order changed substantially as heavy rain began to fall in the closing laps. Hamilton took his 100th Formula One victory as well as the championship lead, ahead of Verstappen and Sainz.

=== Closing rounds ===
Lewis Hamilton was the fastest in qualifying in Turkey, but was dropped down the grid because of a penalty due to a power unit component change. Valtteri Bottas was promoted to pole position and won the race, his first of 2021. He was followed by Max Verstappen, who re-took the championship lead, and Sergio Pérez, who took his first podium since France. Verstappen continued his momentum in the United States Grand Prix, taking pole position. Despite Hamilton taking the lead in turn 1, Verstappen was able to win the race with Hamilton in second place, in front of Pérez. The result increased Verstappen's lead to 12 points as Hamilton collected an extra Championship point by setting the fastest lap. Bottas took pole in Mexico City, but was spun around at the first corner by Daniel Ricciardo. Another incident behind involving Yuki Tsunoda and Mick Schumacher took both drivers out of the race, calling out the safety car. Verstappen took his second win in a row, increasing his lead from Hamilton in second, and Pérez took the final spot on the podium in his home race.

Hamilton was fastest in qualifying in Brazil, but was disqualified the following day for a technical infringement. Bottas won the qualifying sprint, giving him pole position for the Grand Prix. By finishing second in the sprint, Verstappen increased his championship lead over Hamilton by two points, and Carlos Sainz Jr., who finished third, increased Ferrari's championship lead over McLaren. Hamilton finished fifth in the sprint from last on the grid, but a five-place grid drop due to taking a new engine relegated him to tenth on the grid for the Grand Prix. On race day, both Verstappen and Pérez were able to overtake Bottas on the first lap. Meanwhile, Lando Norris and Sainz were involved in a separate incident, with Norris getting a puncture. On lap 48, Hamilton caught up to Verstappen and attempted an overtake, but failed and resulted in both of them going off track. Hamilton tried again on lap 59 and got past. He won the race from Verstappen, decreasing Verstappen's championship lead from 21 points to 14 points, while Bottas completed the podium.

Hamilton took pole position in Qatar, while a penalty for failing to respect double waived yellow flags during qualifying forced Verstappen to start from seventh. Hamilton took the win, leading every lap of the race. Verstappen quickly recovered to second place but was unable to threaten Hamilton's race lead despite setting the fastest lap on the last lap of the race. Fernando Alonso used a one-stop strategy to finish third, less than three seconds ahead of Peréz in fourth, it was Alonso's first podium since the 2014 Hungarian Grand Prix. Bottas and Nicholas Latifi retired from the race after they and multiple others suffered punctures on track. The result reduced Verstappen's lead in the Driver's Championship to eight points while Mercedes's lead in the Constructors' Championship was reduced to five points.

Hamilton took pole position again in the inaugural Saudi Arabian Grand Prix ahead of Bottas and Verstappen, who crashed at the last corner of his final qualifying lap. The race played host to several incidents which saw the retirements of Schumacher, Pérez, George Russell, Nikita Mazepin, and Sebastian Vettel, with Hamilton, Verstappen, Tsunoda, and Kimi Räikkönen also being involved in collisions during the race. Hamilton won the race from Verstappen, while Bottas overtook Esteban Ocon at the final corner to take third place. The results left Hamilton and Verstappen on equal points in the Drivers' Championship going into the final round in Abu Dhabi, while Mercedes extended their lead in the Constructors Championship to 28 points.

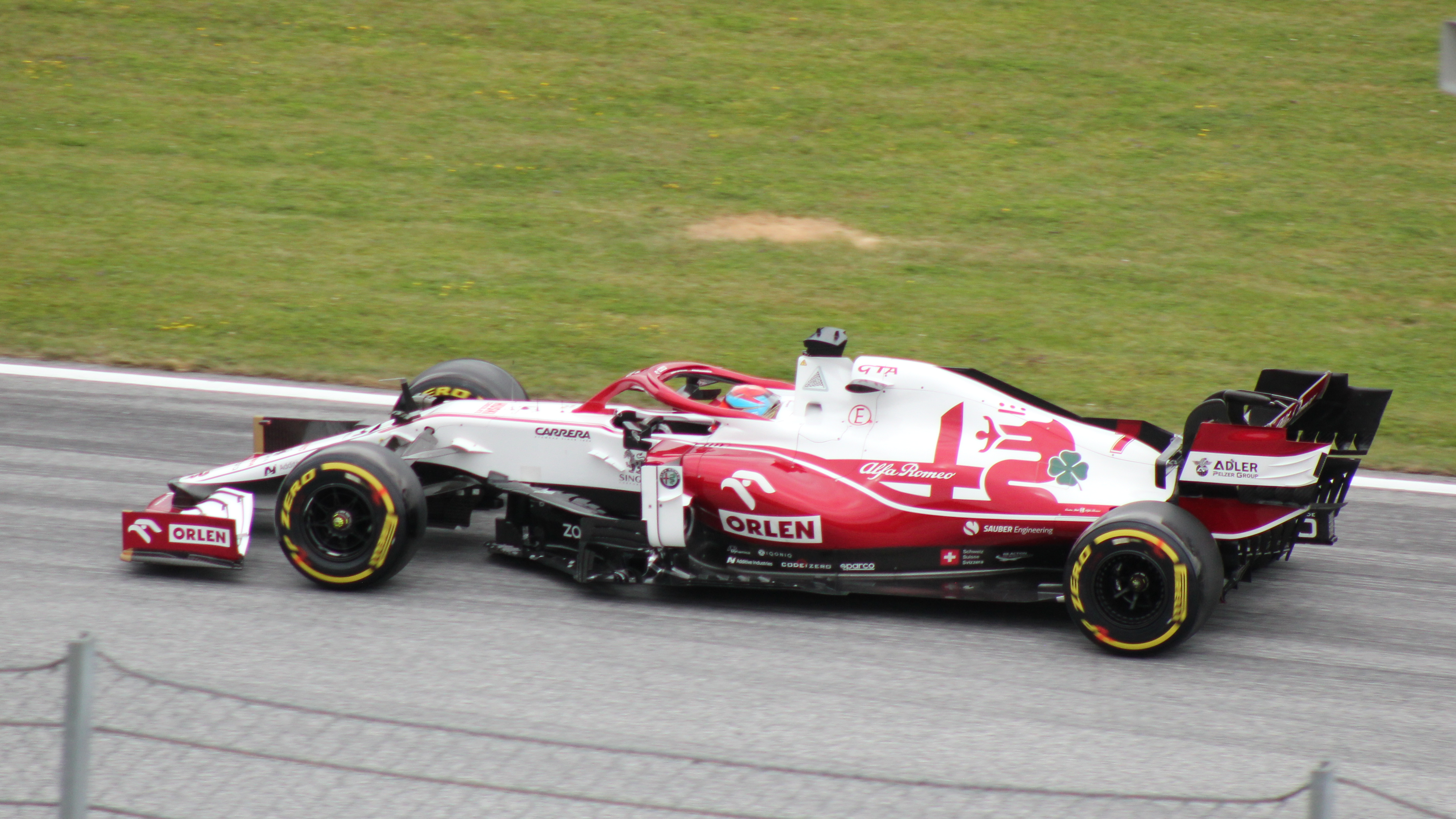
In his 19th year competing in F1 Kimi Räikkönen, driving for Alfa Romeo, retired after the season.

=== Season finale and controversy ===
Verstappen took the pole position in Abu Dhabi ahead of Hamilton and Norris. During the race, Hamilton had a better start and took the lead into the first turn. At turn six Verstappen attempted to pass, forcing Hamilton to evade by going off the track. Emerging from the corner still in the lead, Hamilton was instructed to give up the advantage he had gained. The pair settled in their positions until the first round of pit stops, with Hamilton gradually extending his lead. He later lost much of his advantage when Pérez, Verstappen's teammate with Red Bull, and who had yet to make a pit stop, made it difficult for Hamilton to pass him, though Verstappen was unable to capitalise. Later, a virtual safety car period allowed Verstappen to change his tyres without losing track position, which was an attempt to catch Hamilton with fresher tyres. With seven laps remaining, the safety car was brought out for a crash involving Latifi, and Red Bull used the opportunity to give Verstappen a fresh set of soft tyres, while Hamilton, still on his now-quite-old hard compound tyres, was not pitted. Race director Michael Masi took the decision to allow only the five lapped cars between Hamilton and Verstappen to unlap themselves before restarting the race with only one lap remaining. Upon the restart, Verstappen quickly passed Hamilton and held him off for the remainder of the lap to win the race and the championship.

Mercedes lodged two separate protests against the race's result. Both protests were dismissed, (Note: Mercedes protested the result of the race on two counts: (i) for Verstappen overtaking under the safety car contrary to Article 48.8 of the Formula One sporting regulations, and (ii) that they believed the race director did not follow the correct procedure under Article 48.12 by only allowing the cars between Verstappen and Hamilton to unlap themselves before the restart at the end of lap 57, despite initially rejecting requests from Red Bull to do so. The first count was dismissed as the stewards ruled that Verstappen being momentarily ahead of Hamilton's during the safety car restart procedure did not constitute an overtake. As for the second count, the stewards ruled that although Article 48.12 was not applied in full, Red Bull's argument that Article 48.13 and Article 15.3 overrode that rule was correct, and that deleting the last lap would "effectively [shorten] the race retrospectively" and was inappropriate.) and Mercedes announced their intention to appeal the dismissal of the protest regarding the handling of the restart following the safety car period.

A statement from the FIA acknowledged the controversy, and that it was "tarnishing the image of the championship and the due celebration". The statement was made after a meeting of the FIA World Motor Sport Council, which was scheduled for 15 December 2021, and was described as "extending an olive branch to Mercedes". On 16 December 2021, Mercedes announced that it had withdrawn its challenge to the race result. (Note: Before renouncing their appeal, commentary from a lawyer in The Guardian suggested that Mercedes would be in a strong position to mount legal action, although they noted the conflict between Mercedes wishing to stress sporting integrity versus the increasing commercialisation of the sport. Another lawyer later confirmed this view that Mercedes has a "good legal basis" for their protest.) In addition, Hamilton boycotted the end of season FIA prize-giving ceremony, held on 16 December 2021, and at the time there were questions whether he would continue in F1. Hamilton was investigated for breaching the Sporting Regulations which state the top three drivers in the championship must attend the FIA Gala. Newly elected FIA president Mohammed Ben Sulayem stated in the immediate championship aftermath that there would be "no forgiveness" for Hamilton's failure to attend the event.

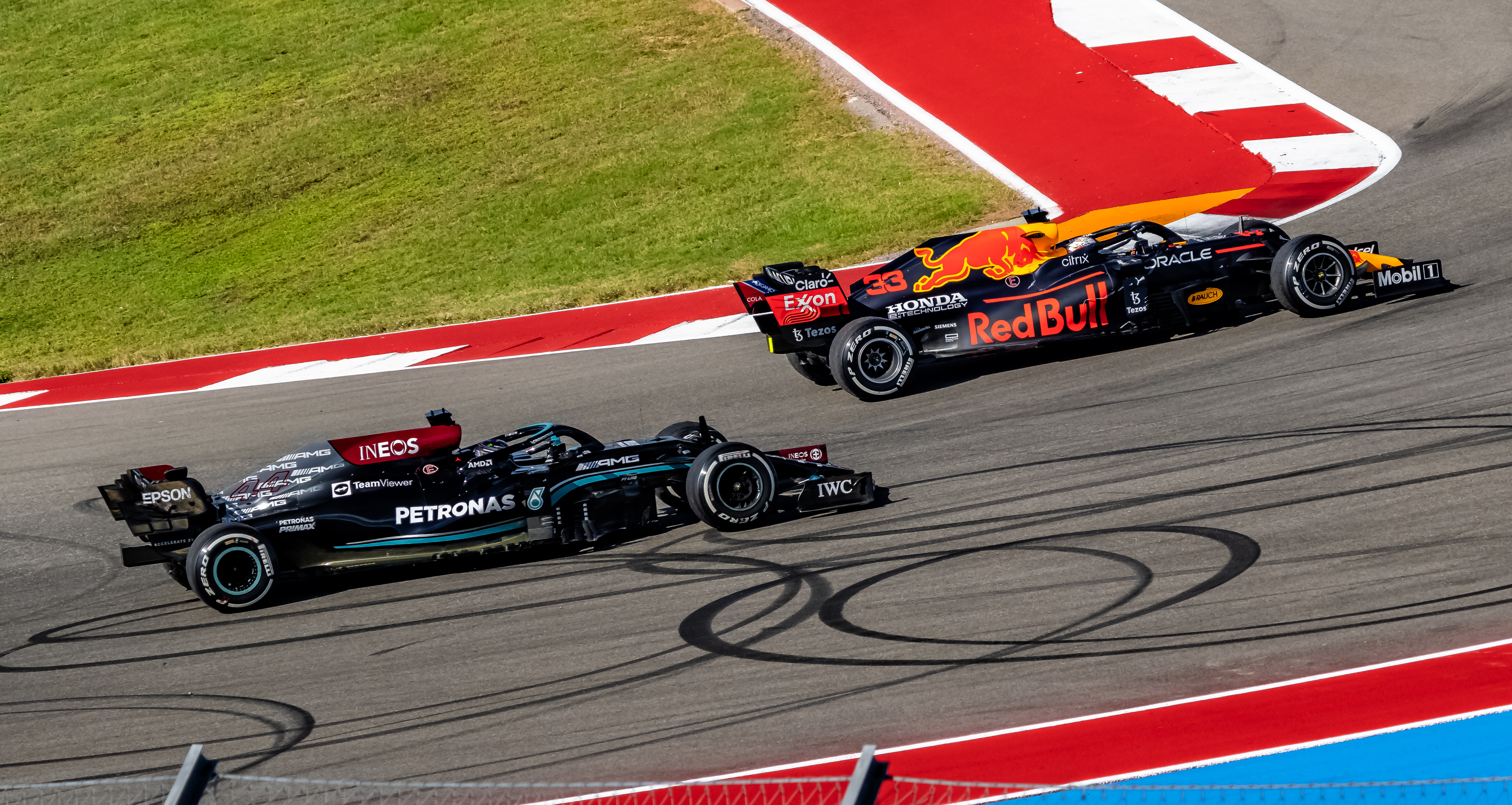
Max Verstappen (right) and Lewis Hamilton (left) together finished first and second (in either order) at 14 Grand Prix races across the 2021 season, including the United States Grand Prix (pictured).

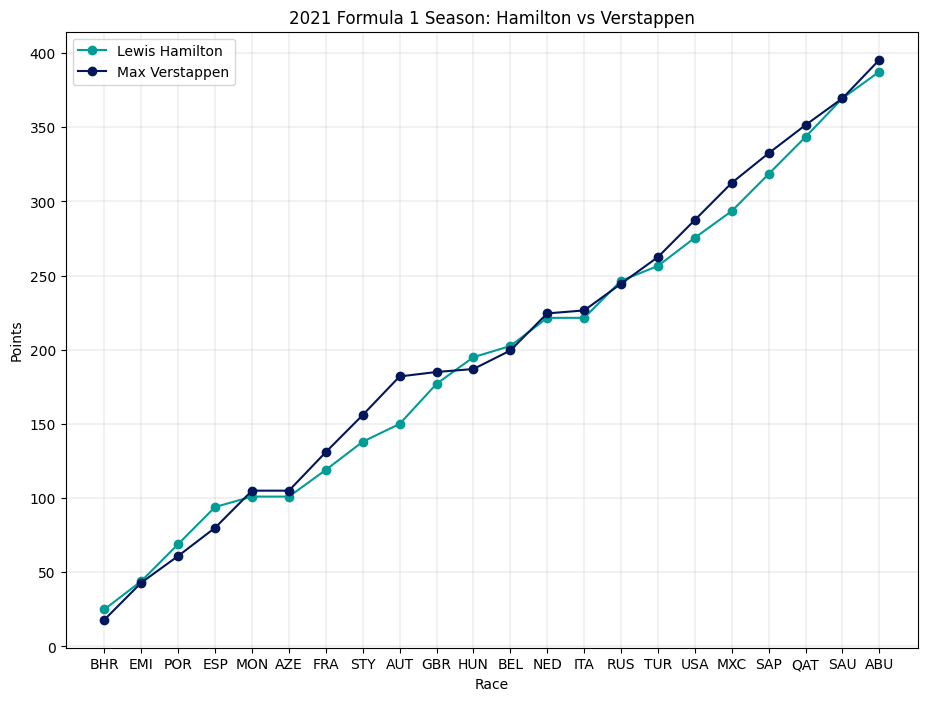
Hamilton and Verstappen frequently exchanged the championship lead throughout the 2021 season, and entered the final round equal on points

=== Post-season events ===
Following an FIA investigation and inquiry, Michael Masi was removed from his role as race director, being replaced by Niels Wittich and Eduardo Freitas, with Herbie Blash appointed as a permanent senior advisor alongside Wittich and Freitas.

On 10 March 2022 the FIA World Motor Sport Council report on the events of the final race of the season was announced, and that the "Race Director called the safety car back into the pit lane without it having completed an additional lap as required by the Formula 1 Sporting Regulations", however also noted that the "results of the 2021 Abu Dhabi Grand Prix and the FIA Formula One World Championship are valid, final and cannot now be changed". Hamilton himself revealed that he had been fined for failing to attend the FIA Prize Giving Gala asking for the governing body to donate the proceeds to underprivileged children who want to get involved in motorsport.

=== Financial breaches ===
In October 2022, the FIA published their review of the teams' budgets for 2021. Red Bull Racing had committed a minor financial breach (defined as less than 5% over budget) of £1,864,000. Additionally, both Aston Martin and Red Bull were found to have made procedural breaches. Red Bull were punished with a US$7,000,000 and a 10% reduction in wind tunnel testing time for period of one year, while Aston Martin were fined US$450,000. Opinion on the outcome amongst F1 team personnel was divided, with Red Bull team principal Christian Horner "begrudgingly" accepting what he deemed to be a "draconian" punishment, stating that the loss of wind tunnel time could cost them between 0.25 and 0.5 seconds a lap in performance. Alpine's Otmar Szafnauer and Mercedes' Toto Wolff felt the FIA's decision was fair, with the latter stating that the "reputational damage" incurred by Red Bull would be enough to deter teams from breaching the cost cap in future. McLaren's Andreas Seidl, was less satisfied, saying that "the penalty doesn't fit the breach" and hoping for "stricter" penalties for future circumventions of the rules.

== Results and standings ==
=== Grands Prix ===
Round	Grand Prix (Note: The British, Italian and São Paulo Grands Prix featured the sprint qualifying format.)	Pole position (Note: Pole position for the British, Italian and São Paulo Grands Prix was determined by the result of the sprint qualifying format.)	Fastest lap	Winning driver	Winning constructor	Report
1	Bahrain Grand Prix	(Netherlands) Max Verstappen	(Finland) Valtteri Bottas	(United Kingdom) Lewis Hamilton	(Germany) Mercedes	Report
2	(Italy) Emilia Romagna Grand Prix	(United Kingdom) Lewis Hamilton	(United Kingdom) Lewis Hamilton	(Netherlands) Max Verstappen	(Austria) Red Bull Racing-Honda	Report
3	(Portugal) Portuguese Grand Prix	(FIN) Valtteri Bottas	(Finland) Valtteri Bottas	(United Kingdom) Lewis Hamilton	(Germany) Mercedes	Report
4	(Spain) Spanish Grand Prix	(United Kingdom) Lewis Hamilton	(Netherlands) Max Verstappen	(United Kingdom) Lewis Hamilton	(Germany) Mercedes	Report
5	Monaco Grand Prix	(Monaco) Charles Leclerc (Note: Charles Leclerc set the fastest time in qualifying, but did not start the race. Pole position was left vacant on the grid. Max Verstappen, in the second slot, was the first driver on the grid. Leclerc is still considered to have held pole position.)	(United Kingdom) Lewis Hamilton	(Netherlands) Max Verstappen	(Austria) Red Bull Racing-Honda	Report
6	Azerbaijan Grand Prix	(Monaco) Charles Leclerc	(Netherlands) Max Verstappen	(Mexico) Sergio Pérez	(Austria) Red Bull Racing-Honda	Report
7	(France) French Grand Prix	(Netherlands) Max Verstappen	(Netherlands) Max Verstappen	(Netherlands) Max Verstappen	(Austria) Red Bull Racing-Honda	Report
8	(Austria) Styrian Grand Prix	(Netherlands) Max Verstappen	(United Kingdom) Lewis Hamilton	(Netherlands) Max Verstappen	(Austria) Red Bull Racing-Honda	Report
9	(Austria) Austrian Grand Prix	(Netherlands) Max Verstappen	(Netherlands) Max Verstappen	(Netherlands) Max Verstappen	(Austria) Red Bull Racing-Honda	Report
10	(United Kingdom) British Grand Prix	(Netherlands) Max Verstappen	(Mexico) Sergio Pérez	(United Kingdom) Lewis Hamilton	(Germany) Mercedes	Report
11	(Hungary) Hungarian Grand Prix	(United Kingdom) Lewis Hamilton	(France) Pierre Gasly	(France) Esteban Ocon	(France) Alpine-Renault	Report
12	(Belgium) Belgian Grand Prix	(Netherlands) Max Verstappen	None recognised	(Netherlands) Max Verstappen	(Austria) Red Bull Racing-Honda	Report
13	(Netherlands) Dutch Grand Prix	(Netherlands) Max Verstappen	(United Kingdom) Lewis Hamilton	(Netherlands) Max Verstappen	(Austria) Red Bull Racing-Honda	Report
14	(Italy) Italian Grand Prix	(Netherlands) Max Verstappen (Note: Valtteri Bottas finished first in sprint qualifying, but was required to start the race from the back of the grid for exceeding his quota of power unit elements. Max Verstappen was promoted to pole position in his place.)	(Australia) Daniel Ricciardo	(Australia) Daniel Ricciardo	(United Kingdom) McLaren-Mercedes	Report
15	(Russia) Russian Grand Prix	(United Kingdom) Lando Norris	(United Kingdom) Lando Norris	(United Kingdom) Lewis Hamilton	(Germany) Mercedes	Report
16	(Turkey) Turkish Grand Prix	(Finland) Valtteri Bottas (Note: Lewis Hamilton set the fastest time in qualifying, but received a ten-place grid penalty for exceeding his quota of internal combustion engines. Valtteri Bottas was promoted to pole position in his place.)	(Finland) Valtteri Bottas	(Finland) Valtteri Bottas	(Germany) Mercedes	Report
17	United States Grand Prix	(Netherlands) Max Verstappen	(United Kingdom) Lewis Hamilton	(Netherlands) Max Verstappen	(Austria) Red Bull Racing-Honda	Report
18	Mexico City Grand Prix	(Finland) Valtteri Bottas	(Finland) Valtteri Bottas	(Netherlands) Max Verstappen	(Austria) Red Bull Racing-Honda	Report
19	(Brazil) São Paulo Grand Prix	(Finland) Valtteri Bottas	(Mexico) Sergio Pérez	(United Kingdom) Lewis Hamilton	(Germany) Mercedes	Report
20	Qatar Grand Prix	(United Kingdom) Lewis Hamilton	(Netherlands) Max Verstappen	(United Kingdom) Lewis Hamilton	(Germany) Mercedes	Report
21	(Saudi Arabia) Saudi Arabian Grand Prix	(United Kingdom) Lewis Hamilton	(United Kingdom) Lewis Hamilton	(United Kingdom) Lewis Hamilton	(Germany) Mercedes	Report
22	(United Arab Emirates) Abu Dhabi Grand Prix	(Netherlands) Max Verstappen	(Netherlands) Max Verstappen	(Netherlands) Max Verstappen	(Austria) Red Bull Racing-Honda	Report

=== Scoring system ===
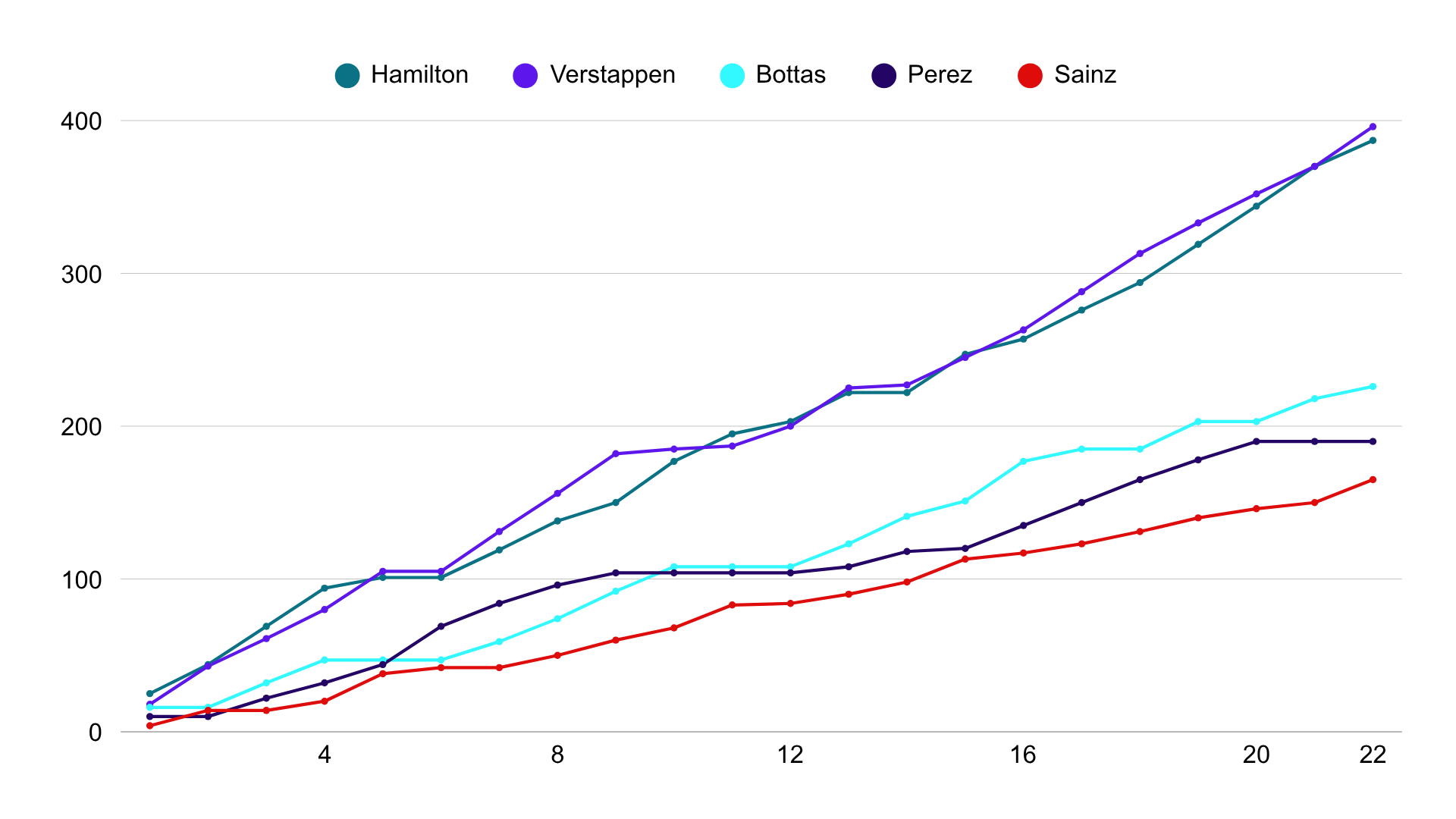
Cumulative points of the top five drivers

Points towards both titles were awarded to the top ten classified finishers at each event. In addition, one point was awarded to the driver who achieved the fastest lap time of the race and to the relevant constructor, provided the driver was in the top ten positions of the final race classification. At those events where a sprint qualifying session took place, points for both titles were awarded to the top three finishers in the final sprint qualifying session classification.

In the case of a tie on points a countback system was used where the driver with the most first places is ranked higher. If the number of first places was identical then the number of second places was considered, and so on. If this procedure failed to produce a result, the FIA nominated the winner according to such criteria as it thinks fit. The points were awarded for every race using the following system:

Position	1st	2nd	3rd	4th	5th	6th	7th	8th	9th	10th	FL
Race	25	18	15	12	10	8	6	4	2	1	1
Sprint qualifying	3	2	1								

=== World Drivers' Championship standings ===
Pos.	Driver	BHR (Bahrain)	EMI (Italy)	POR (Portugal)	ESP (Spain)	MON (Monaco)	AZE (Azerbaijan)	FRA (France)	STY (Austria)	AUT (Austria)	GBR (United Kingdom)	HUN (Hungary)	BEL* (Belgium)	NED (Netherlands)	ITA (Italy)	RUS (Russia)	TUR (Turkey)	USA (United States)	MXC (Mexico)	SAP (Brazil)	QAT (Qatar)	SAU (Saudi Arabia)	ABU (United Arab Emirates)	Points
1	(Netherlands) Max Verstappen	2^{P}	1	2	2^{F}	1	18†^{F}	1^{P}^{F}	1^{P}	1^{P}^{F}	Ret^{1 P}	9	1^{P}	1^{P}	Ret^{2 P}	2	2	1^{P}	1	2^{2}	2^{F}	2	1^{P}^{F}	395.5
2	(United Kingdom) Lewis Hamilton	1	2^{P}^{F}	1	1^{P}	7^{F}	15	2	2^{F}	4	1^{2}	2^{P}	3	2^{F}	Ret	1	5	2^{F}	2	1	1^{P}	1^{P}^{F}	2	387.5
3	(Finland) Valtteri Bottas	3^{F}	Ret	3^{P}^{F}	3	Ret	12	4	3	2	3^{3}	Ret	12	3	3^{1}	5	1^{P}^{F}	6	15^{P}^{F}	3^{1 P}	Ret	3	6	226
4	(Mexico) Sergio Pérez	5	11	4	5	4	1	3	4	6	16^{F}	Ret	19	8	5	9	3	3	3	4^{F}	4	Ret	15†	190
5	(Spain) Carlos Sainz Jr.	8	5	11	7	2	8	11	6	5	6	3	10	7	6	3	8	7	6	6^{3}	7	8	3	164.5
6	(United Kingdom) Lando Norris	4	3	5	8	3	5	5	5	3	4	Ret	14	10	2	7^{P}^{F}	7	8	10	10	9	10	7	160
7	(Monaco) Charles Leclerc	6	4	6	4	DNS^{P}	4^{P}	16	7	8	2	Ret	8	5	4	15	4	4	5	5	8	7	10	159
8	(Australia) Daniel Ricciardo	7	6	9	6	12	9	6	13	7	5	11	4	11	1^{F 3}	4	13	5	12	Ret	12	5	12	115
9	(France) Pierre Gasly	17†	7	10	10	6	3	7	Ret	9	11	5^{F}	6	4	Ret	13	6	Ret	4	7	11	6	5	110
10	(Spain) Fernando Alonso	Ret	10	8	17	13	6	8	9	10	7	4	11	6	8	6	16	Ret	9	9	3	13	8	81
11	(France) Esteban Ocon	13	9	7	9	9	Ret	14	14	Ret	9	1	7	9	10	14	10	Ret	13	8	5	4	9	74
12	(Germany) Sebastian Vettel	15	15†	13	13	5	2	9	12	17†	Ret	DSQ	5	13	12	12	18	10	7	11	10	Ret	11	43
13	(Canada) Lance Stroll	10	8	14	11	8	Ret	10	8	13	8	Ret	20	12	7	11	9	12	14	Ret	6	11	13	34
14	(Japan) Yuki Tsunoda	9	12	15	Ret	16	7	13	10	12	10	6	15	Ret	DNS	17	14	9	Ret	15	13	14	4	32
15	(United Kingdom) George Russell	14	Ret	16	14	14	17†	12	Ret	11	12	8	2	17†	9	10	15	14	16	13	17	Ret	Ret	16
16	(Finland) Kimi Räikkönen	11	13	Ret	12	11	10	17	11	15	15	10	18	WD		8	12	13	8	12	14	15	Ret	10
17	(Canada) Nicholas Latifi	18†	Ret	18	16	15	16	18	17	16	14	7	9	16	11	19†	17	15	17	16	Ret	12	Ret	7
18	(Italy) Antonio Giovinazzi	12	14	12	15	10	11	15	15	14	13	13	13	14	13	16	11	11	11	14	15	9	Ret	3
19	(Germany) Mick Schumacher	16	16	17	18	18	13	19	16	18	18	12	16	18	15	Ret	19	16	Ret	18	16	Ret	14	0
20	(Poland) Robert Kubica													15	14									0
21	(Russian Automobile Federation) Nikita Mazepin	Ret	17	19	19	17	14	20	18	19	17	Ret	17	Ret	Ret	18	20	17	18	17	18	Ret	WD	0
Pos.	Driver	BHR (Bahrain)	EMI (Italy)	POR (Portugal)	ESP (Spain)	MON (Monaco)	AZE (Azerbaijan)	FRA (France)	STY (Austria)	AUT (Austria)	GBR (United Kingdom)	HUN (Hungary)	BEL* (Belgium)	NED (Netherlands)	ITA (Italy)	RUS (Russia)	TUR (Turkey)	USA (United States)	MXC (Mexico)	SAP (Brazil)	QAT (Qatar)	SAU (Saudi Arabia)	ABU (United Arab Emirates)	Points

Key
Colour	Result
Gold	Winner
Silver	2nd place
Bronze	3rd place
Green	Other points position
Blue	Other classified position
Blue	Not classified, finished (NC)
Purple	Not classified, retired (Ret)
Red	Did not qualify (DNQ)
Red	Did not pre-qualify (DNPQ)
Black	Disqualified (DSQ)
White	Did not start (DNS)
White	Race cancelled (C)
Blank	Did not practice (DNP)
Blank	Excluded (EX)
Blank	Did not arrive (DNA)
Blank	Withdrawn (WD)
Annotation	Meaning
Superscript number	Points-scoring position in sprint qualifying
P	Pole position
F	Fastest lap

Notes:

- † – Driver did not finish the Grand Prix but was classified, as he completed more than 90% of the race distance.
- * – Half points were awarded at the Belgian Grand Prix as less than 75% of the scheduled distance was completed. Fastest laps were not recognised in the final classification.

=== World Constructors' Championship standings ===
Pos.	Constructor	BHR (Bahrain)	EMI (Italy)	POR (Portugal)	ESP (Spain)	MON (Monaco)	AZE (Azerbaijan)	FRA (France)	STY (Austria)	AUT (Austria)	GBR (United Kingdom)	HUN (Hungary)	BEL* (Belgium)	NED (Netherlands)	ITA (Italy)	RUS (Russia)	TUR (Turkey)	USA (United States)	MXC (Mexico)	SAP (Brazil)	QAT (Qatar)	SAU (Saudi Arabia)	ABU (United Arab Emirates)	Points
1	(Germany) Mercedes	1	2^{P}^{F}	1	1^{P}	7^{F}	12	2	2^{F}	2	1^{2}	2^{P}	3	2^{F}	3^{1}	1	1^{P}^{F}	2^{F}	2	1	1^{P}	1^{P}^{F}	2	613.5
1	(Germany) Mercedes	3^{F}	Ret	3^{P}^{F}	3	Ret	15	4	3	4	3^{3}	Ret	12	3	Ret	5	5	6	15^{P}^{F}	3^{1 P}	Ret	3	6	613.5
2	(Austria) Red Bull Racing-Honda	2^{P}	1	2	2^{F}	1	1	1^{P}^{F}	1^{P}	1^{P}^{F}	16^{F}	9	1^{P}	1^{P}	5	2	2	1^{P}	1	2^{2}	2^{F}	2	1^{P}^{F}	585.5
2	(Austria) Red Bull Racing-Honda	5	11	4	5	4	18†^{F}	3	4	6	Ret^{1 P}	Ret	19	8	Ret^{2 P}	9	3	3	3	4^{F}	4	Ret	15†	585.5
3	(Italy) Ferrari	6	4	6	4	2	4^{P}	11	6	5	2	3	8	5	4	3	4	4	5	5	7	7	3	323.5
3	(Italy) Ferrari	8	5	11	7	DNS^{P}	8	16	7	8	6	Ret	10	7	6	15	8	7	6	6^{3}	8	8	10	323.5
4	(United Kingdom) McLaren-Mercedes	4	3	5	6	3	5	5	5	3	4	11	4	10	1^{F 3}	4	7	5	10	10	9	5	7	275
4	(United Kingdom) McLaren-Mercedes	7	6	9	8	12	9	6	13	7	5	Ret	14	11	2	7^{P}^{F}	13	8	12	Ret	12	10	12	275
5	(France) Alpine-Renault	13	9	7	9	9	6	8	9	10	7	1	7	6	8	6	10	Ret	9	8	3	4	8	155
5	(France) Alpine-Renault	Ret	10	8	17	13	Ret	14	14	Ret	9	4	11	9	10	14	16	Ret	13	9	5	13	9	155
6	(Italy) AlphaTauri-Honda	9	7	10	10	6	3	7	10	9	10	5^{F}	6	4	Ret	13	6	9	4	7	11	6	4	142
6	(Italy) AlphaTauri-Honda	17†	12	15	Ret	16	7	13	Ret	12	11	6	15	Ret	DNS	17	14	Ret	Ret	15	13	14	5	142
7	(United Kingdom) Aston Martin-Mercedes	10	8	13	11	5	2	9	8	13	8	Ret	5	12	7	11	9	10	7	11	6	11	11	77
7	(United Kingdom) Aston Martin-Mercedes	15	15†	14	13	8	Ret	10	12	17†	Ret	DSQ	20	13	12	12	18	12	14	Ret	10	Ret	13	77
8	(United Kingdom) Williams-Mercedes	14	Ret	16	14	14	16	12	17	11	12	7	2	16	9	10	15	14	16	13	17	12	Ret	23
8	(United Kingdom) Williams-Mercedes	18†	Ret	18	16	15	17†	18	Ret	16	14	8	9	17†	11	19†	17	15	17	16	Ret	Ret	Ret	23
9	(Switzerland) Alfa Romeo Racing-Ferrari	11	13	12	12	10	10	15	11	14	13	10	13	14	13	8	11	11	8	12	14	9	Ret	13
9	(Switzerland) Alfa Romeo Racing-Ferrari	12	14	Ret	15	11	11	17	15	15	15	13	18	15	14	16	12	13	11	14	15	15	Ret	13
10	(United States) Haas-Ferrari	16	16	17	18	17	13	19	16	18	17	12	16	18	15	18	19	16	18	17	16	Ret	14	0
10	(United States) Haas-Ferrari	Ret	17	19	19	18	14	20	18	19	18	Ret	17	Ret	Ret	Ret	20	17	Ret	18	18	Ret	WD	0
Pos.	Constructor	BHR (Bahrain)	EMI (Italy)	POR (Portugal)	ESP (Spain)	MON (Monaco)	AZE (Azerbaijan)	FRA (France)	STY (Austria)	AUT (Austria)	GBR (United Kingdom)	HUN (Hungary)	BEL* (Belgium)	NED (Netherlands)	ITA (Italy)	RUS (Russia)	TUR (Turkey)	USA (United States)	MXC (Mexico)	SAP (Brazil)	QAT (Qatar)	SAU (Saudi Arabia)	ABU (United Arab Emirates)	Points

Key
Colour	Result
Gold	Winner
Silver	2nd place
Bronze	3rd place
Green	Other points position
Blue	Other classified position
Blue	Not classified, finished (NC)
Purple	Not classified, retired (Ret)
Red	Did not qualify (DNQ)
Red	Did not pre-qualify (DNPQ)
Black	Disqualified (DSQ)
White	Did not start (DNS)
White	Race cancelled (C)
Blank	Did not practice (DNP)
Blank	Excluded (EX)
Blank	Did not arrive (DNA)
Blank	Withdrawn (WD)
Annotation	Meaning
Superscript number	Points-scoring position in sprint qualifying
P	Pole position
F	Fastest lap

Notes:

- † – Driver did not finish the Grand Prix, but was classified as he completed more than 90% of the race distance.
- * – Half points were awarded at the Belgian Grand Prix as less than 75% of the scheduled distance was completed. Fastest laps were not recognised in the final classification.
- Rows are not related to the drivers: within each team, individual Grand Prix standings are sorted purely based on the final classification in the race (not by total points scored in the event, which includes points awarded for fastest lap and sprint qualifying).

== See also ==
- 2021 Formula One pre-season testing
- 2021 Formula One post-season testing
