= 2021 Spanish Grand Prix =

4th round of the 2021 Formula One season

Race 4 of 22 (Note: At the time of the event Formula One planned to hold twenty-three Grands Prix.) in the 2021 Formula One World Championship
← Previous race	Next race →
- Layout of the Circuit de Barcelona-Catalunya

Race details
- Date: 9 May 2021
- Official name: Formula 1 Aramco Gran Premio de España 2021
- Location: Circuit de Barcelona-Catalunya; Montmeló, Catalonia, Spain
- Course: Permanent racing facility
- Course length: 4.675 km (2.905 miles)
- Distance: 66 laps, 308.424 km (191.646 miles)
- Weather: Cloudy
- Attendance: 0 (Note: The Grand Prix was held behind closed doors due to the COVID-19 pandemic in Spain. Because of a change to the attendance protocol in Barcelona, the event received approval for a crowd of 1,000. Those in audience at the race were members of the Circuit de Barcelona-Catalunya that needed to apply for attendance.)

Pole position
Driver	(United Kingdom) Lewis Hamilton	Mercedes
- Time: 1:16.741

Fastest lap
Driver	(Netherlands) Max Verstappen	Red Bull Racing-Honda
- Time: 1:18.149 on lap 62 (lap record)

Podium
First	(United Kingdom) Lewis Hamilton	Mercedes
Second	(Netherlands) Max Verstappen	Red Bull Racing-Honda
Third	(Finland) Valtteri Bottas	Mercedes

The 2021 Spanish Grand Prix (officially known as the Formula 1 Aramco Gran Premio de España 2021) was a Formula One motor race which took place on 9 May 2021 at the Circuit de Barcelona-Catalunya in Montmeló, Spain. The race was the fourth round of the 2021 Formula One World Championship. The race was won by Mercedes driver Lewis Hamilton from pole position ahead of Red Bull's Max Verstappen and Hamilton's teammate Valtteri Bottas. The win allowed Hamilton to extend his Championship lead over Verstappen to 14 points.

== Background ==
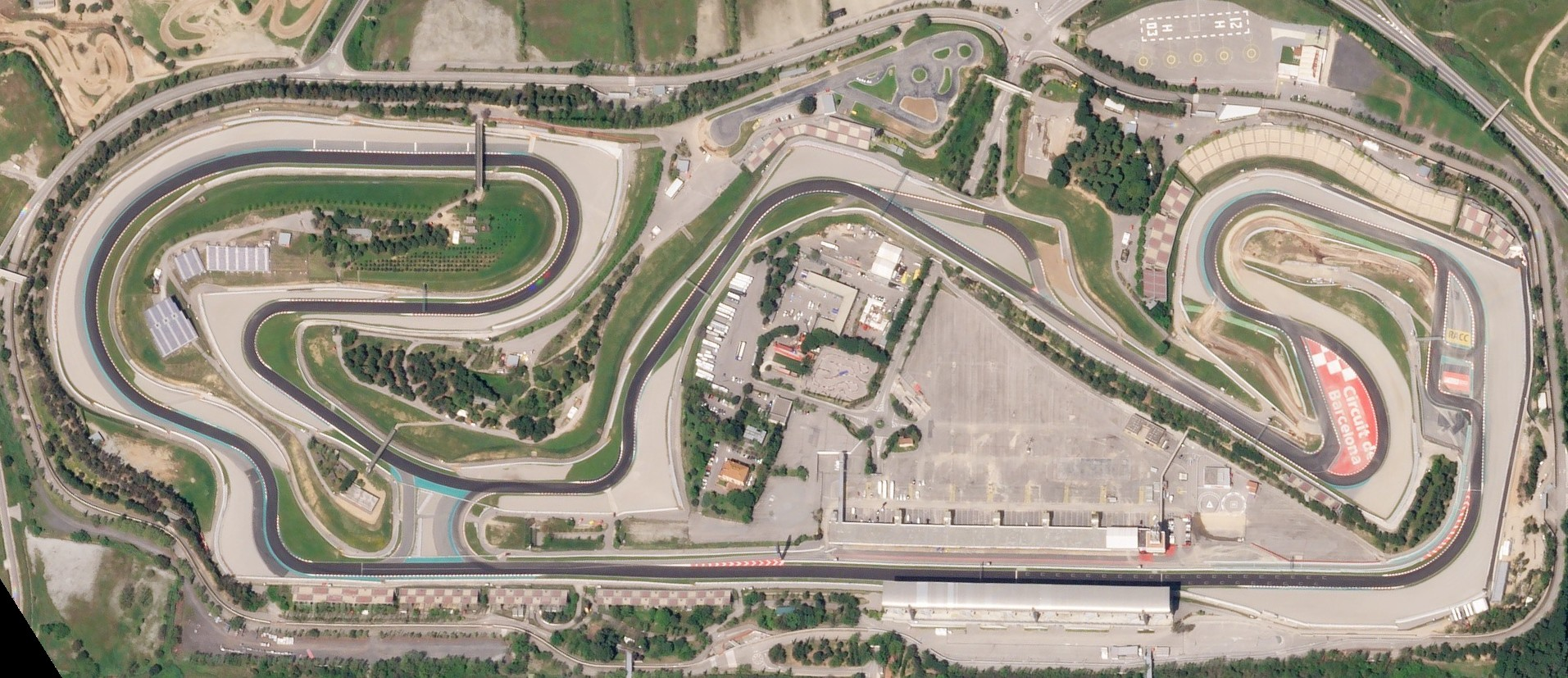
A satellite image of the Circuit de Catalunya in 2018, before the tenth turn was altered.

The race was the fourth round of the 2021 Formula One World Championship, the 61st edition of the Spanish Grand Prix, the 51st time it featured as a round of the World Championship, and the 31st time the Spanish Grand Prix took place at the Circuit de Barcelona-Catalunya. This was the first Formula One race held on this layout of the circuit, with turn 10 having been remodelled from a tight hairpin into a faster curve, to improve safety for drivers.

The drivers and teams were the same as the season entry list with no additional stand-in drivers for the race. Robert Kubica drove in the first practice session for Alfa Romeo Racing in place of Kimi Räikkönen, while Roy Nissany drove for Williams, replacing George Russell. Tyre supplier Pirelli brought the C1, C2 and C3 tyre compounds (designated hard, medium and soft respectively) for teams to use at the event. Heading into the race, Lewis Hamilton was leading the Drivers' Championship with 69 points, ahead of Max Verstappen on 61 and Lando Norris on 37. In the Constructors' Championship, Mercedes led on 101 points ahead of Red Bull on 83 and McLaren on 53.

== Practice ==
As usual, the event had three practice sessions, each lasting one hour. The first practice session started at 11:30 local time (UTC+02:00) on 7 May and ended with Valtteri Bottas fastest in his Mercedes ahead of Red Bull driver Max Verstappen and Bottas' teammate Lewis Hamilton; Nikita Mazepin and Kubica both briefly lost control in minor incidents. The second practice session started at 15:00 local time and ended with Hamilton fastest ahead of Bottas and Ferrari driver Charles Leclerc. The third practice session, which started at 12:00 local time the following day, ended with Verstappen in top, ahead of Hamilton and Leclerc.

== Qualifying ==
Qualifying started at 15:00 local time (UTC+02:00) on 8 May. Lewis Hamilton set provisional pole position in his Q3 first flying lap. Hamilton was followed by Max Verstappen and Valtteri Bottas. None of the three drivers were able to improve their times in their subsequent laps, and Hamilton earned his 100th pole position.

=== Qualifying classification ===
Pos.	No.	Driver	Constructor	Qualifying times			Final grid
Pos.	No.	Driver	Constructor	Q1	Q2	Q3	Final grid
1	44	(United Kingdom) Lewis Hamilton	Mercedes	1:18.245	1:17.166	1:16.741	1
2	33	(Netherlands) Max Verstappen	Red Bull Racing-Honda	1:18.090	1:16.922	1:16.777	2
3	77	(Finland) Valtteri Bottas	Mercedes	1:18.005	1:17.142	1:16.873	3
4	16	(Monaco) Charles Leclerc	Ferrari	1:18.041	1:17.717	1:17.510	4
5	31	(France) Esteban Ocon	Alpine-Renault	1:18.281	1:17.743	1:17.580	5
6	55	(Spain) Carlos Sainz Jr.	Ferrari	1:18.205	1:17.656	1:17.620	6
7	3	(Australia) Daniel Ricciardo	McLaren-Mercedes	1:18.264	1:17.719	1:17.622	7
8	11	(Mexico) Sergio Pérez	Red Bull Racing-Honda	1:18.203	1:17.669	1:17.701	8
9	4	(United Kingdom) Lando Norris	McLaren-Mercedes	1:17.821	1:17.696	1:18.010	9
10	14	(Spain) Fernando Alonso	Alpine-Renault	1:18.281	1:17.966	1:18.147	10
11	18	(Canada) Lance Stroll	Aston Martin-Mercedes	1:18.241	1:17.974	N/A	11
12	10	(France) Pierre Gasly	AlphaTauri-Honda	1:18.190	1:17.982	N/A	12
13	5	(Germany) Sebastian Vettel	Aston Martin-Mercedes	1:18.289	1:18.079	N/A	13
14	99	(Italy) Antonio Giovinazzi	Alfa Romeo Racing-Ferrari	1:18.549	1:18.356	N/A	14
15	63	(United Kingdom) George Russell	Williams-Mercedes	1:18.445	1:19.154	N/A	15
16	22	(Japan) Yuki Tsunoda	AlphaTauri-Honda	1:18.556	N/A	N/A	16
17	7	(Finland) Kimi Räikkönen	Alfa Romeo Racing-Ferrari	1:18.917	N/A	N/A	17
18	47	(Germany) Mick Schumacher	Haas-Ferrari	1:19.117	N/A	N/A	18
19	6	(Canada) Nicholas Latifi	Williams-Mercedes	1:19.219	N/A	N/A	19
20	9	(Russian Automobile Federation) Nikita Mazepin (Note: Nikita Mazepin is Russian, but he competed as a neutral competitor using the designation RAF (Russian Automobile Federation), as the Court of Arbitration for Sport upheld a ban on Russia competing at World Championships. The ban was implemented by the World Anti-Doping Agency in response to the state-sponsored doping program of Russian athletes.)	Haas-Ferrari	1:19.807	N/A	N/A	20^{1}
107% time: 1:23.268

Notes

- ^1 – Nikita Mazepin received a three-place grid penalty for impeding Lando Norris in Q1. The penalty was not in force as he started the race from the last position.

== Race ==
The race started at 15:00 local time (UTC+02:00) and was held over 66 laps.

Verstappen overtook Hamilton on the first corner. On lap 8, Tsunoda's engine stopped, bringing out the safety car. Pitstops began with Giovinazzi, who had a really long stop after one of his mechanics realized that one of the tyres was deflated and therefore they needed to get a new full set of tyres. He was followed by the two Williams double stacking. The race resumed by lap 11 and Gasly received a 5-second penalty for stopping out of position on the grid at the start of the race.

Gasly pitted on lap 19, serving his penalty and falling to last. And in lap 22, Vettel and Alonso triggered the pitstop window. Followed by Stroll, Sainz, Mazepin, Ocon, Norris, Schumacher, Bottas and Ricciardo in the following laps. Race leader Verstappen, pitted on lap 25 while Hamilton stayed out taking the lead. The stop was slow, and he came out behind his teammate Perez, who quickly let him pass and pitted in lap 28.

Hamilton changed tyres in lap 29 -so did Leclerc- and came out 5 seconds behind Verstappen, which meant the overcut had not been effective. It also meant that Bottas was now third and both Mercedes began closing on Verstappen.

By lap 43, after 10 laps within one second of Verstappen, Hamilton decided to pit again, committing to a two stop strategy, while Red Bull kept Verstappen out. Simultaneously, Perez finally overtook Ricciardo for fifth, and Leclerc was able to keep his position in fourth. Hamilton with better tyres, finally overtook Verstappen in lap 60, and since Bottas had already pitted again, Verstappen could get a free stop and push for the fastest lap.

The top ten was rounded by Ricciardo, Sainz, Norris, Ocon and Gasly.

=== Race classification ===
Pos.	No.	Driver	Constructor	Laps	Time/Retired	Grid	Points
1	44	(United Kingdom) Lewis Hamilton	Mercedes	66	1:33:07.680	1	25
2	33	(Netherlands) Max Verstappen	Red Bull Racing-Honda	66	+15.841	2	19^{1}
3	77	(Finland) Valtteri Bottas	Mercedes	66	+26.610	3	15
4	16	(Monaco) Charles Leclerc	Ferrari	66	+54.616	4	12
5	11	(Mexico) Sergio Pérez	Red Bull Racing-Honda	66	+1:03.671	8	10
6	3	(Australia) Daniel Ricciardo	McLaren-Mercedes	66	+1:13.768	7	8
7	55	(Spain) Carlos Sainz Jr.	Ferrari	66	+1:14.670	6	6
8	4	(United Kingdom) Lando Norris	McLaren-Mercedes	65	+1 lap	9	4
9	31	(France) Esteban Ocon	Alpine-Renault	65	+1 lap	5	2
10	10	(France) Pierre Gasly	AlphaTauri-Honda	65	+1 lap	12	1
11	18	(Canada) Lance Stroll	Aston Martin-Mercedes	65	+1 lap	11	
12	7	(Finland) Kimi Räikkönen	Alfa Romeo Racing-Ferrari	65	+1 lap	17	
13	5	(Germany) Sebastian Vettel	Aston Martin-Mercedes	65	+1 lap	13	
14	63	(United Kingdom) George Russell	Williams-Mercedes	65	+1 lap	15	
15	99	(Italy) Antonio Giovinazzi	Alfa Romeo Racing-Ferrari	65	+1 lap	14	
16	6	(Canada) Nicholas Latifi	Williams-Mercedes	65	+1 lap	19	
17	14	(Spain) Fernando Alonso	Alpine-Renault	65	+1 lap	10	
18	47	(Germany) Mick Schumacher	Haas-Ferrari	64	+2 laps	18	
19	9	(Russian Automobile Federation) Nikita Mazepin	Haas-Ferrari	64	+2 laps	20	
Ret	22	(Japan) Yuki Tsunoda	AlphaTauri-Honda	6	Electrics	16	
Fastest lap: (Netherlands) Max Verstappen (Red Bull Racing-Honda) – 1:18.149 (lap 62)

Notes

- ^1 – Includes one point for fastest lap.

== Championship standings after the race ==
Drivers' Championship standings

	Pos.	Driver	Points
	1	(United Kingdom) Lewis Hamilton	94
	2	(Netherlands) Max Verstappen	80
1	3	(Finland) Valtteri Bottas	47
1	4	(United Kingdom) Lando Norris	41
	5	(Monaco) Charles Leclerc	40

Constructors' Championship standings

Pos.	Constructor	Points
1	(Germany) Mercedes	141
2	(Austria) Red Bull Racing-Honda	112
3	(United Kingdom) McLaren-Mercedes	65
4	(Italy) Ferrari	60
5	(France) Alpine-Renault	15

- Note: Only the top five positions are included for both sets of standings.

== See also ==
- 2021 Barcelona Formula 3 round

== Notes ==
Previous race: 2021 Portuguese Grand Prix	FIA Formula One World Championship; 2021 season	Next race: 2021 Monaco Grand Prix
Previous race: 2020 Spanish Grand Prix	Spanish Grand Prix	Next race: 2022 Spanish Grand Prix
