= 2021 São Paulo Grand Prix =

19th round of the 2021 Formula One season

Race 19 of 22 in the 2021 Formula One World Championship
← Previous race	Next race →
- Layout of the Interlagos Circuit

Race details
- Date: 14 November 2021
- Official name: Formula 1 Heineken Grande Prêmio de São Paulo 2021
- Location: Interlagos Circuit, São Paulo, Brazil
- Course: Permanent racing facility
- Course length: 4.309 km (2.677 miles)
- Distance: 71 laps, 305.879 km (190.064 miles)
- Weather: Sunny
- Attendance: 181,711

Pole position
Driver	(Finland) Valtteri Bottas	Mercedes
- Grid positions set by results of sprint qualifying

Fastest lap
Driver	(Mexico) Sergio Pérez	Red Bull Racing-Honda
- Time: 1:11.010 on lap 71

Podium
First	(United Kingdom) Lewis Hamilton	Mercedes
Second	(Netherlands) Max Verstappen	Red Bull Racing-Honda
Third	(Finland) Valtteri Bottas	Mercedes

The 2021 São Paulo Grand Prix (officially known as the Formula 1 Heineken Grande Prêmio de São Paulo 2021) was a Formula One motor race, held on 14 November 2021 at the Interlagos Circuit in São Paulo, Brazil. The race was the 19th round of the 2021 Formula One World Championship. The event marked the 49th edition of the Grand Prix and the first time the event was known as the São Paulo Grand Prix, with previous editions being known as the Brazilian Grand Prix.

After being disqualified from Friday qualifying due to an inconformity with his drag reduction system (DRS), Lewis Hamilton started twentieth for the sprint race, recovering to fifth. After taking a further five-place grid penalty for the main race for exceeding the quota of internal combustion engines allocated to him, Hamilton caught up to, and ultimately passed, a leading Max Verstappen. Sprint polesitter Valtteri Bottas finished in third, which alongside Hamilton's victory, further extended Mercedes's advantage over Red Bull Racing in the fight for the Constructors' Championship; Verstappen would remain ahead of Hamilton in the Drivers' Championship standings.

== Background ==
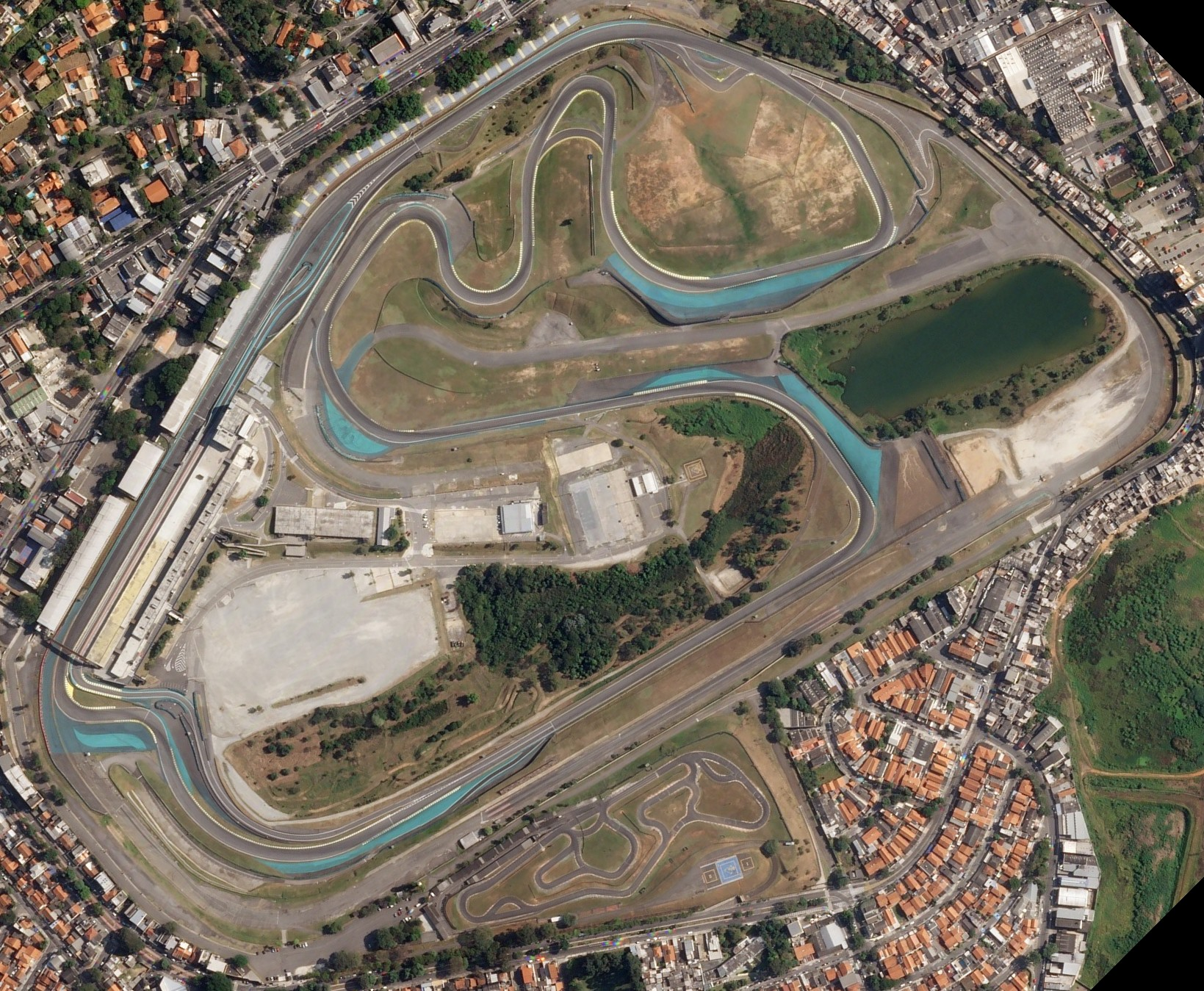
Satellite view of the circuit in 2018

The race marked its debut in the Formula One Championship calendar under the name São Paulo Grand Prix, with previous editions being known as the Brazilian Grand Prix. In November 2020, a deal was signed which would see Formula One continue to race at Interlagos until 2025, albeit under the title of São Paulo Grand Prix. The governing body, the FIA lifted the curfew on that limits overnight working after weather conditions meant the equipment arrived late to the venue. This is the 38th time that Interlagos has been visited by the championship. The race was originally to take place on this date, but it was firstly rescheduled to 7 November due to the postponement of the Australian Grand Prix; (Note: The Australian Grand Prix would later be cancelled.) then it was rescheduled again to its original date due to the reduction of the overall number of Grands Prix in the calendar, from 23 to 22.

=== Championship standings ===
Heading into the race Max Verstappen led the World Drivers' Standings with 312.5 points, 19 points ahead of second-placed Lewis Hamilton. Valtteri Bottas was in third on 185 points, too far behind Verstappen to be able to win the title, but 20 points ahead of Sergio Pérez in fourth with Lando Norris fifth on 150 points. In the World Constructors' Standings, Mercedes led with 478.5 points, one point ahead of second-placed Red Bull Racing. Ferrari were third with 268.5 points ahead of McLaren on 255. Alpine and AlphaTauri were fifth and sixth with 106 points each, with Alpine being ahead courtesy of a win, compared to no wins for AlphaTauri.

=== Entrants ===
The drivers and teams were the same as the season entry list with no additional stand-in drivers for the race or practice. Kimi Räikkönen achieved his 350th Grand Prix entry in this race and became the first F1 driver to reach that milestone.

=== Tyre choices ===
Sole tyre supplier Pirelli allocated the C2, C3, and C4 compounds of tyre to be used during this Grand Prix weekend.

== Practice ==
The weekend saw two practice sessions, each lasting one hour. The first took place on 12 November at 12:30 local time (UTC-3) and the second took place at 12:00 on 13 November.

== Qualifying ==
Qualifying took place at 16:00 on 12 November, with the results determining the starting order for sprint qualifying.

=== Post-qualifying ===
After the qualifying session, Hamilton was referred to the stewards for an alleged technical infringement. The technical delegate's report stated that Hamilton's drag reduction system's opening slot was larger than the permitted 85 mm (3.3 in). The rear wing assembly of Hamilton's car was removed and impounded pending investigations. He was later disqualified from qualifying, forcing him to start at the back of the grid for the sprint qualifying.

Verstappen was referred to the stewards for an alleged violation of article 2.5.1 of the FIA International Sporting Code, after he appeared to have touched Hamilton's car during parc fermé. Verstappen received a €50,000 fine.

=== Qualifying classification ===
Pos.	No.	Driver	Constructor	Qualifying times			SQ grid
Pos.	No.	Driver	Constructor	Q1	Q2	Q3	SQ grid
1	33	(Netherlands) Max Verstappen	Red Bull Racing-Honda	1:09.329	1:08.499	1:08.372	1
2	77	(Finland) Valtteri Bottas	Mercedes	1:09.040	1:08.426	1:08.469	2
3	11	(Mexico) Sergio Pérez	Red Bull Racing-Honda	1:09.172	1:08.973	1:08.483	3
4	10	(France) Pierre Gasly	AlphaTauri-Honda	1:09.347	1:08.903	1:08.777	4
5	55	(Spain) Carlos Sainz Jr.	Ferrari	1:09.046	1:09.031	1:08.826	5
6	16	(Monaco) Charles Leclerc	Ferrari	1:09.155	1:08.859	1:08.960	6
7	4	(United Kingdom) Lando Norris	McLaren-Mercedes	1:09.365	1:09.030	1:08.980	7
8	3	(Australia) Daniel Ricciardo	McLaren-Mercedes	1:09.374	1:09.093	1:09.039	8
9	14	(Spain) Fernando Alonso	Alpine-Renault	1:09.391	1:09.137	1:09.113	9
10	31	(France) Esteban Ocon	Alpine-Renault	1:09.430	1:09.189	N/A	10
11	5	(Germany) Sebastian Vettel	Aston Martin-Mercedes	1:09.451	1:09.399	N/A	11
12	22	(Japan) Yuki Tsunoda	AlphaTauri-Honda	1:09.350	1:09.483	N/A	12
13	7	(Finland) Kimi Räikkönen	Alfa Romeo Racing-Ferrari	1:09.598	1:09.503	N/A	13
14	99	(Italy) Antonio Giovinazzi	Alfa Romeo Racing-Ferrari	1:09.342	1:10.227	N/A	14
15	18	(Canada) Lance Stroll	Aston Martin-Mercedes	1:09.663	N/A	N/A	15
16	6	(Canada) Nicholas Latifi	Williams-Mercedes	1:09.897	N/A	N/A	16
17	63	(United Kingdom) George Russell	Williams-Mercedes	1:09.953	N/A	N/A	17
18	47	(Germany) Mick Schumacher	Haas-Ferrari	1:10.329	N/A	N/A	18
19	9	(Russian Automobile Federation) Nikita Mazepin (Note: Nikita Mazepin is Russian, but he competed as a neutral competitor using the designation RAF (Russian Automobile Federation), as the Court of Arbitration for Sport upheld a ban on Russia competing at World Championships. The ban was implemented by the World Anti-Doping Agency in response to the state-sponsored doping program of Russian athletes.)	Haas-Ferrari	1:10.589	N/A	N/A	19
DSQ	44	(United Kingdom) Lewis Hamilton	Mercedes	1:08.733	1:08.068	1:07.934	20^{1}
107% time: 1:13.544

Notes

- ^1 – Lewis Hamilton qualified first, but was disqualified because his DRS was found not to be in conformity with the rules. He was allowed to race in the sprint qualifying at the stewards' discretion.

== Sprint qualifying ==
Sprint qualifying took place on 13 November at 16:30 and was contested over 24 laps, with the results determining the starting order for the race.

=== Sprint qualifying classification ===
Pos.	No.	Driver	Constructor	Laps	Time/Retired	Grid	Points	Final grid
1	77	(Finland) Valtteri Bottas	Mercedes	24	29:09.559	2	3	1
2	33	(Netherlands) Max Verstappen	Red Bull Racing-Honda	24	+1.170	1	2	2
3	55	(Spain) Carlos Sainz Jr.	Ferrari	24	+18.723	5	1	3
4	11	(Mexico) Sergio Pérez	Red Bull Racing-Honda	24	+19.787	3		4
5	44	(United Kingdom) Lewis Hamilton	Mercedes	24	+20.872	20		10^{a}
6	4	(United Kingdom) Lando Norris	McLaren-Mercedes	24	+22.558	7		5
7	16	(Monaco) Charles Leclerc	Ferrari	24	+25.056	6		6
8	10	(France) Pierre Gasly	AlphaTauri-Honda	24	+34.158	4		7
9	31	(France) Esteban Ocon	Alpine-Renault	24	+34.632	10		8
10	5	(Germany) Sebastian Vettel	Aston Martin-Mercedes	24	+34.867	11		9
11	3	(Australia) Daniel Ricciardo	McLaren-Mercedes	24	+35.869	8		11
12	14	(Spain) Fernando Alonso	Alpine-Renault	24	+36.578	9		12
13	99	(Italy) Antonio Giovinazzi	Alfa Romeo Racing-Ferrari	24	+41.880	14		13
14	18	(Canada) Lance Stroll	Aston Martin-Mercedes	24	+44.037	15		14
15	22	(Japan) Yuki Tsunoda	AlphaTauri-Honda	24	+46.150	12		15
16	6	(Canada) Nicholas Latifi	Williams-Mercedes	24	+46.760	16		16
17	63	(United Kingdom) George Russell	Williams-Mercedes	24	+47.739	17		17
18	7	(Finland) Kimi Räikkönen	Alfa Romeo Racing-Ferrari	24	+50.014	13		PL^{b}
19	47	(Germany) Mick Schumacher	Haas-Ferrari	24	+1:01.680	18		18
20	9	(Russian Automobile Federation) Nikita Mazepin	Haas-Ferrari	24	+1:07.474	19		19
Fastest lap: (Netherlands) Max Verstappen (Red Bull Racing-Honda) – 1:12.114 (lap 9)

Notes

- ^a – Lewis Hamilton received a five-place grid penalty for exceeding his quota of internal combustion engines (ICE).
- ^b – Kimi Räikkönen qualified 18th, but was required to start the race from the pit lane due to a rear wing assembly change under parc fermé conditions.

== Race ==
The race was won by Hamilton, with Verstappen and Bottas completing the podium, and Pérez setting the fastest lap.

=== Race classification ===
Pos.	No.	Driver	Constructor	Laps	Time/Retired	Grid	Points
1	44	(United Kingdom) Lewis Hamilton	Mercedes	71	1:32:22.851	10	25
2	33	(Netherlands) Max Verstappen	Red Bull Racing-Honda	71	+10.496	2	18
3	77	(Finland) Valtteri Bottas	Mercedes	71	+13.576	1	15
4	11	(Mexico) Sergio Pérez	Red Bull Racing-Honda	71	+39.940	4	13^{a}
5	16	(Monaco) Charles Leclerc	Ferrari	71	+49.517	6	10
6	55	(Spain) Carlos Sainz Jr.	Ferrari	71	+51.820	3	8
7	10	(France) Pierre Gasly	AlphaTauri-Honda	70	+1 lap	7	6
8	31	(France) Esteban Ocon	Alpine-Renault	70	+1 lap	8	4
9	14	(Spain) Fernando Alonso	Alpine-Renault	70	+1 lap	12	2
10	4	(United Kingdom) Lando Norris	McLaren-Mercedes	70	+1 lap	5	1
11	5	(Germany) Sebastian Vettel	Aston Martin-Mercedes	70	+1 lap	9	
12	7	(Finland) Kimi Räikkönen	Alfa Romeo Racing-Ferrari	70	+1 lap	PL	
13	63	(United Kingdom) George Russell	Williams-Mercedes	70	+1 lap	17	
14	99	(Italy) Antonio Giovinazzi	Alfa Romeo Racing-Ferrari	70	+1 lap	13	
15	22	(Japan) Yuki Tsunoda	AlphaTauri-Honda	70	+1 lap	15	
16	6	(Canada) Nicholas Latifi	Williams-Mercedes	70	+1 lap	16	
17	9	(Russian Automobile Federation) Nikita Mazepin	Haas-Ferrari	69	+2 laps	19	
18	47	(Germany) Mick Schumacher	Haas-Ferrari	69	+2 laps	18	
Ret	3	(Australia) Daniel Ricciardo	McLaren-Mercedes	49	Power loss	11	
Ret	18	(Canada) Lance Stroll	Aston Martin-Mercedes	47	Collision damage	14	
Fastest lap: (Mexico) Sergio Pérez (Red Bull Racing-Honda) – 1:11.010 (lap 71)

Notes

- ^a – Includes one point for fastest lap.

== Championship standings after the race ==
Drivers' Championship standings

	Pos.	Driver	Points
Unchanged	1	(Netherlands) Max Verstappen*	332.5
Unchanged	2	(United Kingdom) Lewis Hamilton*	318.5
Unchanged	3	(Finland) Valtteri Bottas	203
Unchanged	4	(Mexico) Sergio Pérez	178
Unchanged	5	(United Kingdom) Lando Norris	151

Constructors' Championship standings

	Pos.	Constructor	Points
Unchanged	1	(Germany) Mercedes*	521.5
Unchanged	2	(Austria) Red Bull Racing-Honda*	510.5
Unchanged	3	(Italy) Ferrari	287.5
Unchanged	4	(United Kingdom) McLaren-Mercedes	256
Unchanged	5	(France) Alpine-Renault	112

- Note: Only the top five positions are included for both sets of standings.
- Bold text and an asterisk indicates competitors who still had a theoretical chance of becoming World Champion.

== Notes ==
Previous race: 2021 Mexico City Grand Prix	FIA Formula One World Championship; 2021 season	Next race: 2021 Qatar Grand Prix
Previous race: 2019 Brazilian Grand Prix	São Paulo Grand Prix	Next race: 2022 São Paulo Grand Prix
