= 2017 Abu Dhabi Grand Prix =

Race 20 of 20 in the 2017 Formula One World Championship
← Previous race

Race details
- Date: 26 November 2017
- Official name: 2017 Formula 1 Etihad Airways Abu Dhabi Grand Prix
- Location: Yas Marina Circuit, Abu Dhabi, United Arab Emirates
- Course: Permanent racing facility
- Course length: 5.554 km (3.451 miles)
- Distance: 55 laps, 305.355 km (189.739 miles)
- Weather: Clear
- Attendance: 195,000

Pole position
Driver	(Finland) Valtteri Bottas	Mercedes
- Time: 1:36.231

Fastest lap
Driver	(Finland) Valtteri Bottas	Mercedes
- Time: 1:40.650 on lap 52

Podium
First	(Finland) Valtteri Bottas	Mercedes
Second	(United Kingdom) Lewis Hamilton	Mercedes
Third	(Germany) Sebastian Vettel	Ferrari

The 2017 Abu Dhabi Grand Prix (formally known as the 2017 Formula 1 Etihad Airways Abu Dhabi Grand Prix) was a Formula One motor race held on 26 November 2017 at the Yas Marina Circuit in Abu Dhabi, United Arab Emirates. The race was the twentieth and final round of the 2017 FIA Formula One World Championship and marked the ninth running of the Abu Dhabi Grand Prix and the ninth time that the race has been run as a World Championship event since the inaugural season in 1950.

Mercedes driver Valtteri Bottas controlled the pace throughout the race to win from pole position. Lewis Hamilton finished in close second place, with Sebastian Vettel finishing third. Red Bull's Daniel Ricciardo retired due to mechanical failure, which was significant in facilitating fourth place for Kimi Räikkönen in the Driver's Championship. This was also the final Grand Prix for 11-time Grand Prix winner and 2008 runner-up Felipe Massa.

The first Formula One eSports event was held in tandem with the Grand Prix, with British competitor Brendon Leigh winning the 2017 competition.

Bottas would not win again until the 2019 Australian Grand Prix a full season later.

== Report ==
=== Background ===
With both championships and the top places almost settled, the final race of the season would settle an intense three-way battle for sixth place between constructors Toro Rosso, Renault and Haas. Toro Rosso was ahead by 4 points, but running with two recently signed drivers who were yet to score a point. Renault was then 2 points ahead of Haas. Fourth place in the Drivers' Championship was also unsettled, contested by Daniel Ricciardo and Kimi Räikkönen. Ricciardo was 7 points ahead of Räikkönen.

The Abu Dhabi Grand Prix takes place at sunset, leading to great changes in track and air temperature. Free practices 1 and 3 are in afternoon heat, whereas free practice 2, qualifying and the race begin in the slightly cooler evening. The temperatures further evolve through the race, as it usually lasts two hours and spans the sunset.

The weekend marked the final Formula One race for Felipe Massa, who retired from Formula One and moved to Formula E. Throughout his F1 career, Massa scored 11 wins, 16 pole positions, 15 fastest laps, 41 podiums, and 1167 career points. It was also the last Formula One race to date for Pascal Wehrlein, as he returned to the Deutsche Tourenwagen Masters. This would be the last race to feature a Brazilian driver until Pietro Fittipaldi raced in the 2020 Sakhir and Abu Dhabi Grands Prix three seasons later. This was also the last Formula One race broadcast by NBC Sports in the United States; the rights went to ESPN for 2018.

=== Free practice ===
Sebastian Vettel set the fastest lap time in FP1 for Ferrari, just over a tenth of a second faster than Mercedes' Lewis Hamilton in second, with Max Verstappen close behind in his Red Bull. Hamilton bettered Vettel's fastest lap time in FP2, followed by Ricciardo's Red Bull. Hamilton retained the fastest lap time in FP3. During this session, the lap times increased in speed. At about the half-way point, Räikkönen's Ferrari bettered Hamilton's time and Vettel's came within a whisker. After this, Hamilton again improved his time, and Valtteri Bottas improved to second, for a Mercedes one-two. Hamilton's final fastest lap was almost 3 tenths faster than Bottas in second and over half a second faster than both Räikkönen in third and Vettel in fourth. Red Bull set fifth and sixth and McLaren set seventh and eighth.

=== Qualifying ===
All cars were fitted with Pirelli ultrasoft tyres for Q1. Hamilton and Bottas traded lap times whilst Räikkönen appeared to outpace Vettel in the following two positions. In Q2, Hamilton set a marginally faster time than Bottas, whilst Vettel likewise pipped Räikkönen. In both sessions, the Red Bulls were further behind, with Ricciardo in fifth and Verstappen in sixth.

The final qualifying round saw Bottas set a faster time than Hamilton early, with neither improving. Hamilton qualified in P2, with Vettel remaining ahead of Räikkönen. An unexpected change to the order arose when Ricciardo set a late lap ahead of Räikkönen taking P4. Räikkönen was in P5 and Verstappen in P6. Further back, Renault's Nico Hülkenberg qualified ahead of the Force Indias, amongst which Sergio Pérez led Esteban Ocon. Felipe Massa completed the top-ten.

=== Race ===
After the front-runners all made a good start, positions at the front of the field did not change from the start grid into the opening laps. Mercedes driver Bottas retained first place from pole position. Hamilton followed Bottas closely, able to challenge for position at times. Hamilton later congratulated Bottas on his dominant performance, saying the former 'gave it everything, every single lap'. Bottas said that he had been "managing the pace and that way the race", and "it was a nice feeling, a really nice feeling", suggested he could have pushed harder. Indeed, Bottas set the fastest lap of the race in the closing stages.

Behind, Vettel remained in third place through most of the race, largely neither challenged for the podium nor mounting a convincing challenge against Hamilton's second place. Räikkönen put his nose ahead of Ricciardo on the opening lap, but Ricciardo held fourth place until retiring due to a hydraulic failure on lap 21. Both Toro Rosso drivers spun off the track, but rejoined to complete the race as back-markers. All cars ran a one-stop strategy. Carlos Sainz Jr., one of the later cars to pit, was released by Renault with the left-front wheel loose. Sainz made it out of the pitlane before retiring, and Renault incurred a fine for the unsafe release. The other Renault driver Nico Hülkenberg incurred a 5-second stop-go penalty early in the race for gaining an advantage cutting a corner. Later serving the penalty during a scheduled pit-stop, there was a delay removing the right-rear wheel reducing his track position to 11th. He fought back up to 6th place to secure the points required to lift Renault up to sixth in the Constructors' Championship.

The top three remained the same throughout most of the race, Hamilton taking the lead briefly between Bottas' earlier pit-stop and his own pit-stop. Bottas won the race. Hamilton finished in close second place, with Vettel finishing third. Ricciardo's retirement was significant in handing the fourth place in the Drivers' Championship to Räikkönen. Excluding the retired Ricciardo, the top eight places were ordered identically to the starting grid. Fernando Alonso had overtaken Massa for ninth. Massa finished in tenth (the last points-paying) position in the final Formula One Grand Prix of his career.

== Classification ==
=== Qualifying ===
Pos.	Car no.	Driver	Constructor	Qualifying times			Final grid
Pos.	Car no.	Driver	Constructor	Q1	Q2	Q3	Final grid
1	77	(Finland) Valtteri Bottas	Mercedes	1:37.356	1:36.822	1:36.231	1
2	44	(United Kingdom) Lewis Hamilton	Mercedes	1:37.391	1:36.742	1:36.403	2
3	5	(Germany) Sebastian Vettel	Ferrari	1:37.817	1:37.023	1:36.777	3
4	3	(Australia) Daniel Ricciardo	Red Bull Racing-TAG Heuer	1:38.016	1:37.583	1:36.959	4
5	7	(Finland) Kimi Räikkönen	Ferrari	1:37.453	1:37.302	1:36.985	5
6	33	(Netherlands) Max Verstappen	Red Bull Racing-TAG Heuer	1:38.021	1:37.777	1:37.328	6
7	27	(Germany) Nico Hülkenberg	Renault	1:38.781	1:38.138	1:38.282	7
8	11	(Mexico) Sergio Pérez	Force India-Mercedes	1:38.601	1:38.359	1:38.374	8
9	31	(France) Esteban Ocon	Force India-Mercedes	1:38.896	1:38.392	1:38.397	9
10	19	(Brazil) Felipe Massa	Williams-Mercedes	1:38.629	1:38.565	1:38.550	10
11	14	(Spain) Fernando Alonso	McLaren-Honda	1:38.820	1:38.636		11
12	55	(Spain) Carlos Sainz Jr.	Renault	1:38.810	1:38.725		12
13	2	(Belgium) Stoffel Vandoorne	McLaren-Honda	1:38.777	1:38.808		13
14	20	(Denmark) Kevin Magnussen	Haas-Ferrari	1:39.395	1:39.298		14
15	18	(Canada) Lance Stroll	Williams-Mercedes	1:39.503	1:39.646		15
16	8	(France) Romain Grosjean	Haas-Ferrari	1:39.516			16
17	10	(France) Pierre Gasly	Toro Rosso	1:39.724			17
18	94	(Germany) Pascal Wehrlein	Sauber-Ferrari	1:39.930			18
19	9	(Sweden) Marcus Ericsson	Sauber-Ferrari	1:39.994			19
20	28	(New Zealand) Brendon Hartley	Toro Rosso	1:40.471			20^{1}
107% time: 1:44.170

Notes

- ^1 – Brendon Hartley received a 10-place grid penalty for exceeding his quota of power unit components.

=== Race ===
Pos.	No.	Driver	Constructor	Laps	Time/Retired	Grid	Points
1	77	(Finland) Valtteri Bottas	Mercedes	55	1:34:14.062	1	25
2	44	(United Kingdom) Lewis Hamilton	Mercedes	55	+3.899	2	18
3	5	(Germany) Sebastian Vettel	Ferrari	55	+19.330	3	15
4	7	(Finland) Kimi Räikkönen	Ferrari	55	+45.386	5	12
5	33	(Netherlands) Max Verstappen	Red Bull Racing-TAG Heuer	55	+46.269	6	10
6	27	(Germany) Nico Hülkenberg	Renault	55	+1:25.713	7	8
7	11	(Mexico) Sergio Pérez	Force India-Mercedes	55	+1:32.062	8	6
8	31	(France) Esteban Ocon	Force India-Mercedes	55	+1:38.911	9	4
9	14	(Spain) Fernando Alonso	McLaren-Honda	54	+1 lap	11	2
10	19	(Brazil) Felipe Massa	Williams-Mercedes	54	+1 lap	10	1
11	8	(France) Romain Grosjean	Haas-Ferrari	54	+1 lap	16	
12	2	(Belgium) Stoffel Vandoorne	McLaren-Honda	54	+1 lap	13	
13	20	(Denmark) Kevin Magnussen	Haas-Ferrari	54	+1 lap	14	
14	94	(Germany) Pascal Wehrlein	Sauber-Ferrari	54	+1 lap	18	
15	28	(New Zealand) Brendon Hartley	Toro Rosso	54	+1 lap	20	
16	10	(France) Pierre Gasly	Toro Rosso	54	+1 lap	17	
17	9	(Sweden) Marcus Ericsson	Sauber-Ferrari	54	+1 lap	19	
18	18	(Canada) Lance Stroll	Williams-Mercedes	54	+1 lap	15	
Ret	55	(Spain) Carlos Sainz Jr.	Renault	31	Loose wheel	12	
Ret	3	(Australia) Daniel Ricciardo	Red Bull Racing-TAG Heuer	20	Hydraulics	4	

== Final Championship standings ==
Drivers' Championship standings

	Pos.	Driver	Points
	1	(United Kingdom) **Lewis Hamilton**	363
	2	(Germany) Sebastian Vettel	317
	3	(Finland) Valtteri Bottas	305
1	4	(Finland) Kimi Räikkönen	205
1	5	(Australia) Daniel Ricciardo	200

Constructors' Championship standings

Pos.	Constructor	Points
1	(Germany) **Mercedes**	668
2	(Italy) Ferrari	522
3	(Austria) Red Bull Racing-TAG Heuer	368
4	Force India-Mercedes	187
5	(United Kingdom) Williams-Mercedes	83

- Note: Only the top five positions are included for the sets of standings.
- **Bold text** indicates the 2017 World Champions.

== See also ==
- 2017 Yas Island Formula 2 round
- 2017 Yas Marina GP3 Series round

Previous race: 2017 Brazilian Grand Prix	FIA Formula One World Championship; 2017 season	Next race: 2018 Australian Grand Prix
Previous race: 2016 Abu Dhabi Grand Prix	Abu Dhabi Grand Prix	Next race: 2018 Abu Dhabi Grand Prix
