= Abu Dhabi Grand Prix =

Annually held Formula One motor racing event

- Yas Marina Circuit
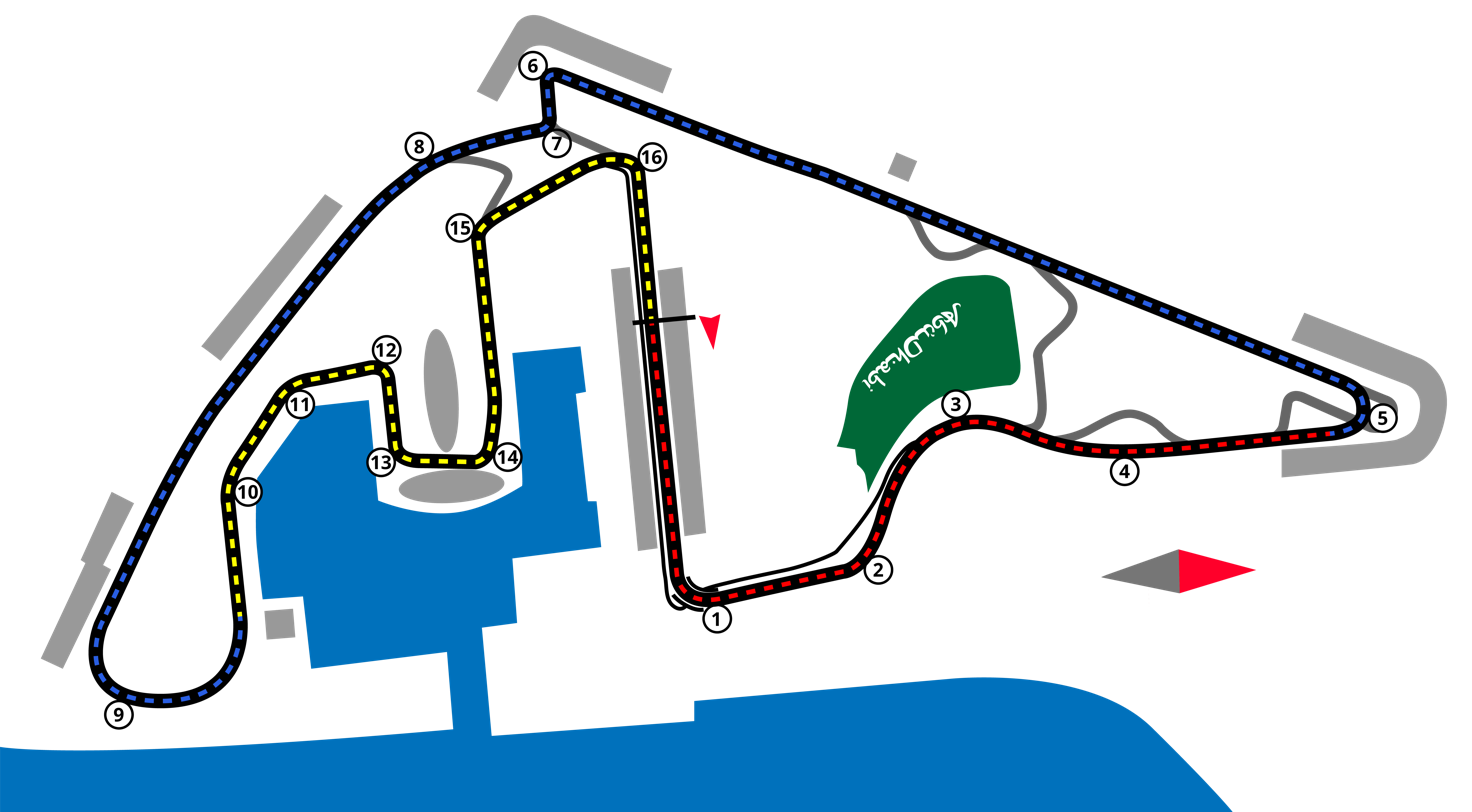

Race information
- Number of times held: 17
- First held: 2009
- Most wins (drivers): (United Kingdom) Lewis Hamilton (Netherlands) Max Verstappen (5)
- Most wins (constructors): (Austria) Red Bull Racing (8)
- Circuit length: 5.281 km (3.281 miles)
- Race length: 306.183 km (190.253 miles)
- Laps: 58

Last race (2025)

Pole position
- (Netherlands) Max Verstappen; Red Bull Racing-Honda RBPT; 1:22.207

Podium
- 1. (Netherlands) M. Verstappen; Red Bull Racing-Honda RBPT; 1:26:07.469; 2. (Australia) O. Piastri; McLaren-Mercedes; +12.594; 3. (United Kingdom) L. Norris; McLaren-Mercedes; +16.572

Fastest lap
- (Monaco) Charles Leclerc; Ferrari; 1:26.725

The Abu Dhabi Grand Prix (Arabic: سباق جائزة أبوظبي الكبرى) is a Formula One motor racing event. The first race took place on 1 November 2009, held at the Hermann Tilke-designed Yas Marina Circuit on Yas Island, near Abu Dhabi, the capital of the United Arab Emirates.

The W Abu Dhabi - Yas Island is over the short straight between turn 13 and 14. It was announced in early 2007 at the Abu Dhabi F1 Festival. On 25 June 2008, the FIA announced the provisional 2009 Formula One calendar including the Abu Dhabi Grand Prix as the 19th and final race of the season on 15 November. On 5 November 2008, however, it was announced that the race would be held as the season finale on 1 November, two weeks before the initially planned date, as the 17th and final race. The event has been held every year since, and is due to take place at the Yas Marina Circuit until at least 2030.

The inaugural race was Formula One's first day–night race, starting at 17:00 local time. Floodlights used to illuminate the circuit were switched on from the start of the event to ensure a seamless transition from daylight to darkness. Subsequent Abu Dhabi Grands Prix have also been day–night races.

== History ==
=== 2007–2013: Origins and Early Grands Prix in V8 era ===
Formula 1 first came to Abu Dhabi in 2007 in the form of the first Formula One Festival. Announced in January 2007, the event which took place on 3 February 2007 was free, and the largest gathering of current Formula One cars and drivers outside of a Grand Prix. At the festival it was announced that Abu Dhabi had won the rights to host a Grand Prix from 2009 until 2016. Later that year, Etihad Airways negotiated a three-year deal for them to become sponsors of the Grand Prix.

For the 2009 season, the 2009 Abu Dhabi Grand Prix was added to the schedule. It was provisionally announced as being held on 15 November 2009, as the 19th and final Grand Prix of the season. Both the Canadian Grand Prix and French Grand Prix were later removed from the provisional schedule, and as a result the Abu Dhabi Grand Prix was moved to 1 November 2009 where it would become the last of 17 meetings. In August 2009, it was announced that the start time would be 17:00 local time (13:00 UTC), and that the race would be floodlit. The race was won by Sebastian Vettel for Red Bull Racing.

For the 2010 Formula One season, the 2010 Abu Dhabi Grand Prix was held on the Yas Marina Circuit, from 12 until 14 November 2010. The Drivers' Championship was decided in Abu Dhabi for the first time. With championship leader Fernando Alonso losing out and Sebastian Vettel completing his second consecutive win on this track, the young German driver subsequently sealed the world championship.

The 2011 Abu Dhabi Grand Prix was the 18th and penultimate race of the 2011 FIA Formula One World Championship, and took place on 11 until 13 November. The race was won by Lewis Hamilton in a McLaren-Mercedes. Second was Fernando Alonso in a Ferrari, with Jenson Button coming third in a McLaren-Mercedes. Sebastian Vettel, in a Red Bull-Renault, had been on pole position, but retired after a puncture on the first lap whilst going round the second corner.

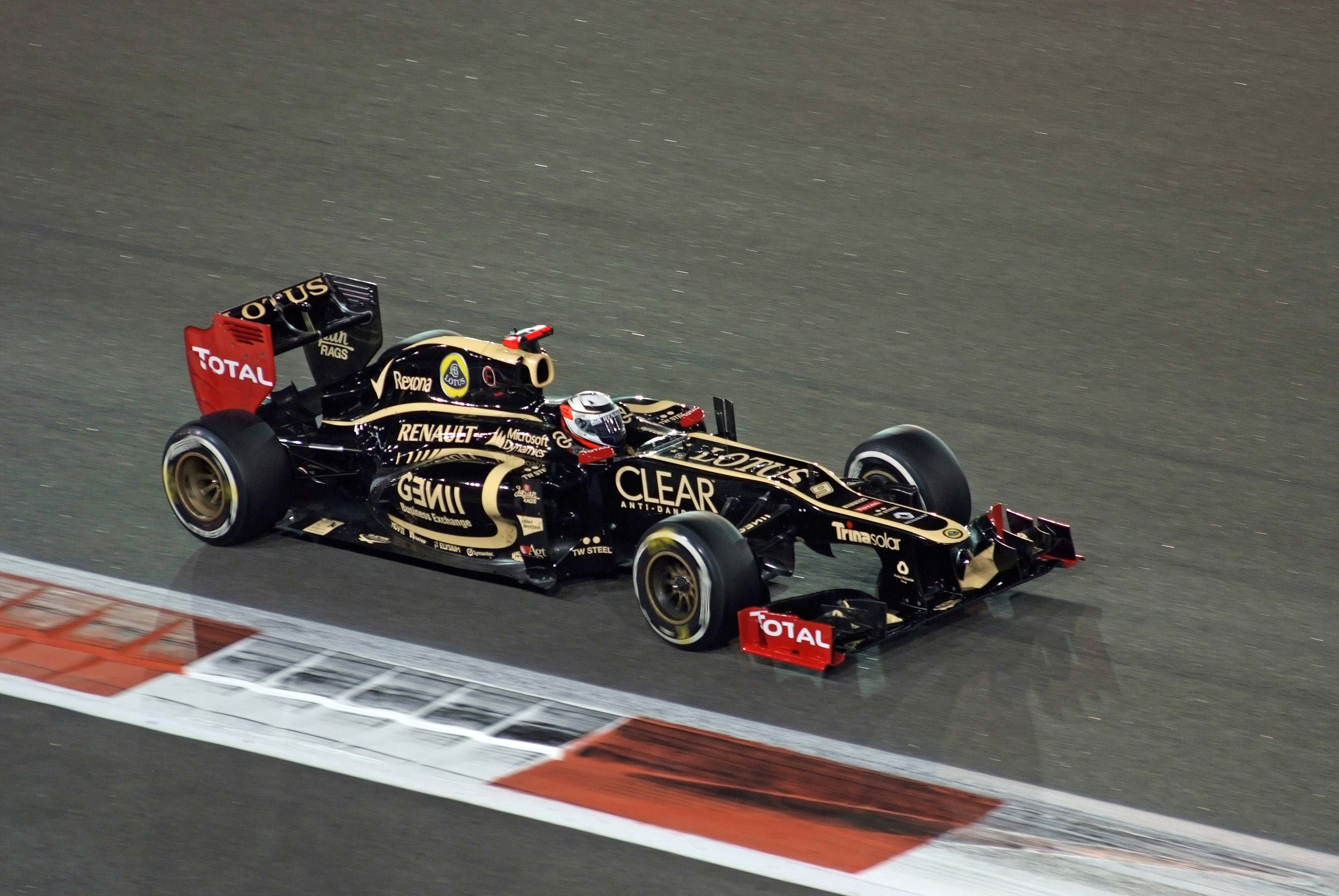
Lotus's Kimi Räikkönen won the 2012 race; his first victory since his return to the sport earlier in the season

In 2012, championship leader Sebastian Vettel finished the race in 3rd position after starting from the pitlane, due to his disqualification from qualifying due to not having enough fuel to return to parc fermé. His main championship rival Fernando Alonso finished 2nd behind the Finnish driver Kimi Räikkönen, who won for the first time after his return to Formula One earlier in 2012.

The 2013 edition was won by Sebastian Vettel and Red Bull Racing for the third time, leading every lap. Having clinched their fourth consecutive Drivers' and Constructors' Championships respectively at the Indian Grand Prix, the team celebrated their achievements in Abu Dhabi with David Coulthard performing some doughnuts on the helipad of the Burj Al Arab luxury hotel in Dubai, 210 m (690 ft) above ground level.

=== 2014–2021: V6 Hybrid era ===
The 2014 Abu Dhabi Grand Prix took place on 23 November and was the concluding race of the 2014 FIA Formula One World Championship. Double points were awarded for the race, which was won by Lewis Hamilton, securing his second Drivers' Championship.

The 2015 Abu Dhabi Grand Prix was held on 29 November 2015. The race was won by Nico Rosberg making it three wins in a row with Lewis Hamilton and Kimi Räikkönen completing the podium.

The 2016 Abu Dhabi Grand Prix was held on 27 November 2016. The race was won by Lewis Hamilton making it four wins in a row with Nico Rosberg and Sebastian Vettel completing the podium and Rosberg securing his one and only Drivers' Championship.

The 2017 Abu Dhabi Grand Prix was held on 26 November 2017. The race was won by Valtteri Bottas, with Lewis Hamilton in second and Sebastian Vettel completing the podium.

The 2018 Abu Dhabi Grand Prix was held on 25 November 2018. The race was won by Lewis Hamilton, with Sebastian Vettel in second and Max Verstappen completing the podium.

The 2019 Abu Dhabi Grand Prix was held on 1 December 2019. The race was won by six-time champion Lewis Hamilton, with Max Verstappen in second and Charles Leclerc in third. In this edition, Hamilton successfully achieved a "Grand Slam," by qualifying on pole, led every single lap and winning the race.

The 2020 Abu Dhabi Grand Prix was scheduled for 29 November but the race was moved to 13 December to allow the Bahrain Grand Prix, which had been postponed due to the COVID-19 pandemic, to run. The race was won by Max Verstappen, with Valtteri Bottas and Lewis Hamilton finishing second and third respectively.

On 9 December 2021, an extended 10-year agreement was signed between Abu Dhabi Motorsports Management and the Formula One Group, where Abu Dhabi retains the contractual right to hold final race of the F1 season until 2030. The race was held on 12 December 2021. Max Verstappen controversially won his first World Drivers' Championship when he crossed the finishing line first, followed by Lewis Hamilton in second, and Carlos Sainz Jr. in third. Mercedes won their 8th consecutive Constructors' Championship, followed closely by Red Bull Racing in second. Verstappen's race and championship win was mired in controversy as the race director Michael Masi used the incorrect procedure for withdrawing the safety car prior to resuming racing on the final lap of the race. The FIA launched an inquiry into the events of the race, concluding that whilst the safety car did not stay out for the additional lap, "as required by Article 48.12", the result was legitimised because, as Mercedes AMG did not appeal, there was "no available mechanism to change the classification". In addition, Masi was replaced by Niels Wittich and Eduardo Freitas for 2022 onward.

=== 2022–present: Ground effect era ===
The 2022 Abu Dhabi Grand Prix was held on 20 November 2022. The race was won by Max Verstappen with Charles Leclerc in second, and Sergio Pérez in third.

The 2023 Abu Dhabi Grand Prix was held on 26 November 2023 and was won by Verstappen ahead of Leclerc and George Russell. By this point, Verstappen had secured the Drivers' Championship at the Qatar Grand Prix sprint event, and the Constructors' Championship in Japan. Winning the Grand Prix, Verstappen became the first driver to lead one thousand laps in a single season, and the only driver to have completed every racing lap in the 2023 season.

The 2024 Abu Dhabi Grand Prix was won by Lando Norris for the first time, ahead of Ferrari drivers Carlos Sainz Jr. then Charles Leclerc completing the podium. McLaren won the Constructors title for the first time since 1998, beating Ferrari to the title.

At the 2025 Abu Dhabi Grand Prix, Lando Norris's third-place finish was enough to win him the 2025 Drivers' Championship by two points from race winner Max Verstappen. Oscar Piastri finished the race in second, and the championship in third.

== Controversies ==
Swedish pop star Zara Larsson stated she would not perform at the scheduled December 2026 Abu Dhabi Grand Prix after fans urged her to boycott the event due to the UAE's alleged role in the Sudan war. Despite her announcement, her name remained on official event promotional listings.

== Circuit ==
The Yas Marina Circuit was designed by Hermann Tilke and is located on Yas Island – a 2,550 hectares (25.5 km^{2}) island on the east coast of Abu Dhabi. The 2009 Abu Dhabi Grand Prix was the first major event to take place on the circuit.

In June 2021, Saif Al Noaimi, acting CEO of Abu Dhabi Motorsports Management, announced that modifications to the track's Grand Prix layout had been approved, with the modifications being completed in time for the 2021 Abu Dhabi Grand Prix. The turn 5–6 chicane and turn 7 hairpin were replaced by a single, widened hairpin, now turn 5; the triple chicane and 90 degree left hander at turns 11–14 were replaced by a single, sweeping banked curve, now turn 9; and the radiuses of turns 17–19 (now 12–14), and the penultimate turn 20 (now 15), were widened to allow cars to carry more speed through the third sector.

=== Gallery ===
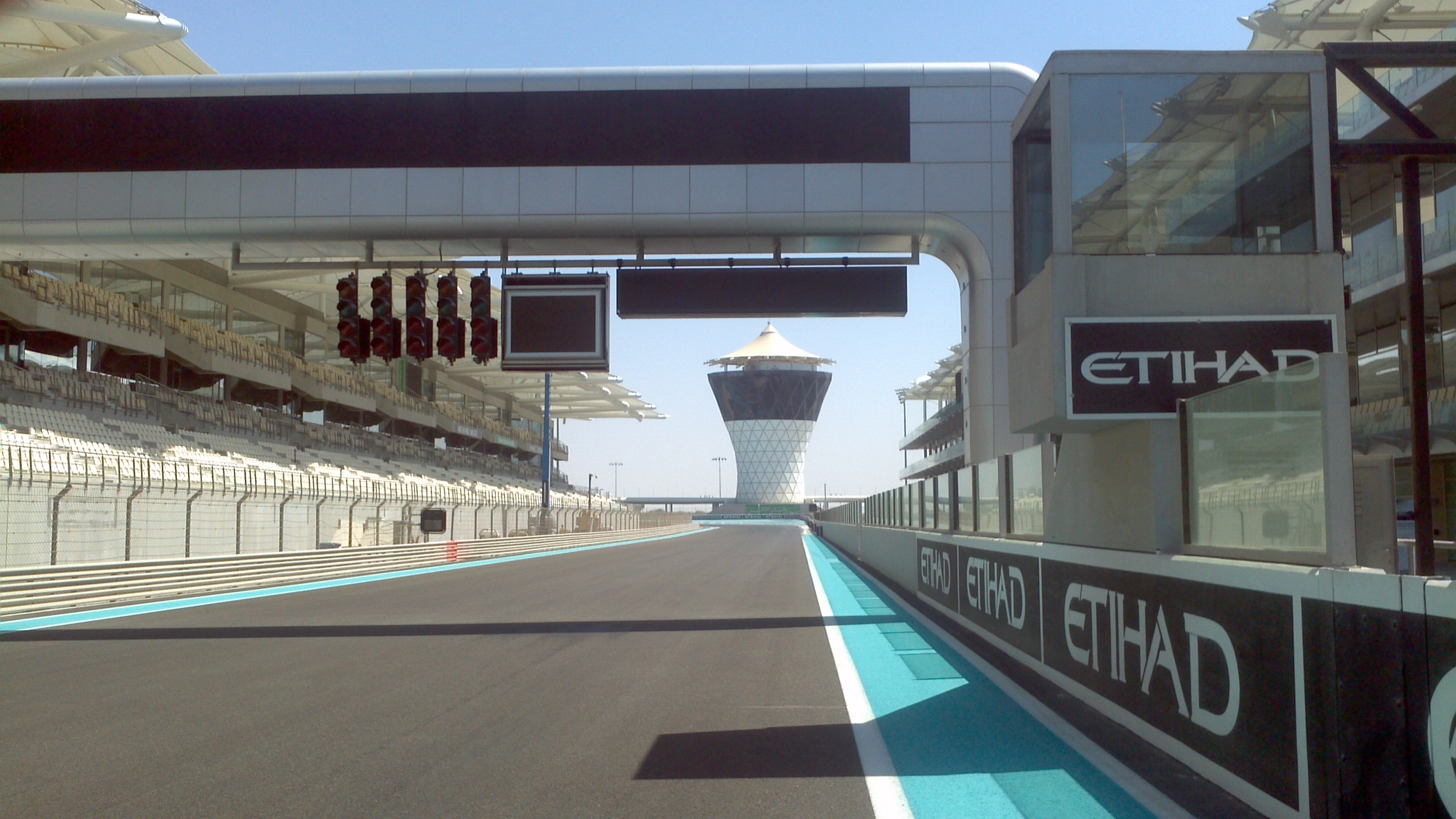
The main straight

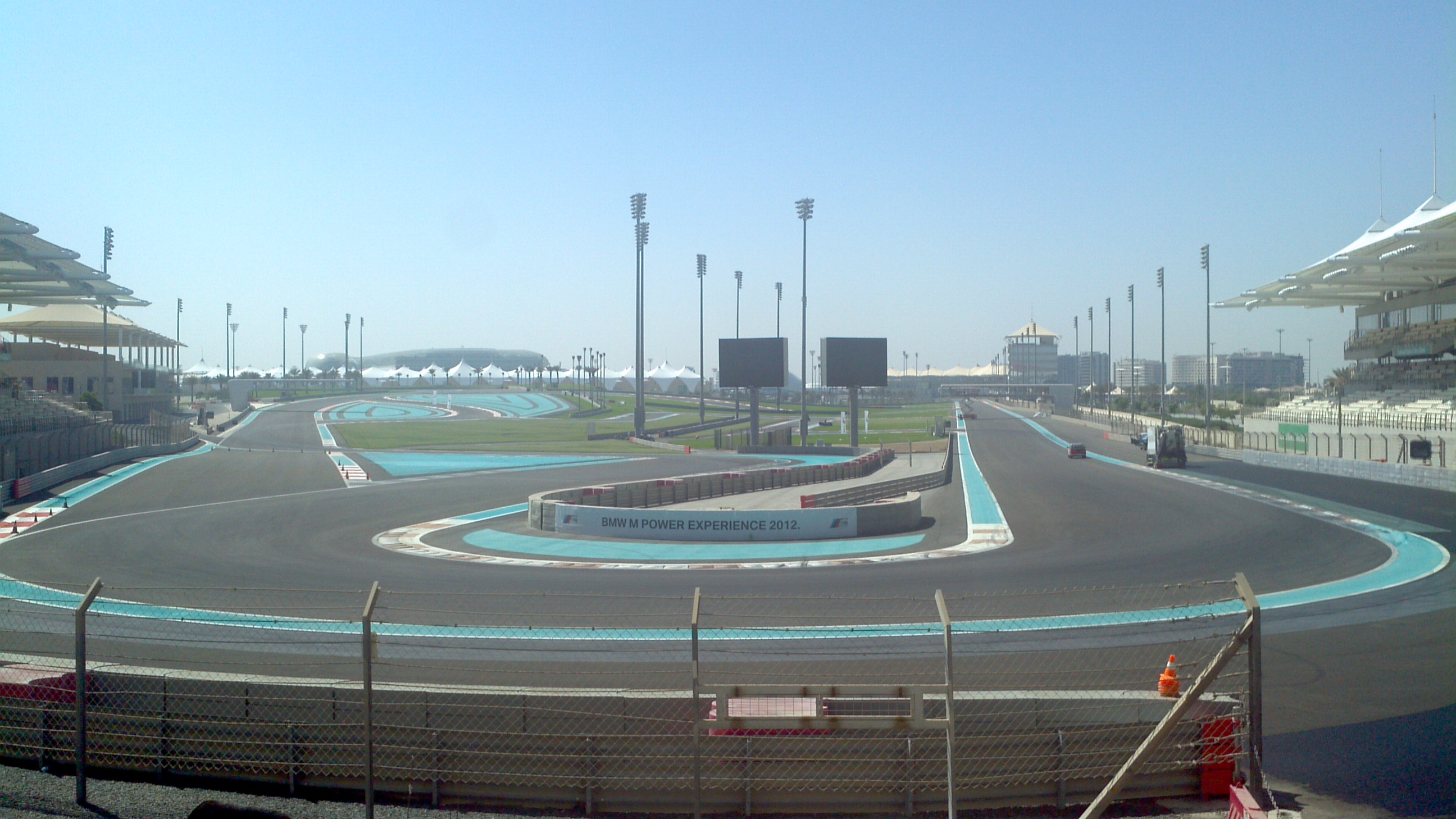
Turn 7 (2009–2021), Turn 5 (2021–present)

Grand Prix Circuit (2009–2021)

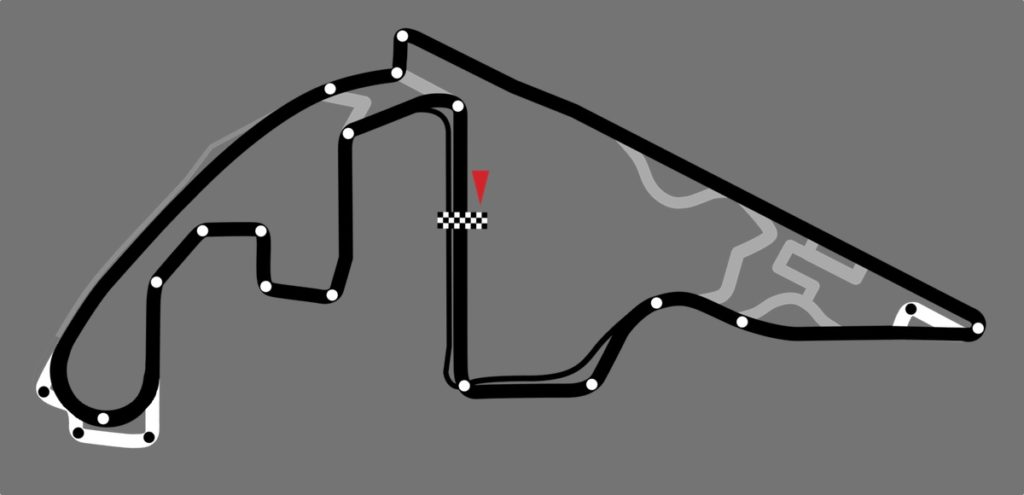
Differences between the 2009 and 2021 layouts

== Winners ==
=== By year ===
Year	Driver	Constructor	Report
2009	(Germany) Sebastian Vettel	Red Bull Racing-Renault	Report
2010	(Germany) Sebastian Vettel	Red Bull Racing-Renault	Report
2011	(United Kingdom) Lewis Hamilton	McLaren-Mercedes	Report
2012	(Finland) Kimi Räikkönen	Lotus-Renault	Report
2013	(Germany) Sebastian Vettel	Red Bull Racing-Renault	Report
2014	(United Kingdom) Lewis Hamilton	Mercedes	Report
2015	(Germany) Nico Rosberg	Mercedes	Report
2016	(United Kingdom) Lewis Hamilton	Mercedes	Report
2017	(Finland) Valtteri Bottas	Mercedes	Report
2018	(United Kingdom) Lewis Hamilton	Mercedes	Report
2019	(United Kingdom) Lewis Hamilton	Mercedes	Report
2020	(Netherlands) Max Verstappen	Red Bull Racing-Honda	Report
2021	(Netherlands) Max Verstappen	Red Bull Racing-Honda	Report
2022	(Netherlands) Max Verstappen	Red Bull Racing-RBPT	Report
2023	(Netherlands) Max Verstappen	Red Bull Racing-Honda RBPT	Report
2024	(United Kingdom) Lando Norris	McLaren-Mercedes	Report
2025	(Netherlands) Max Verstappen	Red Bull Racing-Honda RBPT	Report

=== Repeat winners (drivers) ===
Yas Marina Circuit layout used from 2009 to 2020

Drivers in bold are competing in the Formula One championship in 2026.

Wins	Driver	Years won
5	(United Kingdom) **Lewis Hamilton**	2011, 2014, 2016, 2018, 2019
5	(Netherlands) **Max Verstappen**	2020, 2021, 2022, 2023, 2025
3	(Germany) Sebastian Vettel	2009, 2010, 2013

=== Repeat winners (constructors) ===
Teams in bold are competing in the Formula One championship in 2026.

Wins	Constructor	Years won
8	(Austria) **Red Bull Racing**	2009, 2010, 2013, 2020, 2021, 2022, 2023, 2025
6	(Germany) **Mercedes**	2014, 2015, 2016, 2017, 2018, 2019
2	(United Kingdom) **McLaren**	2011, 2024

=== Repeat winners (engine manufacturers) ===
Manufacturers in bold are competing in the Formula One championship in 2026.

Wins	Manufacturer	Years won
8	(Germany) **Mercedes**	2011, 2014, 2015, 2016, 2017, 2018, 2019, 2024
4	(France) Renault	2009, 2010, 2012, 2013
2	**(Japan) Honda**	2020, 2021
2	(Japan) Honda RBPT	2023, 2025
