= 2023 Abu Dhabi Grand Prix =

Twenty-second round of the 2023 F1 season

Race 22 of 22 in the 2023 Formula One World Championship
← Previous race
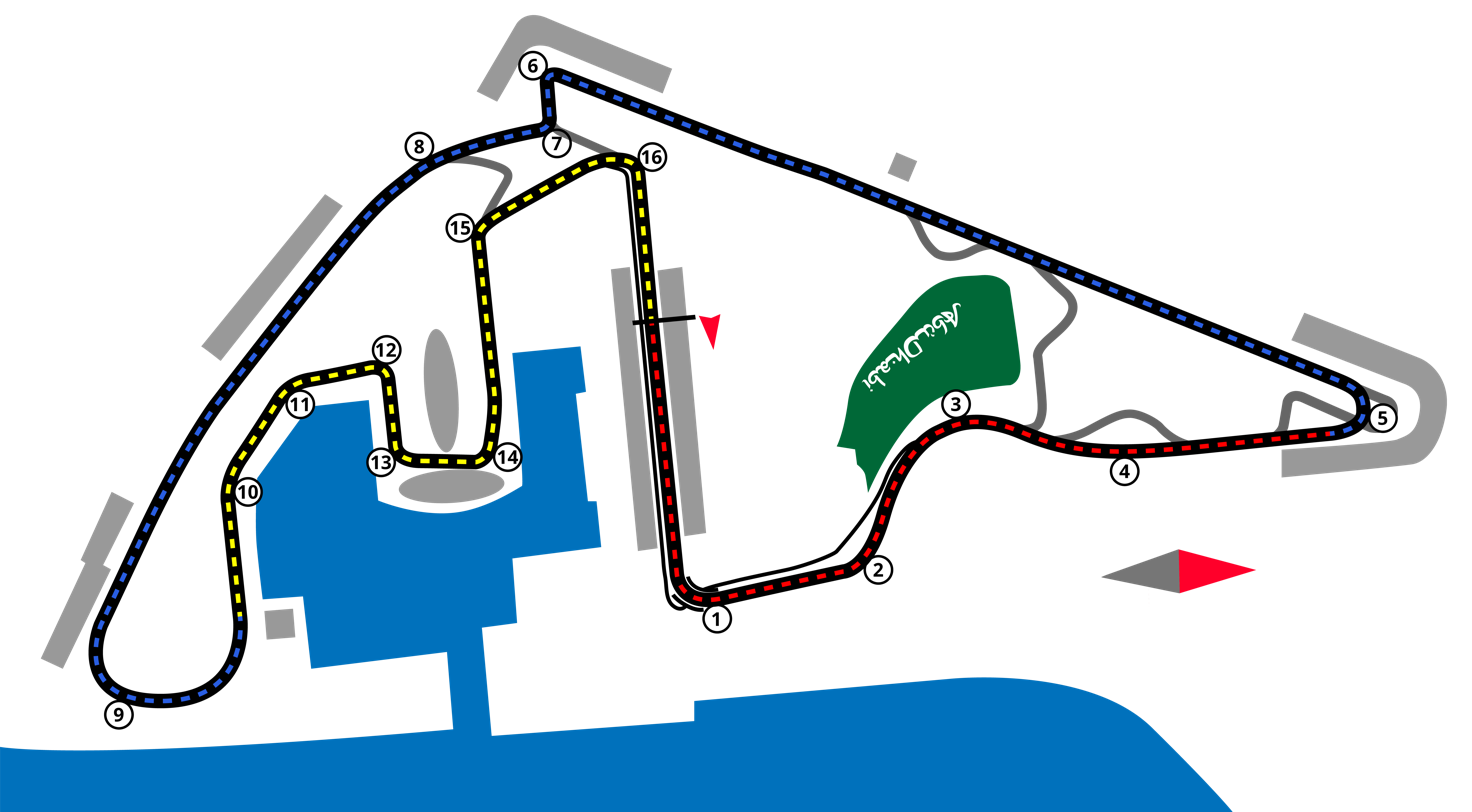
- Layout of the Yas Marina Circuit

Race details
- Date: 26 November 2023
- Official name: Formula 1 Etihad Airways Abu Dhabi Grand Prix 2023
- Location: Yas Marina Circuit; Abu Dhabi, United Arab Emirates
- Course: Permanent racing facility
- Course length: 5.281 km (3.281 miles)
- Distance: 58 laps, 306.183 km (190.253 miles)
- Weather: Clear
- Attendance: 170,000

Pole position
Driver	(Netherlands) Max Verstappen	Red Bull Racing-Honda RBPT
- Time: 1:23.445

Fastest lap
Driver	(Netherlands) Max Verstappen	Red Bull Racing-Honda RBPT
- Time: 1:26.993 on lap 45

Podium
First	(Netherlands) Max Verstappen	Red Bull Racing-Honda RBPT
Second	(Monaco) Charles Leclerc	Ferrari
Third	(United Kingdom) George Russell	Mercedes

The 2023 Abu Dhabi Grand Prix (officially known as the Formula 1 Etihad Airways Abu Dhabi Grand Prix 2023) was a Formula One motor race held on 26 November 2023 at the Yas Marina Circuit in Abu Dhabi, United Arab Emirates. It was the twenty-second and final round of the 2023 Formula One World Championship. The race was won by Max Verstappen ahead of Charles Leclerc and George Russell. Russell's podium placing allowed the Mercedes team to secure second position ahead of Ferrari.

== Background ==
The event was held across the weekend of 24–26 November. It was the twenty-second and final round of the 2023 Formula One World Championship and the fifteenth running of the Abu Dhabi Grand Prix.

=== Championship standings before the race ===
Coming into the weekend, Max Verstappen led the Drivers' Championship with 549 points. He led his teammate Sergio Pérez by 276 points and Lewis Hamilton by a further 41 points. Hamilton was ahead of Carlos Sainz Jr. in fourth by 32 points, tied with Fernando Alonso. Red Bull Racing led the Constructors' Championship with 822 points, 430 points ahead of Mercedes and a further four points ahead of Ferrari. McLaren, in fourth, was behind Ferrari by 104 points and ahead of Aston Martin, in fifth, by 11 points.

=== Entrants ===
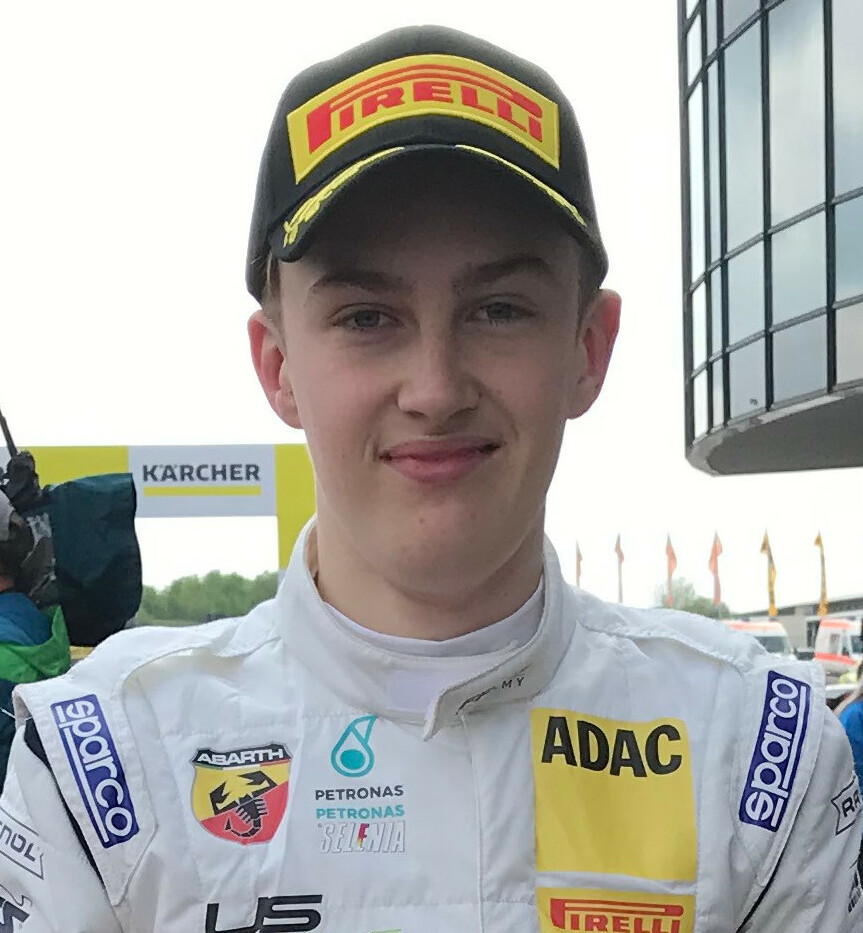
Théo Pourchaire

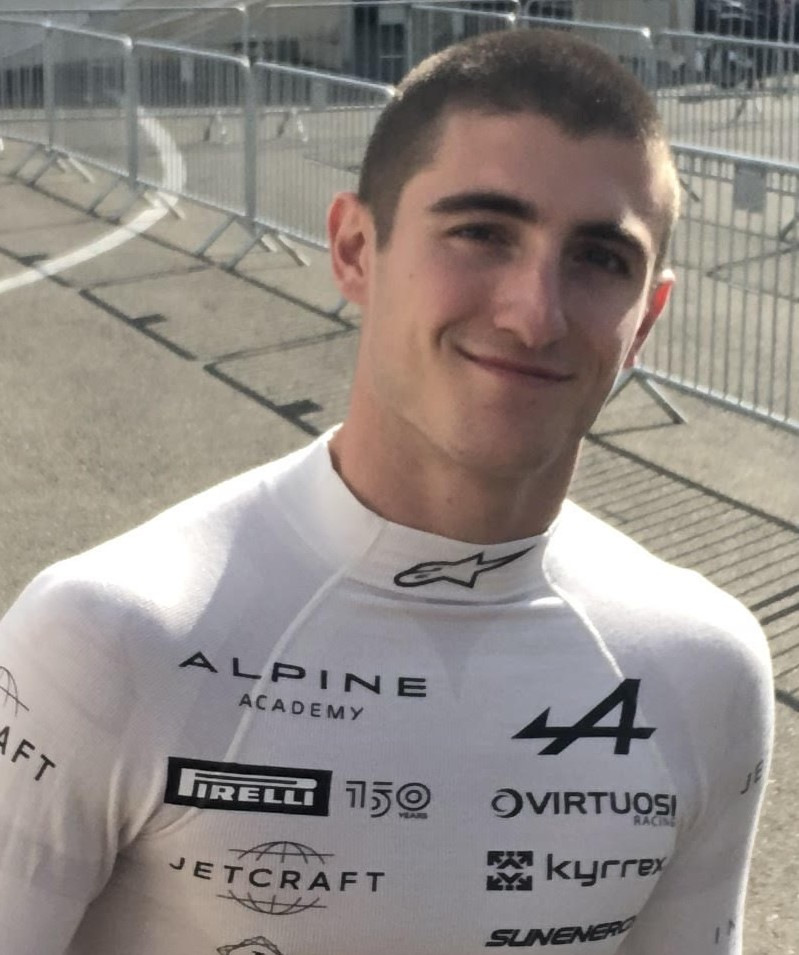
Jack Doohan

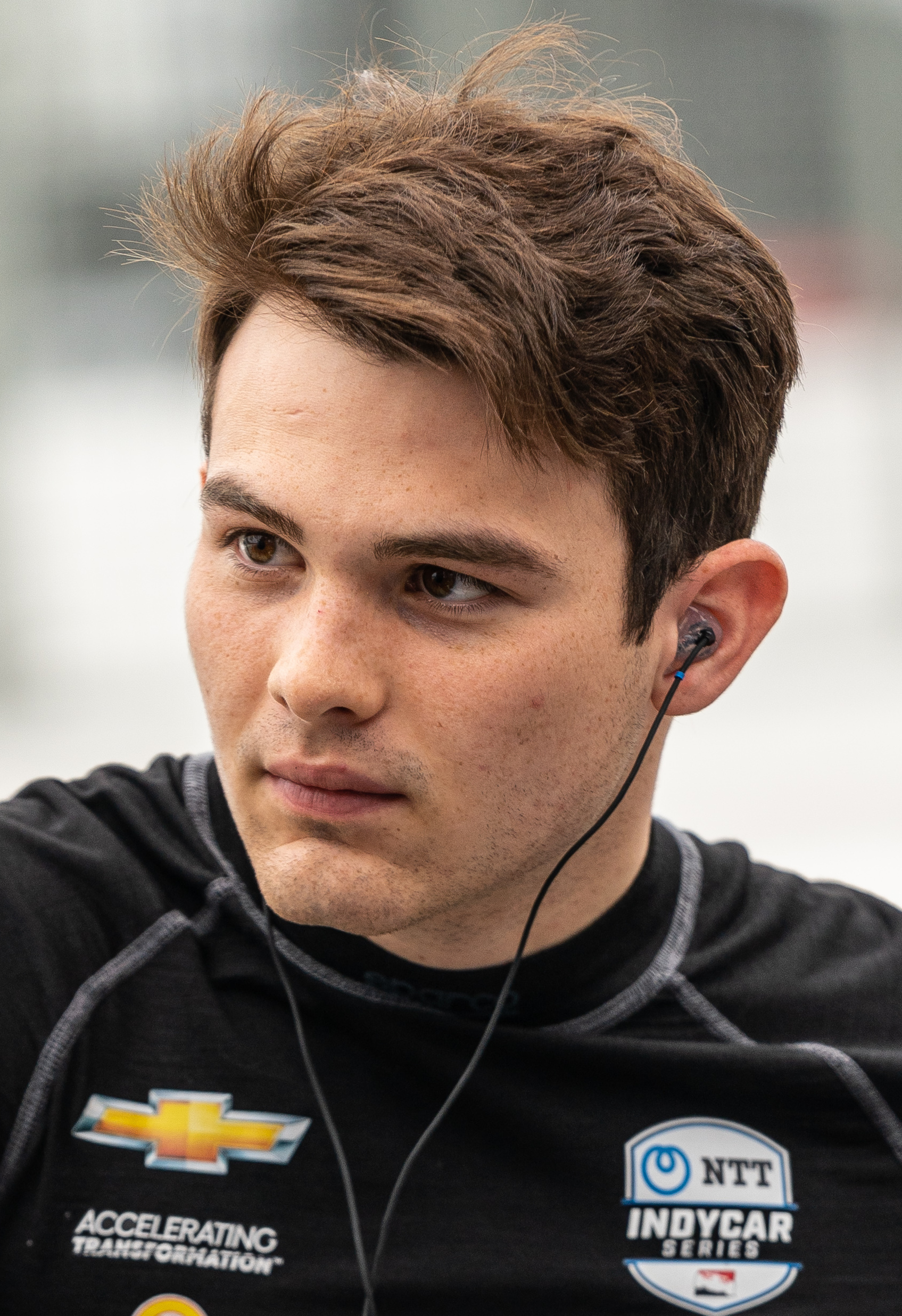
Patricio O'Ward

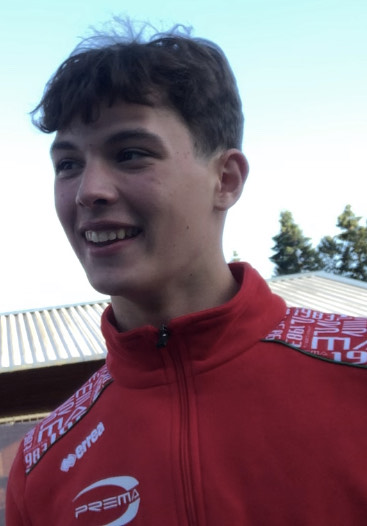
Oliver Bearman

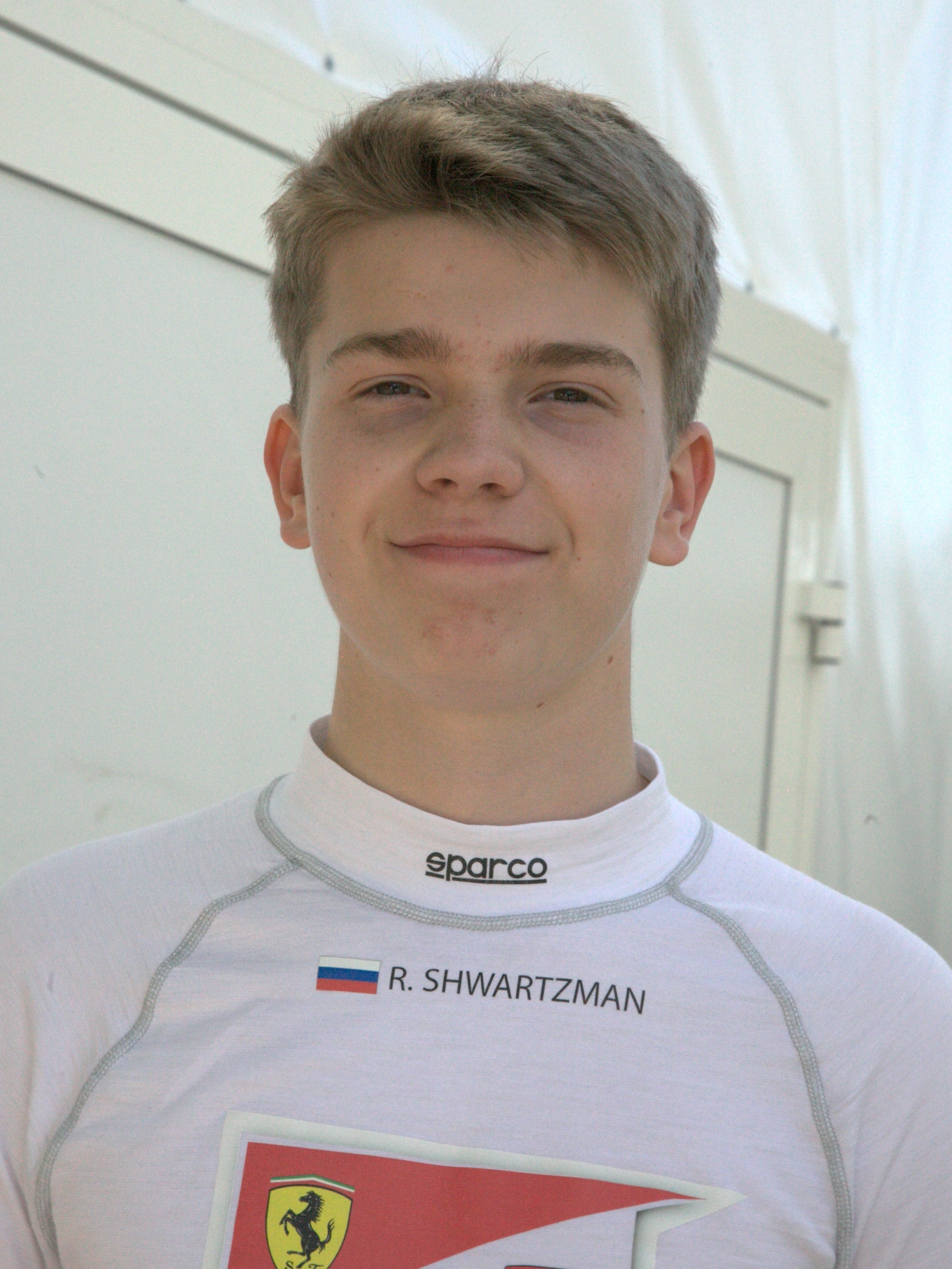
Robert Shwartzman

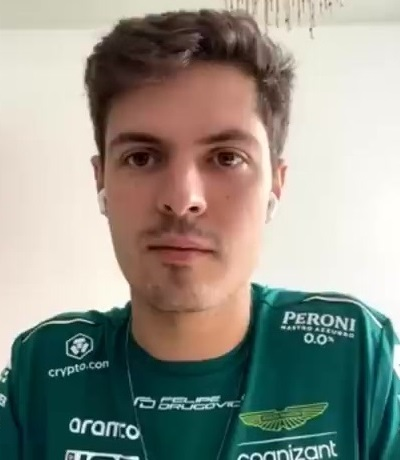
Felipe Drugovich

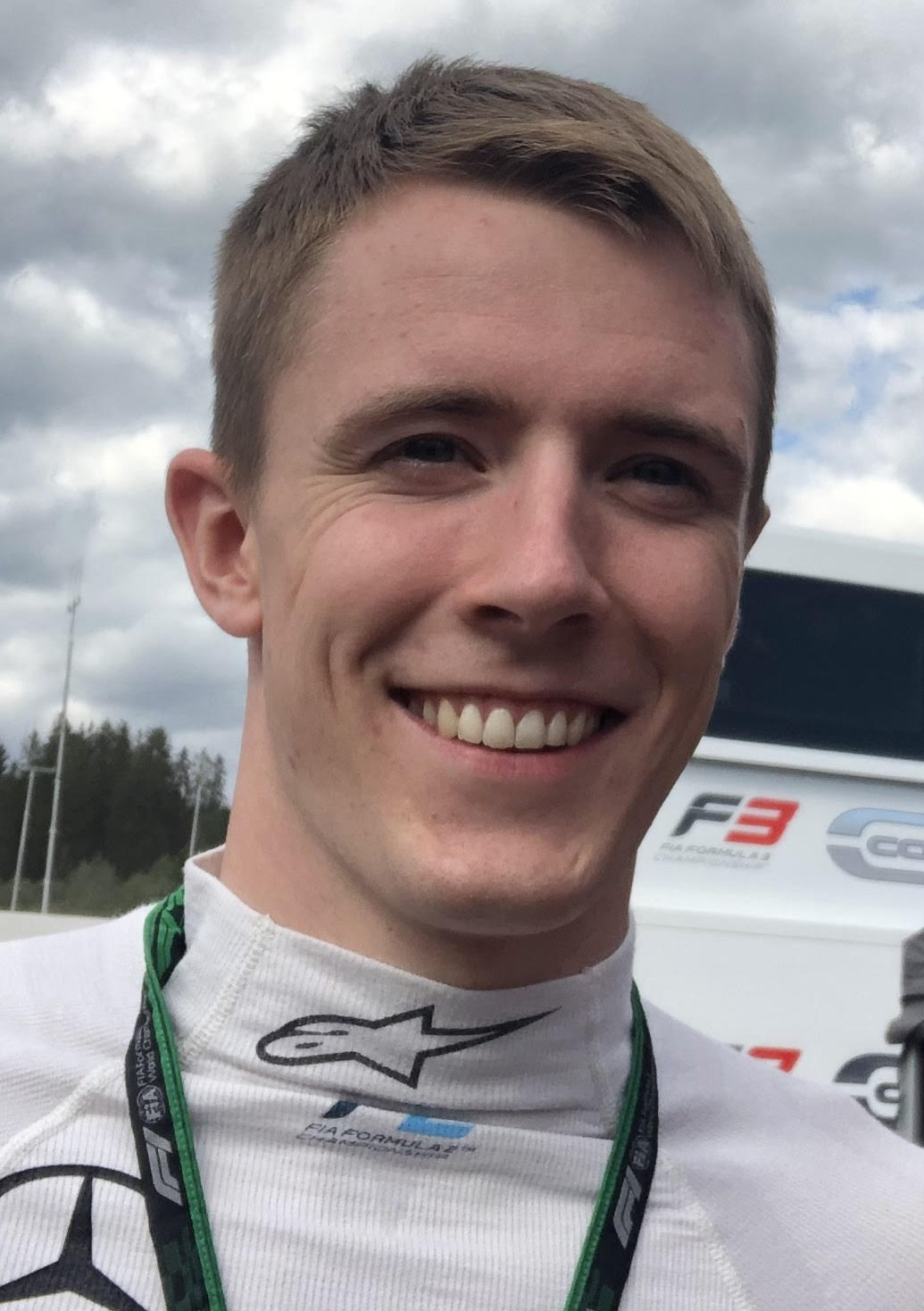
Frederik Vesti

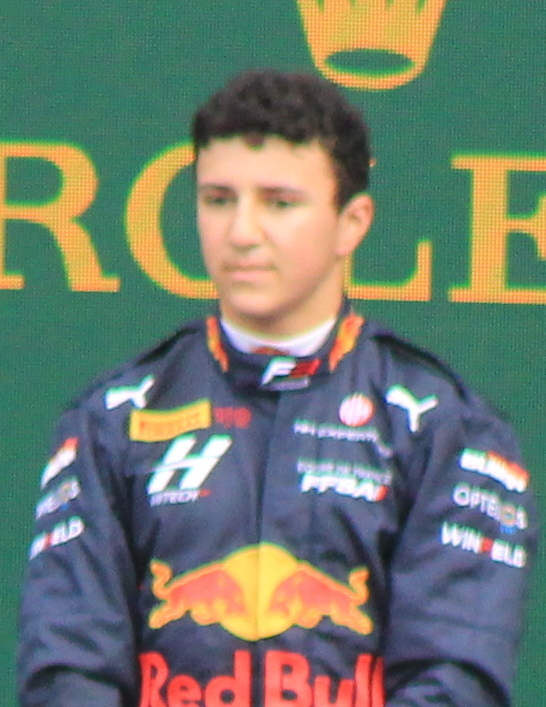
Isack Hadjar

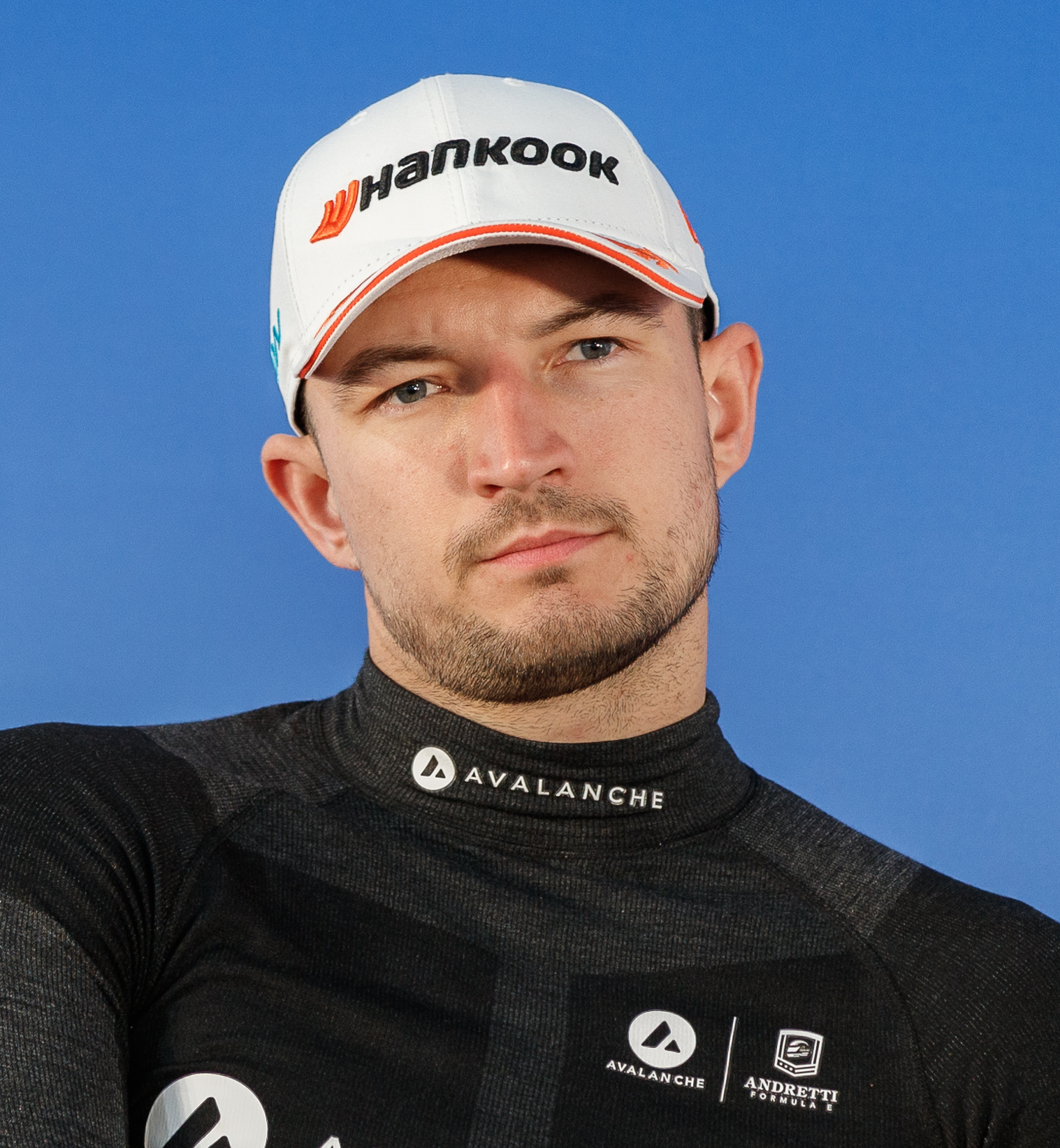
Jake Dennis

The nine drivers above and Zak O'Sullivan (not pictured) drove during the first free practice session.

The drivers and teams were the same as the season entry list with the exception of Daniel Ricciardo, who replaced Nyck de Vries at AlphaTauri starting at the Hungarian Grand Prix.

During the first practice session, nine teams fielded alternate drivers who had not raced in more than two Grands Prix, as required by the Formula One regulations:

- Théo Pourchaire for Alfa Romeo in place of Zhou Guanyu.
- Jack Doohan for Alpine in place of Esteban Ocon.
- Patricio O'Ward for McLaren in place of Lando Norris.
- Oliver Bearman for Haas in place of Nico Hülkenberg.
- Zak O'Sullivan for Williams in place of Alexander Albon.
- Robert Shwartzman for Ferrari in place of Charles Leclerc.
- Felipe Drugovich for Aston Martin in place of Fernando Alonso.
- Frederik Vesti for Mercedes in place of Lewis Hamilton.
- Isack Hadjar and Jake Dennis for Red Bull Racing in place of Sergio Pérez and Max Verstappen, respectively.

O'Sullivan and Dennis made their Formula One practice debut.

The Grand Prix marked the last race for AlphaTauri team principal Franz Tost, who was replaced by Laurent Mekies, as well as the last race for his former team under the AlphaTauri name, as they were renamed RB in 2024. It was also the last race for Alfa Romeo, who ended their partnership with Sauber ahead of their forthcoming partnership with Audi set to start in 2026. This Grand Prix also marked the last race for Haas's team principal Guenther Steiner, who was replaced by Ayao Komatsu.

=== Tyre choices ===
Tyre supplier Pirelli brought the C3, C4, and C5 tyre compounds (designated hard, medium, and soft, respectively), the three softest compounds in their dry tyre range, for teams to use at the event.

== Practice ==
Three free practice sessions were held for the event. The first free practice session was held on 24 November 2023, at 13:30 local time (UTC+4). It was topped by George Russell ahead of Felipe Drugovich and Daniel Ricciardo.

The second free practice session was held on the same day, at 17:00 local time (UTC+4). It was topped by Charles Leclerc ahead of Lando Norris and Max Verstappen. The session was stopped twice: Carlos Sainz Jr. lost control of his car into turn three suffering a heavy crash, and Nico Hülkenberg spun into the wall. The third free practice session was held on 25 November 2023, at 14:30 local time (UTC+4). It was topped by George Russell ahead of Lando Norris and Oscar Piastri.

== Qualifying ==
Qualifying was held on 25 November 2023, at 18:00 local time (UTC+4).

=== Qualifying classification ===
Pos.	No.	Driver	Constructor	Qualifying times			Final grid
Pos.	No.	Driver	Constructor	Q1	Q2	Q3	Final grid
1	1	(Netherlands) Max Verstappen	Red Bull Racing-Honda RBPT	1:24.160	1:23.740	1:23.445	1
2	16	(Monaco) Charles Leclerc	Ferrari	1:24.459	1:23.969	1:23.584	2
3	81	(Australia) Oscar Piastri	McLaren-Mercedes	1:24.487	1:24.278	1:23.782	3
4	63	(United Kingdom) George Russell	Mercedes	1:24.337	1:24.013	1:23.788	4
5	4	(United Kingdom) Lando Norris	McLaren-Mercedes	1:24.368	1:23.920	1:23.816	5
6	22	(Japan) Yuki Tsunoda	AlphaTauri-Honda RBPT	1:24.286	1:24.207	1:23.969	6
7	14	(Spain) Fernando Alonso	Aston Martin Aramco-Mercedes	1:24.501	1:24.131	1:24.084	7
8	27	(Germany) Nico Hülkenberg	Haas-Ferrari	1:24.425	1:24.213	1:24.108	8
9	11	(Mexico) Sergio Pérez	Red Bull Racing-Honda RBPT	1:24.209	1:24.116	1:24.171	9
10	10	(France) Pierre Gasly	Alpine-Renault	1:24.600	1:24.078	1:24.548	10
11	44	(United Kingdom) Lewis Hamilton	Mercedes	1:24.437	1:24.359	N/A	11
12	31	(France) Esteban Ocon	Alpine-Renault	1:24.565	1:24.391	N/A	12
13	18	(Canada) Lance Stroll	Aston Martin Aramco-Mercedes	1:24.405	1:24.422	N/A	13
14	23	(Thailand) Alexander Albon	Williams-Mercedes	1:24.298	1:24.439	N/A	14
15	3	(Australia) Daniel Ricciardo	AlphaTauri-Honda RBPT	1:24.461	1:24.442	N/A	15
16	55	(Spain) Carlos Sainz Jr.	Ferrari	1:24.738	N/A	N/A	16
17	20	(Denmark) Kevin Magnussen	Haas-Ferrari	1:24.764	N/A	N/A	17
18	77	(Finland) Valtteri Bottas	Alfa Romeo-Ferrari	1:24.788	N/A	N/A	18
19	24	(China) Zhou Guanyu	Alfa Romeo-Ferrari	1:25.159	N/A	N/A	19
107% time: 1:30.051
—	2	(United States) Logan Sargeant	Williams-Mercedes	No time	N/A	N/A	20^{1}

Notes

- ^1 – Logan Sargeant failed to set a time during qualifying. He was permitted to race at the stewards' discretion.

== Race ==
The race was held on 26 November 2023, at 17:00 local time (UTC+4), and was run for 58 laps.

=== Race report ===
At the start of the race, Charles Leclerc challenged Max Verstappen for the lead going into the first corner, Verstappen held on to first place. Verstappen slowly built a gap between himself and Leclerc, leaving Leclerc to hold off the McLaren pair close behind. Later in the race, every car that started on the medium tyre pitted except for Yuki Tsunoda, who briefly led the race until he pitted on lap 23. George Russell continued to hold on to third place behind Leclerc. In the final ten laps of the race, Sergio Pérez battled with Lando Norris for fourth place. The drivers banged wheels, and Pérez subsequently received a five-second time penalty for causing a collision.

Leclerc was comfortably in second place, but Russell's third place and Lewis Hamilton's ninth place were enough to keep Mercedes ahead of Ferrari by three points in the Constructors' Championship. Although Carlos Sainz Jr. was running in tenth place near the end of the race, he had only used a single tyre compound and needed to pit again, dropping him out of the points. With the race finish nearing, Pérez passed Russell but Russell continued to maintain a gap of under five seconds to hold on to third place after Pérez's penalty was applied. Leclerc deliberately slowed down to give Pérez a slipstream and eventually conceded second place, hoping it would push Russell out of third place. Still, Russell managed to stay close enough behind Leclerc, and finish in third after Pérez's penalty was applied.

The final podium consisted of Verstappen, Leclerc, and Russell; Russell's third place plus his teammate Hamilton finishing ninth and Carlos Sainz finishing 18th secured second place in the Constructors' Championship for Mercedes. Alonso's seventh-place finish was enough to secure fourth in the Drivers' Championship, his first top five finish in the championship since he was runner up in 2012 and 2013. Leclerc's second place promoted him from seventh to fifth for the season, level with Alonso on points, losing only by tiebreaker rules. Lando Norris's fifth place finish meant he equaled his best Drivers' Championship position of sixth from 2021, whilst Sainz's eighteenth place finish meant he fell from fourth to seventh in the drivers championship, his lowest finish since he finished tenth in 2018. Verstappen also became the first driver to surpass 1,000 laps led in a single season and the only driver to complete every racing lap in the 2023 season.

=== Race classification ===
Pos.	No.	Driver	Constructor	Laps	Time/Retired	Grid	Points
1	1	(Netherlands) Max Verstappen	Red Bull Racing-Honda RBPT	58	1:27:02.624	1	26^{a}
2	16	(Monaco) Charles Leclerc	Ferrari	58	+17.993	2	18
3	63	(United Kingdom) George Russell	Mercedes	58	+20.328	4	15
4	11	(Mexico) Sergio Pérez	Red Bull Racing-Honda RBPT	58	+21.453^{b}	9	12
5	4	(United Kingdom) Lando Norris	McLaren-Mercedes	58	+24.284	5	10
6	81	(Australia) Oscar Piastri	McLaren-Mercedes	58	+31.487	3	8
7	14	(Spain) Fernando Alonso	Aston Martin Aramco-Mercedes	58	+39.512	7	6
8	22	(Japan) Yuki Tsunoda	AlphaTauri-Honda RBPT	58	+43.088	6	4
9	44	(United Kingdom) Lewis Hamilton	Mercedes	58	+44.424	11	2
10	18	(Canada) Lance Stroll	Aston Martin Aramco-Mercedes	58	+55.632	13	1
11	3	(Australia) Daniel Ricciardo	AlphaTauri-Honda RBPT	58	+56.229	15	
12	31	(France) Esteban Ocon	Alpine-Renault	58	+1:06.373	12	
13	10	(France) Pierre Gasly	Alpine-Renault	58	+1:10.370	10	
14	23	(Thailand) Alexander Albon	Williams-Mercedes	58	+1:13.184	14	
15	27	(Germany) Nico Hülkenberg	Haas-Ferrari	58	+1:23.696	8	
16	2	(United States) Logan Sargeant	Williams-Mercedes	58	+1:27.791	20	
17	24	(China) Zhou Guanyu	Alfa Romeo-Ferrari	58	+1:29.422	19	
18^{c}	55	(Spain) Carlos Sainz Jr.	Ferrari	57	Engine	16	
19	77	(Finland) Valtteri Bottas	Alfa Romeo-Ferrari	57	+1 lap	18	
20	20	(Denmark) Kevin Magnussen	Haas-Ferrari	57	+1 lap	17	
Fastest lap: (Netherlands) Max Verstappen (Red Bull Racing-Honda RBPT) – 1:26.993 (lap 45)

Notes

- ^a – Includes one point for fastest lap.
- ^b – Sergio Pérez finished second, but he received a five-second time penalty for causing a collision with Lando Norris.
- ^c – Carlos Sainz Jr. was classified as he completed more than 90% of the race distance.

== Final championship standings ==
Drivers' Championship standings

	Pos.	Driver	Points
	1	(Netherlands) **Max Verstappen***	575
	2	(Mexico) Sergio Pérez	285
	3	(United Kingdom) Lewis Hamilton	234
1	4	(Spain) Fernando Alonso	206
2	5	(Monaco) Charles Leclerc	206

Constructors' Championship standings

Pos.	Constructor	Points
1	(Austria) **Red Bull Racing-Honda RBPT***	860
2	(Germany) Mercedes	409
3	(Italy) Ferrari	406
4	(United Kingdom) McLaren-Mercedes	302
5	(United Kingdom) Aston Martin Aramco-Mercedes	280

- Note: Only the top five positions are included for both sets of standings.
- Competitors in bold and marked with an asterisk are the 2023 World Champions.

== See also ==
- 2023 Yas Island Formula 2 round

Previous race: 2023 Las Vegas Grand Prix	FIA Formula One World Championship; 2023 season	Next race: 2024 Bahrain Grand Prix
Previous race: 2022 Abu Dhabi Grand Prix	Abu Dhabi Grand Prix	Next race: 2024 Abu Dhabi Grand Prix
