= 2016 Abu Dhabi Grand Prix =

Final Formula 1 race of 2016

Race 21 of 21 in the 2016 Formula One World Championship
← Previous race	Next race →

Race details
- Date: 27 November 2016
- Official name: 2016 Formula 1 Etihad Airways Abu Dhabi Grand Prix
- Location: Yas Marina Circuit, Abu Dhabi, United Arab Emirates
- Course: Permanent racing facility
- Course length: 5.554 km (3.451 miles)
- Distance: 55 laps, 305.470 km (189.810 miles)
- Weather: Sunny
- Attendance: 195,000 (Weekend)

Pole position
Driver	(United Kingdom) Lewis Hamilton	Mercedes
- Time: 1:38.755

Fastest lap
Driver	(Germany) Sebastian Vettel	Ferrari
- Time: 1:43.729 on lap 43

Podium
First	(United Kingdom) Lewis Hamilton	Mercedes
Second	(Germany) Nico Rosberg	Mercedes
Third	(Germany) Sebastian Vettel	Ferrari

The 2016 Abu Dhabi Grand Prix (officially known as the 2016 Formula 1 Etihad Airways Abu Dhabi Grand Prix) was a Formula One motor race held on 27 November 2016 at the Yas Marina Circuit in Abu Dhabi, United Arab Emirates. The race was the twenty-first and final round of the 2016 FIA Formula One World Championship and determined the 2016 World Drivers' Championship. It marked the eighth running of the Abu Dhabi Grand Prix and the eighth time that the race had been run as a World Championship event since the inaugural race in 2009.

The previous year's race winner Nico Rosberg entered the round with a twelve-point lead over his teammate Lewis Hamilton in the World Drivers' Championship. Their team, Mercedes, held a lead of two hundred and seventy-six points over Red Bull Racing in the World Constructors' Championship. Rosberg required a podium finish to secure the championship; Hamilton required a podium to remain in mathematical contention. Hamilton started the race from pole and went on to win the race, while Rosberg finished second, securing his only World Drivers' Championship title. Sebastian Vettel completed the podium in third.

A week after the Grand Prix, Rosberg announced his retirement from Formula One, making this Grand Prix his last. This was also the last Grand Prix for the Manor team, as the team folded before the start of the 2017 season, reducing the grid to 20 drivers. As well as being Rosberg's last Grand Prix, this would also prove to be the last Grand Prix for Esteban Gutiérrez and Felipe Nasr. This was expected to be the final Grand Prix for Jenson Button though he would later deputise for Fernando Alonso at the 2017 Monaco Grand Prix.

== Report ==
=== Background ===
Lewis Hamilton entered the final race of the season 12 points behind Nico Rosberg, therefore both came into the final race with a possibility of winning the world championship.

	Rosberg would have won if:	
	(Germany) Nico Rosberg	(United Kingdom) Lewis Hamilton
Pos.	1st, 2nd or 3rd	Does not matter
Pos.	4th, 5th or 6th	2nd or lower
Pos.	7th or 8th	3rd or lower
Pos.	9th or 10th	4th or lower
Pos.	11th or lower	5th or lower

	Hamilton would have won if:	
	(United Kingdom) Lewis Hamilton	(Germany) Nico Rosberg
Pos.	1st	4th or lower
Pos.	2nd	7th or lower
Pos.	3rd	9th or lower
Pos.	4th	11th or lower

=== Race ===
Lewis Hamilton held the lead from a cautious Nico Rosberg at the first corner of the race. Kimi Räikkönen gained third position from Daniel Ricciardo, with Vettel, Pérez, Hülkenberg, Alonso, Massa and Bottas completing the top ten positions at the end of the first lap. Max Verstappen spun and fell to 19th position after gently touching Nico Hülkenberg's Force India at the start. The RBR cars started the race on the more durable super soft tyres unlike the other top 10 cars who all started on ultra softs. By the 5th lap of the race, Verstappen had recovered to 13th position and only 19 seconds behind the leader, Hamilton.

Kevin Magnussen, who had pitted in the first lap with a broken nose after a touch in the start, retired from the race on lap 5 with suspension damage. The Force India and Williams teammates were fighting hard for 6th and 9th positions, respectively with Alonso holding position between the two teams' drivers. Bottas was forced to retire on lap 6 with a suspension issue.

Mercedes and Ferrari brought their lead cars (Hamilton and Räikkönen) in for their first pitstop on lap 7, and their following cars (Rosberg and Vettel) in subsequent laps. Red Bull also chose to react by pitting Ricciardo at this time, fitting the yellow-walled Soft tyres as did all the other front running cars at this point. The Mercedes of Rosberg had a 1.6s gap to the Ferrari of Räikkönen and maintained his position to the Ferrari after the pit stop, but now finding the yet to pit Red Bull of Verstappen between himself and Hamilton leading the race.

In what was at the time expected to be his last Formula One race, Jenson Button was forced to retire with broken right front suspension on lap 12 from 8th position. Daniil Kvyat was the next retirement from the race with gearbox problems on lap 14, from 16th position.

Meanwhile, Rosberg was advised by the Mercedes pitwall to not take any risks with Verstappen, believing that he will pit soon allowing Rosberg to emerge back into clean air. However, RBR took advantage of this conservative approach from Mercedes and chose to run Verstappen as long as they could in the first stint in order to complete the race on a 1-stop strategy and holding up Rosberg in the process. The risk posed by Verstappen's strategy to Rosberg became apparent soon, with Räikkönen following Rosberg close by and Vettel fast approaching this group. Rosberg was urged to attack and pass Verstappen on track, which he managed to do on lap 20 and began to catch Hamilton, with Räikkönen having pitted by lap 25 to cover for Verstappen and Ricciardo, who both pitted on laps 22 and 24 respectively.

The Mercedes drivers pitted on laps 28 and 29 for their final stint on the soft tyres. Rosberg now had a safe gap of 4 seconds to Verstappen, with Ricciardo and Räikkönen further behind. However, now Vettel was leading the race and going longer than all of the front runners with a view to driving a short final stint on the faster red–walled super soft tyres, while all other drivers were on the slower and older soft tyres. With Vettel yet to stop for the last time, Mercedes had concerns about the slow pace of Hamilton who was lapping as fast as Vettel who driving on much older tyres in the 1min46s, asking on lap 32: “Just wondering why you’re so slow? Currently unsafe to Vettel.” Hamilton immediately responded with a 1min45.3s, to which his race engineer replied that they were happy with this pace. Rosberg protested on lap 35 that this pace is too slow for a late race safety car. With 18 laps remaining, Vettel pitted to take the super soft tyres. He fell to 6th place, however his pace was alarming to Mercedes. At lap 41, Hamilton inquired the Mercedes pit wall about the pace of the cars around them. Vettel had lapped at 1min44.6s, and a 1-stopping Verstappen was much slower at 1min45.9s. Hamilton now began to slow the pace down much more dramatically, lapping in the 1min46s, in a bid to allow the chasing group to catch up to them while holding Rosberg around 1 second behind - the difficult to overtake layout of the track helping Hamilton not being overtaken himself. At this point individuals within the Mercedes pit wall, namely his race engineer and the team Executive Director Paddy Lowe began to issue repeated orders to Hamilton to increase his pace, but Hamilton continued to rebuff their requests.

Shortly after, as the leaders were lapping Carlos Sainz Jr and Jolyon Palmer, the Renault driver missed the braking point and rear-ended the Toro Rosso of the Spaniard. Sainz Jr suffered problems due to this contact and retired from the race. Palmer was penalized with 5 seconds for the incident.

Vettel passed Räikkönen, Ricciardo and Verstappen and was less than a second behind Rosberg by lap 50. Hamilton's actions also allowed Verstappen who was 3.5 seconds away from Rosberg to be 1 second behind Vettel by this time.

In the penultimate lap, Vettel attacked Rosberg, who defended his position, with RBR also encouraging Verstappen to push up to Vettel's DRS to take advantage of a mistake by Vettel or Rosberg. Had Rosberg been passed by both Vettel and Verstappen, Hamilton would have won the World Championship Drivers' title and denied Rosberg his first title. Toto Wolff, the Mercedes Team Principal was able to see two sides to Hamilton's actions, while not condoning his insubordination, understood the racer's mentality in this situation. Others have supported him, going with the principle that "drivers are free to race".

== Classification ==
=== Qualifying ===
Pos.	Car no.	Driver	Constructor	Qualifying times			Final grid
Pos.	Car no.	Driver	Constructor	Q1	Q2	Q3	Final grid
1	44	(United Kingdom) Lewis Hamilton	Mercedes	1:39.487	1:39.382	1:38.755	1
2	6	(Germany) Nico Rosberg	Mercedes	1:40.511	1:39.490	1:39.058	2
3	3	(Australia) Daniel Ricciardo	Red Bull Racing-TAG Heuer	1:41.002	1:40.429	1:39.589	3
4	7	(Finland) Kimi Räikkönen	Ferrari	1:40.338	1:39.629	1:39.604	4
5	5	(Germany) Sebastian Vettel	Ferrari	1:40.341	1:40.034	1:39.661	5
6	33	(Netherlands) Max Verstappen	Red Bull Racing-TAG Heuer	1:40.424	1:39.903	1:39.818	6
7	27	(Germany) Nico Hülkenberg	Force India-Mercedes	1:41.000	1:40.709	1:40.501	7
8	11	(Mexico) Sergio Pérez	Force India-Mercedes	1:40.864	1:40.743	1:40.519	8
9	14	(Spain) Fernando Alonso	McLaren-Honda	1:41.616	1:41.044	1:41.106	9
10	19	(Brazil) Felipe Massa	Williams-Mercedes	1:41.157	1:40.858	1:41.213	10
11	77	(Finland) Valtteri Bottas	Williams-Mercedes	1:41.192	1:41.084		11
12	22	(United Kingdom) Jenson Button	McLaren-Honda	1:41.158	1:41.272		12
13	21	(Mexico) Esteban Gutiérrez	Haas-Ferrari	1:41.639	1:41.480		13
14	8	(France) Romain Grosjean	Haas-Ferrari	1:41.467	1:41.564		14
15	30	(United Kingdom) Jolyon Palmer	Renault	1:41.775	1:41.820		15
16	94	(Germany) Pascal Wehrlein	MRT-Mercedes	1:41.886	1:41.995		16
17	26	(Russia) Daniil Kvyat	Toro Rosso-Ferrari	1:42.003			17
18	20	(Denmark) Kevin Magnussen	Renault	1:42.142			18
19	12	(Brazil) Felipe Nasr	Sauber-Ferrari	1:42.247			19
20	31	(France) Esteban Ocon	MRT-Mercedes	1:42.286			20
21	55	(Spain) Carlos Sainz Jr.	Toro Rosso-Ferrari	1:42.393			21
22	9	(Sweden) Marcus Ericsson	Sauber-Ferrari	1:42.637			22
107% time: 1:46.451

=== Race ===
Pos.	No.	Driver	Constructor	Laps	Time/Retired	Grid	Points
1	44	(United Kingdom) Lewis Hamilton	Mercedes	55	1:38:04.013	1	25
2	6	(Germany) Nico Rosberg	Mercedes	55	+0.439	2	18
3	5	(Germany) Sebastian Vettel	Ferrari	55	+0.843	5	15
4	33	(Netherlands) Max Verstappen	Red Bull Racing-TAG Heuer	55	+1.685	6	12
5	3	(Australia) Daniel Ricciardo	Red Bull Racing-TAG Heuer	55	+5.315	3	10
6	7	(Finland) Kimi Räikkönen	Ferrari	55	+18.816	4	8
7	27	(Germany) Nico Hülkenberg	Force India-Mercedes	55	+50.114	7	6
8	11	(Mexico) Sergio Pérez	Force India-Mercedes	55	+58.776	8	4
9	19	(Brazil) Felipe Massa	Williams-Mercedes	55	+59.436	10	2
10	14	(Spain) Fernando Alonso	McLaren-Honda	55	+59.896	9	1
11	8	(France) Romain Grosjean	Haas-Ferrari	55	+1:16.777	14	
12	21	(Mexico) Esteban Gutiérrez	Haas-Ferrari	55	+1:35.113	13	
13	31	(France) Esteban Ocon	MRT-Mercedes	54	+1 Lap	20	
14	94	(Germany) Pascal Wehrlein	MRT-Mercedes	54	+1 Lap	16	
15	9	(Sweden) Marcus Ericsson	Sauber-Ferrari	54	+1 Lap	22	
16	12	(Brazil) Felipe Nasr	Sauber-Ferrari	54	+1 Lap	19	
17	30	(United Kingdom) Jolyon Palmer	Renault	54	+1 Lap^{1}	15	
Ret	55	(Spain) Carlos Sainz Jr.	Toro Rosso-Ferrari	41	Collision damage	21	
Ret	26	(Russia) Daniil Kvyat	Toro Rosso-Ferrari	14	Gearbox	17	
Ret	22	(United Kingdom) Jenson Button	McLaren-Honda	12	Suspension	12	
Ret	77	(Finland) Valtteri Bottas	Williams-Mercedes	6	Suspension	11	
Ret	20	(Denmark) Kevin Magnussen	Renault	5	Suspension	18	

Notes

- ^1 – Jolyon Palmer received a 5-second penalty for causing a collision with Carlos Sainz Jr. His final position was left unchanged due to him being classified in the last position anyway.

== Final Championship standings ==
Drivers' Championship standings

Pos.	Driver	Points
1	(Germany) **Nico Rosberg**	385
2	(United Kingdom) Lewis Hamilton	380
3	(Australia) Daniel Ricciardo	256
4	(Germany) Sebastian Vettel	212
5	(Netherlands) Max Verstappen	204

Constructors' Championship standings

Pos.	Constructor	Points
1	(Germany) **Mercedes**	765
2	(Austria) Red Bull Racing-TAG Heuer	468
3	(Italy) Ferrari	398
4	Force India-Mercedes	173
5	(United Kingdom) Williams-Mercedes	138

- Note: Only the top five positions are included for the sets of standings.
- **Bold text** indicates the 2016 World Champions.

== See also ==
- 2016 Yas Marina GP2 Series round
- 2016 Yas Marina GP3 Series round

Previous race: 2016 Brazilian Grand Prix	FIA Formula One World Championship; 2016 season	Next race: 2017 Australian Grand Prix
Previous race: 2015 Abu Dhabi Grand Prix	Abu Dhabi Grand Prix	Next race: 2017 Abu Dhabi Grand Prix
