= 2022 Abu Dhabi Grand Prix =

Twenty-second round of the 2022 F1 season

Race 22 of 22 in the 2022 Formula One World Championship
← Previous race	Next race →
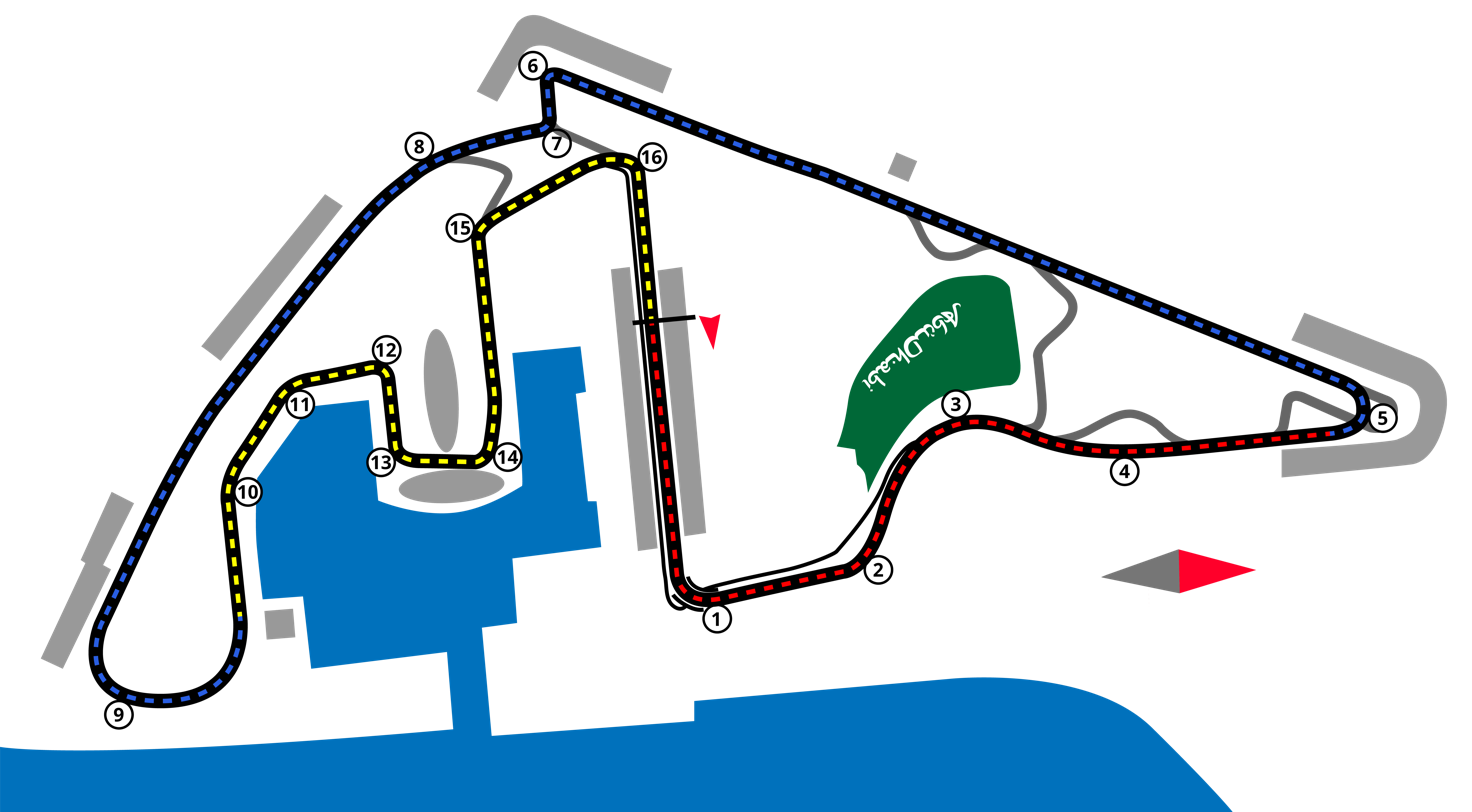
- Layout of the Yas Marina Circuit

Race details
- Date: 20 November 2022
- Official name: Formula 1 Etihad Airways Abu Dhabi Grand Prix 2022
- Location: Yas Marina Circuit; Abu Dhabi, United Arab Emirates
- Course: Permanent racing facility
- Course length: 5.281 km (3.281 miles)
- Distance: 58 laps, 306.183 km (190.253 miles)
- Weather: Clear
- Attendance: 160,000

Pole position
Driver	(Netherlands) Max Verstappen	Red Bull Racing-RBPT
- Time: 1:23.824

Fastest lap
Driver	(United Kingdom) Lando Norris	McLaren-Mercedes
- Time: 1:28.391 on lap 44

Podium
First	(Netherlands) Max Verstappen	Red Bull Racing-RBPT
Second	(Monaco) Charles Leclerc	Ferrari
Third	(Mexico) Sergio Pérez	Red Bull Racing-RBPT

The 2022 Abu Dhabi Grand Prix (officially known as the Formula 1 Etihad Airways Abu Dhabi Grand Prix 2022) was a Formula One motor race that was held on 20 November 2022 at the Yas Marina Circuit in Abu Dhabi, United Arab Emirates. Max Verstappen won the race ahead of Charles Leclerc and Sergio Pérez. Leclerc's finish ahead of Pérez decided the fight between the two for second in the Drivers' Championship in his favour. This was the 300th Grand Prix entry, and 299th and final Grand Prix start, for four-time World Champion Sebastian Vettel. Vettel would finish tenth during the race, scoring his last Formula One point.

== Background ==
The event was held across the weekend of the 18–20 November. It was the twenty-second and final race of the 2022 Formula One World Championship.

=== Championship standings before the race ===
Going into the weekend, both the Drivers' and Constructors' titles were already decided at the Japanese and United States Grands Prix, respectively. Max Verstappen led the Drivers' Championship with 429 points with Charles Leclerc, second, and Sergio Pérez, third, both with 290 points. Red Bull Racing led the Constructors' Championship from Ferrari by 195 points and Mercedes by 214 points.

=== Entrants ===
The drivers and teams were the same as the season entry list with no additional stand-in drivers for the race. Felipe Drugovich (Aston Martin), Pietro Fittipaldi (Haas), Patricio O'Ward (McLaren), Logan Sargeant (Williams), Jack Doohan (Alpine), Robert Kubica (Alfa Romeo), Robert Shwartzman (Ferrari) and Liam Lawson (Red Bull Racing) drove in the first practice session in place of Lance Stroll, Mick Schumacher, Lando Norris, Nicholas Latifi, Fernando Alonso, Zhou Guanyu, Carlos Sainz Jr. and Verstappen, respectively. In doing so, Drugovich and O'Ward made their Formula One practice debut.

The Grand Prix was the last for Aston Martin's Sebastian Vettel, who retired, as well as the last for McLaren's Daniel Ricciardo, Williams' Nicholas Latifi and Haas' Mick Schumacher, who were each unable to secure a race seat for 2023 although Ricciardo would later take Nyck de Vries' seat at Scuderia AlphaTauri before the 2023 Hungarian Grand Prix after de Vries was dropped by AlphaTauri due to him not scoring points during the first ten races of 2023. The Grand Prix was also the last for Fernando Alonso at Alpine and for Pierre Gasly at AlphaTauri before moving to Aston Martin and Alpine, respectively.

=== Tyre choices ===
Tyre supplier Pirelli brought the C3, C4, and C5 tyre compounds (designated hard, medium, and soft, respectively) for teams to use at the event.

=== Penalties ===
McLaren's Daniel Ricciardo carried a three-place grid penalty for causing a collision with Kevin Magnussen at the previous round, the São Paulo Grand Prix.

== Qualifying ==
=== Qualifying report ===
Kevin Magnussen, having taken his maiden pole position the previous race at the São Paulo Grand Prix, was eliminated in the first segment and he was out-qualified by outgoing Haas teammate Mick Schumacher for the sixth time out of 22. Sebastian Vettel believed he was impeded by Red Bull Racing drivers on three occasions; by Sergio Pérez in the first segment and twice by Max Verstappen during the second segment. Although Vettel argued that the infringements cost him "a tenth" of a second per lap, it did not prevent him from progressing from both those stages. He qualified ninth, equaling his season's best result.

Verstappen aided Pérez's attempt in the final segment by giving him a slipstream throughout the lap, as Red Bull Racing sought to provide Pérez with every opportunity to finish ahead of Charles Leclerc for second in the championship. It was Verstappen who took pole position, his seventh of the season, with Pérez qualifying second to give Red Bull Racing their first front-row lockout since the 2018 Mexican Grand Prix. The qualifying results also meant that seven-time world champion Lewis Hamilton failed to claim a pole position during a season for the first time in his Formula One career since it began in 2007, a record streak.

=== Qualifying classification ===
Pos.	No.	Driver	Constructor	Qualifying times			Final grid
Pos.	No.	Driver	Constructor	Q1	Q2	Q3	Final grid
1	1	(Netherlands) Max Verstappen	Red Bull Racing-RBPT	1:24.754	1:24.622	1:23.824	1
2	11	(Mexico) Sergio Pérez	Red Bull Racing-RBPT	1:24.820	1:24.419	1:24.052	2
3	16	(Monaco) Charles Leclerc	Ferrari	1:25.211	1:24.517	1:24.092	3
4	55	(Spain) Carlos Sainz Jr.	Ferrari	1:25.090	1:24.521	1:24.242	4
5	44	(United Kingdom) Lewis Hamilton	Mercedes	1:25.594	1:24.774	1:24.508	5
6	63	(United Kingdom) George Russell	Mercedes	1:25.545	1:24.940	1:24.511	6
7	4	(United Kingdom) Lando Norris	McLaren-Mercedes	1:25.387	1:24.903	1:24.769	7
8	31	(France) Esteban Ocon	Alpine-Renault	1:25.735	1:25.007	1:24.830	8
9	5	(Germany) Sebastian Vettel	Aston Martin Aramco-Mercedes	1:25.523	1:24.974	1:24.961	9
10	3	(Australia) Daniel Ricciardo	McLaren-Mercedes	1:25.766	1:25.068	1:25.045	13^{a}
11	14	(Spain) Fernando Alonso	Alpine-Renault	1:25.782	1:25.096	N/A	10
12	22	(Japan) Yuki Tsunoda	AlphaTauri-RBPT	1:25.630	1:25.219	N/A	11
13	47	(Germany) Mick Schumacher	Haas-Ferrari	1:25.711	1:25.225	N/A	12
14	18	(Canada) Lance Stroll	Aston Martin Aramco-Mercedes	1:25.741	1:25.359	N/A	14
15	24	(China) Zhou Guanyu	Alfa Romeo-Ferrari	1:25.594	1:25.408	N/A	15
16	20	(Denmark) Kevin Magnussen	Haas-Ferrari	1:25.834	N/A	N/A	16
17	10	(France) Pierre Gasly	AlphaTauri-RBPT	1:25.859	N/A	N/A	17
18	77	(Finland) Valtteri Bottas	Alfa Romeo-Ferrari	1:25.892	N/A	N/A	18
19	23	(Thailand) Alexander Albon	Williams-Mercedes	1:26.028	N/A	N/A	19
20	6	(Canada) Nicholas Latifi	Williams-Mercedes	1:26.054	N/A	N/A	20
107% time: 1:30.687

Notes

- ^a – Daniel Ricciardo received a three-place grid penalty for causing a collision with Kevin Magnussen at the previous round.

== Race ==
=== Race report ===
Lewis Hamilton got ahead of Carlos Sainz Jr. at the start and held it into turn six, when Sainz attempted to overtake Hamilton on the inside. Hamilton was forced wide and elected to cut the corner, going over the sausage kerb, allowing him to keep the position, going momentarily airborne. On lap five, Hamilton was instructed to let Sainz pass, and although they would continue to battle for a few laps, Sainz would pull away.

Hamilton's teammate, George Russell, was awarded a five-second time penalty for an unsafe release during his pit stop, having forced Lando Norris to brake to avoid a collision. This left Russell in sixth position after his second pit stop later in the race. On lap 27, Fernando Alonso retired from the race with a water leak. It was his fifth retirement due to a technical failure of the season, and his sixth overall. On lap 39, Mick Schumacher and Nicholas Latifi collided at turn 5, when Schumacher attempted to pass on the inside, spinning both and resulting in Latifi making contact with the barrier. Latifi would continue before retiring from the race with an electronics issue, while Schumacher was awarded a five-second time penalty.

The strategy battle saw a split between most teams; with Max Verstappen, Charles Leclerc, Sebastian Vettel, Daniel Ricciardo, Valtteri Bottas, Kevin Magnussen and Hamilton all employing a one-stop strategy while their teammates used a two-stop. Sergio Pérez pitted from second at the end of lap 33, rejoining in sixth. Despite the additional pace from fresher tyres, Pérez lost time behind lapped cars and during a battle with Hamilton, delaying his pursuit of Leclerc. On lap 55, Hamilton became stuck in seventh gear as his hydraulics system failed. This forced him into retirement, ending any chance Mercedes had of passing Ferrari for second in the Constructor's Championship. It also meant that, for the first time in Hamilton's 16-year career, he would go an entire season without recording a Grand Prix victory, a record streak.

Having led the race from the start, Verstappen won the Grand Prix by a comfortable margin, his third consecutive win in Abu Dhabi and his fifteenth of the season, extending his record. Leclerc held off Pérez to finish second, which allowed him to take second in the Drivers Championship by three points. Ricciardo (ninth) and Vettel (tenth) both scored points in their final race ahead of leaving the grid in 2023, although the former would eventually return for 8 races in 2023 and 18 races in 2024. This meant that 2022 was the first complete season in Vettel's career where he did not record a podium finish, excluding his one-race stint at BMW Sauber in 2007. Lance Stroll finished eighth, which was not enough for Aston Martin to claim sixth in the championship, finishing equal on points with Alfa Romeo, losing out on countback due to Alfa's best result of fifth versus Aston Martin's best result of sixth.

=== Race classification ===
Pos.	No.	Driver	Constructor	Laps	Time/Retired	Grid	Points
1	1	(Netherlands) Max Verstappen	Red Bull Racing-RBPT	58	1:27:45.914	1	25
2	16	(Monaco) Charles Leclerc	Ferrari	58	+8.771	3	18
3	11	(Mexico) Sergio Pérez	Red Bull Racing-RBPT	58	+10.093	2	15
4	55	(Spain) Carlos Sainz Jr.	Ferrari	58	+24.892	4	12
5	63	(United Kingdom) George Russell	Mercedes	58	+35.888	6	10
6	4	(United Kingdom) Lando Norris	McLaren-Mercedes	58	+56.234	7	9^{a}
7	31	(France) Esteban Ocon	Alpine-Renault	58	+57.240	8	6
8	18	(Canada) Lance Stroll	Aston Martin Aramco-Mercedes	58	+1:16.931	14	4
9	3	(Australia) Daniel Ricciardo	McLaren-Mercedes	58	+1:23.268	13	2
10	5	(Germany) Sebastian Vettel	Aston Martin Aramco-Mercedes	58	+1:23.898	9	1
11	22	(Japan) Yuki Tsunoda	AlphaTauri-RBPT	58	+1:29.371	11	
12	24	(China) Zhou Guanyu	Alfa Romeo-Ferrari	57	+1 lap	15	
13	23	(Thailand) Alexander Albon	Williams-Mercedes	57	+1 lap	19	
14	10	(France) Pierre Gasly	AlphaTauri-RBPT	57	+1 lap	17	
15	77	(Finland) Valtteri Bottas	Alfa Romeo-Ferrari	57	+1 lap	18	
16	47	(Germany) Mick Schumacher	Haas-Ferrari	57	+1 lap^{b}	12	
17	20	(Denmark) Kevin Magnussen	Haas-Ferrari	57	+1 lap	16	
18^{c}	44	(United Kingdom) Lewis Hamilton	Mercedes	55	Gearbox	5	
19^{c}	6	(Canada) Nicholas Latifi	Williams-Mercedes	55	Collision damage	20	
Ret	14	(Spain) Fernando Alonso	Alpine-Renault	27	Water leak	10	
Fastest lap: (United Kingdom) Lando Norris (McLaren-Mercedes) – 1:28.391 (lap 44)

Notes

- ^a – Includes one point for fastest lap.
- ^b – Mick Schumacher received a five-second time penalty for causing a collision with Nicholas Latifi. His final position was not affected by the penalty.
- ^c – Lewis Hamilton and Nicholas Latifi were classified as they completed more than 90% of the race distance.

== Final Championship standings ==
Drivers' Championship standings

	Pos.	Driver	Points
	1	(Netherlands) **Max Verstappen**	454
	2	(Monaco) Charles Leclerc	308
	3	(Mexico) Sergio Pérez	305
	4	(United Kingdom) George Russell	275
1	5	(Spain) Carlos Sainz Jr.	246

Constructors' Championship standings

Pos.	Constructor	Points
1	(Austria) **Red Bull Racing-RBPT**	759
2	(Italy) Ferrari	554
3	(Germany) Mercedes	515
4	(France) Alpine-Renault	173
5	(United Kingdom) McLaren-Mercedes	159

- Note: Only the top five positions are included for both sets of standings.
- Competitors in bold are the 2022 world champions.

== See also ==
- 2022 Yas Island Formula 2 round

Previous race: 2022 São Paulo Grand Prix	FIA Formula One World Championship; 2022 season	Next race: 2023 Bahrain Grand Prix
Previous race: 2021 Abu Dhabi Grand Prix	Abu Dhabi Grand Prix	Next race: 2023 Abu Dhabi Grand Prix
