= 2019 Abu Dhabi Grand Prix =

Race 21 of 21 in the 2019 Formula One World Championship
← Previous race

Race details
- Date: 1 December 2019
- Official name: Formula 1 Etihad Airways Abu Dhabi Grand Prix 2019
- Location: Yas Marina Circuit, Abu Dhabi, United Arab Emirates
- Course: Permanent racing facility
- Course length: 5.554 km (3.451 miles)
- Distance: 55 laps, 305.355 km (189.738 miles)
- Weather: Clear

Pole position
Driver	(United Kingdom) Lewis Hamilton	Mercedes
- Time: 1:34.779

Fastest lap
Driver	(United Kingdom) Lewis Hamilton	Mercedes
- Time: 1:39.283 on lap 53 (lap record)

Podium
First	(United Kingdom) Lewis Hamilton	Mercedes
Second	(Netherlands) Max Verstappen	Red Bull Racing-Honda
Third	(Monaco) Charles Leclerc	Ferrari

The 2019 Abu Dhabi Grand Prix (formally known as the Formula 1 Etihad Airways Abu Dhabi Grand Prix 2019) was a Formula One motor race that was held on 1 December 2019 at the Yas Marina Circuit in Abu Dhabi, United Arab Emirates. The race was the twenty first and final round of the 2019 Formula One World Championship and marked the eleventh running of the Abu Dhabi Grand Prix and the eleventh time that the race was run as a World Championship event since the inaugural event in 2009. This was also the first time that a race was held in December since the 1963 South African Grand Prix. It was the final race for Toro Rosso, as the team was rebranded to AlphaTauri for the 2020 season.

== Background ==
=== Championship standings before the race ===
Heading into the race weekend the top two places in the World Drivers' Championship had already been determined with Lewis Hamilton as champion ahead of teammate Valtteri Bottas. However third place was yet to be decided between Max Verstappen, 260 points and Charles Leclerc, 249 points, with Sebastian Vettel, 230 points, still able to overtake Leclerc for fourth place in the standings but too far behind Verstappen to take third. The top four places in the World Constructors' Championship were decided with Mercedes in first ahead of Ferrari, Red Bull and McLaren. Fifth place was still undecided with Renault eight points ahead of Toro Rosso.

=== Entries ===
The drivers and teams entered were the same as those for the previous race with no additional stand-in drivers for the race or practice. The race marked the final race for Toro Rosso, as the team was rebranded as AlphaTauri for the 2020 season. It would be also the final race for Robert Kubica, before he would also make his final two starts in the 2021 Dutch Grand Prix and the Italian Grand Prix.

== Practice ==
The first session saw the red flag come out twice. The first time when Daniel Ricciardo suffered an engine failure and a second time after Sebastian Vettel crashed his car at turn 19 in the closing minutes of the session, after which the session was not restarted. The session ended with Valtteri Bottas fastest followed by Max Verstappen and Lewis Hamilton. The second practice session saw one red flag after Bottas and Romain Grosjean collided at turn 11, Bottas would later receive a reprimand for the incident. Bottas finished the session fastest ahead of Hamilton and Charles Leclerc. The third practice session ran uninterrupted and ended with Verstappen fastest followed by Hamilton and Bottas.

== Qualifying ==
=== Qualifying classification ===
Pos.	No.	Driver	Constructor	Qualifying times			Final grid
Pos.	No.	Driver	Constructor	Q1	Q2	Q3	Final grid
1	44	(United Kingdom) Lewis Hamilton	Mercedes	1:35.851	1:35.634	1:34.779	1
2	77	(Finland) Valtteri Bottas	Mercedes	1:36.200	1:35.674	1:34.973	20^{1}
3	33	(Netherlands) Max Verstappen	Red Bull Racing-Honda	1:36.390	1:36.275	1:35.139	2
4	16	(Monaco) Charles Leclerc	Ferrari	1:36.478	1:35.543	1:35.219	3
5	5	(Germany) Sebastian Vettel	Ferrari	1:36.963	1:35.786	1:35.339	4
6	23	(Thailand) Alexander Albon	Red Bull Racing-Honda	1:36.102	1:36.718	1:35.682	5
7	4	(United Kingdom) Lando Norris	McLaren-Renault	1:37.545	1:36.764	1:36.436	6
8	3	(Australia) Daniel Ricciardo	Renault	1:37.106	1:36.785	1:36.456	7
9	55	(Spain) Carlos Sainz Jr.	McLaren-Renault	1:37.358	1:36.308	1:36.459	8
10	27	(Germany) Nico Hülkenberg	Renault	1:37.506	1:36.859	1:36.710	9
11	11	(Mexico) Sergio Pérez	Racing Point-BWT Mercedes	1:36.961	1:37.055	N/A	10
12	10	(France) Pierre Gasly	Scuderia Toro Rosso-Honda	1:37.198	1:37.089	N/A	11
13	18	(Canada) Lance Stroll	Racing Point-BWT Mercedes	1:37.528	1:37.103	N/A	12
14	26	(Russia) Daniil Kvyat	Scuderia Toro Rosso-Honda	1:37.683	1:37.141	N/A	13
15	20	(Denmark) Kevin Magnussen	Haas-Ferrari	1:37.710	1:37.254	N/A	14
16	8	(France) Romain Grosjean	Haas-Ferrari	1:38.051	N/A	N/A	15
17	99	(Italy) Antonio Giovinazzi	Alfa Romeo Racing-Ferrari	1:38.114	N/A	N/A	16
18	7	(Finland) Kimi Räikkönen	Alfa Romeo Racing-Ferrari	1:38.383	N/A	N/A	17
19	63	(United Kingdom) George Russell	Williams-Mercedes	1:38.717	N/A	N/A	18
20	88	(Poland) Robert Kubica	Williams-Mercedes	1:39.236	N/A	N/A	19
107% time: 1:42.561

Notes

- ^1 – Valtteri Bottas was required to start from the back of the grid for exceeding his quota for power unit components.

== Race ==
Prior to the race, it was announced that the fuel mass in Charles Leclerc's car as declared by Ferrari was "significantly different" to the amount measured by the FIA. It was decided that this would be investigated by the stewards after the race.

The front-runners all maintained their positions into the first corner, with Lewis Hamilton leading from pole position. Further back down the grid, Lance Stroll collided with the rear of Pierre Gasly, causing Gasly to make contact with Sergio Pérez in front of him and resulting in Gasly losing his front wing. Gasly was forced to pit for a replacement which caused him to drop to the back of the grid, over a minute behind 19th place. The incident was not investigated by the stewards. Max Verstappen lost 2nd place to Leclerc on the straight between turns 7 and 8, meanwhile Valtteri Bottas had made up five places on the first lap after starting in last place.

On lap 4 it was announced that DRS was disabled for all cars due to a technical issue after a server crash caused communications with the cars to be disrupted, meaning that it could not be ensured that cars only used DRS in the permitted zones of the track. Shortly after, Stroll complained of difficulties caused by damage from his first lap collision with Gasly. Stroll would later go on to retire from a brake problem after running near the back for most of the race. Lando Norris was the first driver to make a scheduled pit stop on lap 8. Ferrari brought both drivers in for pit stops on lap 12, with Sebastian Vettel suffering with a slow stop causing him to be stationary for nearly 7 seconds.

DRS was eventually enabled on lap 18. Bottas passed Nico Hülkenberg on the same lap to clear the midfield after starting from the back. Robert Kubica and Antonio Giovinazzi both suffered floor damage after colliding during an overtake attempt by Giovinazzi. Verstappen pitted from 2nd on lap 25, followed by Hamilton a lap later who maintained the lead upon exiting the pits. Bottas was the last of the front-runners to pit on lap 29. No positions were gained or lost amongst the top six after the round of pit stops. On lap 32, Verstappen retook 2nd place from Leclerc going into turn 8, having lost the position on the first lap. The Ferrari drivers made a second round of pit stops on lap 38, with Leclerc maintaining 3rd and Vettel dropping from 4th to 6th. Bottas passed Alexander Albon for 4th place soon afterwards.

On lap 41, Carlos Sainz Jr. made a second pit stop from 9th place after he was concerned that his ageing tyres would cause him to be overtaken towards the end of the race, losing a points-scoring position and handing 6th place in the World Drivers' Championship to Gasly. Sainz exited the pits in 14th place. The final two laps saw multiple overtakes; Vettel passed Albon for 5th place, Lando Norris lost 7th place to Pérez, and Sainz successfully passed Hülkenberg to take 10th place and claim a point, securing 6th place in the championship. Hamilton crossed the line to win the race, taking his 11th victory of the season and the 84th of his career. Having also led every lap, taken pole position and recorded the fastest lap of the race, this marked Hamilton's sixth "grand slam", his last of which came at the 2017 British Grand Prix. Hamilton also completed and scored points in every race of 2019, making him the first driver to finish and score points in every race of a season twice (2017 and 2019).

Post-race, Ferrari were handed a €50,000 fine for the pre-race fuel infringement, although Leclerc was allowed to keep his 3rd-place finish. In an interview, Gasly said he was "disgusted" by the collision with Stroll at the start of the race, as his car "clearly had the potential to keep sixth place [in the drivers' championship]". Gasly ended the season in 7th place with 95 points, one short of Sainz's 96.

=== Race classification ===
Pos.	No.	Driver	Constructor	Laps	Time/Retired	Grid	Points
1	44	(United Kingdom) Lewis Hamilton	Mercedes	55	1:34:05.715	1	26^{1}
2	33	(Netherlands) Max Verstappen	Red Bull Racing-Honda	55	+16.772	2	18
3	16	(Monaco) Charles Leclerc	Ferrari	55	+43.435	3	15
4	77	(Finland) Valtteri Bottas	Mercedes	55	+44.379	20	12
5	5	(Germany) Sebastian Vettel	Ferrari	55	+1:04.357	4	10
6	23	(Thailand) Alexander Albon	Red Bull Racing-Honda	55	+1:09.205	5	8
7	11	(Mexico) Sergio Pérez	Racing Point-BWT Mercedes	54	+1 lap	10	6
8	4	(United Kingdom) Lando Norris	McLaren-Renault	54	+1 lap	6	4
9	26	(Russia) Daniil Kvyat	Scuderia Toro Rosso-Honda	54	+1 lap	13	2
10	55	(Spain) Carlos Sainz Jr.	McLaren-Renault	54	+1 lap	8	1
11	3	(Australia) Daniel Ricciardo	Renault	54	+1 lap	7	
12	27	(Germany) Nico Hülkenberg	Renault	54	+1 lap	9	
13	7	(Finland) Kimi Räikkönen	Alfa Romeo Racing-Ferrari	54	+1 lap	17	
14	20	(Denmark) Kevin Magnussen	Haas-Ferrari	54	+1 lap	14	
15	8	(France) Romain Grosjean	Haas-Ferrari	54	+1 lap	15	
16	99	(Italy) Antonio Giovinazzi	Alfa Romeo Racing-Ferrari	54	+1 lap	16	
17	63	(United Kingdom) George Russell	Williams-Mercedes	54	+1 lap	18	
18	10	(France) Pierre Gasly	Scuderia Toro Rosso-Honda	53	+2 laps	11	
19	88	(Poland) Robert Kubica	Williams-Mercedes	53	+2 laps	19	
Ret	18	(Canada) Lance Stroll	Racing Point-BWT Mercedes	45	Brakes	12	
Fastest lap: (United Kingdom) Lewis Hamilton (Mercedes) – 1:39.283 (lap 53)

Notes

- ^1 – Includes one point for fastest lap.

== Final championship standings ==
Drivers' Championship standings

Pos.	Driver	Points
1	(United Kingdom) **Lewis Hamilton**	413
2	(Finland) Valtteri Bottas	326
3	(Netherlands) Max Verstappen	278
4	(Monaco) Charles Leclerc	264
5	(Germany) Sebastian Vettel	240

Constructors' Championship standings

Pos.	Constructor	Points
1	(Germany) **Mercedes**	739
2	(Italy) Ferrari	504
3	(Austria) Red Bull Racing-Honda	417
4	(United Kingdom) McLaren-Renault	145
5	(France) Renault	91

- Note: Only the top five positions are included for both sets of standings.
- **Bold text** indicates the 2019 World Champions.

== See also ==
- 2019 Yas Island Formula 2 round

Previous race: 2019 Brazilian Grand Prix	FIA Formula One World Championship; 2019 season	Next race: 2020 Austrian Grand Prix; Multiple Grands Prix called off including the Australian Grand Prix
Previous race: 2018 Abu Dhabi Grand Prix	Abu Dhabi Grand Prix	Next race: 2020 Abu Dhabi Grand Prix
