= 2018 Abu Dhabi Grand Prix =

Final round of the 2018 F1 season

Race 21 of 21 in the 2018 Formula One World Championship
← Previous race

Race details
- Date: 25 November 2018
- Official name: Formula 1 2018 Etihad Airways Abu Dhabi Grand Prix
- Location: Yas Marina Circuit, Abu Dhabi, United Arab Emirates
- Course: Permanent racing facility
- Course length: 5.554 km (3.451 miles)
- Distance: 55 laps, 305.355 km (189.739 miles)
- Weather: Clear

Pole position
Driver	(United Kingdom) Lewis Hamilton	Mercedes
- Time: 1:34.794

Fastest lap
Driver	(Germany) Sebastian Vettel	Ferrari
- Time: 1:40.867 on lap 54

Podium
First	(United Kingdom) Lewis Hamilton	Mercedes
Second	(Germany) Sebastian Vettel	Ferrari
Third	(Netherlands) Max Verstappen	Red Bull Racing-TAG Heuer

The 2018 Abu Dhabi Grand Prix (officially known as the Formula 1 2018 Etihad Airways Abu Dhabi Grand Prix) was a Formula One motor race held on 25 November 2018 at the Yas Marina Circuit in Abu Dhabi, United Arab Emirates. The race was the twenty first and final round of the 2018 Formula One World Championship and marked the tenth running of the Abu Dhabi Grand Prix and the tenth time that the race has been run as a World Championship event since the inaugural event in 2009. The race was the last to be officiated by Charlie Whiting as race director as he would die shortly before the next race was held.

== Background ==
It was also notable for being the final Grand Prix for Fernando Alonso until his return in 2021. It was also Kimi Räikkönen's last race in his second stint with Ferrari, ahead of his move to Alfa Romeo–Sauber for 2019. McLaren used a special one-off livery to celebrate the last race of Fernando Alonso, who had announced he would not be racing in Formula One in 2019 (he eventually returned in 2021).

=== Title standings before the race ===
Prior to the race, Lewis Hamilton had already secured the 2018 World Drivers' Championship title, while his team, Mercedes, had secured the 2018 World Constructors' Championship title. Lewis Hamilton claimed his fifth World Drivers' title at the 2018 Mexican Grand Prix; following the Brazilian Grand Prix he led Sebastian Vettel by 81 points with Kimi Räikkönen being third, a further 51 points behind. In the World Constructors' Championship, Mercedes led Ferrari by 67 points with only one race remaining in the season, with Red Bull Racing being third in the standings.

== Practice ==
Max Verstappen was fastest in first practice, Valtteri Bottas was fastest in second practice and Lewis Hamilton was fastest in third practice.

== Qualifying ==
Lewis Hamilton set the fastest time in qualifying followed by Mercedes teammate Valtteri Bottas and the Ferrari of Sebastian Vettel.

=== Qualifying classification ===
Pos.	No.	Driver	Constructor	Qualifying times			Final grid
Pos.	No.	Driver	Constructor	Q1	Q2	Q3	Final grid
1	44	(United Kingdom) Lewis Hamilton	Mercedes	1:36.828	1:35.693	1:34.794	1
2	77	(Finland) Valtteri Bottas	Mercedes	1:36.789	1:36.392	1:34.956	2
3	5	(Germany) Sebastian Vettel	Ferrari	1:36.775	1:36.345	1:35.125	3
4	7	(Finland) Kimi Räikkönen	Ferrari	1:37.010	1:36.735	1:35.365	4
5	3	(Australia) Daniel Ricciardo	Red Bull Racing-TAG Heuer	1:37.117	1:36.964	1:35.401	5
6	33	(Netherlands) Max Verstappen	Red Bull Racing-TAG Heuer	1:37.195	1:36.144	1:35.589	6
7	8	(France) Romain Grosjean	Haas-Ferrari	1:37.575	1:36.732	1:36.192	7
8	16	(Monaco) Charles Leclerc	Sauber-Ferrari	1:37.124	1:36.580	1:36.237	8
9	31	(France) Esteban Ocon	Racing Point Force India-Mercedes	1:36.936	1:36.814	1:36.540	9
10	27	(Germany) Nico Hülkenberg	Renault	1:37.569	1:36.630	1:36.542	10
11	55	(Spain) Carlos Sainz Jr.	Renault	1:37.757	1:36.982	N/A	11
12	9	(Sweden) Marcus Ericsson	Sauber-Ferrari	1:37.619	1:37.132	N/A	12
13	20	(Denmark) Kevin Magnussen	Haas-Ferrari	1:37.934	1:37.309	N/A	13
14	11	(Mexico) Sergio Pérez	Racing Point Force India-Mercedes	1:37.255	1:37.541	N/A	14
15	14	(Spain) Fernando Alonso	McLaren-Renault	1:37.890	1:37.743	N/A	15
16	28	(New Zealand) Brendon Hartley	Scuderia Toro Rosso-Honda	1:37.994	N/A	N/A	16
17	10	(France) Pierre Gasly	Scuderia Toro Rosso-Honda	1:38.166	N/A	N/A	17
18	2	(Belgium) Stoffel Vandoorne	McLaren-Renault	1:38.577	N/A	N/A	18
19	35	(Russia) Sergey Sirotkin	Williams-Mercedes	1:38.635	N/A	N/A	19
20	18	(Canada) Lance Stroll	Williams-Mercedes	1:38.682	N/A	N/A	20
107% time: 1:43.549

== Race ==
Hamilton won the race from pole position with Vettel and Max Verstappen completing the podium. On the first lap, Nico Hülkenberg overtook Romain Grosjean at turn 8 at the end of the back straight. Grosjean was pushed off the track by the move but tried to still make turn 9 alongside Hülkenberg. Not realizing that Grosjean was still on his inside, Hülkenberg attempted to take the normal line through turn 9 and his rear right tire ran over Grosjean's front left. This caused the Renault R.S.18 to flip upside on the outside of turn nine. This resulted in the safety car being deployed; the first safety car deployment at the circuit since 2012.

=== Post race ===
After the race had been completed Alonso celebrated the end of his career by performing doughnuts on the pit straight alongside Lewis Hamilton and Sebastian Vettel, the other two World Champions who completed the race (Kimi Räikkönen had retired from the race). Alonso returned to F1 with Alpine to compete in 2021 season.

=== Race classification ===
Pos.	No.	Driver	Constructor	Laps	Time/Retired	Grid	Points
1	44	(United Kingdom) Lewis Hamilton	Mercedes	55	1:39:40.382	1	25
2	5	(Germany) Sebastian Vettel	Ferrari	55	+2.581	3	18
3	33	(Netherlands) Max Verstappen	Red Bull Racing-TAG Heuer	55	+12.706	6	15
4	3	(Australia) Daniel Ricciardo	Red Bull Racing-TAG Heuer	55	+15.379	5	12
5	77	(Finland) Valtteri Bottas	Mercedes	55	+47.957	2	10
6	55	(Spain) Carlos Sainz Jr.	Renault	55	+1:12.548	11	8
7	16	(Monaco) Charles Leclerc	Sauber-Ferrari	55	+1:30.789	8	6
8	11	(Mexico) Sergio Pérez	Racing Point Force India-Mercedes	55	+1:31.275	14	4
9	8	(France) Romain Grosjean	Haas-Ferrari	54	+1 lap	7	2
10	20	(Denmark) Kevin Magnussen	Haas-Ferrari	54	+1 lap	13	1
11	14	(Spain) Fernando Alonso	McLaren-Renault	54	+1 lap^{1}	15	
12	28	(New Zealand) Brendon Hartley	Scuderia Toro Rosso-Honda	54	+1 lap	16	
13	18	(Canada) Lance Stroll	Williams-Mercedes	54	+1 lap	20	
14	2	(Belgium) Stoffel Vandoorne	McLaren-Renault	54	+1 lap	18	
15	35	(Russia) Sergey Sirotkin	Williams-Mercedes	54	+1 lap	19	
Ret	10	(France) Pierre Gasly	Scuderia Toro Rosso-Honda	46	Engine	17	
Ret	31	(France) Esteban Ocon	Racing Point Force India-Mercedes	44	Engine^{1}	9	
Ret	9	(Sweden) Marcus Ericsson	Sauber-Ferrari	24	Power loss	12	
Ret	7	(Finland) Kimi Räikkönen	Ferrari	6	Power loss	4	
Ret	27	(Germany) Nico Hülkenberg	Renault	0	Collision	10	

Notes

- ^1 – Fernando Alonso received three five-second penalties for leaving the track and gaining an advantage. Esteban Ocon received one five-second penalty for the same offence.

== Final Championship standings ==
Drivers' Championship standings

	Pos.	Driver	Points
	1	(United Kingdom) Lewis Hamilton*	408
	2	(Germany) Sebastian Vettel	320
	3	(Finland) Kimi Räikkönen	251
1	4	(Netherlands) Max Verstappen	249
1	5	(Finland) Valtteri Bottas	247

Constructors' Championship standings

Pos.	Constructor	Points
1	(Germany) Mercedes*	655
2	(Italy) Ferrari	571
3	(Austria) Red Bull Racing-TAG Heuer	419
4	(France) Renault	122
5	(United States) Haas-Ferrari	93

- Note: Only the top five positions are included for both sets of standings.
- Bold text and an asterisk indicates the 2018 World Champions.

== See also ==
- 2018 Yas Island Formula 2 round
- 2018 Yas Marina GP3 Series round

Previous race: 2018 Brazilian Grand Prix	FIA Formula One World Championship; 2018 season	Next race: 2019 Australian Grand Prix
Previous race: 2017 Abu Dhabi Grand Prix	Abu Dhabi Grand Prix	Next race: 2019 Abu Dhabi Grand Prix
