= 2020 Abu Dhabi Grand Prix =

2020 Formula One race at the Yas Marina Circuit

Race 17 of 17 (Note: The outbreak of the COVID-19 pandemic saw some Grands Prix cancelled or rescheduled. The revised calendar consisted of seventeen races.) in the 2020 Formula One World Championship
← Previous race

Race details
- Date: 13 December 2020
- Official name: Formula 1 Etihad Airways Abu Dhabi Grand Prix 2020
- Location: Yas Marina Circuit, Abu Dhabi, United Arab Emirates
- Course: Permanent racing facility
- Course length: 5.554 km (3.451 miles)
- Distance: 55 laps, 305.355 km (189.738 miles)
- Weather: Clear
- Attendance: 0 (Note: The Grand Prix was held behind closed doors due to the COVID-19 pandemic in the United Arab Emirates.)

Pole position
Driver	(Netherlands) Max Verstappen	Red Bull Racing-Honda
- Time: 1:35.246

Fastest lap
Driver	(Australia) Daniel Ricciardo	Renault
- Time: 1:40.926 on lap 55

Podium
First	(Netherlands) Max Verstappen	Red Bull Racing-Honda
Second	(Finland) Valtteri Bottas	Mercedes
Third	(United Kingdom) Lewis Hamilton	Mercedes

The 2020 Abu Dhabi Grand Prix (officially known as the Formula 1 Etihad Airways Abu Dhabi Grand Prix 2020) was a Formula One motor race held on 13 December 2020 at the Yas Marina Circuit in Abu Dhabi, United Arab Emirates. The race was the seventeenth and final race of the 2020 Formula One World Championship. Red Bull driver Max Verstappen won the race and led every lap from pole position, followed by Mercedes drivers Valtteri Bottas and Lewis Hamilton who completed the podium.

Red Bull Racing got their first victory at Yas Marina in seven years. McLaren secured third place in the Constructors' Championship which saw them score their highest finish in the Constructors' Championship since 2012. This also meant that for the first time since 2015, a team other than Mercedes, Ferrari, and Red Bull finished in the top three in the Constructors' Championship. This race also marked the last time the original configuration of the Yas Marina circuit which had been used since the first Grand Prix at the venue in 2009 was used by Formula One. Grands Prix would be held on a revised layout from 2021 onwards.

== Background ==
=== Impact of the COVID-19 pandemic ===
The opening rounds of the 2020 championship were heavily affected by the COVID-19 pandemic. Several Grands Prix were cancelled or postponed after the aborted opening round in Australia, prompting the FIA to draft a new calendar. The Bahrain Grand Prix was moved to the Abu Dhabi Grand Prix's original date, delaying the race by two weeks. Due to a surge of COVID-19 cases in the country, organisers announced that the Grand Prix would take place behind closed doors.

=== Entrants ===
The drivers and teams were the same as the pre-season entry list with the only exception being Romain Grosjean, who was replaced by Pietro Fittipaldi at the Sakhir Grand Prix. It would be Fittipaldi's last Grand Prix, and the last for a Brazilian until Gabriel Bortoleto at the 2025 Australian Grand Prix. Mick Schumacher drove for Haas in the first practice session, in place of Kevin Magnussen, while Robert Kubica drove for Alfa Romeo Racing, in place of Antonio Giovinazzi. Robert Shwartzman, who competed in Formula 2, was also due to appear in the first practice session, driving for Haas. However, he did not appear on the entry list. Lewis Hamilton was confirmed as an entrant shortly before the race, having tested negative for the coronavirus, which had caused him to miss the previous round in Sakhir, where Williams driver George Russell took his place.

This was the last Grand Prix appearance for Fittipaldi and Daniil Kvyat; Fittipaldi returned to his reserve driver duties for Haas the following year, while Kvyat exited AlphaTauri after the season ended. This was also the final race as Racing Point for the Silverstone-based team and as Renault for the Enstone-based team, as they were rebranded as Aston Martin and Alpine, respectively, for 2021. The race also marked the 100th Grand Prix start for Haas and the 400th for Renault.

=== Tyres ===
Sole tyre supplier Pirelli provided the C3, C4, and C5 tyre compounds (the softest selection available) for use in dry conditions. Pirelli tested the 2021 tyre compounds during the second practice session.

=== Penalties ===
Charles Leclerc incurred a three-place grid penalty for the race after causing a collision with Sergio Pérez at the Sakhir Grand Prix. Pérez and Kevin Magnussen were required to start from the back of the grid for exceeding their quotas of power unit elements.

== Practice ==
The first practice session ended with Max Verstappen fastest ahead of Valtteri Bottas and Esteban Ocon. The second practice session was red-flagged for 10 minutes after Kimi Räikkönen's Alfa Romeo Racing C39 caught fire, and ended with Valtteri Bottas fastest ahead of Lewis Hamilton and Max Verstappen. Verstappen set the fastest time in the third free practice session, followed by his teammate Alexander Albon and Renault driver Daniel Ricciardo.

== Qualifying ==
Max Verstappen of Red Bull got pole position for the first time since the 2019 Brazilian Grand Prix and the third of his career overall. This was the only pole position of the season achieved by a car not powered by a Mercedes engine and the first time since 2013 that Mercedes have not taken pole at the Yas Marina Circuit. Valtteri Bottas and Lewis Hamilton qualified 2nd and 3rd for Mercedes with Lando Norris of McLaren in 4th, Alexander Albon in the other Red Bull 5th and Carlos Sainz Jr. 6th. Sebastian Vettel started his last race for Ferrari from 13th place. George Russell qualified 18th fastest on his return to Williams ahead of Pietro Fittipaldi of Haas and teammate Nicholas Latifi.

=== Qualifying classification ===
Pos.	No.	Driver	Constructor	Qualifying times			Final grid
Pos.	No.	Driver	Constructor	Q1	Q2	Q3	Final grid
1	33	(Netherlands) Max Verstappen	Red Bull Racing-Honda	1:35.993	1:35.641	1:35.246	1
2	77	(Finland) Valtteri Bottas	Mercedes	1:35.699	1:35.527	1:35.271	2
3	44	(United Kingdom) Lewis Hamilton	Mercedes	1:35.528	1:35.466	1:35.332	3
4	4	(United Kingdom) Lando Norris	McLaren-Renault	1:36.016	1:35.849	1:35.497	4
5	23	(Thailand) Alexander Albon	Red Bull Racing-Honda	1:36.106	1:35.654	1:35.571	5
6	55	(Spain) Carlos Sainz Jr.	McLaren-Renault	1:36.517	1:36.192	1:35.815	6
7	26	(Russia) Daniil Kvyat	AlphaTauri-Honda	1:36.459	1:36.214	1:35.963	7
8	18	(Canada) Lance Stroll	Racing Point-BWT Mercedes	1:36.502	1:36.143	1:36.046	8
9	16	(Monaco) Charles Leclerc	Ferrari	1:35.881	1:35.932	1:36.065	12^{a}
10	10	(France) Pierre Gasly	AlphaTauri-Honda	1:36.545	1:36.282	1:36.242	9
11	31	(France) Esteban Ocon	Renault	1:36.783	1:36.359	N/A	10
12	3	(Australia) Daniel Ricciardo	Renault	1:36.704	1:36.406	N/A	11
13	5	(Germany) Sebastian Vettel	Ferrari	1:36.655	1:36.631	N/A	13
14	99	(Italy) Antonio Giovinazzi	Alfa Romeo Racing-Ferrari	1:37.075	1:38.248	N/A	14
15	11	(Mexico) Sergio Pérez	Racing Point-BWT Mercedes	1:36.034	No time	N/A	19^{b}
16	7	(Finland) Kimi Räikkönen	Alfa Romeo Racing-Ferrari	1:37.555	N/A	N/A	15
17	20	(Denmark) Kevin Magnussen	Haas-Ferrari	1:37.836	N/A	N/A	20^{b}
18	63	(United Kingdom) George Russell	Williams-Mercedes	1:38.045	N/A	N/A	16
19	51	(Brazil) Pietro Fittipaldi	Haas-Ferrari	1:38.173	N/A	N/A	17
20	6	(Canada) Nicholas Latifi	Williams-Mercedes	1:38.443	N/A	N/A	18
107% time: 1:42.214

Notes

- ^a – Charles Leclerc received a three-place grid penalty for causing a collision at the Sakhir Grand Prix.
- ^b – Sergio Pérez and Kevin Magnussen were required to start from the back of the grid for exceeding their quotas of power unit elements.

== Race ==
=== Race summary ===
Verstappen led every lap of the race from pole. Bottas and Hamilton completed the podium with the top 3 remaining in grid order. Albon managed to overtake Lando Norris for 4th place. Norris finished fifth ahead of his teammate Sainz in 6th, with McLaren finishing third in the Constructors' Championship, helped by the fact that Racing Point's Sergio Pérez retired with a technical problem on lap 9. Renault driver Ricciardo, who achieved the fastest lap, was next in 7th with Gasly in 8th. Ocon passed Stroll for 9th on the final lap. Kimi Räikkönen's Alfa Romeo was the lead Ferrari-powered car, finishing 12th ahead of the Ferraris of Charles Leclerc and Sebastian Vettel. Pietro Fittipaldi was the last of all the finishers in 19th place, two laps down of race winner Verstappen.

This was Daniil Kvyat's last race in Formula One before he was replaced by Yuki Tsunoda in 2021, after his contract with AlphaTauri-Honda was not renewed. Kvyat went to the FIA World Endurance Championship in 2023.

=== Post-race ===
The Race reported that Hamilton was criticised after the race for saying that he was not feeling "100%" since he had COVID-19, although he felt grateful to be alive. Verstappen was pleased with victory but did not necessarily think the team would be title challengers in 2021. Ironically, he ended up winning the Drivers' Championship in 2021. George Russell said he found readapting to the Williams for this event much tougher than adapting to the Mercedes for the Sakhir Grand Prix.

=== Race classification ===
Pos.	No.	Driver	Constructor	Laps	Time/Retired	Grid	Points
1	33	(Netherlands) Max Verstappen	Red Bull Racing-Honda	55	1:36:28.645	1	25
2	77	(Finland) Valtteri Bottas	Mercedes	55	+15.976	2	18
3	44	(United Kingdom) Lewis Hamilton	Mercedes	55	+18.415	3	15
4	23	(Thailand) Alexander Albon	Red Bull Racing-Honda	55	+19.987	5	12
5	4	(United Kingdom) Lando Norris	McLaren-Renault	55	+1:00.729	4	10
6	55	(Spain) Carlos Sainz Jr.	McLaren-Renault	55	+1:05.662	6	8
7	3	(Australia) Daniel Ricciardo	Renault	55	+1:13.748	11	7^{1}
8	10	(France) Pierre Gasly	AlphaTauri-Honda	55	+1:29.718	9	4
9	31	(France) Esteban Ocon	Renault	55	+1:41.069	10	2
10	18	(Canada) Lance Stroll	Racing Point-BWT Mercedes	55	+1:42.738	8	1
11	26	(Russia) Daniil Kvyat	AlphaTauri-Honda	54	+1 lap	7	
12	7	(Finland) Kimi Räikkönen	Alfa Romeo Racing-Ferrari	54	+1 lap	15	
13	16	(Monaco) Charles Leclerc	Ferrari	54	+1 lap	12	
14	5	(Germany) Sebastian Vettel	Ferrari	54	+1 lap	13	
15	63	(United Kingdom) George Russell	Williams-Mercedes	54	+1 lap	16	
16	99	(Italy) Antonio Giovinazzi	Alfa Romeo Racing-Ferrari	54	+1 lap	14	
17	6	(Canada) Nicholas Latifi	Williams-Mercedes	54	+1 lap	18	
18	20	(Denmark) Kevin Magnussen	Haas-Ferrari	54	+1 lap	20	
19	51	(Brazil) Pietro Fittipaldi	Haas-Ferrari	53	+2 laps	17	
Ret	11	(Mexico) Sergio Pérez	Racing Point-BWT Mercedes	8	Power unit	19	
Fastest lap: (Australia) Daniel Ricciardo (Renault) – 1:40.926 (lap 55)

Notes

- ^1 – Includes one point for fastest lap.

== Final Championship standings ==
Drivers' Championship standings

Pos.	Driver	Points
1	(United Kingdom) **Lewis Hamilton**	347
2	(Finland) Valtteri Bottas	223
3	(Netherlands) Max Verstappen	214
4	(Mexico) Sergio Pérez	125
5	(Australia) Daniel Ricciardo	119

Constructors' Championship standings

	Pos.	Constructor	Points
	1	(Germany) **Mercedes**	573
	2	(Austria) Red Bull Racing-Honda	319
1	3	(United Kingdom) McLaren-Renault	202
1	4	(United Kingdom) Racing Point-BWT Mercedes	195 (Note: Racing Point was deducted 15 points after a protest from Renault was upheld regarding the legality of their car.)
	5	(France) Renault	181

- Note: Only the top five positions are included for both sets of standings.
- **Bold text** indicates the 2020 World Champions.

== Notes ==
Previous race: 2020 Sakhir Grand Prix	FIA Formula One World Championship; 2020 season	Next race: 2021 Bahrain Grand Prix
Previous race: 2019 Abu Dhabi Grand Prix	Abu Dhabi Grand Prix	Next race: 2021 Abu Dhabi Grand Prix
