= List of Formula One Grand Prix winners =

Formula One (F1) is the highest class of open-wheeled motor racing defined by the Fédération Internationale de l'Automobile (FIA), motorsport's world governing body. The F1 World Championship season consists of a series of races, known as Grands Prix, held usually on purpose-built circuits, and in a few cases on closed city streets. Each winner is presented with a trophy and the results of each race are combined to determine two annual Championships, one for drivers and one for constructors. The World Championship for Drivers has been contended since 1950, after the Formula One standard was agreed upon in 1946. The Constructors' Championship was added for the 1958 season and has been awarded ever since.

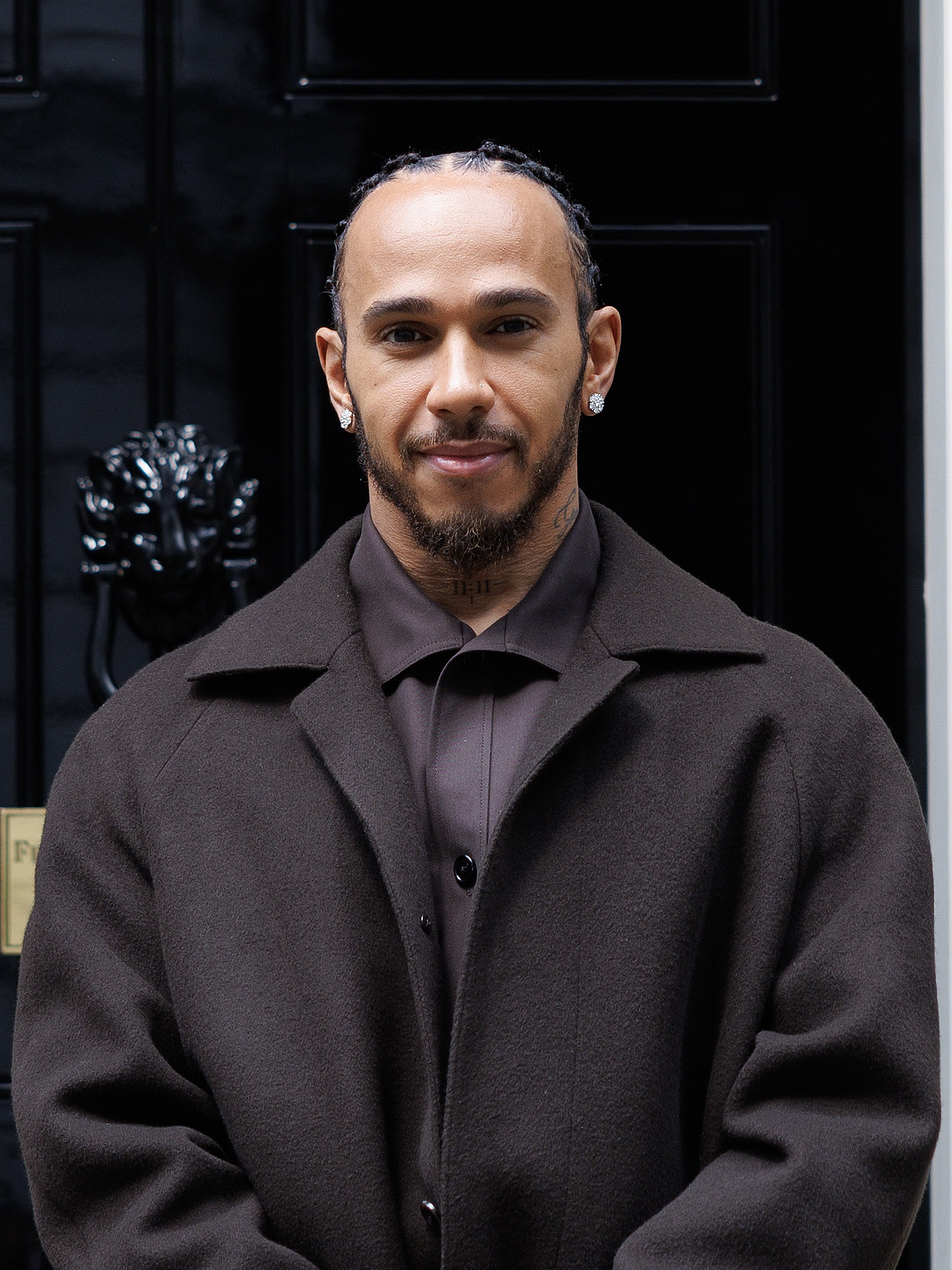
Lewis Hamilton has won a record 106 Grands Prix during his career: 21 with McLaren, 84 with Mercedes, and 1 with Ferrari.

Lewis Hamilton holds the record for the most race wins in Formula One history, with 106 wins to date. Michael Schumacher, the previous record holder, is second with 91 wins, and Max Verstappen is third with 75 victories. Hamilton also holds the distinction of having the longest time between his first win and his last. He won his first Grand Prix at the 2007 Canadian Grand Prix, and his last at the 2026 Barcelona-Catalunya Grand Prix, a span of 19 years and 4 days. Riccardo Patrese holds the record for the longest period of time between two race wins – more than six-and-a-half years between the 1983 South African Grand Prix and the 1990 San Marino Grand Prix. Mario Andretti had to wait the longest time between his maiden victory at the 1971 South African Grand Prix and his second win – coming five years, seven months and 18 days later at the 1976 Japanese Grand Prix. Verstappen holds the record for the most consecutive wins, having won ten Grands Prix in a row from the 2023 Miami Grand Prix to the 2023 Italian Grand Prix. Verstappen is also the youngest winner of a Grand Prix; he was 18 years and 228 days old when he won the 2016 Spanish Grand Prix. Luigi Fagioli is the oldest winner of a Formula One Grand Prix; he was 53 years and 22 days old when he won the 1951 French Grand Prix.

As of the 2026 Las Vegas Grand Prix, out of the 784 drivers who started a Grand Prix, there have been 116 Formula One Grand Prix winners. The first Grand Prix winner was Giuseppe Farina at the 1950 British Grand Prix, and the most recent driver to score their first Grand Prix win is Kimi Antonelli who took his first win at the 2026 Chinese Grand Prix. Three Grands Prix, the 1951 French, the 1956 Argentine and the 1957 British Grands Prix, were won by two drivers sharing a car, so both drivers in each event were credited with a Grand Prix victory. In addition to event-specific trophies, gold medals have been awarded to all victors from the 2022 Abu Dhabi Grand Prix onwards.

This list includes the winners of the 11 Indianapolis 500 races between 1950 and 1960, as they were part of the World Championships in early years, even though they were not run by Formula One regulations, nor are they referred to as Grands Prix.

== By driver ==
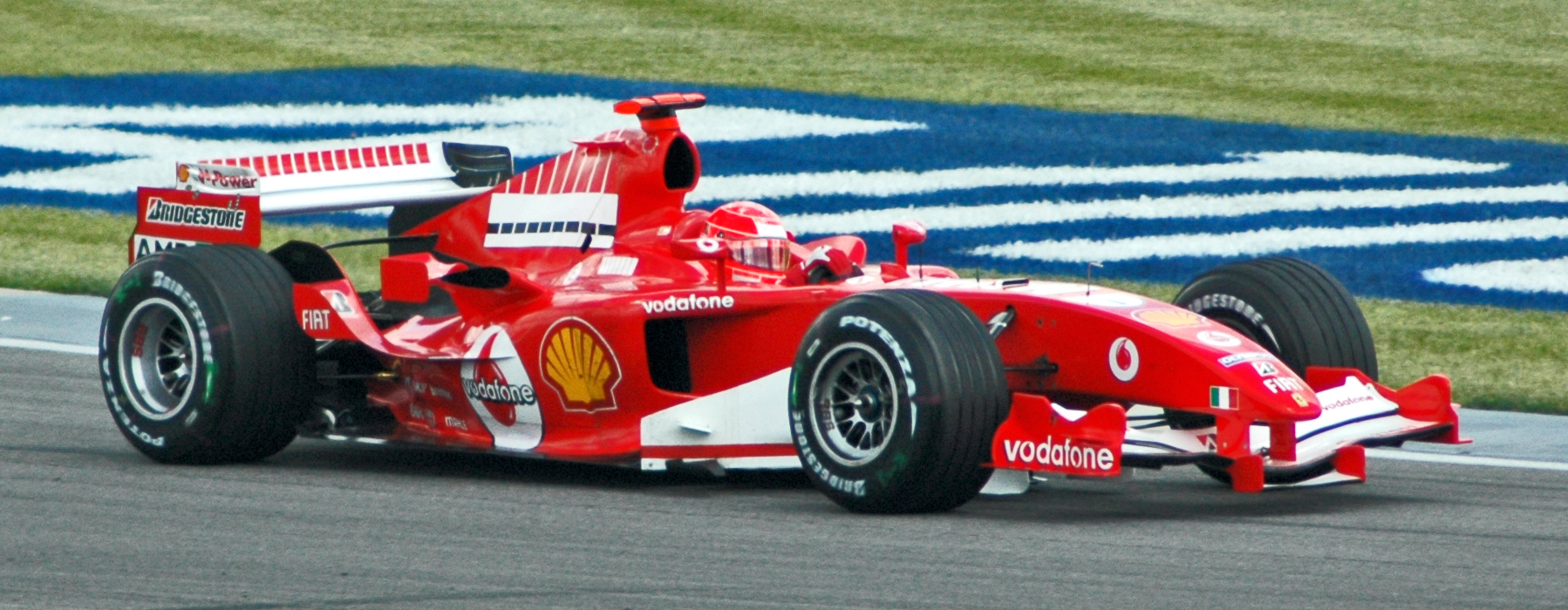
Michael Schumacher held the record until 2020, with 91 victories.

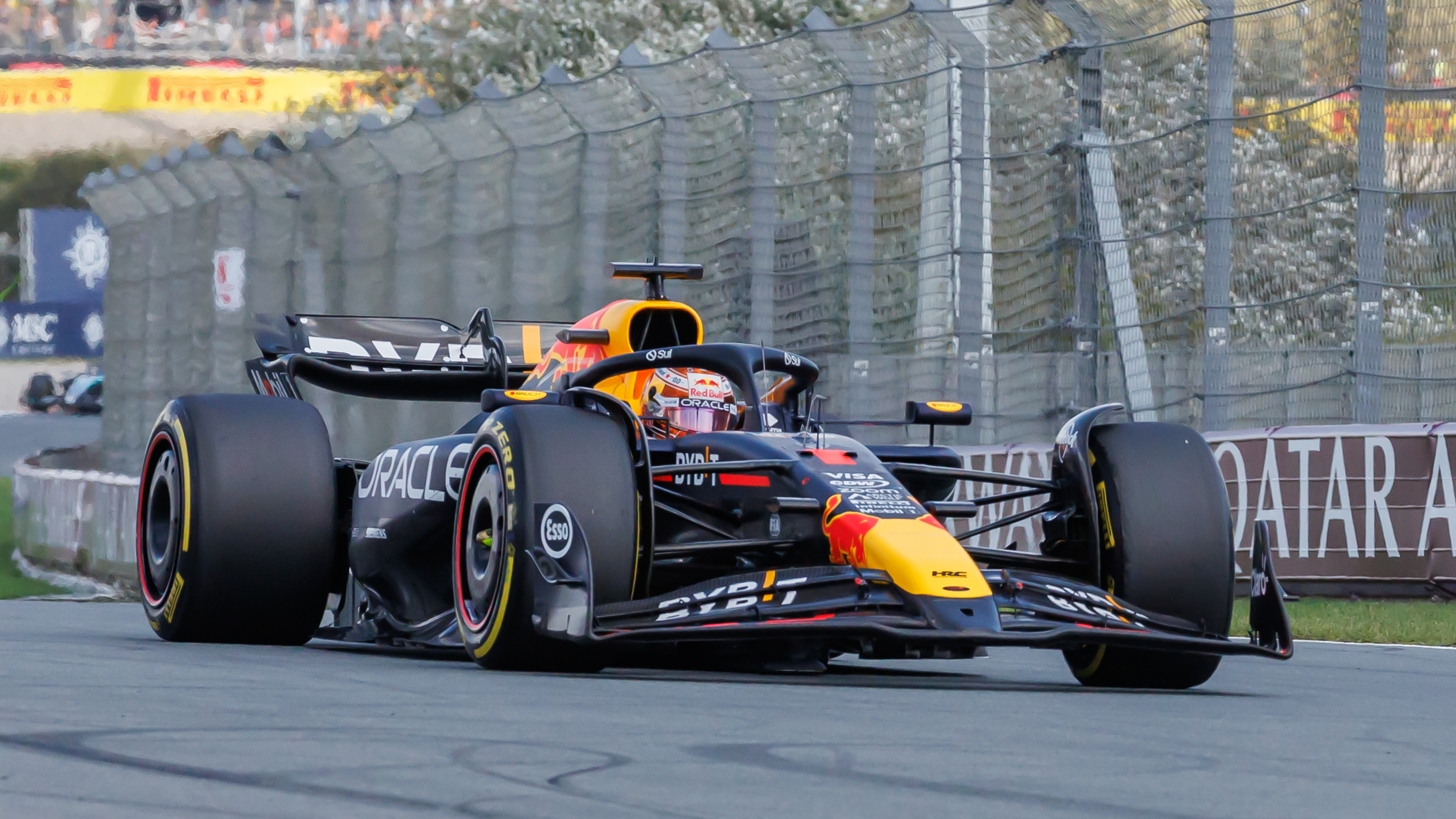
Max Verstappen has won 75 Grands Prix, and is the youngest winner in Formula One history.

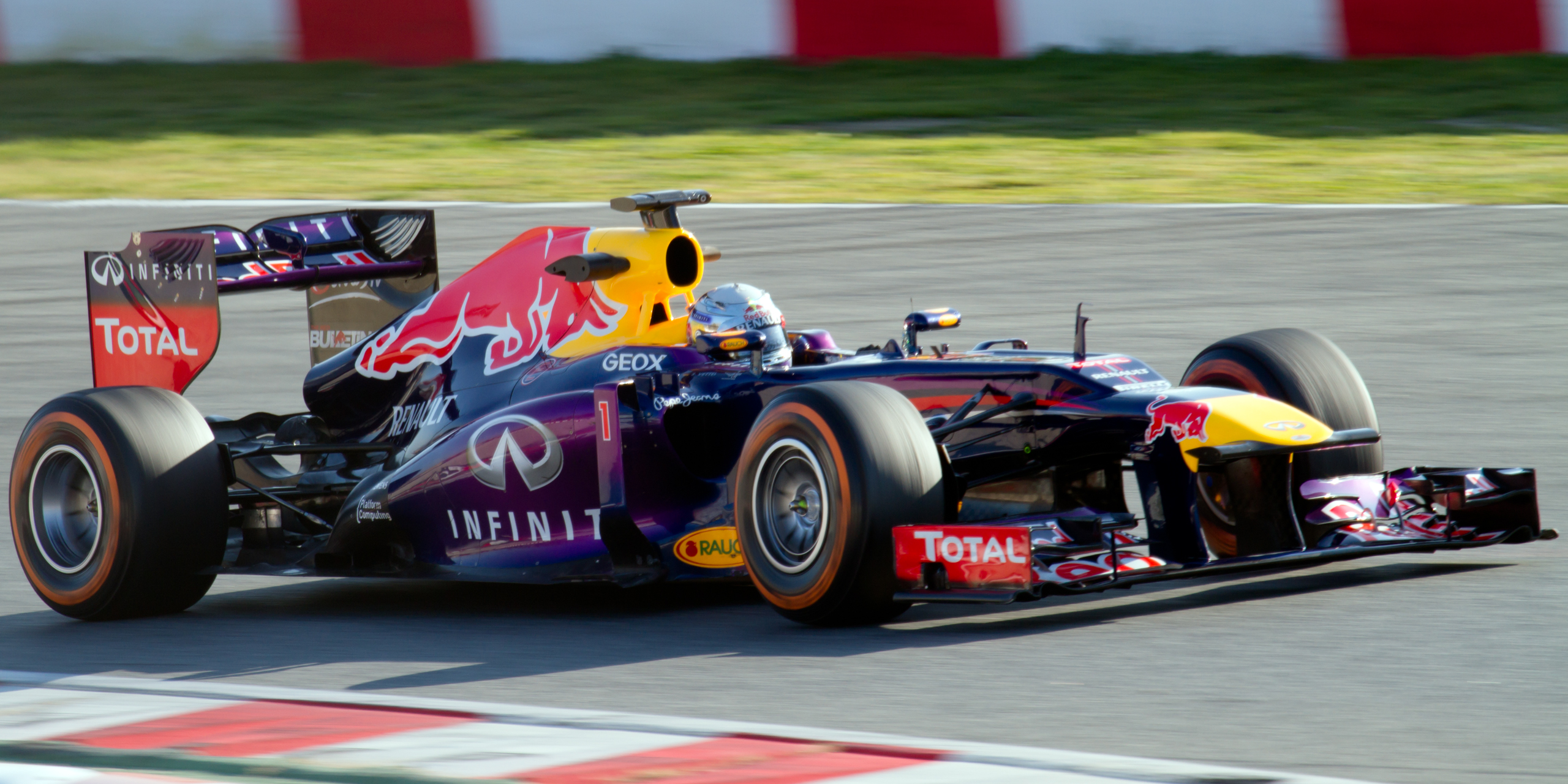
Sebastian Vettel took 53 victories across 16 seasons.

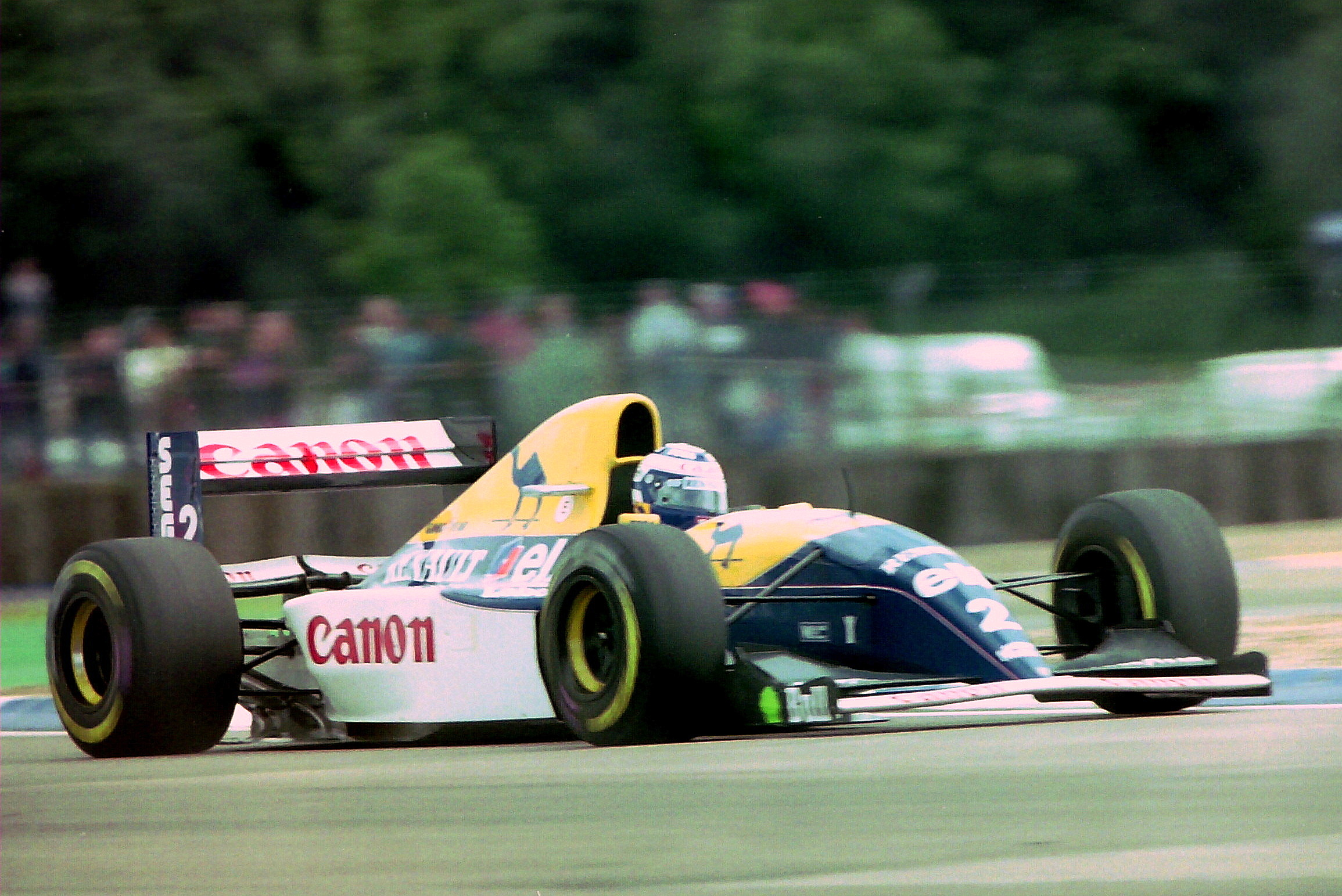
Alain Prost held the record until 2001, with 51 victories.

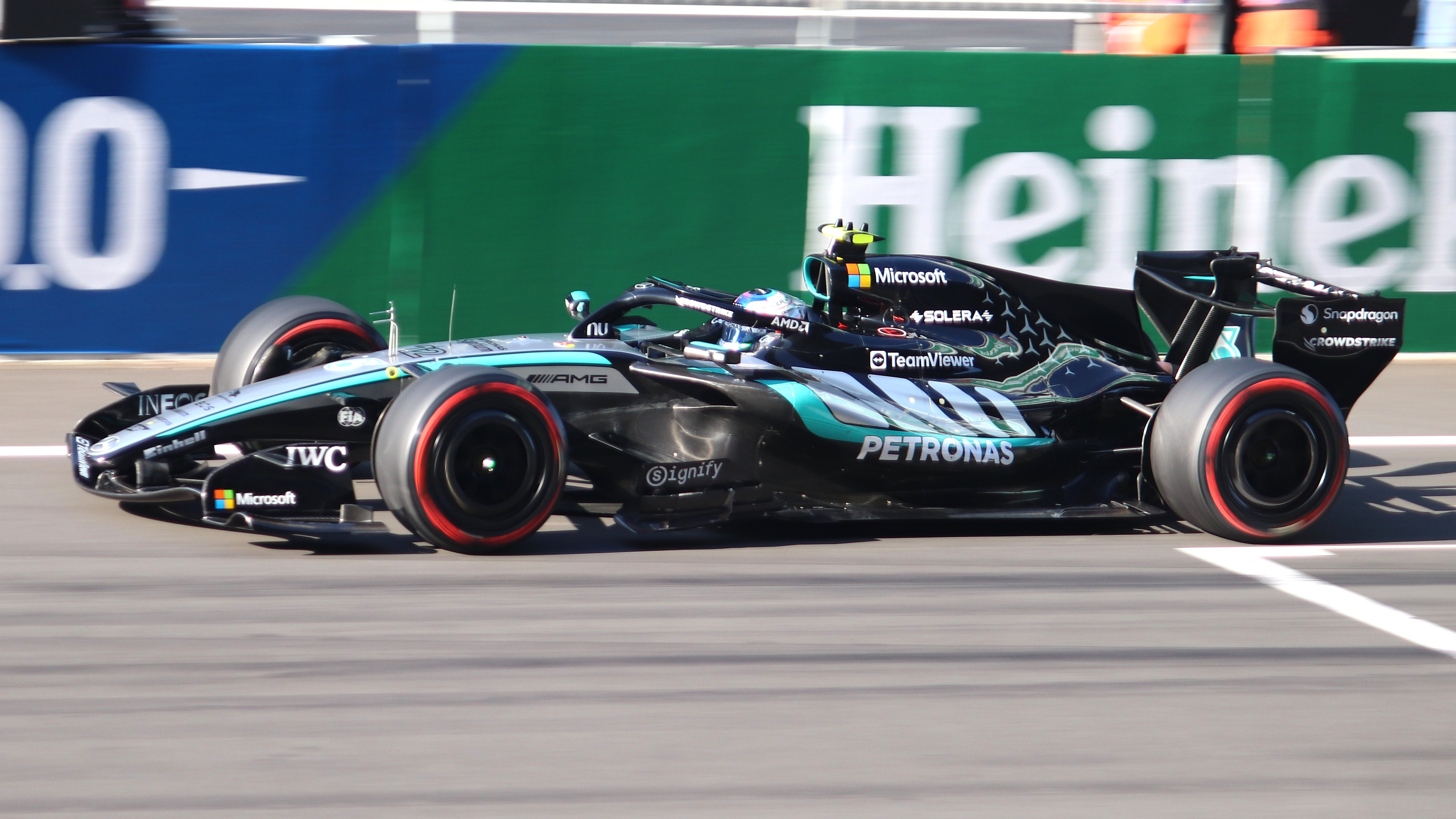
Kimi Antonelli is the 116th and latest first-time Grand Prix winner, taking his maiden victory at the 2026 Chinese Grand Prix.

Key
*	Driver has competed in the 2026 season
‡	Formula One World Champion
†	Has competed in the 2026 season and is a Formula One World Champion

Formula One Grand Prix winners
Rank	Country	Driver	Wins	Seasons active	First win	Last win
1	United Kingdom	Lewis Hamilton†	106	2007–	2007 Canadian Grand Prix	2026 Barcelona-Catalunya Grand Prix
2	Germany	Michael Schumacher‡	91	1991–2006, 2010–2012	1992 Belgian Grand Prix	2006 Chinese Grand Prix
3	Netherlands	Max Verstappen†	75	2015–	2016 Spanish Grand Prix	2026 Las Vegas Grand Prix
4	Germany	Sebastian Vettel‡	53	2007–2022	2008 Italian Grand Prix	2019 Singapore Grand Prix
5	France	Alain Prost‡	51	1980–1991, 1993	1981 French Grand Prix	1993 German Grand Prix
6	Brazil	Ayrton Senna‡	41	1984–1994	1985 Portuguese Grand Prix	1993 Australian Grand Prix
7	Spain	Fernando Alonso†	32	2001, 2003–2018, 2021–	2003 Hungarian Grand Prix	2013 Spanish Grand Prix
8	United Kingdom	Nigel Mansell‡	31	1980–1992, 1994–1995	1985 European Grand Prix	1994 Australian Grand Prix
9	United Kingdom	Jackie Stewart‡	27	1965–1973	1965 Italian Grand Prix	1973 German Grand Prix
10	United Kingdom	Jim Clark‡	25	1960–1968	1962 Belgian Grand Prix	1968 South African Grand Prix
10	Austria	Niki Lauda‡	25	1971–1979, 1982–1985	1974 Spanish Grand Prix	1985 Dutch Grand Prix
12	Argentina	Juan Manuel Fangio‡	24	1950–1951, 1953–1958	1950 Monaco Grand Prix	1957 German Grand Prix
13	Brazil	Nelson Piquet‡	23	1978–1991	1980 United States Grand Prix West	1991 Canadian Grand Prix
13	Germany	Nico Rosberg‡	23	2006–2016	2012 Chinese Grand Prix	2016 Japanese Grand Prix
15	United Kingdom	Damon Hill‡	22	1992–1999	1993 Hungarian Grand Prix	1998 Belgian Grand Prix
16	Finland	Kimi Räikkönen‡	21	2001–2009, 2012–2021	2003 Malaysian Grand Prix	2018 United States Grand Prix
17	Finland	Mika Häkkinen‡	20	1991–2001	1997 European Grand Prix	2001 United States Grand Prix
18	United Kingdom	Stirling Moss	16	1951–1961	1955 British Grand Prix	1961 German Grand Prix
19	United Kingdom	Jenson Button‡	15	2000–2017	2006 Hungarian Grand Prix	2012 Brazilian Grand Prix
20	United Kingdom	Graham Hill‡	14	1958–1975	1962 Dutch Grand Prix	1969 Monaco Grand Prix
20	Australia	Jack Brabham‡	14	1955–1970	1959 Monaco Grand Prix	1970 South African Grand Prix
20	Brazil	Emerson Fittipaldi‡	14	1970–1980	1970 United States Grand Prix	1975 British Grand Prix
20	United Kingdom	Lando Norris†	14	2019–	2024 Miami Grand Prix	2026 São Paulo Grand Prix
24	Italy	Alberto Ascari‡	13	1950–1955	1951 German Grand Prix	1953 Swiss Grand Prix
24	United Kingdom	David Coulthard	13	1994–2008	1995 Portuguese Grand Prix	2003 Australian Grand Prix
26	United States	Mario Andretti‡	12	1968–1972, 1974–1982	1971 South African Grand Prix	1978 Dutch Grand Prix
26	Argentina	Carlos Reutemann	12	1972–1982	1974 South African Grand Prix	1981 Belgian Grand Prix
26	Australia	Alan Jones‡	12	1975–1981, 1983, 1985–1986	1977 Austrian Grand Prix	1981 Caesars Palace Grand Prix
29	Canada	Jacques Villeneuve‡	11	1996–2006	1996 European Grand Prix	1997 Luxembourg Grand Prix
29	Brazil	Felipe Massa	11	2002, 2004–2017	2006 Turkish Grand Prix	2008 Brazilian Grand Prix
29	Brazil	Rubens Barrichello	11	1993–2011	2000 German Grand Prix	2009 Italian Grand Prix
32	United Kingdom	James Hunt‡	10	1973–1979	1975 Dutch Grand Prix	1977 Japanese Grand Prix
32	Sweden	Ronnie Peterson	10	1970–1978	1973 French Grand Prix	1978 Austrian Grand Prix
32	South Africa	Jody Scheckter‡	10	1972–1980	1974 Swedish Grand Prix	1979 Italian Grand Prix
32	Austria	Gerhard Berger	10	1984–1997	1986 Mexican Grand Prix	1997 German Grand Prix
32	Finland	Valtteri Bottas*	10	2013–2024, 2026–	2017 Russian Grand Prix	2021 Turkish Grand Prix
37	Australia	Mark Webber	9	2002–2013	2009 German Grand Prix	2012 British Grand Prix
37	Australia	Oscar Piastri*	9	2023–	2024 Hungarian Grand Prix	2025 Dutch Grand Prix
37	Monaco	Charles Leclerc*	9	2018–	2019 Belgian Grand Prix	2026 British Grand Prix
37	Italy	Kimi Antonelli†	9	2025–	2026 Chinese Grand Prix	2026 United States Grand Prix
41	Belgium	Jacky Ickx	8	1967–1979	1968 French Grand Prix	1972 German Grand Prix
41	New Zealand	Denny Hulme‡	8	1965–1974	1967 Monaco Grand Prix	1974 Argentine Grand Prix
41	Australia	Daniel Ricciardo	8	2011–2024	2014 Canadian Grand Prix	2021 Italian Grand Prix
41	United Kingdom	George Russell*	8	2019–	2022 São Paulo Grand Prix	2026 Azerbaijan Grand Prix
45	France	René Arnoux	7	1978–1989	1980 Brazilian Grand Prix	1983 Dutch Grand Prix
45	Colombia	Juan Pablo Montoya	7	2001–2006	2001 Italian Grand Prix	2005 Brazilian Grand Prix
47	United Kingdom	Tony Brooks	6	1956–1961	1957 British Grand Prix	1959 German Grand Prix
47	United Kingdom	John Surtees‡	6	1960–1972	1963 German Grand Prix	1967 Italian Grand Prix
47	Austria	Jochen Rindt‡	6	1964–1970	1969 United States Grand Prix	1970 German Grand Prix
47	Canada	Gilles Villeneuve	6	1977–1982	1978 Canadian Grand Prix	1981 Spanish Grand Prix
47	France	Jacques Laffite	6	1974–1986	1977 Swedish Grand Prix	1981 Canadian Grand Prix
47	Italy	Riccardo Patrese	6	1977–1993	1982 Monaco Grand Prix	1992 Japanese Grand Prix
47	Germany	Ralf Schumacher	6	1997–2007	2001 San Marino Grand Prix	2003 French Grand Prix
47	Mexico	Sergio Pérez*	6	2011–2024, 2026–	2020 Sakhir Grand Prix	2023 Azerbaijan Grand Prix
55	Italy	Giuseppe Farina‡	5	1950–1955	1950 British Grand Prix	1953 German Grand Prix
55	Switzerland	Clay Regazzoni	5	1970–1980	1970 Italian Grand Prix	1979 British Grand Prix
55	United Kingdom	John Watson	5	1973–1983, 1985	1976 Austrian Grand Prix	1983 United States West Grand Prix
55	Italy	Michele Alboreto	5	1981–1994	1982 Caesars Palace Grand Prix	1985 German Grand Prix
55	Finland	Keke Rosberg‡	5	1978–1986	1982 Swiss Grand Prix	1985 Australian Grand Prix
60	United States	Dan Gurney	4	1959–1968, 1970	1962 French Grand Prix	1967 Belgian Grand Prix
60	New Zealand	Bruce McLaren	4	1958–1970	1959 United States Grand Prix	1968 Belgian Grand Prix
60	United Kingdom	Eddie Irvine	4	1993–2002	1999 Australian Grand Prix	1999 Malaysian Grand Prix
60	Spain	Carlos Sainz Jr.*	4	2015–	2022 British Grand Prix	2024 Mexico City Grand Prix
64	United Kingdom	Mike Hawthorn‡	3	1952–1958	1953 French Grand Prix	1958 French Grand Prix
64	United Kingdom	Peter Collins	3	1952–1958	1956 Belgian Grand Prix	1958 British Grand Prix
64	United States	Phil Hill‡	3	1958–1964, 1966	1960 Italian Grand Prix	1961 Italian Grand Prix
64	France	Didier Pironi	3	1978–1982	1980 Belgian Grand Prix	1982 Dutch Grand Prix
64	Belgium	Thierry Boutsen	3	1983–1993	1989 Canadian Grand Prix	1990 Hungarian Grand Prix
64	Germany	Heinz-Harald Frentzen	3	1994–2003	1997 San Marino Grand Prix	1999 Italian Grand Prix
64	United Kingdom	Johnny Herbert	3	1989–2000	1995 British Grand Prix	1999 European Grand Prix
64	Italy	Giancarlo Fisichella	3	1996–2009	2003 Brazilian Grand Prix	2006 Malaysian Grand Prix
72	United States	Bill Vukovich	2	1951–1955	1953 Indianapolis 500	1954 Indianapolis 500
72	Argentina	José Froilán González	2	1950–1957, 1960	1951 British Grand Prix	1954 British Grand Prix
72	France	Maurice Trintignant	2	1950–1964	1955 Monaco Grand Prix	1958 Monaco Grand Prix
72	Germany	Wolfgang von Trips	2	1956–1961	1961 Dutch Grand Prix	1961 British Grand Prix
72	Mexico	Pedro Rodríguez	2	1963–1971	1967 South African Grand Prix	1970 Belgian Grand Prix
72	Switzerland	Jo Siffert	2	1962–1971	1968 British Grand Prix	1971 Austrian Grand Prix
72	United States	Peter Revson	2	1964, 1971–1974	1973 British Grand Prix	1973 Canadian Grand Prix
72	France	Patrick Depailler	2	1972, 1974–1980	1978 Monaco Grand Prix	1979 Spanish Grand Prix
72	France	Jean-Pierre Jabouille	2	1974–1975, 1977–1981	1979 French Grand Prix	1980 Austrian Grand Prix
72	France	Patrick Tambay	2	1977–1986	1982 German Grand Prix	1983 San Marino Grand Prix
72	Italy	Elio de Angelis	2	1979–1986	1982 Austrian Grand Prix	1985 San Marino Grand Prix
83	United States	Johnnie Parsons	1	1950–1958	1950 Indianapolis 500	1950 Indianapolis 500
83	United States	Lee Wallard	1	1950–1951	1951 Indianapolis 500	1951 Indianapolis 500
83	Italy	Luigi Fagioli	1	1950–1951	1951 French Grand Prix	1951 French Grand Prix
83	Italy	Piero Taruffi	1	1950–1956	1952 Swiss Grand Prix	1952 Swiss Grand Prix
83	United States	Troy Ruttman	1	1950–1952, 1954, 1956–1958, 1960	1952 Indianapolis 500	1952 Indianapolis 500
83	United States	Bob Sweikert	1	1952–1956	1955 Indianapolis 500	1955 Indianapolis 500
83	Italy	Luigi Musso	1	1954–1958	1956 Argentine Grand Prix	1956 Argentine Grand Prix
83	United States	Pat Flaherty	1	1950–1959	1956 Indianapolis 500	1956 Indianapolis 500
83	United States	Sam Hanks	1	1950–1957	1957 Indianapolis 500	1957 Indianapolis 500
83	United States	Jimmy Bryan	1	1952–1960	1958 Indianapolis 500	1958 Indianapolis 500
83	United States	Rodger Ward	1	1951–1960, 1963	1959 Indianapolis 500	1959 Indianapolis 500
83	Sweden	Jo Bonnier	1	1956–1971	1959 Dutch Grand Prix	1959 Dutch Grand Prix
83	United States	Jim Rathmann	1	1950, 1952–1960	1960 Indianapolis 500	1960 Indianapolis 500
83	Italy	Giancarlo Baghetti	1	1961–1967	1961 French Grand Prix	1961 French Grand Prix
83	United Kingdom	Innes Ireland	1	1959–1966	1961 United States Grand Prix	1961 United States Grand Prix
83	Italy	Lorenzo Bandini	1	1961–1967	1964 Austrian Grand Prix	1964 Austrian Grand Prix
83	United States	Richie Ginther	1	1960–1967	1965 Mexican Grand Prix	1965 Mexican Grand Prix
83	Italy	Ludovico Scarfiotti	1	1963–1968	1966 Italian Grand Prix	1966 Italian Grand Prix
83	United Kingdom	Peter Gethin	1	1970–1974	1971 Italian Grand Prix	1971 Italian Grand Prix
83	France	François Cevert	1	1970–1973	1971 United States Grand Prix	1971 United States Grand Prix
83	France	Jean-Pierre Beltoise	1	1967–1974	1972 Monaco Grand Prix	1972 Monaco Grand Prix
83	Brazil	José Carlos Pace	1	1972–1977	1975 Brazilian Grand Prix	1975 Brazilian Grand Prix
83	Germany	Jochen Mass	1	1973–1982	1975 Spanish Grand Prix	1975 Spanish Grand Prix
83	Italy	Vittorio Brambilla	1	1974–1980	1975 Austrian Grand Prix	1975 Austrian Grand Prix
83	Sweden	Gunnar Nilsson	1	1976–1977	1977 Belgian Grand Prix	1977 Belgian Grand Prix
83	Italy	Alessandro Nannini	1	1986–1990	1989 Japanese Grand Prix	1989 Japanese Grand Prix
83	France	Jean Alesi	1	1989–2001	1995 Canadian Grand Prix	1995 Canadian Grand Prix
83	France	Olivier Panis	1	1994–1999, 2001–2004	1996 Monaco Grand Prix	1996 Monaco Grand Prix
83	Italy	Jarno Trulli	1	1997–2011	2004 Monaco Grand Prix	2004 Monaco Grand Prix
83	Poland	Robert Kubica	1	2006–2010, 2019, 2021	2008 Canadian Grand Prix	2008 Canadian Grand Prix
83	Finland	Heikki Kovalainen	1	2007–2013	2008 Hungarian Grand Prix	2008 Hungarian Grand Prix
83	Venezuela	Pastor Maldonado	1	2011–2015	2012 Spanish Grand Prix	2012 Spanish Grand Prix
83	France	Pierre Gasly*	1	2017–	2020 Italian Grand Prix	2020 Italian Grand Prix
83	France	Esteban Ocon*	1	2016–2018, 2020–	2021 Hungarian Grand Prix	2021 Hungarian Grand Prix

== By nationality ==
Key
**Bold**	Driver has competed in the 2026 season

List of races won, by nationality of driver
Rank	Country	Wins	Driver(s)	No. of drivers
1	United Kingdom	332	**Lewis Hamilton (106)**, Nigel Mansell (31), Jackie Stewart (27), Jim Clark (25), Damon Hill (22), Stirling Moss (16), Jenson Button (15), Graham Hill (14), **Lando Norris (14)**, David Coulthard (13), James Hunt (10), **George Russell (8)**, Tony Brooks (6), John Surtees (6), John Watson (5), Eddie Irvine (4), Mike Hawthorn (3), Peter Collins (3), Johnny Herbert (3), Innes Ireland (1), Peter Gethin (1)	21
2	Germany	179	Michael Schumacher (91), Sebastian Vettel (53), Nico Rosberg (23), Ralf Schumacher (6), Heinz-Harald Frentzen (3), Wolfgang von Trips (2), Jochen Mass (1)	7
3	Brazil	101	Ayrton Senna (41), Nelson Piquet (23), Emerson Fittipaldi (14), Rubens Barrichello (11), Felipe Massa (11), Carlos Pace (1)	6
4	France	81	Alain Prost (51), René Arnoux (7), Jacques Laffite (6), Didier Pironi (3), Maurice Trintignant (2), Patrick Depailler (2), Jean-Pierre Jabouille (2), Patrick Tambay (2), François Cevert (1), Jean-Pierre Beltoise (1), Jean Alesi (1), Olivier Panis (1), **Pierre Gasly (1)**, **Esteban Ocon (1)**	14
5	Netherlands	75	**Max Verstappen (75)**	1
6	Finland	57	Kimi Räikkönen (21), Mika Häkkinen (20), **Valtteri Bottas (10)**, Keke Rosberg (5), Heikki Kovalainen (1)	5
7	Australia	52	Jack Brabham (14), Alan Jones (12), **Oscar Piastri (9)**, Mark Webber (9), Daniel Ricciardo (8)	5
7	Italy	52	Alberto Ascari (13), **Kimi Antonelli (9)**, Riccardo Patrese (6), Giuseppe Farina (5), Michele Alboreto (5), Giancarlo Fisichella (3), Elio de Angelis (2), Luigi Fagioli (1), Piero Taruffi (1), Luigi Musso (1), Giancarlo Baghetti (1), Lorenzo Bandini (1), Ludovico Scarfiotti (1), Vittorio Brambilla (1), Alessandro Nannini (1), Jarno Trulli (1)	16
9	Austria	41	Niki Lauda (25), Gerhard Berger (10), Jochen Rindt (6)	3
10	Argentina	38	Juan Manuel Fangio (24), Carlos Reutemann (12), José Froilán González (2)	3
11	Spain	36	**Fernando Alonso (32)**, **Carlos Sainz Jr. (4)**	2
12	United States	33	Mario Andretti (12), Dan Gurney (4), Phil Hill (3), Bill Vukovich (2), Peter Revson (2), Johnnie Parsons (1), Lee Wallard (1), Troy Ruttman (1), Bob Sweikert (1), Pat Flaherty (1), Sam Hanks (1), Jimmy Bryan (1), Rodger Ward (1), Jim Rathmann (1), Richie Ginther (1)	15
13	Canada	17	Jacques Villeneuve (11), Gilles Villeneuve (6)	2
14	New Zealand	12	Denny Hulme (8), Bruce McLaren (4)	2
14	Sweden	12	Ronnie Peterson (10), Jo Bonnier (1), Gunnar Nilsson (1)	3
16	Belgium	11	Jacky Ickx (8), Thierry Boutsen (3)	2
17	South Africa	10	Jody Scheckter (10)	1
18	Monaco	9	**Charles Leclerc (9)**	1
19	Mexico	8	**Sergio Pérez (6)**, Pedro Rodríguez (2)	2
20	Switzerland	7	Clay Regazzoni (5), Jo Siffert (2)	2
20	Colombia	7	Juan Pablo Montoya (7)	1
22	Poland	1	Robert Kubica (1)	1
22	Venezuela	1	Pastor Maldonado (1)	1

== Most wins per season ==
Key
	Driver has competed in the 2026 season
**Bold**	Won the World Championship in the same year

Highest number of Grand Prix wins per season
Year	Driver(s)	Constructor(s)	Wins	Races	Percentage
1950	(Argentina) Juan Manuel Fangio	Alfa Romeo	3	7	42.86%
1950	(Italy) **Giuseppe Farina**	Alfa Romeo	3	7	42.86%
1951	(Argentina) **Juan Manuel Fangio**	Alfa Romeo	3	8	37.50%
1952	(Italy) **Alberto Ascari**	Ferrari	6	8	75.00%
1953	(Italy) **Alberto Ascari**	Ferrari	5	9	55.56%
1954	(Argentina) **Juan Manuel Fangio**	Maserati, Mercedes	6	9	66.67%
1955	(Argentina) **Juan Manuel Fangio**	Mercedes	4	7	57.14%
1956	(Argentina) **Juan Manuel Fangio**	Ferrari	3	8	37.50%
1957	(Argentina) **Juan Manuel Fangio**	Maserati	4	8	50.00%
1958	(United Kingdom) Stirling Moss	Vanwall	4	11	36.36%
1959	(Australia) **Jack Brabham**	Cooper-Climax	2	9	22.22%
1959	(United Kingdom) Tony Brooks	Ferrari, Vanwall	2	9	22.22%
1959	(United Kingdom) Stirling Moss	Cooper-Climax, Cooper-BRM	2	9	22.22%
1960	(Australia) **Jack Brabham**	Cooper-Climax	5	10	50.00%
1961	(United States) **Phil Hill**	Ferrari	2	8	25.00%
1961	(Germany) Wolfgang von Trips	Ferrari	2	8	25.00%
1961	(United Kingdom) Stirling Moss	Lotus-Climax, Ferguson-Climax	2	8	25.00%
1962	(United Kingdom) **Graham Hill**	BRM	4	9	44.44%
1963	(United Kingdom) **Jim Clark**	Lotus-Climax	7	10	70.00%
1964	(United Kingdom) Jim Clark	Lotus-Climax	3	10	30.00%
1965	(United Kingdom) **Jim Clark**	Lotus-Climax	6	10	60.00%
1966	(Australia) **Jack Brabham**	Brabham-Repco	4	9	44.44%
1967	(United Kingdom) Jim Clark	Lotus-Ford	4	11	36.36%
1968	(United Kingdom) Jackie Stewart	Matra-Ford	3	12	25.00%
1968	(United Kingdom) **Graham Hill**	Lotus-Ford	3	12	25.00%
1969	(United Kingdom) **Jackie Stewart**	Matra-Ford	6	11	54.55%
1970	(Austria) **Jochen Rindt**	Lotus-Ford	5	13	38.46%
1971	(United Kingdom) **Jackie Stewart**	Tyrrell-Ford	6	11	54.55%
1972	(Brazil) **Emerson Fittipaldi**	Lotus-Ford	5	12	41.67%
1973	(United Kingdom) **Jackie Stewart**	Tyrrell-Ford	5	15	33.33%
1974	(Sweden) Ronnie Peterson	Lotus-Ford	3	15	20.00%
1974	(Brazil) **Emerson Fittipaldi**	McLaren-Ford	3	15	20.00%
1974	(Argentina) Carlos Reutemann	Brabham-Ford	3	15	20.00%
1975	(Austria) **Niki Lauda**	Ferrari	5	14	35.71%
1976	(United Kingdom) **James Hunt**	McLaren-Ford	6	16	37.50%
1977	(United States) Mario Andretti	Lotus-Ford	4	17	23.53%
1978	(United States) **Mario Andretti**	Lotus-Ford	6	16	37.50%
1979	(Australia) Alan Jones	Williams-Ford	4	15	26.67%
1980	(Australia) **Alan Jones**	Williams-Ford	5	14	35.71%
1981	(Brazil) **Nelson Piquet**	Brabham-Ford	3	15	20.00%
1981	(France) Alain Prost	Renault	3	15	20.00%
1982	(France) Didier Pironi	Ferrari	2	16	12.50%
1982	(France) Alain Prost	Renault	2	16	12.50%
1982	(France) René Arnoux	Renault	2	16	12.50%
1982	(Austria) Niki Lauda	McLaren-Ford	2	16	12.50%
1982	(United Kingdom) John Watson	McLaren-Ford	2	16	12.50%
1983	(France) Alain Prost	Renault	4	15	26.67%
1984	(France) Alain Prost	McLaren-TAG	7	16	43.75%
1985	(France) **Alain Prost**	McLaren-TAG	5	16	31.25%
1986	(United Kingdom) Nigel Mansell	Williams-Honda	5	16	31.25%
1987	(United Kingdom) Nigel Mansell	Williams-Honda	6	16	37.50%
1988	(Brazil) **Ayrton Senna**	McLaren-Honda	8	16	50.00%
1989	(Brazil) Ayrton Senna	McLaren-Honda	6	16	37.50%
1990	(Brazil) **Ayrton Senna**	McLaren-Honda	6	16	37.50%
1991	(Brazil) **Ayrton Senna**	McLaren-Honda	7	16	43.75%
1992	(United Kingdom) **Nigel Mansell**	Williams-Renault	9	16	56.25%
1993	(France) **Alain Prost**	Williams-Renault	7	16	43.75%
1994	(Germany) **Michael Schumacher**	Benetton-Ford	8	16	50.00%
1995	(Germany) **Michael Schumacher**	Benetton-Renault	9	17	52.94%
1996	(United Kingdom) **Damon Hill**	Williams-Renault	8	16	50.00%
1997	(Canada) **Jacques Villeneuve**	Williams-Renault	7	17	41.18%
1998	(Finland) **Mika Häkkinen**	McLaren-Mercedes	8	16	50.00%
1999	(Finland) **Mika Häkkinen**	McLaren-Mercedes	5	16	31.25%
2000	(Germany) **Michael Schumacher**	Ferrari	9	17	52.94%
2001	(Germany) **Michael Schumacher**	Ferrari	9	17	52.94%
2002	(Germany) **Michael Schumacher**	Ferrari	11	17	64.71%
2003	(Germany) **Michael Schumacher**	Ferrari	6	16	37.50%
2004	(Germany) **Michael Schumacher**	Ferrari	13	18	72.22%
2005	(Finland) Kimi Räikkönen	McLaren-Mercedes	7	19	36.84%
2005	(Spain) **Fernando Alonso**	Renault	7	19	36.84%
2006	(Germany) Michael Schumacher	Ferrari	7	18	38.89%
2006	(Spain) **Fernando Alonso**	Renault	7	18	38.89%
2007	(Finland) **Kimi Räikkönen**	Ferrari	6	17	35.29%
2008	(Brazil) Felipe Massa	Ferrari	6	18	33.33%
2009	(United Kingdom) **Jenson Button**	Brawn-Mercedes	6	17	35.29%
2010	(Spain) Fernando Alonso	Ferrari	5	19	26.32%
2010	(Germany) **Sebastian Vettel**	Red Bull-Renault	5	19	26.32%
2011	(Germany) **Sebastian Vettel**	Red Bull-Renault	11	19	57.89%
2012	(Germany) **Sebastian Vettel**	Red Bull-Renault	5	20	25.00%
2013	(Germany) **Sebastian Vettel**	Red Bull-Renault	13	19	68.42%
2014	(United Kingdom) **Lewis Hamilton**	Mercedes	11	19	57.89%
2015	(United Kingdom) **Lewis Hamilton**	Mercedes	10	19	52.63%
2016	(United Kingdom) Lewis Hamilton	Mercedes	10	21	47.62%
2017	(United Kingdom) **Lewis Hamilton**	Mercedes	9	20	45.00%
2018	(United Kingdom) **Lewis Hamilton**	Mercedes	11	21	52.38%
2019	(United Kingdom) **Lewis Hamilton**	Mercedes	11	21	52.38%
2020	(United Kingdom) **Lewis Hamilton**	Mercedes	11	17	64.71%
2021	(Netherlands) **Max Verstappen**	Red Bull Racing-Honda	10	22	45.45%
2022	(Netherlands) **Max Verstappen**	Red Bull Racing-RBPT	15	22	68.18%
2023	(Netherlands) **Max Verstappen**	Red Bull Racing-Honda RBPT	19	22	86.36%
2024	(Netherlands) **Max Verstappen**	Red Bull Racing-Honda RBPT	9	24	37.50%
2025	(Netherlands) Max Verstappen	Red Bull Racing-Honda RBPT	8	24	33.33%
2026	(Italy) **Kimi Antonelli**	Mercedes	9*	21*	42.86%*

* Season still in progress.

== Record progression ==
Progression of the record for most F1 Grand Prix wins

Record progression of most Formula One career wins
Driver	Win count	Achieved at
(Italy) Giuseppe Farina	1	1950 British Grand Prix
(Argentina) Juan Manuel Fangio	1	1950 Monaco Grand Prix
(United States) Johnnie Parsons	1	1950 Indianapolis 500
(Italy) Giuseppe Farina	2	1950 Swiss Grand Prix
(Argentina) Juan Manuel Fangio	2–3	1950 Belgian Grand Prix
(Italy) Giuseppe Farina	3	1950 Italian Grand Prix
(Argentina) Juan Manuel Fangio	4	1951 Swiss Grand Prix
(Italy) Giuseppe Farina	4	1951 Belgian Grand Prix
(Argentina) Juan Manuel Fangio	5–6	1951 French Grand Prix
(Italy) Alberto Ascari	6–13	1952 German Grand Prix
(Argentina) Juan Manuel Fangio	13–24	1954 Italian Grand Prix
(United Kingdom) Jim Clark	24–25	1967 Mexican Grand Prix
(United Kingdom) Jackie Stewart	25–27	1973 Monaco Grand Prix
(France) Alain Prost	27–51	1987 Belgian Grand Prix
(Germany) Michael Schumacher	51–91	2001 Hungarian Grand Prix
(United Kingdom) Lewis Hamilton	91–106	2020 Eifel Grand Prix

== See also ==
- List of Formula One Grand Prix winners (constructors)
- List of Formula One polesitters
- List of Formula One drivers who set a fastest lap
- List of Formula One sprint winners
- List of Formula One driver records
- Most Grand Prix wins by engine manufacturer

== Bibliography ==
- Hughes, Mark; Tremayne, David (2002). The Concise Encyclopedia of Formula 1. Parragon. ISBN 0-75258-766-8.
- Smith, Roger (2019). Formula 1 All The Races: The First 1000. Veloce Publishing. ISBN 978-1-787115-66-8.
