= List of Formula One polesitters =

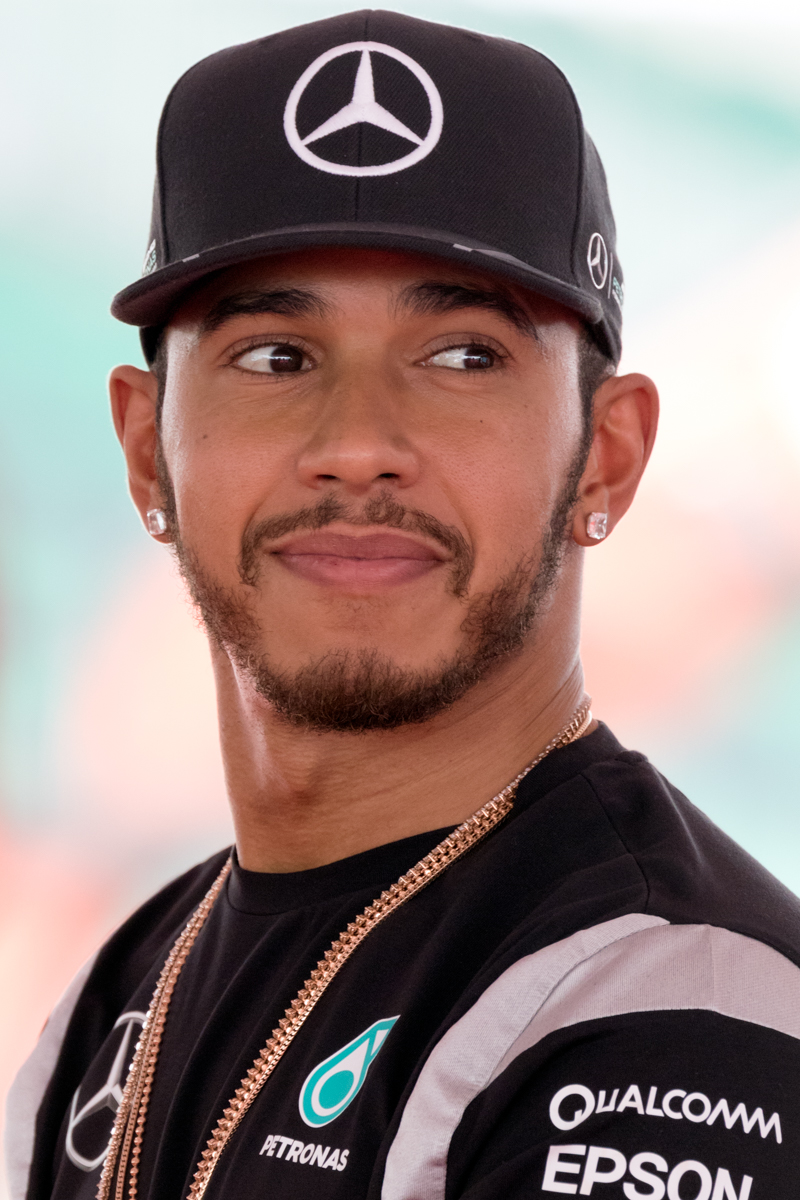
Lewis Hamilton holds the record for the most career pole positions with 105.

Formula One, abbreviated to F1, is the highest class of open-wheeled auto racing defined by the Fédération Internationale de l'Automobile (FIA), motorsport's world governing body. The "formula" in the name refers to a set of rules to which all participants and cars must conform. The F1 World Championship season consists of a series of races, known as Grands Prix, held usually on purpose-built circuits, and in a few cases on closed city streets. The polesitter is the driver that has qualified for a Grand Prix in pole position, at the front of the starting grid. Out of the 1,170 completed Grands Prix (as of the 2026 Las Vegas Grand Prix), the driver that has started in first has gone on to win the race 512 times.

Qualifying is traditionally contested on the Saturday (Friday for some events) of a Grand Prix weekend to determine the drivers' positions on the starting grid of the race held on the Sunday (although across 2021 and 2022, in a small number of the events, so-called sprint races were held, which determined the starting grid of the race on Sunday. In 2021, the winner of the sprint was credited with pole position. In 2022, the pole-sitter of the sprint race was officially awarded the pole position in those events. Since 2023, sprint races have been held at select events, these have had their own qualifying session, the polesitter for these races is not credited with a pole position.) Historically, there have been a number of different qualifying systems; previously, each driver was only allowed a single lap to set his qualifying time. Drivers currently have to compete in three rounds before pole position is determined. The first round, known as Q1, is contested by twenty two drivers in an 18-minute session, at the end of which the six slowest cars are eliminated. This is followed by Q2, a 15-minute session, where the slowest six are again eliminated. The remaining ten cars contest Q3, the final 13-minute session, to determine their places on the grid and who will sit on pole position.

Lewis Hamilton holds the record for the most pole positions, having qualified first on 105 occasions. Michael Schumacher is second with 68 pole positions. Ayrton Senna is third with 65 poles. Senna and Max Verstappen jointly hold the record for most consecutive pole positions; Senna qualified in first place in eight Grands Prix in a row from the 1988 Spanish Grand Prix to the 1989 United States Grand Prix, with Verstappen's record streak lasting from the 2023 Abu Dhabi Grand Prix to the 2024 Emilia Romagna Grand Prix. Kimi Antonelli is the youngest polesitter; he was 19 years, 201 days old when he qualified in first place for the 2026 Chinese Grand Prix. (Note: Antonelli is also the youngest polesitter in sprint format; he was 18 years, 8 months, and 7 days old when he qualified in first place for the 2025 Miami Grand Prix's sprint race.) The oldest person to qualify in pole position was Nino Farina, who was 47 years, 79 days old when he was polesitter for the 1954 Argentine Grand Prix. As of the 2026 Las Vegas Grand Prix, 109 drivers have been on pole position in the 1,170 Grands Prix since the first World Championship race, the 1950 British Grand Prix, with the most recent driver to achieve their first pole position being Pierre Gasly at the 2026 Italian Grand Prix. From 2014 to 2017, the driver with the most pole positions in a season was awarded the Pole Trophy. The inaugural Pole Trophy was won by Nico Rosberg. In 2018, the FIA Pole Trophy was discontinued and replaced with the Pirelli Pole Position Award, where the polesitter at each race is awarded a Pirelli wind tunnel tyre with the name of the polesitter and their time.

== By driver ==
Key
*	Driver has competed in the 2026 season
‡	Formula One World Champion
†	Driver has competed in the 2026 season and is a Formula One World Champion

Formula One polesitters
Rank	Driver	Nationality	Poles	Entries	Seasons active	First pole	Last pole
1	Lewis Hamilton^{†}	United Kingdom	105	401	2007–	2007 Canadian Grand Prix	2026 Mexico City Grand Prix
2	Michael Schumacher^{‡}	Germany	68	308	1991–2006, 2010–2012	1994 Monaco Grand Prix	2006 French Grand Prix
3	Ayrton Senna^{‡}	Brazil	65	162	1984–1994	1985 Portuguese Grand Prix	1994 San Marino Grand Prix
4	Sebastian Vettel^{‡}	Germany	57	300	2007–2022	2008 Italian Grand Prix	2019 Japanese Grand Prix
5	Max Verstappen^{†}	Netherlands	51	254	2015–	2019 Hungarian Grand Prix	2026 Las Vegas Grand Prix
6	Jim Clark^{‡}	United Kingdom	33	73	1960–1968	1962 Monaco Grand Prix	1968 South African Grand Prix
6	Alain Prost^{‡}	France	33	202	1980–1991, 1993	1981 German Grand Prix	1993 Japanese Grand Prix
8	Nigel Mansell^{‡}	United Kingdom	32	191	1980–1992, 1994–1995	1984 Dallas Grand Prix	1994 Australian Grand Prix
9	Nico Rosberg^{‡}	Germany	30	206	2006–2016	2012 Chinese Grand Prix	2016 Japanese Grand Prix
10	Juan Manuel Fangio^{‡}	Argentina	29	52	1950–1951, 1953–1958	1950 Monaco Grand Prix	1958 Argentine Grand Prix
11	Charles Leclerc*	Monaco	27	194	2018–	2019 Bahrain Grand Prix	2025 Hungarian Grand Prix
12	Mika Häkkinen^{‡}	Finland	26	165	1991–2001	1997 Luxembourg Grand Prix	2000 Belgian Grand Prix
13	Niki Lauda^{‡}	Austria	24	177	1971–1979, 1982–1985	1974 South African Grand Prix	1978 South African Grand Prix
13	Nelson Piquet^{‡}	Brazil	24	207	1978–1991	1980 United States Grand Prix West	1987 Spanish Grand Prix
15	Fernando Alonso^{†}	Spain	22	449	2001, 2003–2018, 2021–	2003 Malaysian Grand Prix	2012 German Grand Prix
16	Damon Hill^{‡}	United Kingdom	20	122	1992–1999	1993 French Grand Prix	1996 Portuguese Grand Prix
16	Valtteri Bottas*	Finland	20	247	2013–2024, 2026–	2017 Bahrain Grand Prix	2021 São Paulo Grand Prix
16	Lando Norris^{†}	United Kingdom	20	173	2019–	2021 Russian Grand Prix	2026 São Paulo Grand Prix
19	Mario Andretti^{‡}	United States	18	131	1968–1972, 1974–1982	1968 United States Grand Prix	1982 Italian Grand Prix
19	René Arnoux	France	18	165	1978–1989	1979 Austrian Grand Prix	1983 British Grand Prix
19	Kimi Räikkönen^{‡}	Finland	18	353	2001–2009, 2012–2021	2003 European Grand Prix	2018 Italian Grand Prix
22	Jackie Stewart^{‡}	United Kingdom	17	100	1965–1973	1969 Monaco Grand Prix	1973 German Grand Prix
23	Stirling Moss	United Kingdom	16	67	1951–1961	1955 British Grand Prix	1961 Monaco Grand Prix
23	Felipe Massa	Brazil	16	272	2002, 2004–2017	2006 Turkish Grand Prix	2014 Austrian Grand Prix
25	Alberto Ascari^{‡}	Italy	14	33	1950–1955	1951 German Grand Prix	1954 Spanish Grand Prix
25	James Hunt^{‡}	United Kingdom	14	93	1973–1979	1976 Brazilian Grand Prix	1977 United States Grand Prix
25	Ronnie Peterson	Sweden	14	123	1970–1978	1973 Brazilian Grand Prix	1978 Austrian Grand Prix
25	Rubens Barrichello	Brazil	14	326	1993–2011	1994 Belgian Grand Prix	2009 Brazilian Grand Prix
29	Graham Hill^{‡}	United Kingdom	13	179	1958–1975	1962 Belgian Grand Prix	1968 British Grand Prix
29	Jack Brabham^{‡}	Australia	13	128	1955–1970	1959 British Grand Prix	1970 Spanish Grand Prix
29	Jacky Ickx	Belgium	13	122	1967–1979	1968 German Grand Prix	1972 Italian Grand Prix
29	Jacques Villeneuve^{‡}	Canada	13	165	1996–2006	1996 Australian Grand Prix	1997 European Grand Prix
29	Juan Pablo Montoya	Colombia	13	95	2001–2006	2001 German Grand Prix	2005 Belgian Grand Prix
29	Mark Webber	Australia	13	217	2002–2013	2009 German Grand Prix	2013 Abu Dhabi Grand Prix
35	Gerhard Berger	Austria	12	210	1984–1997	1987 Portuguese Grand Prix	1997 German Grand Prix
35	David Coulthard	United Kingdom	12	247	1994–2008	1995 Argentine Grand Prix	2001 Monaco Grand Prix
35	George Russell*	United Kingdom	12	173	2019–	2022 Hungarian Grand Prix	2026 Azerbaijan Grand Prix
38	Jochen Rindt^{‡}	Austria	10	62	1964–1970	1968 French Grand Prix	1970 Austrian Grand Prix
39	John Surtees^{‡}	United Kingdom	8	113	1960–1972	1960 Portuguese Grand Prix	1968 Italian Grand Prix
39	Riccardo Patrese	Italy	8	257	1977–1993	1981 United States Grand Prix West	1992 Hungarian Grand Prix
39	Jenson Button^{‡}	United Kingdom	8	309	2000–2017	2004 San Marino Grand Prix	2012 Belgian Grand Prix
42	Jacques Laffite	France	7	180	1974–1986	1976 Italian Grand Prix	1981 Spanish Grand Prix
42	Kimi Antonelli†	Italy	7	45	2025–	2026 Chinese Grand Prix	2026 United States Grand Prix
44	Phil Hill^{‡}	United States	6	51	1958–1964, 1966	1960 Italian Grand Prix	1961 German Grand Prix
44	Emerson Fittipaldi^{‡}	Brazil	6	149	1970–1980	1972 Monaco Grand Prix	1974 Canadian Grand Prix
44	Jean-Pierre Jabouille	France	6	55	1974–1975, 1977–1981	1979 South African Grand Prix	1980 South African Grand Prix
44	Alan Jones^{‡}	Australia	6	117	1975–1981, 1983, 1985–1986	1979 British Grand Prix	1980 German Grand Prix
44	Carlos Reutemann	Argentina	6	146	1972–1982	1972 Argentine Grand Prix	1981 Caesars Palace Grand Prix
44	Ralf Schumacher	Germany	6	182	1997–2007	2001 French Grand Prix	2005 Japanese Grand Prix
44	Carlos Sainz Jr.*	Spain	6	254	2015–	2022 British Grand Prix	2024 Mexico City Grand Prix
44	Oscar Piastri*	Australia	6	91	2023–	2025 Chinese Grand Prix	2025 Qatar Grand Prix
52	Nino Farina^{‡}	Italy	5	36	1950–1955	1950 British Grand Prix	1954 Argentine Grand Prix
52	Chris Amon	New Zealand	5	108	1963–1976	1968 Spanish Grand Prix	1972 French Grand Prix
52	Clay Regazzoni	Switzerland	5	139	1970–1980	1970 Mexican Grand Prix	1976 United States Grand Prix West
52	Patrick Tambay	France	5	123	1977–1979, 1981–1986	1983 United States Grand Prix West	1984 French Grand Prix
52	Keke Rosberg^{‡}	Finland	5	128	1978–1986	1982 British Grand Prix	1986 German Grand Prix
57	Mike Hawthorn^{‡}	United Kingdom	4	47	1952–1958	1958 Belgian Grand Prix	1958 Moroccan Grand Prix
57	Didier Pironi	France	4	72	1978–1982	1980 Monaco Grand Prix	1982 German Grand Prix
57	Jarno Trulli	Italy	4	256	1997–2011	2004 Monaco Grand Prix	2009 Bahrain Grand Prix
57	Giancarlo Fisichella	Italy	4	231	1996–2009	1998 Austrian Grand Prix	2009 Belgian Grand Prix
61	José Froilán González	Argentina	3	26	1950–1957, 1960	1951 British Grand Prix	1955 Argentine Grand Prix
61	Tony Brooks	United Kingdom	3	39	1956–1961	1958 Monaco Grand Prix	1959 German Grand Prix
61	Dan Gurney	United States	3	87	1959–1968, 1970	1962 German Grand Prix	1964 Belgian Grand Prix
61	Jean-Pierre Jarier	France	3	143	1971, 1973–1983	1975 Argentine Grand Prix	1978 Canadian Grand Prix
61	Jody Scheckter^{‡}	South Africa	3	113	1972–1980	1976 Swedish Grand Prix	1979 Monaco Grand Prix
61	Elio de Angelis	Italy	3	109	1979–1986	1983 European Grand Prix	1985 Canadian Grand Prix
61	Teo Fabi	Italy	3	71	1982, 1984–1987	1985 German Grand Prix	1986 Italian Grand Prix
61	Daniel Ricciardo	Australia	3	258	2011–2024	2016 Monaco Grand Prix	2018 Mexican Grand Prix
61	Sergio Pérez*	Mexico	3	285	2011–2024, 2026	2022 Saudi Arabian Grand Prix	2023 Miami Grand Prix
70	Stuart Lewis-Evans	United Kingdom	2	14	1957–1958	1957 Italian Grand Prix	1958 Dutch Grand Prix
70	Jo Siffert	Switzerland	2	100	1962–1971	1968 Mexican Grand Prix	1971 Austrian Grand Prix
70	John Watson	United Kingdom	2	154	1973–1983, 1985	1977 Monaco Grand Prix	1978 French Grand Prix
70	Gilles Villeneuve	Canada	2	68	1977–1982	1979 United States Grand Prix West	1981 San Marino Grand Prix
70	Michele Alboreto	Italy	2	215	1981–1994	1984 Belgian Grand Prix	1985 Brazilian Grand Prix
70	Jean Alesi	France	2	202	1989–2001	1994 Italian Grand Prix	1997 Italian Grand Prix
70	Heinz-Harald Frentzen	Germany	2	160	1994–2003	1997 Monaco Grand Prix	1999 European Grand Prix
77	Walt Faulkner	United States	1	6	1950–1951, 1953–1955	1950 Indianapolis 500	1950 Indianapolis 500
77	Duke Nalon	United States	1	5	1951–1953	1951 Indianapolis 500	1951 Indianapolis 500
77	Fred Agabashian	United States	1	9	1950–1957	1952 Indianapolis 500	1952 Indianapolis 500
77	Bill Vukovich	United States	1	6	1951–1955	1953 Indianapolis 500	1953 Indianapolis 500
77	Jack McGrath	United States	1	6	1950–1955	1954 Indianapolis 500	1954 Indianapolis 500
77	Jerry Hoyt	United States	1	5	1950, 1953–1955	1955 Indianapolis 500	1955 Indianapolis 500
77	Eugenio Castellotti	Italy	1	14	1955–1957	1955 Belgian Grand Prix	1955 Belgian Grand Prix
77	Pat Flaherty	United States	1	6	1950, 1953–1956, 1959	1956 Indianapolis 500	1956 Indianapolis 500
77	Pat O'Connor	United States	1	6	1954–1958	1957 Indianapolis 500	1957 Indianapolis 500
77	Dick Rathmann	United States	1	6	1950, 1956–1960	1958 Indianapolis 500	1958 Indianapolis 500
77	Johnny Thomson	United States	1	8	1953–1960	1959 Indianapolis 500	1959 Indianapolis 500
77	Jo Bonnier	Sweden	1	108	1956–1971	1959 Dutch Grand Prix	1959 Dutch Grand Prix
77	Eddie Sachs	United States	1	7	1957–1960	1960 Indianapolis 500	1960 Indianapolis 500
77	Wolfgang von Trips	Germany	1	29	1956–1961	1961 Italian Grand Prix	1961 Italian Grand Prix
77	Lorenzo Bandini	Italy	1	42	1961–1967	1966 French Grand Prix	1966 French Grand Prix
77	Mike Parkes	United Kingdom	1	7	1959, 1966–1967	1966 Italian Grand Prix	1966 Italian Grand Prix
77	Peter Revson	United States	1	32	1964, 1971–1974	1972 Canadian Grand Prix	1972 Canadian Grand Prix
77	Denny Hulme^{‡}	New Zealand	1	112	1965–1974	1973 South African Grand Prix	1973 South African Grand Prix
77	Patrick Depailler	France	1	95	1972, 1974–1980	1974 Swedish Grand Prix	1974 Swedish Grand Prix
77	José Carlos Pace	Brazil	1	73	1972–1977	1975 South African Grand Prix	1975 South African Grand Prix
77	Vittorio Brambilla	Italy	1	79	1974–1980	1975 Swedish Grand Prix	1975 Swedish Grand Prix
77	Tom Pryce	United Kingdom	1	42	1974–1977	1975 British Grand Prix	1975 British Grand Prix
77	Bruno Giacomelli	Italy	1	82	1977–1983, 1990	1980 United States Grand Prix	1980 United States Grand Prix
77	Andrea de Cesaris	Italy	1	214	1980–1994	1982 United States Grand Prix West	1982 United States Grand Prix West
77	Thierry Boutsen	Belgium	1	164	1983–1993	1990 Hungarian Grand Prix	1990 Hungarian Grand Prix
77	Nick Heidfeld	Germany	1	185	2000–2011	2005 European Grand Prix	2005 European Grand Prix
77	Robert Kubica	Poland	1	99	2006–2010, 2019, 2021	2008 Bahrain Grand Prix	2008 Bahrain Grand Prix
77	Heikki Kovalainen	Finland	1	112	2007–2013	2008 British Grand Prix	2008 British Grand Prix
77	Nico Hülkenberg*	Germany	1	275	2010, 2012–2020, 2022–	2010 Brazilian Grand Prix	2010 Brazilian Grand Prix
77	Pastor Maldonado	Venezuela	1	96	2011–2015	2012 Spanish Grand Prix	2012 Spanish Grand Prix
77	Lance Stroll*	Canada	1	214	2017–	2020 Turkish Grand Prix	2020 Turkish Grand Prix
77	Kevin Magnussen	Denmark	1	187	2014–2020, 2022–2024	2022 São Paulo Grand Prix	2022 São Paulo Grand Prix
77	Pierre Gasly*	France	1	199	2017–	2026 Italian Grand Prix	2026 Italian Grand Prix

Progression of the record for most Formula One pole positions

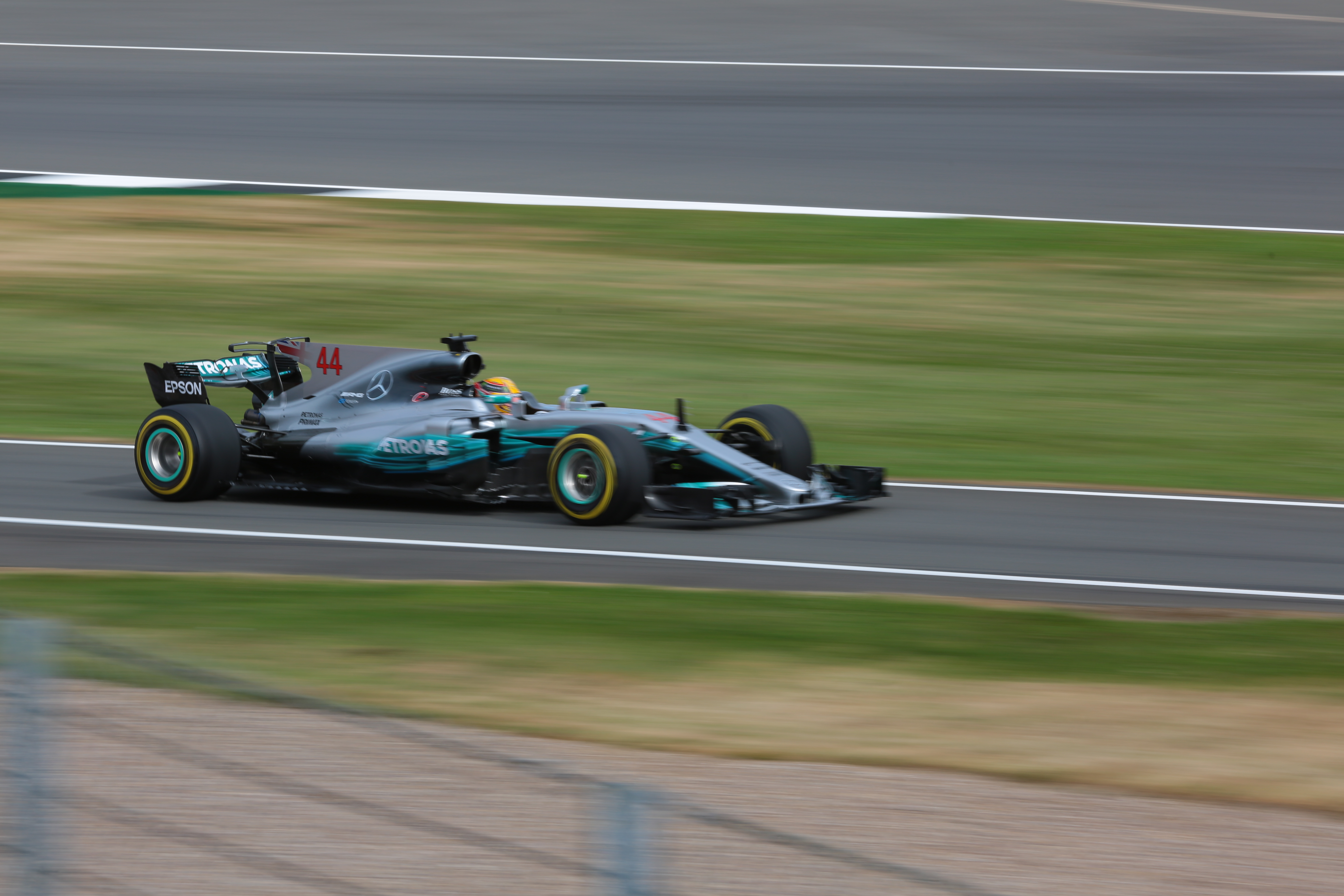
Seven-time world champion Lewis Hamilton holds the record for most pole positions, and for the most wins from pole.

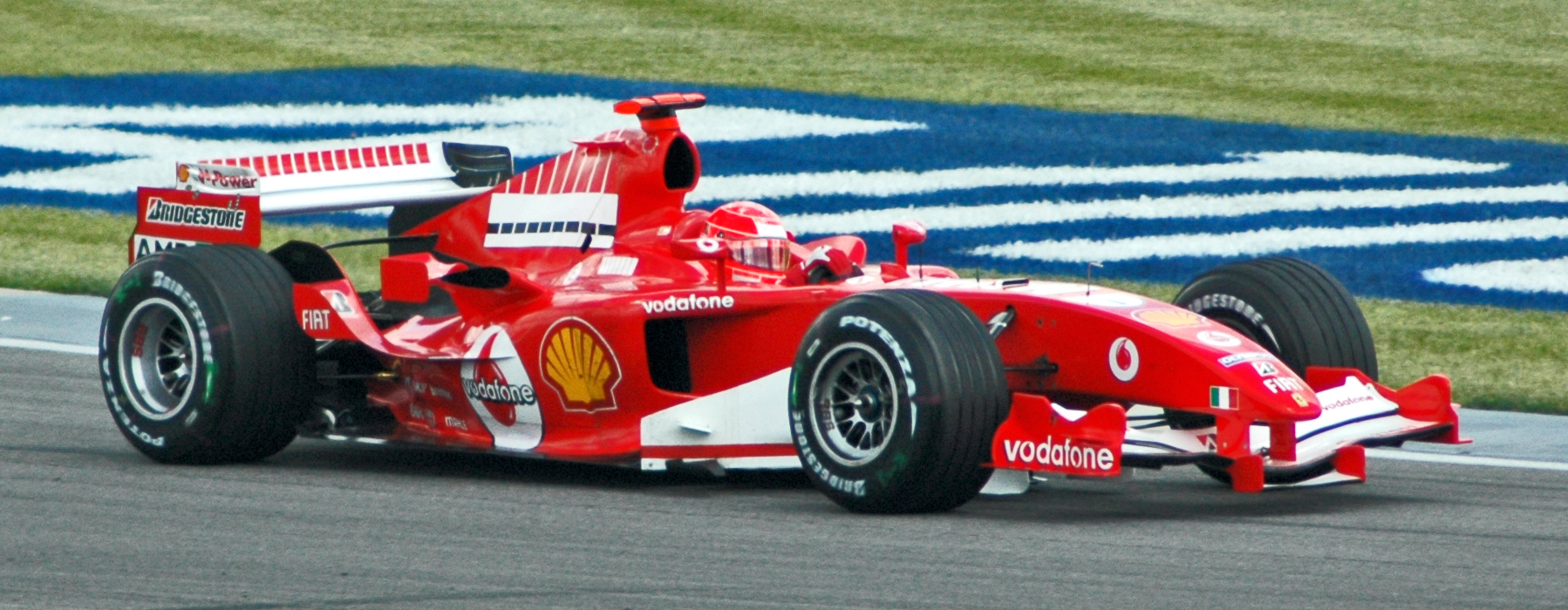
Seven-time world champion Michael Schumacher achieved 68 pole positions, 10 with Benetton and 58 with Ferrari.

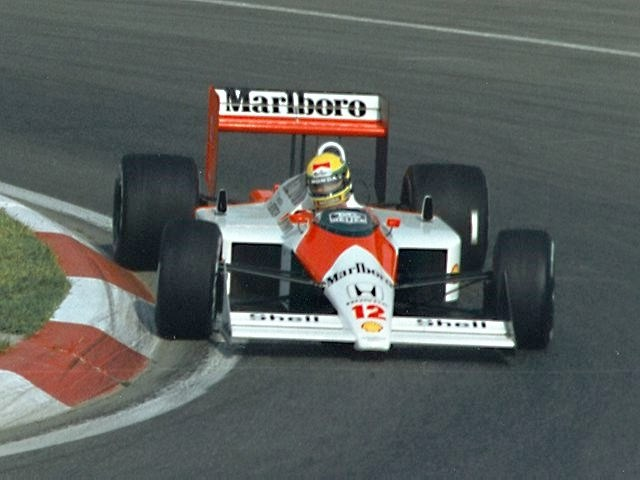
Ayrton Senna was known for consistently high qualifying performance.

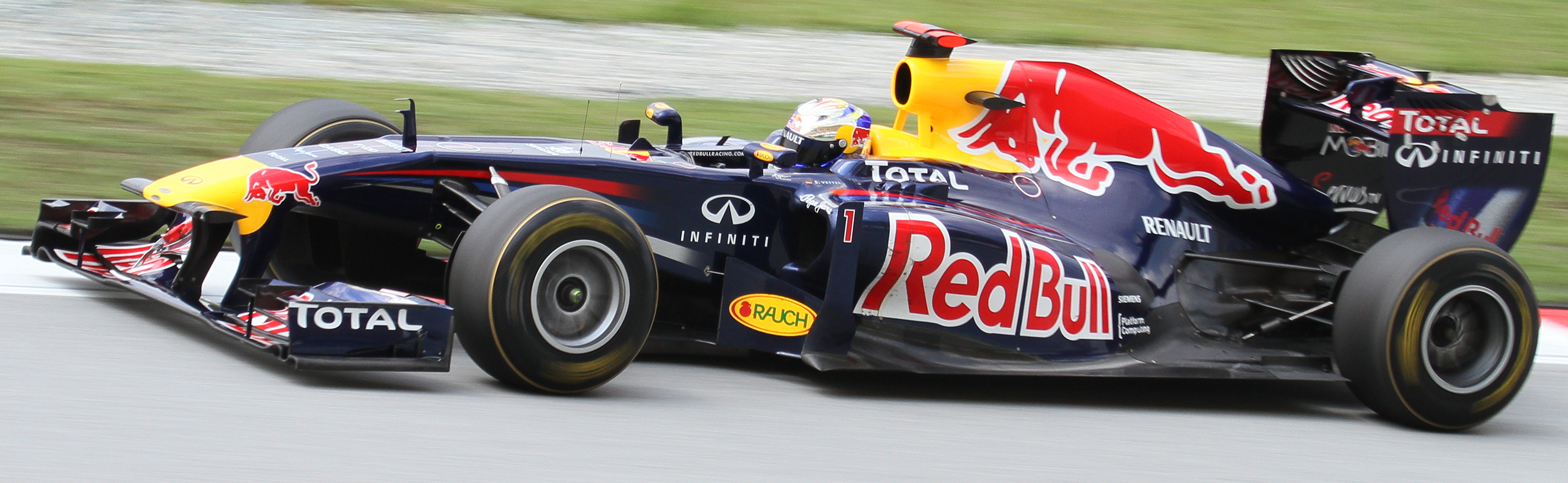
Sebastian Vettel achieved 44 of his pole position tally with Red Bull Racing, for whom he also won four consecutive titles.

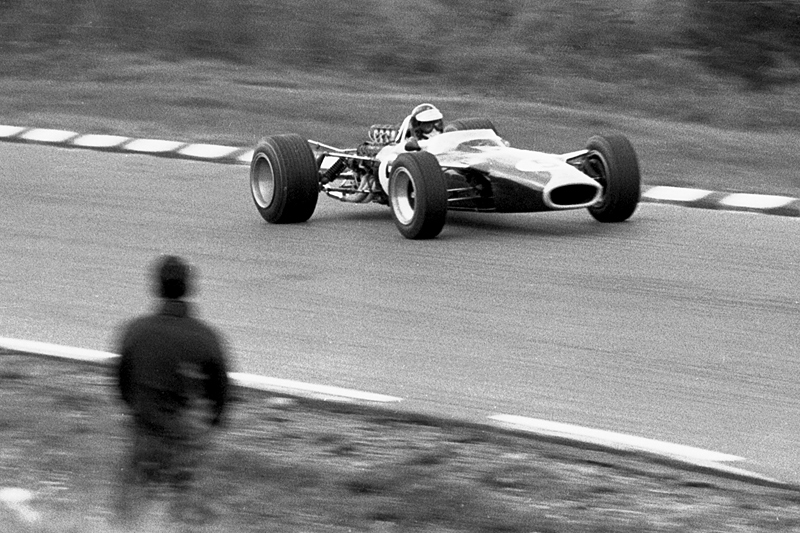
Jim Clark held the record for most F1 pole positions for 22 years (1967–1989).

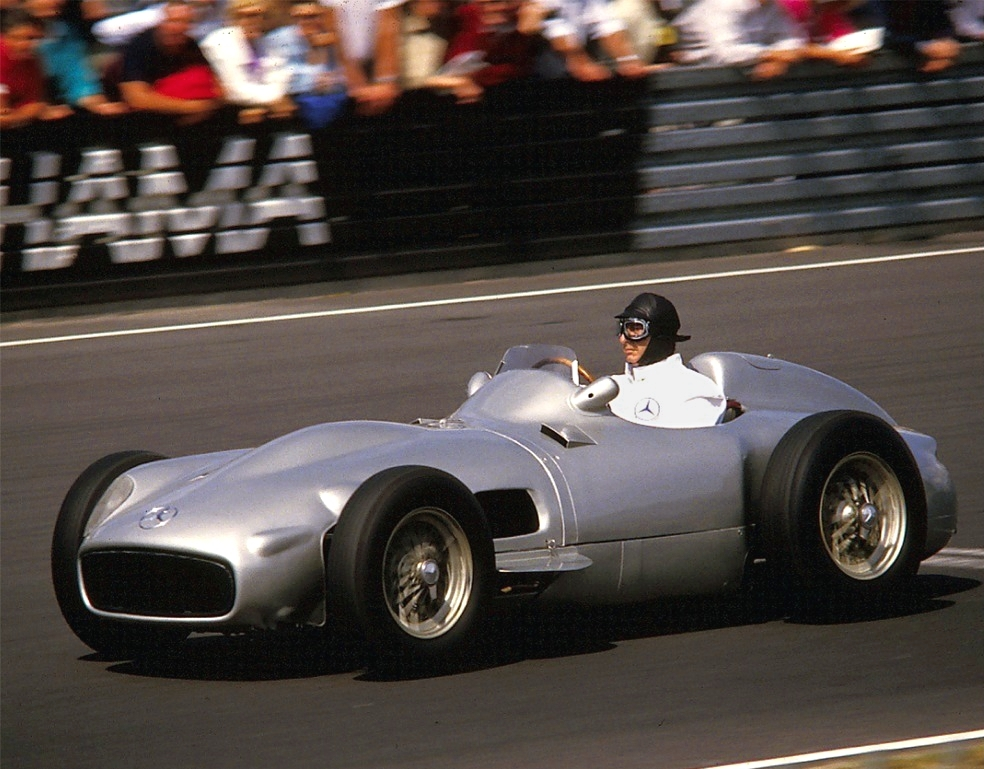
Juan Manuel Fangio is a five-time world champion, and holds the record for the highest percentage of pole positions (qualified on pole in 56% of races entered).

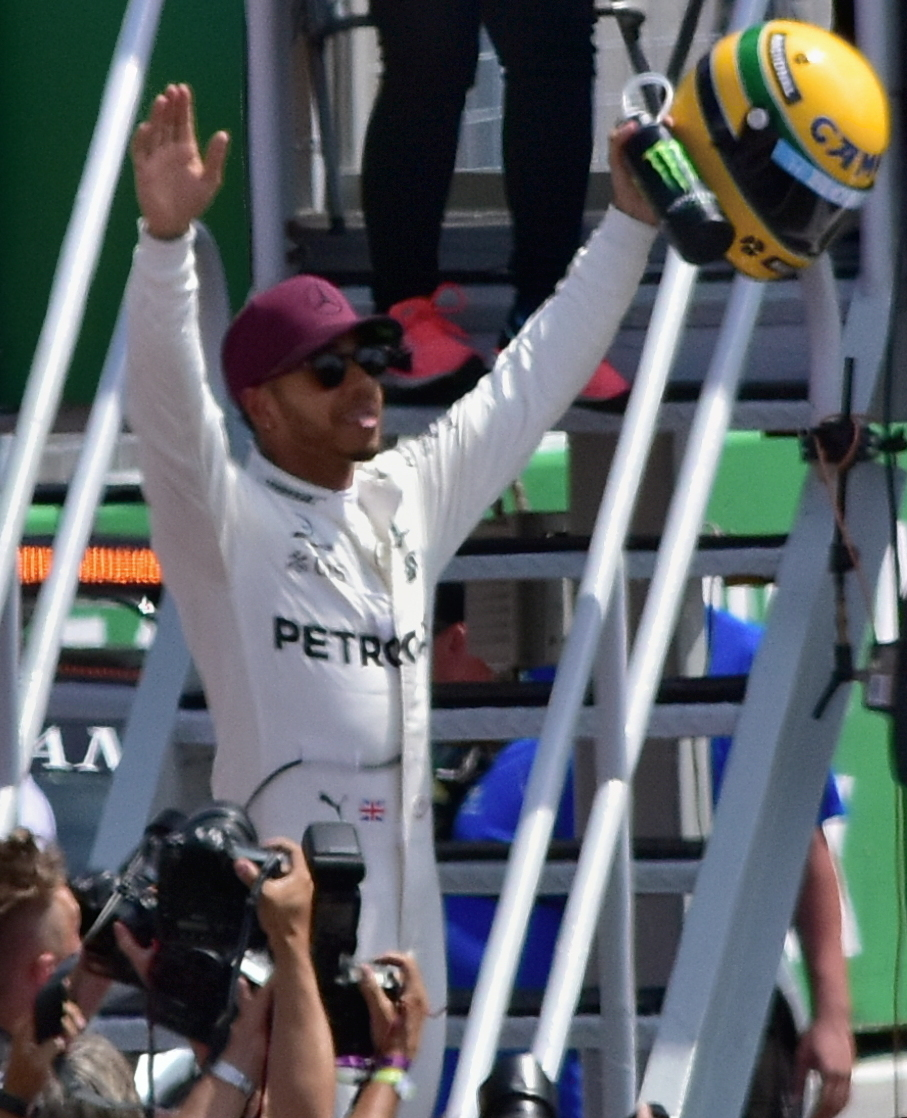
Lewis Hamilton raises Ayrton Senna's helmet, offered by the latter's family on matching the Brazilian driver's record tally of pole positions at the 2017 Canadian Grand Prix.

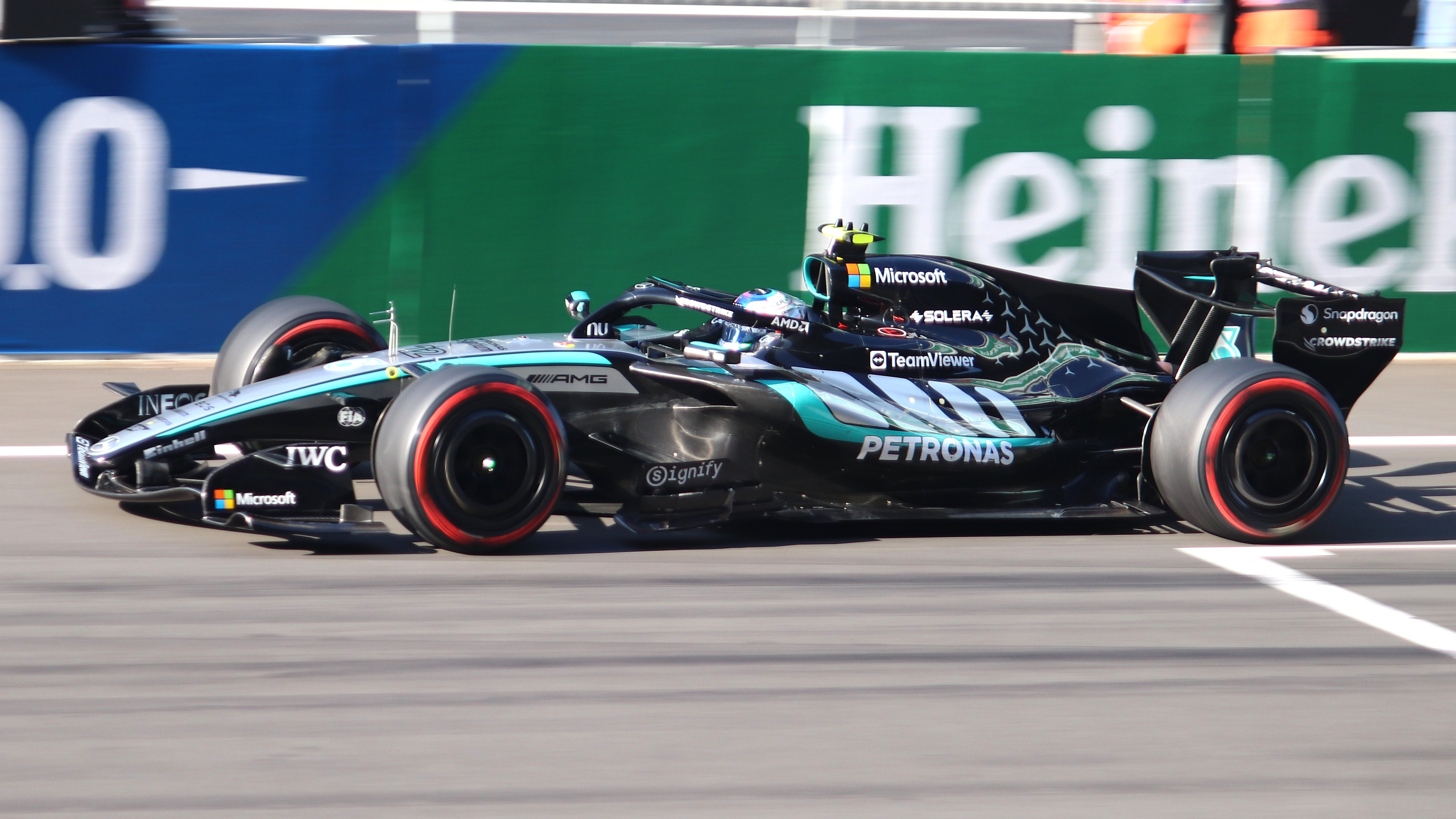
Kimi Antonelli is the youngest first-time polesitter, having secured his first pole position at the 2026 Chinese Grand Prix at the age of 19 years, 201 days.

Pierre Gasly is the 109th and latest first-time polesitter, having secured pole position at the 2026 Italian Grand Prix.

== By nationality ==
Formula One polesitters by country
Country	Poles	Driver(s)
United Kingdom	324	19
Germany	166	8
Brazil	126	6
France	80	10
Finland	70	5
Italy	55	14
Netherlands	51	1
Austria	46	3
Australia	41	5
United States	39	15
Argentina	38	3
Spain	28	2
Monaco	27	1
Canada	16	3
Sweden	15	2
Belgium	14	2
Colombia	13	1
Switzerland	7	2
New Zealand	6	2
South Africa	3	1
Mexico	3	1
Poland	1	1
Venezuela	1	1
Denmark	1	1

== Most pole positions per season ==
Key
	Driver has competed in the 2026 season
**Bold**	Won the World Championship in the same year

Highest number of pole positions per season
Year	Driver(s)	Constructor(s)	Poles	Races	Ref.
1950	(Argentina) Juan Manuel Fangio	Alfa Romeo	4	7	
1951	(Argentina) **Juan Manuel Fangio**	Alfa Romeo	4	8	
1952	(Italy) **Alberto Ascari**	Ferrari	5	8	
1953	(Italy) **Alberto Ascari**	Ferrari	6	9	
1954	(Argentina) **Juan Manuel Fangio**	Maserati, Mercedes	5	9	
1955	(Argentina) **Juan Manuel Fangio**	Mercedes	3	7	
1956	(Argentina) **Juan Manuel Fangio**	Ferrari	6	8	
1957	(Argentina) **Juan Manuel Fangio**	Maserati	4	8	
1958	(United Kingdom) **Mike Hawthorn**	Ferrari	4	11	
1959	(United Kingdom) Stirling Moss	Cooper-Climax	4	9	
1960	(United Kingdom) Stirling Moss	Cooper-Climax	4	10	
1961	(United States) **Phil Hill**	Ferrari	5	8	
1962	(United Kingdom) Jim Clark	Lotus-Climax	6	9	
1963	(United Kingdom) **Jim Clark**	Lotus-Climax	7	10	
1964	(United Kingdom) Jim Clark	Lotus-Climax	5	10	
1965	(United Kingdom) **Jim Clark**	Lotus-Climax	6	10	
1966	(Australia) **Jack Brabham**	Brabham-Repco	3	9	
1967	(United Kingdom) Jim Clark	Lotus-Ford	6	11	
1968	(New Zealand) Chris Amon	Ferrari	3	12	
1969	(Austria) Jochen Rindt	Lotus-Ford	5	11	
1970	(United Kingdom) Jackie Stewart	Tyrrell-Ford	4	13	
1970	(Belgium) Jacky Ickx	Ferrari	4	13	
1971	(United Kingdom) **Jackie Stewart**	Tyrrell-Ford	6	11	
1972	(Belgium) Jacky Ickx	Ferrari	4	12	
1973	(Sweden) Ronnie Peterson	Lotus-Ford	9	15	
1974	(Austria) Niki Lauda	Ferrari	9	15	
1975	(Austria) **Niki Lauda**	Ferrari	9	14	
1976	(United Kingdom) **James Hunt**	McLaren-Ford	8	16	
1977	(United States) Mario Andretti	Lotus-Ford	7	17	
1978	(United States) **Mario Andretti**	Lotus-Ford	8	16	
1979	(France) Jacques Laffite	Ligier-Ford	4	15	
1979	(France) Jean-Pierre Jabouille	Renault	4	15	
1980	(Australia) **Alan Jones**	Williams-Ford	3	14	
1980	(France) René Arnoux	Renault	3	14	
1981	(France) René Arnoux	Renault	4	15	
1981	(Brazil) **Nelson Piquet**	Brabham-Ford	4	15	
1982	(France) René Arnoux	Renault	5	16	
1982	(France) Alain Prost	Renault	5	16	
1983	(France) René Arnoux	Ferrari	4	15	
1983	(France) Patrick Tambay	Ferrari	4	15	
1984	(Brazil) Nelson Piquet	Brabham-BMW	9	16	
1985	(Brazil) Ayrton Senna	Lotus-Renault	7	16	
1986	(Brazil) Ayrton Senna	Lotus-Renault	8	16	
1987	(United Kingdom) Nigel Mansell	Williams-Honda	8	16	
1988	**(Brazil) Ayrton Senna**	McLaren-Honda	13	16	
1989	(Brazil) Ayrton Senna	McLaren-Honda	13	16	
1990	(Brazil) **Ayrton Senna**	McLaren-Honda	10	16	
1991	(Brazil) **Ayrton Senna**	McLaren-Honda	8	16	
1992	(United Kingdom) **Nigel Mansell**	Williams-Renault	14	16	
1993	(France) **Alain Prost**	Williams-Renault	13	16	
1994	(Germany) **Michael Schumacher**	Benetton-Ford	6	16	
1995	(United Kingdom) Damon Hill	Williams-Renault	7	17	
1996	(United Kingdom) **Damon Hill**	Williams-Renault	9	16	
1997	(Canada) **Jacques Villeneuve**	Williams-Renault	10	17	
1998	(Finland) **Mika Häkkinen**	McLaren-Mercedes	9	16	
1999	(Finland) **Mika Häkkinen**	McLaren-Mercedes	11	16	
2000	(Germany) **Michael Schumacher**	Ferrari	9	17	
2001	(Germany) **Michael Schumacher**	Ferrari	11	17	
2002	(Colombia) Juan Pablo Montoya	Williams-BMW	7	17	
2002	(Germany) **Michael Schumacher**	Ferrari	7	17	
2003	(Germany) **Michael Schumacher**	Ferrari	5	16	
2004	(Germany) **Michael Schumacher**	Ferrari	8	18	
2005	(Spain) **Fernando Alonso**	Renault	6	19	
2006	(Spain) **Fernando Alonso**	Renault	6	18	
2007	(United Kingdom) Lewis Hamilton	McLaren-Mercedes	6	17	
2007	(Brazil) Felipe Massa	Ferrari	6	17	
2008	(United Kingdom) **Lewis Hamilton**	McLaren-Mercedes	7	18	
2009	(United Kingdom) **Jenson Button**	Brawn-Mercedes	4	17	
2009	(Germany) Sebastian Vettel	Red Bull-Renault	4	17	
2009	(United Kingdom) Lewis Hamilton	McLaren-Mercedes	4	17	
2010	(Germany) **Sebastian Vettel**	Red Bull-Renault	10	19	
2011	(Germany) **Sebastian Vettel**	Red Bull-Renault	15	19	
2012	(United Kingdom) Lewis Hamilton	McLaren-Mercedes	7	20	
2013	(Germany) **Sebastian Vettel**	Red Bull-Renault	9	19	
2014	(Germany) Nico Rosberg	Mercedes	11	19	
2015	(United Kingdom) **Lewis Hamilton**	Mercedes	11	19	
2016	(United Kingdom) Lewis Hamilton	Mercedes	12	21	
2017	(United Kingdom) **Lewis Hamilton**	Mercedes	11	20	
2018	(United Kingdom) **Lewis Hamilton**	Mercedes	11	21	
2019	(Monaco) Charles Leclerc	Ferrari	7	21	
2020	(United Kingdom) **Lewis Hamilton**	Mercedes	10	17	
2021	(Netherlands) **Max Verstappen**	Red Bull Racing-Honda	10	22	
2022	(Monaco) Charles Leclerc	Ferrari	9	22	
2023	(Netherlands) **Max Verstappen**	Red Bull Racing-Honda RBPT	12	22	
2024	(Netherlands) **Max Verstappen**	Red Bull Racing-Honda RBPT	8	24	
2024	(United Kingdom) Lando Norris	McLaren-Mercedes	8	24	
2025	(Netherlands) Max Verstappen	Red Bull Racing-Honda RBPT	8	24	
2026	(Italy) **Kimi Antonelli**	Mercedes	7*	21*	

* Season still in progress.

== Record progression ==
Record progression of most Formula One career pole positions
Driver	Win count	Achieved at
(Italy) Giuseppe Farina	1	1950 British Grand Prix
(Argentina) Juan Manuel Fangio	1	1950 Monaco Grand Prix
(United States) Walt Faulkner	1	1950 Indianapolis 500
(Argentina) Juan Manuel Fangio	2	1950 Swiss Grand Prix
(Italy) Giuseppe Farina	2	1950 Belgian Grand Prix
(Argentina) Juan Manuel Fangio	3–8	1950 French Grand Prix
(Italy) Alberto Ascari	8–9	1953 Argentine Grand Prix
(Argentina) Juan Manuel Fangio	9	1953 Belgian Grand Prix
(Italy) Alberto Ascari	10–13	1953 French Grand Prix
(Argentina) Juan Manuel Fangio	13–29	1954 British Grand Prix
(United Kingdom) Jim Clark	29–33	1967 German Grand Prix
(Brazil) Ayrton Senna	33–65	1989 Mexican Grand Prix
(Germany) Michael Schumacher	65–68	2006 Bahrain Grand Prix
(United Kingdom) Lewis Hamilton	68–105	2017 Belgian Grand Prix

== See also ==
- List of Formula One Grand Prix winners
- List of Formula One drivers who set a fastest lap
- List of Formula One sprint winners
- List of Formula One driver records

== Bibliography ==
- Hughes, Mark; Tremayne, David (2002). The Concise Encyclopedia of Formula 1. Parragon. ISBN 0-75258-766-8.
