= List of Formula One sprint winners =

Formula One, abbreviated to F1, is the highest class of open-wheeled auto racing defined by the Fédération Internationale de l'Automobile (FIA), motorsport's world governing body. The "formula" in the name refers to a set of rules to which all participants and vehicles must conform. The Formula One World Championship season consists of a series of races, known as Grands Prix, usually held on purpose-built circuits, and in a few cases on closed city streets. The results of each race are combined to determine two annual championships, one for drivers and one for constructors.

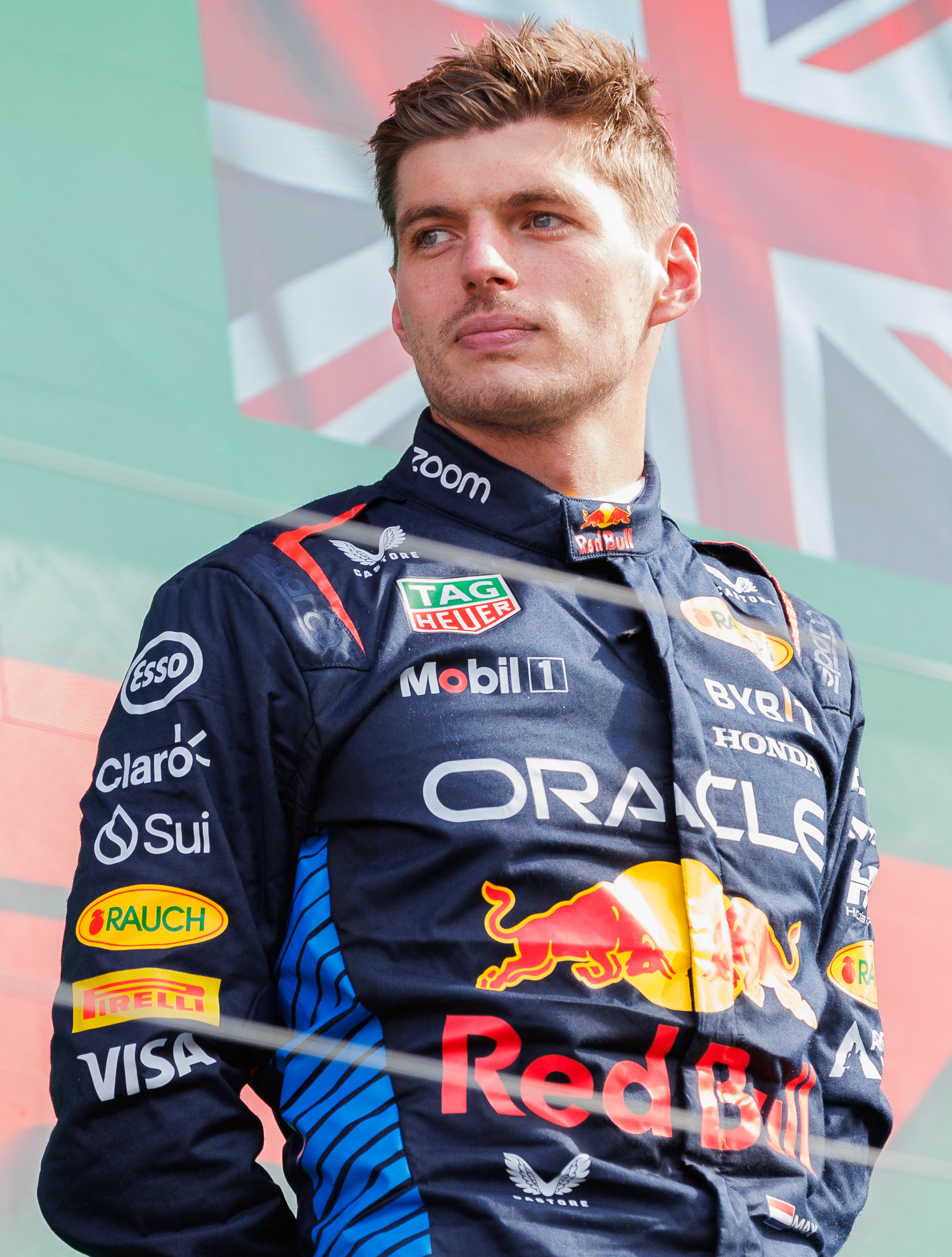
Max Verstappen holds the record for the most Formula One sprint wins with fourteen during his career.

Sprints were introduced at three Grands Prix in 2021. The 2022 season also had three sprints. In each of 2023–2026 seasons, six Grands Prix featured the sprint format. In 2027, a record 10 sprints are scheduled to take place.

Max Verstappen has won fourteen sprints, which is the record for the most sprint wins amongst drivers. Lando Norris and George Russell have won four sprints each. Eight different drivers have won at least one sprint. Verstappen was the winner of the first ever sprint at the 2021 British Grand Prix. Two other sprints in 2021 were won by Valtteri Bottas. Verstappen won more sprints than any other driver in 2022, 2023, and 2024 seasons. In 2025, Verstappen and Norris each won two sprints. In 2026, Russell won the most sprints, winning three times.

Red Bull Racing have won fifteen sprints, more than any other constructor. McLaren and Mercedes have seven sprint wins each. Ferrari won one sprint. The Netherlands has more wins than any other country, thanks to Verstappen's fourteen wins. The United Kingdom is in second place, with nine wins.

== By driver ==
Key
*	Driver has competed in the 2026 season
‡	Formula One World Champion
†	Has competed in the 2026 season and is a Formula One World Champion

Formula One sprint winners
Rank	Driver	Country	Sprint wins	Seasons active (Note: Sprints were introduced in the 2021 season.)	First sprint win	Last sprint win
1	Max Verstappen†	Netherlands	14	2015–	2021 British Grand Prix	2026 Singapore Grand Prix
2	Lando Norris†	United Kingdom	4	2019–	2024 São Paulo Grand Prix	2026 Miami Grand Prix
2	George Russell*	United Kingdom	4	2019–	2022 São Paulo Grand Prix	2026 Dutch Grand Prix
4	Oscar Piastri*	Australia	3	2023–	2023 Qatar Grand Prix	2025 Qatar Grand Prix
5	Valtteri Bottas*	Finland	2	2013–2024, 2026	2021 Italian Grand Prix	2021 São Paulo Grand Prix
6	Sergio Pérez*	Mexico	1	2011–2024, 2026	2023 Azerbaijan Grand Prix	2023 Azerbaijan Grand Prix
6	Lewis Hamilton†	United Kingdom	1	2007–	2025 Chinese Grand Prix	2025 Chinese Grand Prix
6	Kimi Antonelli†	Italy	1	2025–	2026 British Grand Prix	2026 British Grand Prix

== By nationality ==
Key
**Bold**	Driver has competed in the 2026 season

Rank	Country	Sprint wins	Driver(s)	No. of drivers
1	Netherlands	14	**Max Verstappen (14)**	1
2	United Kingdom	9	**Lando Norris (4)**, **George Russell (4)**, **Lewis Hamilton (1)**	3
3	Australia	3	**Oscar Piastri (3)**	1
4	Finland	2	**Valtteri Bottas (2)**	1
5	Mexico	1	**Sergio Pérez (1)**	1
5	Italy	1	**Kimi Antonelli (1)**	1

== By constructor ==
Rank	Constructor	Sprint wins	No. of drivers
1	(Austria) Red Bull Racing	15	2
2	(United Kingdom) McLaren	7	2
2	(Germany) Mercedes	7	3
4	(Italy) Ferrari	1	1

== Most wins per season ==
Key
	Driver has competed in the 2026 season
**Bold**	Won the World Championship in the same year

Highest number of sprint wins per season
Year	Driver(s)	Constructor(s)	Sprint wins	Sprints	Percentage
2021	(Finland) Valtteri Bottas	Mercedes	2	3	66.67%
2022	(Netherlands) **Max Verstappen**	Red Bull Racing-RBPT	2	3	66.67%
2023	(Netherlands) **Max Verstappen**	Red Bull Racing-Honda RBPT	4	6	66.67%
2024	(Netherlands) **Max Verstappen**	Red Bull Racing-Honda RBPT	4	6	66.67%
2025	(Netherlands) Max Verstappen	Red Bull Racing-Honda RBPT	2	6	33.33%
2025	(United Kingdom) **Lando Norris**	McLaren-Mercedes	2	6	33.33%
2026	(United Kingdom) George Russell	Mercedes	3	6	50.00%

== Sprint winners by race ==
Key
	Driver has competed in the 2026 season
**Bold**	Won the World Championship in the same year

Season	Grand Prix	Sprint winner	Constructor	R.
2021	(United Kingdom) British	(Netherlands) **Max Verstappen**	Red Bull Racing-Honda	
2021	(Italy) Italian	(Finland) Valtteri Bottas	Mercedes	
2021	(Brazil) São Paulo	(Finland) Valtteri Bottas	Mercedes	
2022	(Italy) Emilia Romagna	(Netherlands) **Max Verstappen**	Red Bull Racing-RBPT	
2022	(Austria) Austrian	(Netherlands) **Max Verstappen**	Red Bull Racing-RBPT	
2022	(Brazil) São Paulo	(United Kingdom) George Russell	Mercedes	
2023	Azerbaijan	(Mexico) Sergio Pérez	Red Bull Racing-Honda RBPT	
2023	(Austria) Austrian	(Netherlands) **Max Verstappen**	Red Bull Racing-Honda RBPT	
2023	(Belgium) Belgian	(Netherlands) **Max Verstappen**	Red Bull Racing-Honda RBPT	
2023	Qatar	(Australia) Oscar Piastri	McLaren-Mercedes	
2023	United States	(Netherlands) **Max Verstappen**	Red Bull Racing-Honda RBPT	
2023	(Brazil) São Paulo	(Netherlands) **Max Verstappen**	Red Bull Racing-Honda RBPT	
2024	(China) Chinese	(Netherlands) **Max Verstappen**	Red Bull Racing-Honda RBPT	
2024	(United States) Miami	(Netherlands) **Max Verstappen**	Red Bull Racing-Honda RBPT	
2024	(Austria) Austrian	(Netherlands) **Max Verstappen**	Red Bull Racing-Honda RBPT	
2024	United States	(Netherlands) **Max Verstappen**	Red Bull Racing-Honda RBPT	
2024	(Brazil) São Paulo	(United Kingdom) Lando Norris	McLaren-Mercedes	
2024	Qatar	(Australia) Oscar Piastri	McLaren-Mercedes	
2025	(China) Chinese	(United Kingdom) Lewis Hamilton	Ferrari	
2025	(United States) Miami	(United Kingdom) **Lando Norris**	McLaren-Mercedes	
2025	(Belgium) Belgian	(Netherlands) Max Verstappen	Red Bull Racing-Honda RBPT	
2025	United States	(Netherlands) Max Verstappen	Red Bull Racing-Honda RBPT	
2025	(Brazil) São Paulo	(United Kingdom) **Lando Norris**	McLaren-Mercedes	
2025	Qatar	(Australia) Oscar Piastri	McLaren-Mercedes	
2026	(China) Chinese	(United Kingdom) George Russell	Mercedes	
2026	(United States) Miami	(United Kingdom) Lando Norris	McLaren-Mercedes	
2026	(Canada) Canadian	(United Kingdom) George Russell	Mercedes	
2026	(United Kingdom) British	(Italy) **Kimi Antonelli**	Mercedes	
2026	(Netherlands) Dutch	(United Kingdom) George Russell	Mercedes	
2026	Singapore	(Netherlands) Max Verstappen	Red Bull Racing	

== See also ==
- List of Formula One Grand Prix winners
- List of Formula One polesitters
- List of Formula One drivers who set a fastest lap
- List of Formula One driver records
