= 2026 British Grand Prix =

Formula One motor race

Race 9 of 23 (Note: At the time of the event Formula One planned to hold twenty-two Grands Prix.) in the 2026 Formula One World Championship
← Previous race	Next race →
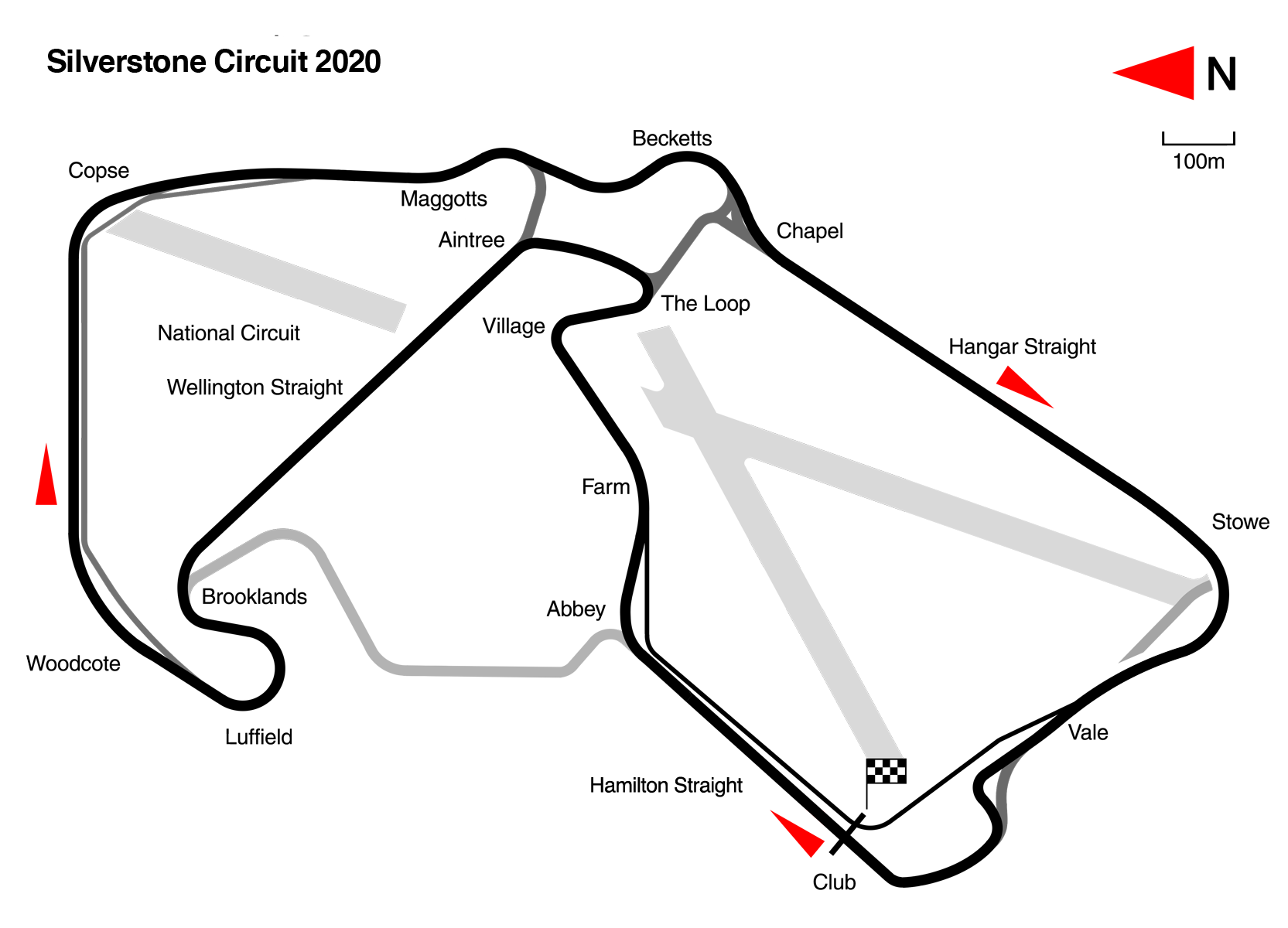
- Layout of the Silverstone Circuit

Race details
- Date: 5 July 2026
- Official name: Formula 1 Pirelli British Grand Prix 2026
- Location: Silverstone Circuit; Silverstone, United Kingdom
- Course: Permanent racing facility
- Course length: 5.891 km (3.660 miles)
- Distance: 52 laps, 306.198 km (190.263 miles)
- Weather: Sunny. Max. ambient temp. 26.4°C, max. track temp. 43.8°C.
- Attendance: 564,000

Pole position
Driver	(Italy) Kimi Antonelli	Mercedes
- Time: 1:28.111

Fastest lap
Driver	(Italy) Kimi Antonelli	Mercedes
- Time: 1:31.777 on lap 37

Podium
First	(Monaco) Charles Leclerc	Ferrari
Second	(United Kingdom) George Russell	Mercedes
Third	(United Kingdom) Lewis Hamilton	Ferrari

The 2026 British Grand Prix (officially known as the Formula 1 Pirelli British Grand Prix 2026) was a Formula One motor race that took place on 5 July 2026 at the Silverstone Circuit in Northamptonshire, England. It was the ninth round of the 2026 Formula One World Championship and the fourth of six Grands Prix in the season to utilise the sprint format.

Lewis Hamilton (Ferrari) took sprint pole position ahead of Kimi Antonelli (Mercedes), with Max Verstappen (Red Bull) qualifying third. Antonelli passed Hamilton to take his first sprint victory, while Lando Norris (McLaren) completed the podium. Later that day, Antonelli took pole position for the Grand Prix ahead of Charles Leclerc (Ferrari) and Hamilton.

Leclerc made a strong start to take the lead from Antonelli, while Hamilton also moved ahead of the Mercedes driver in the opening corners. Antonelli later passed Hamilton and appeared set to challenge Leclerc for victory after making his sole pit stop on fresher tyres, but a failure of his left-front wheel shield left him unable to turn the car normally and required two further pit stops. Verstappen's late retirement brought out the safety car, with the race ending under yellow flags.

Leclerc took his ninth Formula One victory, his first at the British Grand Prix and the 250th for Ferrari, ahead of George Russell (Mercedes), who took his first podium at Silverstone, and Hamilton. Antonelli crossed the line ninth but dropped to fifteenth after receiving a five-second time penalty for exceeding track limits. The event broke the record for the best attended Formula One event, with 564,000 people across the weekend.

== Background ==
The Silverstone Circuit in Northamptonshire hosted Formula One for the 61st time in the circuit's history, the circuit previously hosted the 70th Anniversary Grand Prix in 2020 and 59 editions of the British Grand Prix. It took place over the weekend of 3–5 July. The event attracted 564,000 spectators across the weekend, taking the record for the best attended Formula One Grand Prix.The event was the ninth round of the 2026 Formula One World Championship and the 77th running of the British Grand Prix as a round of the Formula One World Championship. It was also the fourth of six Grands Prix in the season to utilise the sprint format and the second time overall that the British Grand Prix featured it.

=== Championship standings before the race ===
Going into the weekend, Kimi Antonelli led the Drivers' Championship with 171 points, 40 points ahead of teammate George Russell in second, and 46 ahead of Lewis Hamilton in third. Mercedes, with 302 points, led the Constructors' Championship from Ferrari and McLaren, who were second and third with 204 and 159 points, respectively.

=== Entrants ===
The drivers and teams were the same as the season entry list with no additional stand-in drivers for the race.

=== Tyre choices ===
Tyre supplier Pirelli brought the C1, C2, and C3 tyre compounds (the three hardest in their range) designated hard, medium, and soft, respectively, for teams to use at the event.

== Practice ==
The sole free practice session was held on 3 July 2026, at 12:30 local time (UTC+1), and was topped by Lewis Hamilton (Ferrari) ahead of Kimi Antonelli (Mercedes) and Charles Leclerc (Ferrari).

== Sprint qualifying ==
Sprint qualifying was held on 3 July 2026, at 16:30 local time (UTC+1), and determined the starting grid order of the sprint.

=== Sprint qualifying report ===
Medium tyres were mandatory in the first two parts of sprint qualifying (SQ1 and SQ2), while the top ten drivers progressed to the final part (SQ3) in which soft tyres were mandated. Hamilton's advantage over teammate Charles Leclerc in practice had already drawn attention before sprint qualifying, despite Ferrari's pre-weekend concerns over its expected straight-line performance.

In the 12-minute SQ1 segment, the Cadillac drivers Sergio Pérez and Valtteri Bottas were the first drivers to leave the pit lane, with the leading teams waiting before beginning their timed laps. Hamilton set an early benchmark, but Isack Hadjar (Red Bull) then moved to the top, ahead of Hamilton, Oscar Piastri (McLaren), Leclerc, Kimi Antonelli (Mercedes) and Max Verstappen (Red Bull). Hamilton returned to the top late in the segment, ending SQ1 ahead of Leclerc, with Hadjar third, Piastri fourth, George Russell (Mercedes) fifth and Verstappen sixth. The closing laps produced a close battle around the elimination places: Oliver Bearman (Haas) temporarily moved himself into a position to progress, dropping the Williams pair into the bottom six, before both Sainz and Albon improved. Sainz secured the final place in SQ2, 0.010 seconds ahead of Bearman, while Albon also advanced. Esteban Ocon (Haas), Pérez, Bottas, Fernando Alonso (Aston Martin) and Lance Stroll (Aston Martin) were also eliminated.

SQ2 was again contested on medium tyres and began with Hülkenberg setting the first representative lap, before the Red Bull drivers of Verstappen and Hadjar briefly headed the order. Leclerc, Antonelli and Hamilton subsequently improved, with Hamilton leading the segment ahead of Antonelli and Leclerc. Antonelli reported a loss of energy deployment on his first run, while Russell remained under pressure after struggling to match Antonelli's pace. With less than 90 seconds remaining, late improvements by Lawson and Lindblad placed Russell close to the elimination zone; Russell then improved to seventh on his final attempt. Norris had sustained damage in SQ1 after striking a kerb, leaving him disadvantaged during the second segment; nevertheless, he progressed in tenth place, while Gasly was eliminated in eleventh. Lawson's final lap moved him into fourth, ahead of Piastri, Verstappen, Russell, Hadjar and Lindblad, with Norris completing the top ten. Gasly was followed by the Audi drivers Bortoleto and Hülkenberg, then Colapinto, Sainz and Albon, all of whom were eliminated.

The final 10-minute SQ3 segment was run on soft tyres and effectively became a one-lap shootout, as the remaining ten drivers waited in their garages until the closing minutes before entering the circuit together. McLaren used the interval to repair Norris's damaged car, while the leading teams prepared for a single decisive lap. Piastri was the first driver to set a representative lap, before Norris improved. Antonelli then moved to provisional sprint pole. Hamilton, who had been fastest in practice, SQ1 and SQ2, responded with a lap of 1:28.376 to secure pole position by 0.011 seconds. Verstappen qualified third ahead of Leclerc, while Russell took fifth after struggling for pace throughout the session. Norris and Piastri were sixth and seventh, followed by Hadjar, Lawson and Lindblad.

The pole was Hamilton's third in the sprint format and his first in either qualifying format since the previous season's Chinese sprint. He described Ferrari's pace as an unexpected result following the team's pre-weekend expectations and credited the team's continued work on the SF-26. Following the session, Albon and Lindblad were each issued a warning by the stewards for separate breaches of the race director's instructions during sprint qualifying.

=== Sprint qualifying classification ===
Pos.	No.	Driver	Constructor	Qualifying times			Sprint grid
Pos.	No.	Driver	Constructor	SQ1	SQ2	SQ3	Sprint grid
1	44	(United Kingdom) Lewis Hamilton	Ferrari	1:29.273	1:28.747	1:28.376	1
2	12	(Italy) Kimi Antonelli	Mercedes	1:29.746	1:28.846	1:28.387	2
3	3	(Netherlands) Max Verstappen	Red Bull Racing-Red Bull Ford	1:29.689	1:29.242	1:28.697	3
4	16	(Monaco) Charles Leclerc	Ferrari	1:29.380	1:28.922	1:28.703	4
5	63	(United Kingdom) George Russell	Mercedes	1:29.675	1:29.246	1:28.733	5
6	1	(United Kingdom) Lando Norris	McLaren-Mercedes	1:30.142	1:29.401	1:28.740	6
7	81	(Australia) Oscar Piastri	McLaren-Mercedes	1:29.583	1:29.120	1:28.772	7
8	6	(France) Isack Hadjar	Red Bull Racing-Red Bull Ford	1:29.470	1:29.280	1:28.835	8
9	30	(New Zealand) Liam Lawson	Racing Bulls-Red Bull Ford	1:29.850	1:29.067	1:28.927	9
10	41	(United Kingdom) Arvid Lindblad	Racing Bulls-Red Bull Ford	1:30.453	1:29.330	1:29.367	10
11	10	(France) Pierre Gasly	Alpine-Mercedes	1:30.444	1:29.482	N/A	11
12	5	(Brazil) Gabriel Bortoleto	Audi	1:30.407	1:29.679	N/A	12
13	27	(Germany) Nico Hülkenberg	Audi	1:30.107	1:29.707	N/A	13
14	43	(Argentina) Franco Colapinto	Alpine-Mercedes	1:30.894	1:29.983	N/A	14
15	55	(Spain) Carlos Sainz Jr.	Atlassian Williams-Mercedes	1:31.073	1:30.197	N/A	15
16	23	(Thailand) Alexander Albon	Atlassian Williams-Mercedes	1:30.779	1:30.650	N/A	PL^{a}
17	87	(United Kingdom) Oliver Bearman	Haas-Ferrari	1:31.083	N/A	N/A	16
18	31	(France) Esteban Ocon	Haas-Ferrari	1:31.714	N/A	N/A	17
19	11	(Mexico) Sergio Pérez	Cadillac-Ferrari	1:31.776	N/A	N/A	18
20	77	(Finland) Valtteri Bottas	Cadillac-Ferrari	1:32.020	N/A	N/A	19
21	14	(Spain) Fernando Alonso	Aston Martin Aramco-Honda	1:32.910	N/A	N/A	20
22	18	(Canada) Lance Stroll	Aston Martin Aramco-Honda	1:32.988	N/A	N/A	21
107% time: 1:35.522

Notes

- ^a – Alexander Albon qualified 16th, but was required to start the sprint from the pit lane as his car was modified during parc fermé conditions.

== Sprint ==
The sprint was held on 4 July 2026, at 12:00 local time (UTC+1), and was run for 17 laps.

=== Sprint report ===
The 17-lap sprint followed a sprint qualifying session in which Lewis Hamilton (Ferrari) had taken pole position from Kimi Antonelli (Mercedes), with Max Verstappen (Red Bull) third on the grid. Alexander Albon (Williams) was required to start from the pit lane after the suspension set up of his car was changed under parc fermé conditions. The remaining drivers lined-up on a dry Silverstone circuit, with most selecting the medium compound tyres for the sprint; Valtteri Bottas (Cadillac) and the Aston Martin pair of Fernando Alonso and Lance Stroll started on soft tyres.

At the start, Hamilton defended the inside line into Abbey as Antonelli attempted to challenge for the lead. Behind them, the McLaren drivers Lando Norris and Oscar Piastri made strong getaways, while Verstappen dropped from third to sixth. Norris briefly passed Antonelli for second place, before Antonelli reclaimed the position on the Hangar Straight; George Russell (Mercedes) also briefly moved ahead of Norris. Verstappen subsequently overtook Russell to move back into fourth, while Charles Leclerc (Ferrari) passed Piastri for sixth. Yellow flags were shown during the opening lap after Alonso was spun around following contact with Sergio Pérez (Cadillac). Pérez pitted for a replacement front wing and was later given a ten-second time penalty for causing the collision.

Hamilton initially built a small advantage over Antonelli as the two broke clear of the group contesting third place. By the middle phase of the sprint, however, Antonelli had begun to close rapidly and the contest developed into an energy-management battle. Antonelli made several attempts to draw alongside Hamilton before the decisive sequence on lap eight: Hamilton used his battery deployment to repel an initial attack, but Antonelli remained within overtake range and used his remaining energy to pass on the Hangar Straight into Stowe. Antonelli gradually extended his advantage after taking the lead, while Hamilton was unable to mount a sustained response.

Behind the leaders, Russell overtook Verstappen for fourth at Stowe on lap ten. Verstappen's attempt to immediately regain the position allowed Leclerc to close in, and the Ferrari driver subsequently passed the Red Bull for fifth. Norris, having started sixth, remained ahead of the group and resisted Russell's late pressure to retain third place. Piastri finished seventh after losing ground in the early exchanges, while Liam Lawson (Racing Bulls) held off Red Bull's Isack Hadjar for the final point in eighth. The battle between Lawson and Hadjar continued until the final lap, with Lawson investigated after the sprint for moving under braking during his defensive manoeuvres.

Antonelli took the chequered flag ahead of Hamilton to secure the first sprint victory of his Formula One career, with Norris completing the podium. Antonelli set the fastest lap on the final tour. The result made Antonelli the youngest sprint winner in Formula One and extended his championship lead over Russell to 43 points. The sprint was widely viewed as evidence of Mercedes' stronger race pace and energy deployment at Silverstone, despite Hamilton's pole position for Ferrari.

=== Sprint classification ===
Pos.	No.	Driver	Constructor	Laps	Time/Retired	Grid	Points
1	12	(Italy) Kimi Antonelli	Mercedes	17	26:12.129	2	8
2	44	(United Kingdom) Lewis Hamilton	Ferrari	17	+2.745	1	7
3	1	(United Kingdom) Lando Norris	McLaren-Mercedes	17	+9.783	6	6
4	63	(United Kingdom) George Russell	Mercedes	17	+10.639	5	5
5	16	(Monaco) Charles Leclerc	Ferrari	17	+12.620	4	4
6	3	(Netherlands) Max Verstappen	Red Bull Racing-Red Bull Ford	17	+16.550	3	3
7	81	(Australia) Oscar Piastri	McLaren-Mercedes	17	+17.551	7	2
8	30	(New Zealand) Liam Lawson	Racing Bulls-Red Bull Ford	17	+30.233	9	1
9	6	(France) Isack Hadjar	Red Bull Racing-Red Bull Ford	17	+30.953	8	
10	41	(United Kingdom) Arvid Lindblad	Racing Bulls-Red Bull Ford	17	+35.110	10	
11	10	(France) Pierre Gasly	Alpine-Mercedes	17	+40.273	11	
12	43	(Argentina) Franco Colapinto	Alpine-Mercedes	17	+41.026	14	
13	5	(Brazil) Gabriel Bortoleto	Audi	17	+42.499	12	
14	87	(United Kingdom) Oliver Bearman	Haas-Ferrari	17	+45.784	16	
15	27	(Germany) Nico Hülkenberg	Audi	17	+46.680^{a}	13	
16	31	(France) Esteban Ocon	Haas-Ferrari	17	+49.810	17	
17	55	(Spain) Carlos Sainz Jr.	Atlassian Williams-Mercedes	17	+50.379	15	
18	23	(Thailand) Alexander Albon	Atlassian Williams-Mercedes	17	+50.757	PL	
19	77	(Finland) Valtteri Bottas	Cadillac-Ferrari	17	+1:15.117	19	
20	14	(Spain) Fernando Alonso	Aston Martin Aramco-Honda	17	+1:31.872	20	
21	18	(Canada) Lance Stroll	Aston Martin Aramco-Honda	16	+1 lap	21	
22	11	(Mexico) Sergio Pérez	Cadillac-Ferrari	16	+1 lap^{b}	18	

Notes

- ^a – Nico Hülkenberg finished 13th on track, but received a post-sprint five-second time penalty for leaving the track a gaining an advantage.
- ^b – Sergio Pérez received a ten-second time penalty for causing a collision with Fernando Alonso. The penalty made no difference as he was classified in the last position.

== Qualifying ==
Qualifying was held on 4 July 2026, at 16:00 local time (UTC+1), and determined the starting grid order for the main race.

=== Qualifying report ===
Qualifying took place in dry conditions at the Silverstone Circuit, a few hours after the sprint race. The session would determine the grid for the main race, with Mercedes aiming to maintain its unbeaten record in Grand Prix qualifying during the 2026 season, while Ferrari sought to build on Lewis Hamilton's sprint pole position from the previous day. In the first part of qualifying (Q1), most drivers ran the soft compound tyres while the Audi pair of Gabriel Bortoleto and Nico Hülkenberg began on mediums. Carlos Sainz Jr. (Williams) locked up in the windy conditions during the opening runs, while the Ferrari drivers Charles Leclerc and Hamilton were the first frontrunners to set representative times, with Leclerc leading Hamilton. George Russell (Mercedes) then ran through the gravel at Luffield after locking up and made light contact with the barriers, damaging his front wing. Russell was able to return to the pits and rejoined the session following repairs, eventually progressing to Q2 (the second part of qualifying). The final Q1 runs were interrupted when Franco Colapinto (Alpine) went off at Becketts, producing yellow flags. Isack Hadjar (Red Bull) set the fastest time of Q1, ahead of teammate Max Verstappen (Red Bull), while Liam Lawson (Racing Bulls) and Arvid Lindblad (Racing Bulls) both progressed. The eliminated drivers were Esteban Ocon (Haas), Valtteri Bottas (Cadillac), Colapinto, Sergio Pérez (Cadillac), and both Aston Martin drivers Lance Stroll and Fernando Alonso. Pérez had a lap deleted and subsequently reinstated for track limits, but remained twentieth.

Q2 was delayed while marshals cleared gravel from the circuit following Colapinto's excursion. Hadjar and Verstappen were the first drivers to begin their runs, with Verstappen reporting that his engine was not responding normally. Hamilton initially set the fastest lap, ahead of Leclerc and Russell, while Kimi Antonelli (Mercedes) had his first effort deleted for exceeding track limits. Antonelli recovered on his next attempt and later set the fastest Q2 lap. The McLaren drivers Lando Norris and Oscar Piastri (McLaren) both faced a difficult Q2, with Norris ninth and Piastri seventh. Bortoleto narrowly missed out of the final part of qualifying (Q3) and was eliminated in eleventh, ahead of Pierre Gasly (Alpine), Hülkenberg, Oliver Bearman (Haas), Sainz and Alexander Albon (Williams). Bortoleto's performance placed him more than half a second clear of the next midfield driver, while the Williams pair again failed to progress beyond Q2.

In Q3, Piastri was among the first drivers to set a lap, while Lindblad remained in the garage during the opening runs to preserve his available tyres for a single decisive attempt. Hamilton initially moved to the top of the timesheets, before Antonelli set the provisional pole lap. Russell followed in second place behind his Mercedes teammate, while Hamilton was third, Leclerc fourth and Hadjar headed the Red Bull drivers in fifth. Antonelli was the first driver to begin the final runs, questioning the strategy over team radio, but improved in the middle and final sectors. Leclerc also improved, taking second position behind Antonelli, while Hamilton remained third and Russell was unable to improve on his final attempt, falling to fourth. Mercedes had arrived at Silverstone having used an unusual but legal power-unit deployment technique in qualifying that was reported to have contributed to Antonelli's pole position; customer team McLaren did not yet have access to the same approach.

Following qualifying, Gasly received a three-place grid penalty for unnecessarily impeding Stroll during Q1. Gasly had been travelling slowly on the racing line into turn 15 while Stroll was on a timed lap, forcing Stroll to take avoiding action. The penalty dropped Gasly from twelfth to fifteenth on the grid, promoting Hülkenberg, Bearman and Sainz by one position. Antonelli's lap secured his fifth pole position of the season and extended Mercedes' streak of taking pole position at all nine Grands Prix held in 2026.

=== Qualifying classification ===
Pos.	No.	Driver	Constructor	Qualifying times			Final grid
Pos.	No.	Driver	Constructor	Q1	Q2	Q3	Final grid
1	12	(Italy) Kimi Antonelli	Mercedes	1:29.719	1:28.493	1:28.111	1
2	16	(Monaco) Charles Leclerc	Ferrari	1:29.534	1:28.626	1:28.286	2
3	44	(United Kingdom) Lewis Hamilton	Ferrari	1:29.644	1:28.864	1:28.458	3
4	63	(United Kingdom) George Russell	Mercedes	1:29.985	1:28.920	1:28.481	4
5	6	(France) Isack Hadjar	Red Bull Racing-Red Bull Ford	1:29.276	1:29.069	1:28.746	5
6	1	(United Kingdom) Lando Norris	McLaren-Mercedes	1:30.186	1:29.383	1:28.877	6
7	3	(Netherlands) Max Verstappen	Red Bull Racing-Red Bull Ford	1:29.549	1:29.113	1:28.893	7
8	81	(Australia) Oscar Piastri	McLaren-Mercedes	1:29.971	1:29.218	1:29.032	8
9	41	(United Kingdom) Arvid Lindblad	Racing Bulls-Red Bull Ford	1:29.661	1:29.324	1:29.305	9
10	30	(New Zealand) Liam Lawson	Racing Bulls-Red Bull Ford	1:29.300	1:29.429	1:29.716	10
11	5	(Brazil) Gabriel Bortoleto	Audi	1:30.269	1:29.461	N/A	11
12	10	(France) Pierre Gasly	Alpine-Mercedes	1:30.345	1:30.063	N/A	15^{a}
13	27	(Germany) Nico Hülkenberg	Audi	1:29.539	1:30.076	N/A	12
14	87	(United Kingdom) Oliver Bearman	Haas-Ferrari	1:30.570	1:30.501	N/A	13
15	55	(Spain) Carlos Sainz Jr.	Atlassian Williams-Mercedes	1:30.562	1:30.623	N/A	14
16	23	(Thailand) Alexander Albon	Atlassian Williams-Mercedes	1:30.638	1:31.341	N/A	16
17	31	(France) Esteban Ocon	Haas-Ferrari	1:30.680	N/A	N/A	17
18	77	(Finland) Valtteri Bottas	Cadillac-Ferrari	1:31.227	N/A	N/A	18
19	43	(Argentina) Franco Colapinto	Alpine-Mercedes	1:31.321	N/A	N/A	19
20	11	(Mexico) Sergio Pérez	Cadillac-Ferrari	1:31.451	N/A	N/A	20
21	18	(Canada) Lance Stroll	Aston Martin Aramco-Honda	1:32.863	N/A	N/A	22^{b}
22	14	(Spain) Fernando Alonso	Aston Martin Aramco-Honda	1:33.025	N/A	N/A	21
107% time: 1:35.525

Notes

- ^a – Pierre Gasly received a three-place grid penalty for impeding Lance Stroll in Q1.
- ^b – Lance Stroll received a ten-place grid penalty for exceeding his quota of power unit elements.

== Race ==
The race was held on 5 July 2026, at 15:00 local time (UTC+1), and was run for 52 laps.

=== Race report ===
The race took place in warm and dry conditions at the Silverstone Circuit, with Pirelli expecting the 52-lap event to be a one-stop race for most of the field. All 22 drivers initially selected medium tyres, although Fernando Alonso (Aston Martin) stopped briefly during the formation lap and started from the pit lane.

Leclerc made the better start moved into the lead, while Hamilton also passed Antonelli to give Ferrari the leading two positions through the opening corners. Russell retained fourth ahead of Isack Hadjar (Red Bull), while the latter's teammate Max Verstappen gained a position to move into sixth. Further back, Oscar Piastri (McLaren) sustained front-wing damage after contact with Liam Lawson (Racing Bulls) at Brooklands and pitted at the end of the opening lap; he ended up circulating outside the points for the rest of the race. Alexander Albon (Williams) also damaged his car after making contact with Oliver Bearman (Haas), spinning the Haas driver at turn 6; Albon received a ten-second time penalty for causing the collision and later retired after Williams kept him circulating to gather data.

Hamilton was noted for a potential false start and subsequently received a five-second time penalty. At the front, Leclerc steadily extended his advantage while Hamilton reported front-left tyre graining and Antonelli closed on him. Antonelli passed Hamilton on the inside at Copse on lap 11, moving into second place and beginning his pursuit of Leclerc, who was approximately four seconds ahead. Russell reported unusual downshifts from his gearbox, while Verstappen complained about the deployment and downshift behaviour of his Red Bull as he closed on the Mercedes ahead. Verstappen overtook Russell for fourth place on lap 17 before making an early stop for hard tyres, rejoining in seventh. A brief virtual safety car period followed on lap 22 to allow a marshall to recover an umbrella from beside the circuit. Esteban Ocon (Haas) and Sergio Pérez (Cadillac) were able to pit during the interruption, while the other leading drivers remained on circuit. Hamilton made his first stop shortly afterwards, serving his five-second penalty and rejoining behind Russell. Leclerc stopped at the end of lap 25 for hard tyres, relinquishing the lead to Antonelli, who remained on his original medium tyres to build an advantage in tyre age for the final stint.

The middle phase of the race featured a sustained battle between Hamilton and Russell for third. Hamilton attacked Russell around the outside at Copse and later at Brooklands, Russell repeatedly regained the position using superior energy deployment on the following straights. Russell was then informed that he had a slow right-rear puncture and pitted on lap 35. Antonelli made his first stop a lap later, fitting hard tyres and rejoining behind Leclerc with tyres approximately ten laps fresher. Hamilton passed Verstappen on the Wellington Straight on lap 38 to move into third place. On lap 39, Nico Hülkenberg (Audi) stopped at the side of the circuit with a hydraulic problem, causing a second virtual safety car period. Verstappen, Lando Norris (McLaren) and Hadjar made their final stops during the interruption. Antonelli quickly reduced Leclerc's advantage after the restart and had brought the gap down to just over three seconds when he reported a problem with his car on lap 41. Mercedes initially changed the front wing and tyres, but later identified the problem as a broken left-front wheel shield. The wheel shield was broken when Antonelli took a kerb at Copse aggressively. Antonelli made a second stop to remove the damaged bodywork and returned to the circuit in tenth place, struggling with the handling of the car. He received a five-second penalty for exceeding track limits, which later dropped him from ninth on the road to sixteenth after crossing the line.

With Antonelli no longer challenging for the lead, Leclerc built an advantage of approximately 20 seconds over Hamilton. The race was transformed again on lap 48 when Verstappen lost the rear of his car at Stowe and became stranded in the gravel, bringing out the safety car. Leclerc and Hamilton both pitted for fresh soft tyres, while Russell remained on circuit on used medium tyres and moved ahead of Hamilton into second place. Race control initially indicated that the safety car would enter the pit lane to permit a final-lap restart, but the restart was cancelled after a software error. As the message permitting lapped cars to overtake had already been issued, the regulations required the safety car to return to the pits only at the end of the following lap, making a restart before the chequered flag impossible. The field therefore remained behind the safety car until the finish, with Leclerc taking the chequered flag to secure victory ahead of Russell and Hamilton.

Norris finished fourth, ahead of Hadjar in fifth. Lawson and Arvid Lindblad completed a double points finish for Racing Bulls in sixth and seventh, while Gabriel Bortoleto (Audi) took eighth, tripling Audi's points total for the season to that point. Nineteenth-placed Franco Colapinto (Alpine) recovered from a half-spin at Club on the opening lap to finish ninth, with Gasly completing the points positions in tenth after a slow first pit stop. Piastri recovered from his early front-wing change to finish eleventh.

==== Post-race and championship impact ====
Leclerc's victory was the ninth of his Formula One career, his first at Silverstone and his first since the 2024 United States Grand Prix. The result also gave Ferrari its 250th Formula One World Championship race victory. Antonelli retained the lead of the Drivers' Championship on 179 points, Russell reduced the gap to 25 points by moving to 154. Hamilton remained third on 147 points, ahead of Leclerc on 108 and Norris on 97.

Hamilton's third-place result was confirmed following a post-race investigation into an alleged yellow-flag infringement. The stewards found that he had failed to slow sufficiently for a single yellow flag at turn 9 on lap 38, but issued only a reprimand, his first of the season. They took into account that Hamilton had entered the sector before the yellow indication was displayed, had limited time to react to it, and had been anticipating a counter-attack from Max Verstappen after their preceding battle. He therefore retained third place in the final classification.

Carlos Sainz was later given a one-lap penalty after incorrectly unlapping himself during the late safety car period. Although he had been a lap down before entering the pit lane, Silverstone's pit-entry configuration meant that he had temporarily become unlapped by the relevant timing line and was therefore not eligible to overtake the safety car. As he was not included in the Race Control message identifying the drivers permitted to unlap themselves, the stewards imposed the penalty, demoting him from twelfth to seventeenth.

=== Race classification ===
Pos.	No.	Driver	Constructor	Laps	Time/Retired	Grid	Points
1	16	(Monaco) Charles Leclerc	Ferrari	52	1:27:11.335	2	25
2	63	(United Kingdom) George Russell	Mercedes	52	+0.427	4	18
3	44	(United Kingdom) Lewis Hamilton	Ferrari	52	+0.772	3	15
4	1	(United Kingdom) Lando Norris	McLaren-Mercedes	52	+1.149	6	12
5	6	(France) Isack Hadjar	Red Bull Racing-Red Bull Ford	52	+1.598	5	10
6	30	(New Zealand) Liam Lawson	Racing Bulls-Red Bull Ford	52	+2.023	10	8
7	41	(United Kingdom) Arvid Lindblad	Racing Bulls-Red Bull Ford	52	+2.214	9	6
8	5	(Brazil) Gabriel Bortoleto	Audi	52	+2.413	11	4
9	43	(Argentina) Franco Colapinto	Alpine-Mercedes	52	+3.229	19	2
10	10	(France) Pierre Gasly	Alpine-Mercedes	52	+3.445	15	1
11	81	(Australia) Oscar Piastri	McLaren-Mercedes	52	+4.014	8	
12	87	(United Kingdom) Oliver Bearman	Haas-Ferrari	52	+5.245	13	
13	31	(France) Esteban Ocon	Haas-Ferrari	52	+5.512	17	
14	11	(Mexico) Sergio Pérez	Cadillac-Ferrari	52	+7.403	20	
15	12	(Italy) Kimi Antonelli	Mercedes	52	+8.005^{a}	1	
16	77	(Finland) Valtteri Bottas	Cadillac-Ferrari	52	+8.162	18	
17	55	(Spain) Carlos Sainz Jr.	Atlassian Williams-Mercedes	51	+1 lap^{b}	14	
18	14	(Spain) Fernando Alonso	Aston Martin Aramco-Honda	51	+1 lap	PL^{c}	
19	18	(Canada) Lance Stroll	Aston Martin Aramco-Honda	51	+1 lap	22	
20^{d}	3	(Netherlands) Max Verstappen	Red Bull Racing-Red Bull Ford	46	Spun off	7	
Ret	23	(Thailand) Alexander Albon	Atlassian Williams-Mercedes	43	Collision Damage	16	
Ret	27	(Germany) Nico Hülkenberg	Audi	36	Gearbox	12	

Notes

- ^a – Kimi Antonelli finished ninth, but received a five-second time penalty for exceeding track limits. He was originally classified in 16th, but gained a position following Carlos Sainz Jr.'s penalty.
- ^b – Carlos Sainz Jr. finished twelfth on track, but received a post-race one penalty lap for overtaking the safety car.
- ^c – Fernando Alonso started the race from the pit lane following an issue on his car during the formation lap. His place on the grid was left vacant.
- ^d – Max Verstappen was classified as he completed more than 90% of the race distance.

== Championship standings after the race ==
Drivers' Championship standings

	Pos.	Driver	Points
	1	(Italy) Kimi Antonelli	179
	2	(United Kingdom) George Russell	154
	3	(United Kingdom) Lewis Hamilton	147
2	4	(Monaco) Charles Leclerc	108
	5	(United Kingdom) Lando Norris	97

Constructors' Championship standings

Pos.	Constructor	Points
1	(Germany) Mercedes	333
2	(Italy) Ferrari	255
3	(United Kingdom) McLaren-Mercedes	181
4	(Austria) Red Bull Racing-Red Bull Ford	131
5	(Italy) Racing Bulls-Red Bull Ford	63

- Note: Only the top five positions are included for both sets of standings.

== See also ==
- 2026 Silverstone Formula 2 round
- 2026 Silverstone Formula 3 round

== Notes ==
Previous race: 2026 Austrian Grand Prix	FIA Formula One World Championship; 2026 season	Next race: 2026 Belgian Grand Prix
Previous race: 2025 British Grand Prix	British Grand Prix	Next race: 2027 British Grand Prix
