= 2023 British Grand Prix =

Formula One motor race

Race 10 of 22 in the 2023 Formula One World Championship
← Previous race	Next race →
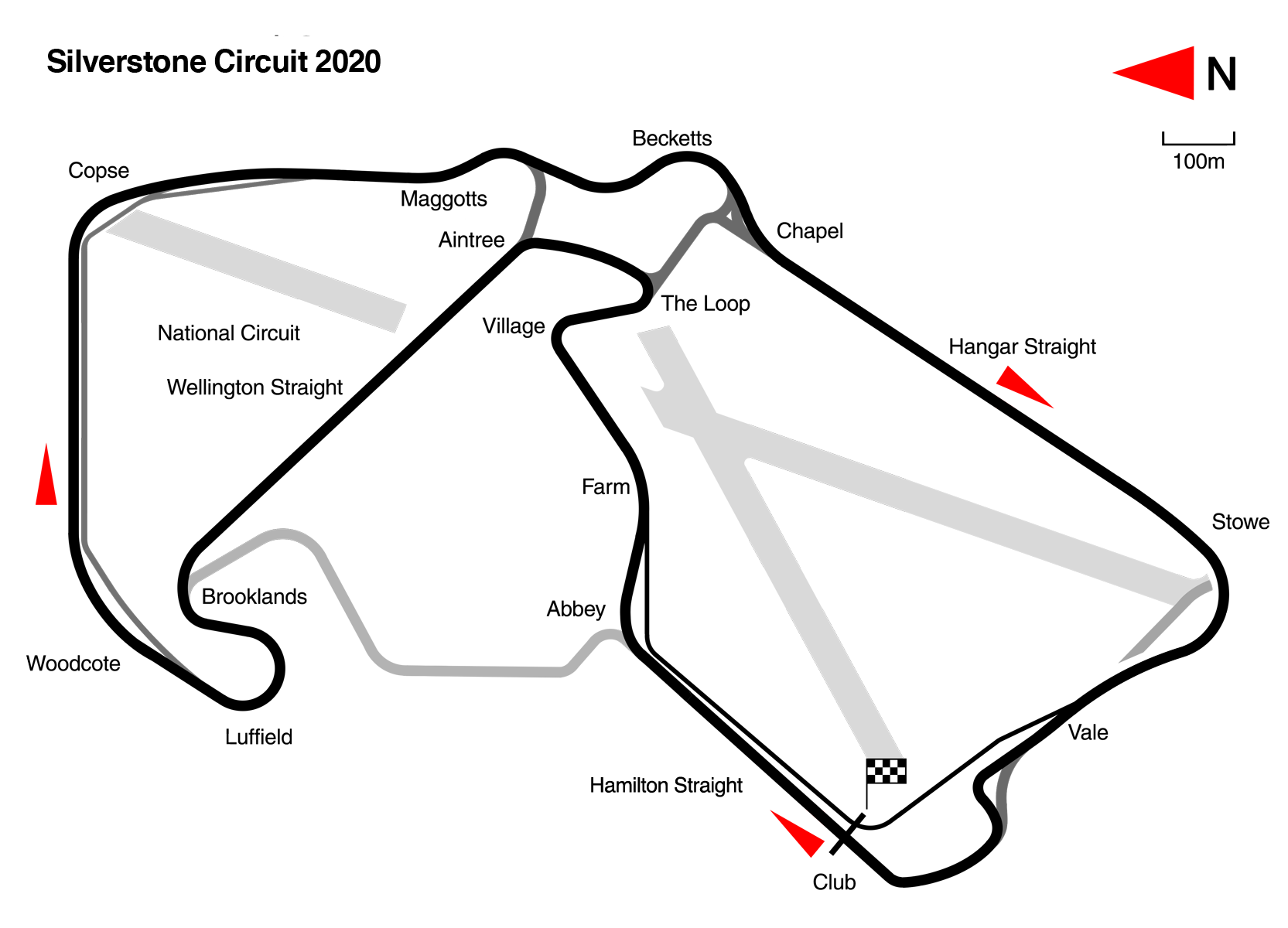
- Layout of the Silverstone Circuit

Race details
- Date: 9 July 2023
- Official name: Formula 1 Aramco British Grand Prix 2023
- Location: Silverstone Circuit; Silverstone, United Kingdom
- Course: Permanent racing facility
- Course length: 5.891 km (3.660 miles)
- Distance: 52 laps, 306.198 km (190.263 miles)
- Weather: Partly cloudy
- Attendance: 480,000

Pole position
Driver	(Netherlands) Max Verstappen	Red Bull Racing-Honda RBPT
- Time: 1:26.720

Fastest lap
Driver	(Netherlands) Max Verstappen	Red Bull Racing-Honda RBPT
- Time: 1:30.275 on lap 42

Podium
First	(Netherlands) Max Verstappen	Red Bull Racing-Honda RBPT
Second	(United Kingdom) Lando Norris	McLaren-Mercedes
Third	(United Kingdom) Lewis Hamilton	Mercedes

The 2023 British Grand Prix (officially known as the Formula 1 Aramco British Grand Prix 2023) was a Formula One motor race that was held on 9 July 2023 at the Silverstone Circuit in Northamptonshire, England. It was the tenth round of the 2023 Formula One World Championship.

The race, which saw a record 480,000 people attend throughout the weekend, was won by polesitter Max Verstappen ahead of the McLaren of Lando Norris and Mercedes's Lewis Hamilton, it was Verstappen's first win as the British Grand Prix and his second win in Silverstone after the 2020 70th Anniversary Grand Prix, and Red Bull's first win in the British Grand Prix since 2012. This race also marked the last Grand Prix start to date of Dutch driver Nyck de Vries who was replaced at Scuderia AlphaTauri by Daniel Ricciardo from the next race at the Hungarian Grand Prix onwards.

== Background ==
The event was held across the weekend of 7–9 July. It was the tenth round of the 2023 Formula One World Championship and the 74th running of the British Grand Prix.

=== Championship standings before the race ===
Coming into the weekend, Max Verstappen led the Drivers' Championship by 81 points from teammate Sergio Pérez, with Fernando Alonso third, a further 17 points behind. Red Bull Racing led the Constructors' Championship, leading Mercedes by 199 points and Aston Martin by 202 points.

=== Entrants ===
The drivers and teams were the same as the season entry list with no additional stand-in drivers for the race.

This Grand Prix was the last for Nyck de Vries, who was removed from his AlphaTauri seat two days after the race. De Vries was replaced by Daniel Ricciardo, who was the third driver for AlphaTauri's sister team Red Bull Racing, from the Hungarian Grand Prix onward.

=== Tyre choices ===
Tyre supplier Pirelli brought the C1, C2 and C3 tyre compounds (designated hard, medium, and soft, respectively) for teams to use at the event.

=== Filming ===
The Grand Prix was used as a filming location for F1. Pitt's run around Silverstone in a Formula 2 car would be inserted into racing scenes filmed from the race.

== Practice ==
Three free practice sessions were held for the event. Two one-hour sessions on 7 July and a one-hour practice session on 8 July, two hours before qualifying. The first session ended with Max Verstappen fastest ahead of Red Bull Racing teammate Sergio Pérez and Williams driver Alexander Albon. The second session ended with Verstappen fastest ahead of Ferrari's Carlos Sainz Jr. and Albon. The third session ended with Charles Leclerc fastest, driving for Ferrari, ahead of Albon and Aston Martin driver Fernando Alonso.

== Qualifying ==
Qualifying was held on 8 July 2023, at 15:00 local time (UTC+1).

=== Qualifying report ===
Qualifying was held under cloudy skies, with a small patch of rain during the closing moments the first segment of qualifying, Q1.

On his first qualifying lap, Lewis Hamilton spun at Stowe corner, sending him into the gravel and bringing out a brief yellow flag; he was able to recover back onto track. Following his spin, Hamilton looked at risk to face another Q1 elimination, but improved his time significantly. Max Verstappen and Alexander Albon both had lap times deleted for track limits violations. After the Haas of Kevin Magnussen broke down between the Stowe and Vale corners, a red-flag was shown with three-minutes to go in Q1 to allows it recovery. Albon was in the elimination zone as he had his lap times deleted again while Logan Sargeant ended up in the grass; following the restart, Albon would set a time for Q2 going seventh fastest. Meanwhile, Nyck de Vries was released onto the path of Oscar Piastri with no investigation being made. When pulling out of the garage to resume qualifying after the red flag, Verstappen understeered and hit the pit wall, breaking his front wing, which had to be replaced.

When the session resumed, Sergio Pérez set the first time and topped the session, though other drivers improved with faster times, resulting in him being eliminated in Q1. This continued a streak of poor qualifying performances in which he failed to make Q3 (the third segment) on five consecutive occasions, with his teammate Verstappen securing pole in those races. The Alfa Romeo of Valtteri Bottas broke down at the end of Q1; despite setting a time for Q2, he was unable to run in the rest of qualifying. Magnussen joined Pérez, Yuki Tsunoda, Zhou, and De Vries in being eliminated, with Lando Norris topping the session ahead of Charles Leclerc, George Russell, Hamilton, and Verstappen.

The second session (Q2) was delayed to allow the recovery of Bottas's car and saw the rain dissipate. As the session began, Lance Stroll and Sargeant's laps were deleted due to more track limits violations. Norris topped the session momentarily before Fernando Alonso, Albon, Leclerc and Sainz set faster times. Pierre Gasly, Piastri, Hamilton and Norris all set the fastest lap, with Verstappen securing fastest lap by session's end ahead of Piastri, Norris, Albon and Sainz. Bottas, who could not run any laps, joined Stroll, Ocon, Nico Hülkenberg, and Sargeant all out of qualifying in Q2.

With no threat of rain over the last ten minutes of qualifying, DRS was enabled. Verstappen took provisional pole after the initial laps, ahead of Hamilton and Piastri, before everyone pitted for new tyres. The drivers' second laps in Q3 saw Verstappen maintain his pole position with Norris and Piastri taking second and third respectively in McLaren's highest qualifying result of the season. Norris and Piastri were astonished by their respective performances during the session; Piastri said that it was a "massive step in the right direction" for the team.

=== Post-qualifying ===
Bottas was subsequently disqualified during post-qualification scrutineering due to insufficient fuel sample; he was allowed to start the race under stewards' discretion, though he was sent to last place.

=== Qualifying classification ===
Pos.	No.	Driver	Constructor	Qualifying times			Final grid
Pos.	No.	Driver	Constructor	Q1	Q2	Q3	Final grid
1	1	(Netherlands) Max Verstappen	Red Bull Racing-Honda RBPT	1:29.428	1:27.702	1:26.720	1
2	4	(United Kingdom) Lando Norris	McLaren-Mercedes	1:28.917	1:28.042	1:26.961	2
3	81	(Australia) Oscar Piastri	McLaren-Mercedes	1:29.874	1:27.845	1:27.092	3
4	16	(Monaco) Charles Leclerc	Ferrari	1:29.143	1:28.361	1:27.136	4
5	55	(Spain) Carlos Sainz Jr.	Ferrari	1:29.865	1:28.265	1:27.148	5
6	63	(United Kingdom) George Russell	Mercedes	1:29.412	1:28.782	1:27.155	6
7	44	(United Kingdom) Lewis Hamilton	Mercedes	1:29.415	1:28.545	1:27.211	7
8	23	(Thailand) Alexander Albon	Williams-Mercedes	1:29.466	1:28.067	1:27.530	8
9	14	(Spain) Fernando Alonso	Aston Martin Aramco-Mercedes	1:29.949	1:28.368	1:27.659	9
10	10	(France) Pierre Gasly	Alpine-Renault	1:29.533	1:28.751	1:27.689	10
11	27	(Germany) Nico Hülkenberg	Haas-Ferrari	1:29.603	1:28.896	N/A	11
12	18	(Canada) Lance Stroll	Aston Martin Aramco-Mercedes	1:29.448	1:28.935	N/A	12
13	31	(France) Esteban Ocon	Alpine-Renault	1:29.700	1:28.956	N/A	13
14	2	(United States) Logan Sargeant	Williams-Mercedes	1:29.873	1:29.031	N/A	14
15	11	(Mexico) Sergio Pérez	Red Bull Racing-Honda RBPT	1:29.968	N/A	N/A	15
16	22	(Japan) Yuki Tsunoda	AlphaTauri-Honda RBPT	1:30.025	N/A	N/A	16
17	24	(China) Zhou Guanyu	Alfa Romeo-Ferrari	1:30.123	N/A	N/A	17
18	21	(Netherlands) Nyck de Vries	AlphaTauri-Honda RBPT	1:30.513	N/A	N/A	18
19	20	(Denmark) Kevin Magnussen	Haas-Ferrari	1:32.378	N/A	N/A	19
DSQ	77	(Finland) Valtteri Bottas	Alfa Romeo-Ferrari	1:29.798	No time	N/A	20^{a}
107% time: 1:35.141^{b}

Notes

- ^a – Valtteri Bottas qualified 15th, but he was disqualified as his car was unable to provide a 1 litre (0.22 imp gal; 0.26 US gal) sample of fuel. He was permitted to race at the stewards' discretion.
- ^b – As qualifying was held on a wet track, the 107% rule was not in force.

== Race ==
The race was held on 9 July 2023, at 15:00 local time (UTC+1).

=== Race report ===
Lando Norris got a better start off the line against polesitter Max Verstappen; he proceeded to lead the race for four laps before a DRS-assisted Verstappen overtook him by lap four. Verstappen would take the fastest lap and lead the rest of the race.

As the first lap began, numerous cars tussled at the rear of the field. Lewis Hamilton passed Pierre Gasly and would begin to chase Fernando Alonso, only to be held up behind him; he eventually passed him with a DRS move. Lance Stroll and Esteban Ocon fought for position before Ocon retired on lap 12 due to a hydraulics leak, Alexander Albon was in tenth.

Rain was reported during the race, but was not heavy enough to warrant the usage of wet weather tyres. Drivers began to change to differing types of dry tyres, with Yuki Tsunoda being the first to do so with a change onto the softs. Charles Leclerc changed onto hard compound tyres. At this point, Verstappen had extended his lead; meanwhile, Norris, who turned his attention to the drivers behind him, felt satisfied with his pace. His teammate Oscar Piastri, reacting to Pérez's stop, changed his tyres and rejoined ahead of Leclerc and George Russell.

The Ferrari power unit in Kevin Magnussen's Haas caught fire on lap 32, forcing his retirement. The virtual safety car was initially deployed, this was later upgraded to a full safety car. The safety car allowed the field to change their tyres. Hamilton jumped Piastri and Russell in the pit lane and came out in third place. The Ferrari drivers of Carlos Sainz Jr. and Leclerc were unlucky with the two losing positions during the stop. Meanwhile, Zhou Guanyu reported brake duct issues.

On the safety car restart, Verstappen kept the lead until the end as numerous battles were occurring behind him. Hamilton was behind Norris and was unsuccessful in his attempts to overtake. Albon and Leclerc also had a battle through the final laps. Stroll made contact with Gasly's rear-right suspension, which forced the latter into retirement. Stroll was given a five-second penalty for the incident. Sergio Pérez recovered from qualifying fifteenth to finish in sixth place.

Verstappen's victory was his first British Grand Prix win and his second at Silverstone after his triumph at the 2020 70th Anniversary Grand Prix. Norris's second place was his and McLaren's first podium since the 2022 Emilia Romagna Grand Prix and his joint best Formula One result, having previously finished second at the 2021 Italian Grand Prix. The podiums of Hamilton and Norris ensured that this was the first time since David Coulthard and Eddie Irvine finished first and second, respectively, in the 1999 British Grand Prix that two home drivers representing the United Kingdom stood on the podium together in the race. Norris also became the first British driver other than Hamilton to score a podium position on home soil since Coulthard did so with victory at the 2000 British Grand Prix.

=== Race classification ===
Pos.	No.	Driver	Constructor	Laps	Time/Retired	Grid	Points
1	1	(Netherlands) Max Verstappen	Red Bull Racing-Honda RBPT	52	1:25:16.938	1	26^{a}
2	4	(United Kingdom) Lando Norris	McLaren-Mercedes	52	+3.798	2	18
3	44	(United Kingdom) Lewis Hamilton	Mercedes	52	+6.783	7	15
4	81	(Australia) Oscar Piastri	McLaren-Mercedes	52	+7.776	3	12
5	63	(United Kingdom) George Russell	Mercedes	52	+11.206	6	10
6	11	(Mexico) Sergio Pérez	Red Bull Racing-Honda RBPT	52	+12.882	15	8
7	14	(Spain) Fernando Alonso	Aston Martin Aramco-Mercedes	52	+17.193	9	6
8	23	(Thailand) Alexander Albon	Williams-Mercedes	52	+17.878	8	4
9	16	(Monaco) Charles Leclerc	Ferrari	52	+18.689	4	2
10	55	(Spain) Carlos Sainz Jr.	Ferrari	52	+19.448	5	1
11	2	(United States) Logan Sargeant	Williams-Mercedes	52	+23.632	14	
12	77	(Finland) Valtteri Bottas	Alfa Romeo-Ferrari	52	+25.830	20	
13	27	(Germany) Nico Hülkenberg	Haas-Ferrari	52	+26.663	11	
14	18	(Canada) Lance Stroll	Aston Martin Aramco-Mercedes	52	+27.483^{b}	12	
15	24	(China) Zhou Guanyu	Alfa Romeo-Ferrari	52	+29.820	17	
16	22	(Japan) Yuki Tsunoda	AlphaTauri-Honda RBPT	52	+31.225	16	
17	21	(Netherlands) Nyck de Vries	AlphaTauri-Honda RBPT	52	+33.128	18	
18^{c}	10	(France) Pierre Gasly	Alpine-Renault	46	Collision	10	
Ret	20	(Denmark) Kevin Magnussen	Haas-Ferrari	31	Engine	19	
Ret	31	(France) Esteban Ocon	Alpine-Renault	9	Oil leak	13	
Fastest lap: (Netherlands) Max Verstappen (Red Bull Racing-Honda RBPT) – 1:30.275 (lap 42)

Notes

- ^a – Includes one point for fastest lap.
- ^b – Lance Stroll finished 11th, but he received a five-second time penalty for causing a collision with Pierre Gasly.
- ^c – Pierre Gasly was classified as he completed more than 90% of the race distance.

== Championship standings after the race ==
Drivers' Championship standings

Pos.	Driver	Points
1	(Netherlands) Max Verstappen	255
2	(Mexico) Sergio Pérez	156
3	(Spain) Fernando Alonso	137
4	(United Kingdom) Lewis Hamilton	121
5	(Spain) Carlos Sainz Jr.	83

Constructors' Championship standings

	Pos.	Constructor	Points
	1	(Austria) Red Bull Racing-Honda RBPT	411
	2	(Germany) Mercedes	203
	3	(United Kingdom) Aston Martin Aramco-Mercedes	181
	4	(Italy) Ferrari	157
1	5	(United Kingdom) McLaren-Mercedes	59

- Note: Only the top five positions are included for both sets of standings.

== See also ==
- 2023 Silverstone Formula 2 round
- 2023 Silverstone Formula 3 round

Previous race: 2023 Austrian Grand Prix	FIA Formula One World Championship; 2023 season	Next race: 2023 Hungarian Grand Prix
Previous race: 2022 British Grand Prix	British Grand Prix	Next race: 2024 British Grand Prix
