= 2024 British Grand Prix =

Formula One motor race

Race 12 of 24 in the 2024 Formula One World Championship
← Previous race	Next race →
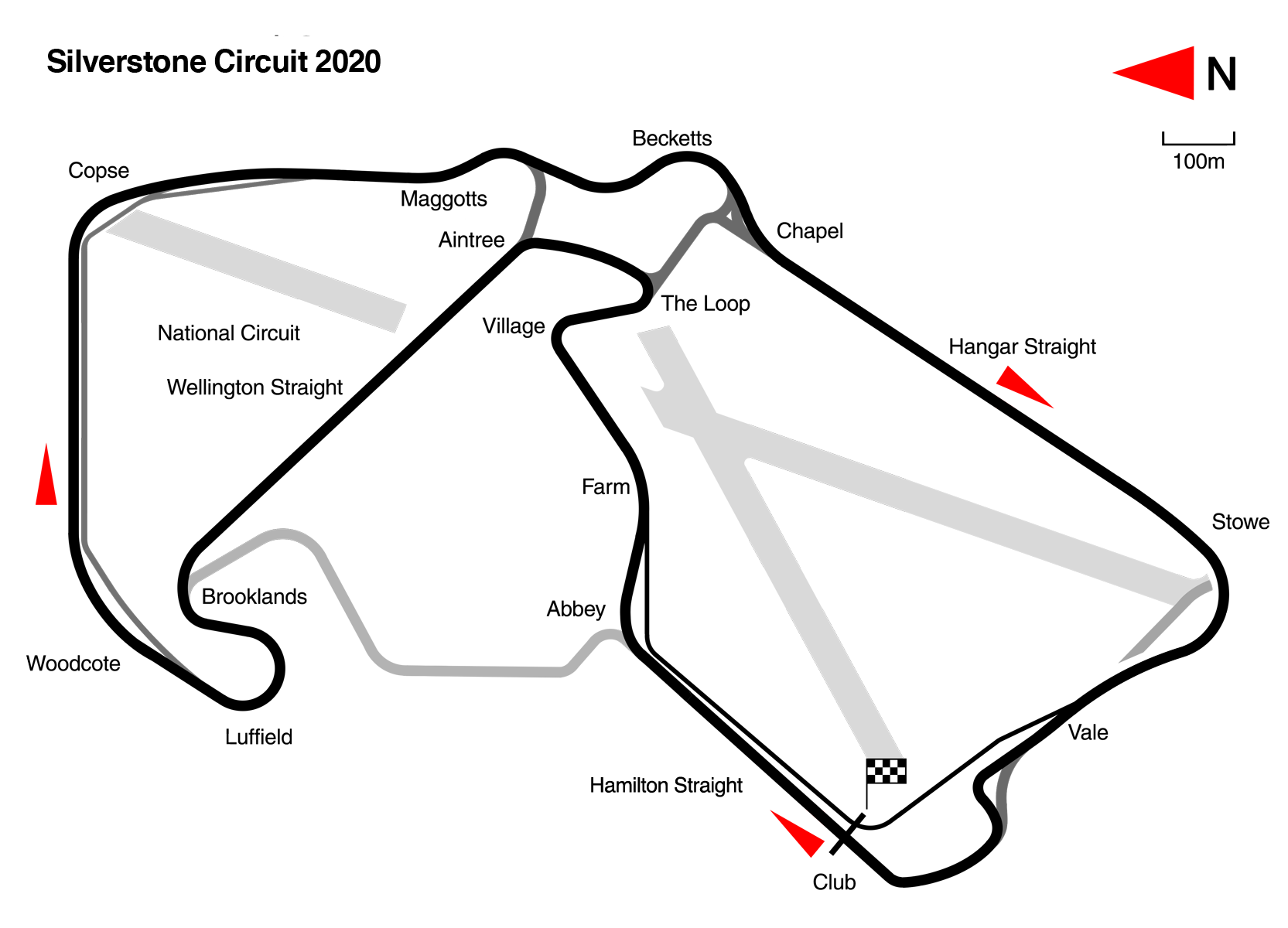
- Layout of the Silverstone Circuit

Race details
- Date: 7 July 2024
- Official name: Formula 1 Qatar Airways British Grand Prix 2024
- Location: Silverstone Circuit; Silverstone, United Kingdom
- Course: Permanent racing facility
- Course length: 5.891 km (3.660 miles)
- Distance: 52 laps, 306.198 km (190.263 miles)
- Weather: Intermittent rain
- Attendance: 480,000

Pole position
Driver	(United Kingdom) George Russell	Mercedes
- Time: 1:25.819

Fastest lap
Driver	(Spain) Carlos Sainz Jr.	Ferrari
- Time: 1:28.293 on lap 52

Podium
First	(United Kingdom) Lewis Hamilton	Mercedes
Second	(Netherlands) Max Verstappen	Red Bull Racing-Honda RBPT
Third	(United Kingdom) Lando Norris	McLaren-Mercedes

The 2024 British Grand Prix (officially known as the Formula 1 Qatar Airways British Grand Prix 2024) was a Formula One motor race that took place on 7 July 2024 at the Silverstone Circuit in Northamptonshire, England. It was the twelfth round of the 2024 Formula One World Championship.

George Russell of Mercedes took pole position, but abruptly retired mid-race due to a water leak in his car. Teammate Lewis Hamilton won the race for what was his first win since the 2021 Saudi Arabian Grand Prix more than two seasons prior, ahead of championship leader Max Verstappen of Red Bull Racing and Lando Norris of McLaren. The win was Hamilton's 104th career victory and his record ninth British Grand Prix victory.

By finishing ahead of Norris in the race, Verstappen increased his advantage in the World Drivers' Championship to 84 points, Charles Leclerc remained in third at 150 points following his second consecutive pointless race. His teammate Carlos Sainz Jr. closed the deficit to Leclerc to four points, while Oscar Piastri moved to fifth in the standings with 124 points. Red Bull extended their lead in the World Constructors' Championship to 71 points, with Ferrari and McLaren, who were second and third respectively, covered by seven points.

== Background ==
The event was held at the Silverstone Circuit in Northamptonshire for the 59th time in the circuit's history, across the weekend of 5–7 July. The Grand Prix was the twelfth round of the 2024 Formula One World Championship and the 75th running of the British Grand Prix as a round of the Formula One World Championship.

=== Championship standings before the race ===
Going into the weekend, Max Verstappen led the Drivers' Championship with 237 points, 81 points ahead of Lando Norris in second, and 87 ahead of Charles Leclerc in third. Red Bull Racing, with 355 points, led the Constructors' Championship from Ferrari and McLaren, who were second and third with 291 and 268 points, respectively.

=== Entrants ===
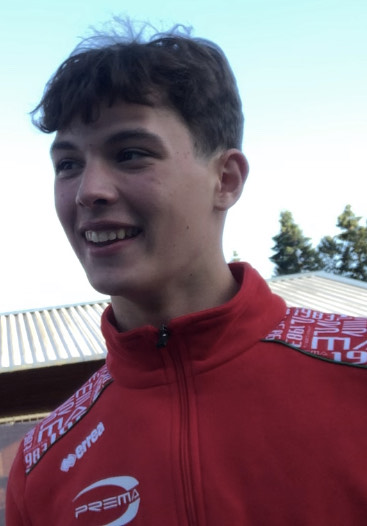
Oliver Bearman

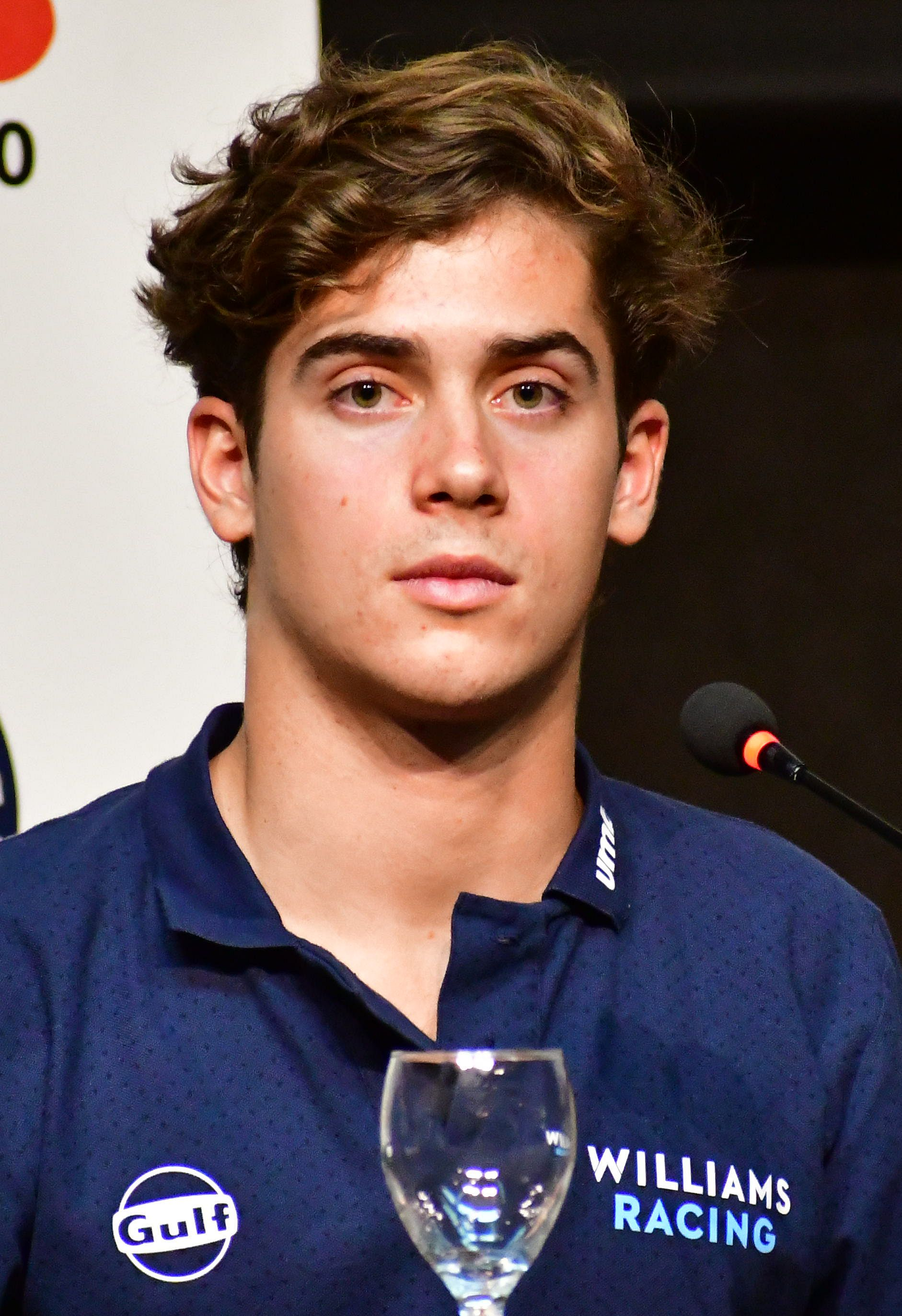
Franco Colapinto

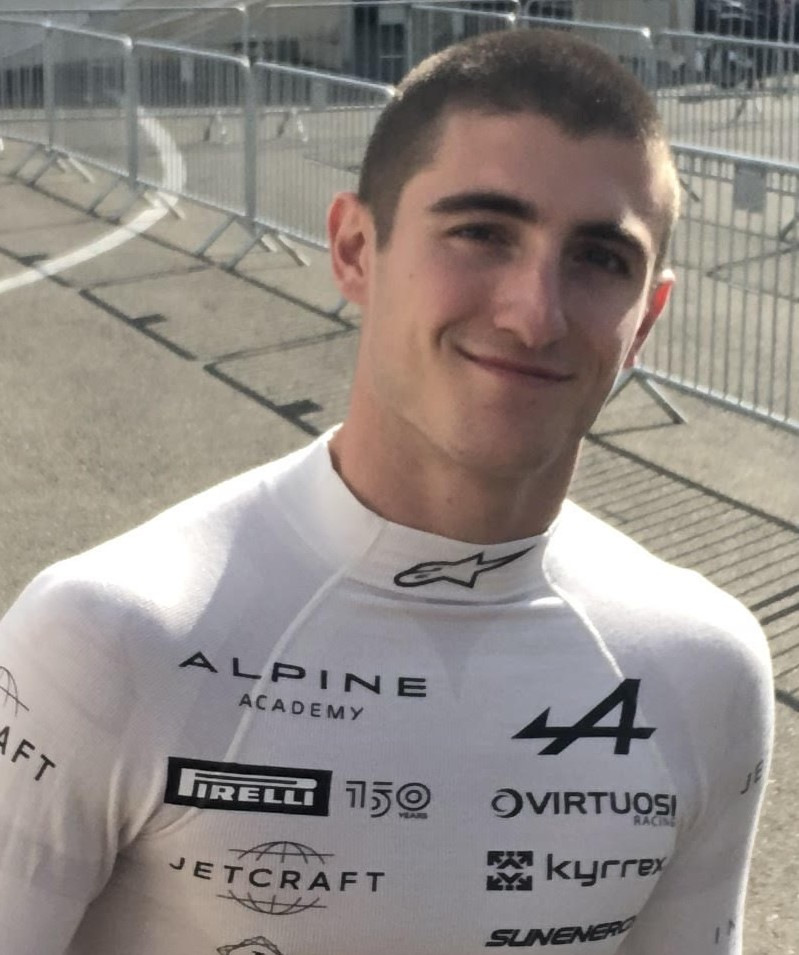
Jack Doohan

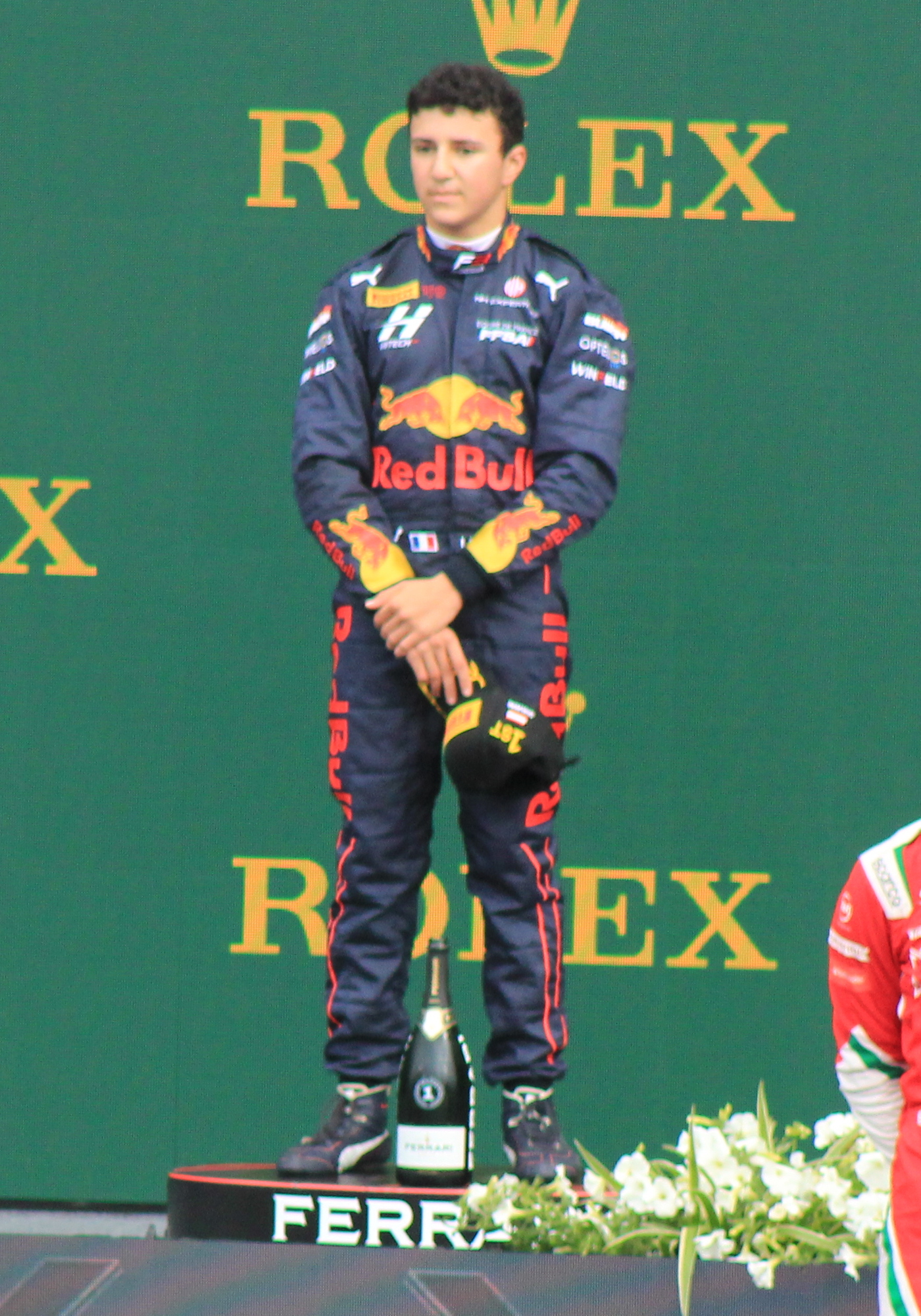
Isack Hadjar

Bearman, Colapinto, Doohan and Hadjar drove in the first free practice session in place of regular drivers.

The drivers and teams were the same as the season entry list with no additional stand-in drivers for the race. In the first free practice session, Oliver Bearman stood in for Kevin Magnussen for Haas, Franco Colapinto replaced Logan Sargeant at Williams, Jack Doohan drove instead of Pierre Gasly for Alpine and Isack Hadjar was in for Red Bull Racing in place of Sergio Pérez. Colapinto made his Formula One practice debut.

=== Tyre choices ===
Tyre supplier Pirelli brought the C1, C2, and C3 tyre compounds (the three hardest in their range) designated hard, medium, and soft, respectively, for teams to use at the event.

== Practice ==
Three free practice sessions were held for the event. The first free practice session was held on 5 July 2024, at 12:30 local time (UTC+1), and was topped by Lando Norris of McLaren ahead of Lance Stroll of Aston Martin and Norris's teammate Oscar Piastri. The second free practice session was held on the same day, at 16:00 local time, and was topped by Norris ahead of Piastri and Sergio Pérez of Red Bull Racing. The third free practice session was held on 6 July 2024, at 11:30 local time, and was topped by George Russell of Mercedes ahead of his teammate Lewis Hamilton and Norris.

== Qualifying ==
Qualifying was held on 6 July 2024, at 15:00 local time (UTC+1).

=== Qualifying classification ===
Pos.	No.	Driver	Constructor	Qualifying times			Final grid
Pos.	No.	Driver	Constructor	Q1	Q2	Q3	Final grid
1	63	(United Kingdom) George Russell	Mercedes	1:30.106	1:26.723	1:25.819	1
2	44	(United Kingdom) Lewis Hamilton	Mercedes	1:29.547	1:26.770	1:25.990	2
3	4	(United Kingdom) Lando Norris	McLaren-Mercedes	1:31.596	1:26.559	1:26.030	3
4	1	(Netherlands) Max Verstappen	Red Bull Racing-Honda RBPT	1:31.342	1:26.796	1:26.203	4
5	81	(Australia) Oscar Piastri	McLaren-Mercedes	1:30.895	1:26.733	1:26.237	5
6	27	(Germany) Nico Hülkenberg	Haas-Ferrari	1:31.929	1:26.847	1:26.338	6
7	55	(Spain) Carlos Sainz Jr.	Ferrari	1:30.557	1:26.843	1:26.509	7
8	18	(Canada) Lance Stroll	Aston Martin Aramco-Mercedes	1:31.410	1:26.938	1:26.585	8
9	23	(Thailand) Alexander Albon	Williams-Mercedes	1:31.135	1:26.933	1:26.640	9
10	14	(Spain) Fernando Alonso	Aston Martin Aramco-Mercedes	1:31.264	1:26.730	1:26.917	10
11	16	(Monaco) Charles Leclerc	Ferrari	1:30.496	1:27.097	N/A	11
12	2	(United States) Logan Sargeant	Williams-Mercedes	1:31.608	1:27.175	N/A	12
13	22	(Japan) Yuki Tsunoda	RB-Honda RBPT	1:30.994	1:27.269	N/A	13
14	24	(China) Zhou Guanyu	Kick Sauber-Ferrari	1:31.190	1:27.867	N/A	14
15	3	(Australia) Daniel Ricciardo	RB-Honda RBPT	1:31.291	1:27.949	N/A	15
16	77	(Finland) Valtteri Bottas	Kick Sauber-Ferrari	1:32.431	N/A	N/A	16
17	20	(Denmark) Kevin Magnussen	Haas-Ferrari	1:32.905	N/A	N/A	17
18	31	(France) Esteban Ocon	Alpine-Renault	1:34.557	N/A	N/A	18
19	11	(Mexico) Sergio Pérez	Red Bull Racing-Honda RBPT	1:38.348	N/A	N/A	PL^{a}
20	10	(France) Pierre Gasly	Alpine-Renault	1:39.804	N/A	N/A	19^{b}
107% time: 1:35.815^{c}

Notes

- ^a – Sergio Pérez qualified 19th, but was required to start the race from the pit lane for replacing power unit elements without the approval of the technical delegate during parc fermé.
- ^b – Pierre Gasly was required to start the race from the back of the grid for exceeding his quota of power unit elements. He gained a position as Sergio Pérez started the race from the pit lane.
- ^c – As qualifying was held on a wet track, the 107% rule was not in force.

== Race ==
=== Race report ===
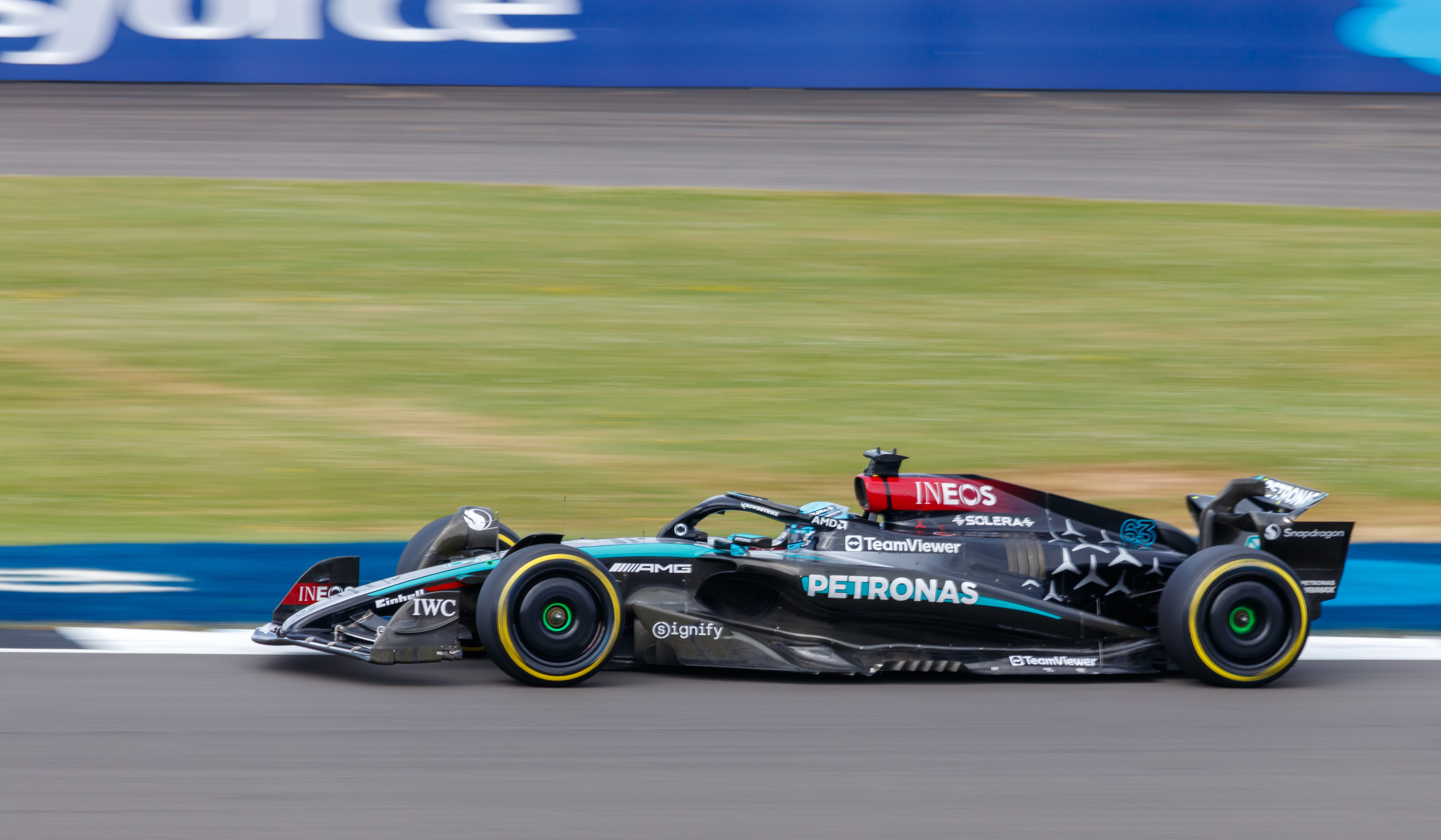
Pole sitter George Russell suffered a water leak and retired on lap 34

The race was held on 7 July 2024, at 15:00 local time (UTC+1), and was run for 52 laps. At the race start, Russell kept his spot at the front, while Verstappen jumped to third ahead of Norris. Norris would eventually get back in front of Verstappen on lap 15 and started chasing after the two Mercedes, with teammate Oscar Piastri following suit two laps later. As the weather slowly transitioned to rain, Hamilton overtook Russell at Stowe corner on lap 18, but both ran off the track at Abbey just a few corners later. Norris took advantage to get past Russell almost immediately after, then got past Hamilton a lap later.

On lap 27, Verstappen pitted for the intermediate tyres, being the first runner in the top five to do so. Norris, Hamilton and Russell all pitted for inters as well on lap 28, but Piastri waited a lap more. This resulted in him dropping to sixth when he would eventually switch to inters on lap 29. Five laps later, Russell unexpectedly retired from the race in the pit lane due to an issue with his water pressure. This left Hamilton as the sole Mercedes contender for the win. On lap 39, Hamilton and Verstappen switched from their intermediates to slicks - Hamilton on softs and Verstappen on hards - while Norris waited a lap to switch to the softs. Once Norris came out, he found himself behind Hamilton and ahead of Verstappen. Verstappen passed Norris with five laps left and tried to catch Hamilton, but Hamilton stayed ahead to win from Verstappen and Norris. It was Hamilton's first victory since the 2021 Saudi Arabian Grand Prix. Additionally, it was his ninth overall victory at the British Grand Prix, breaking the record for the most wins at a single circuit.

=== Post-race debrief ===
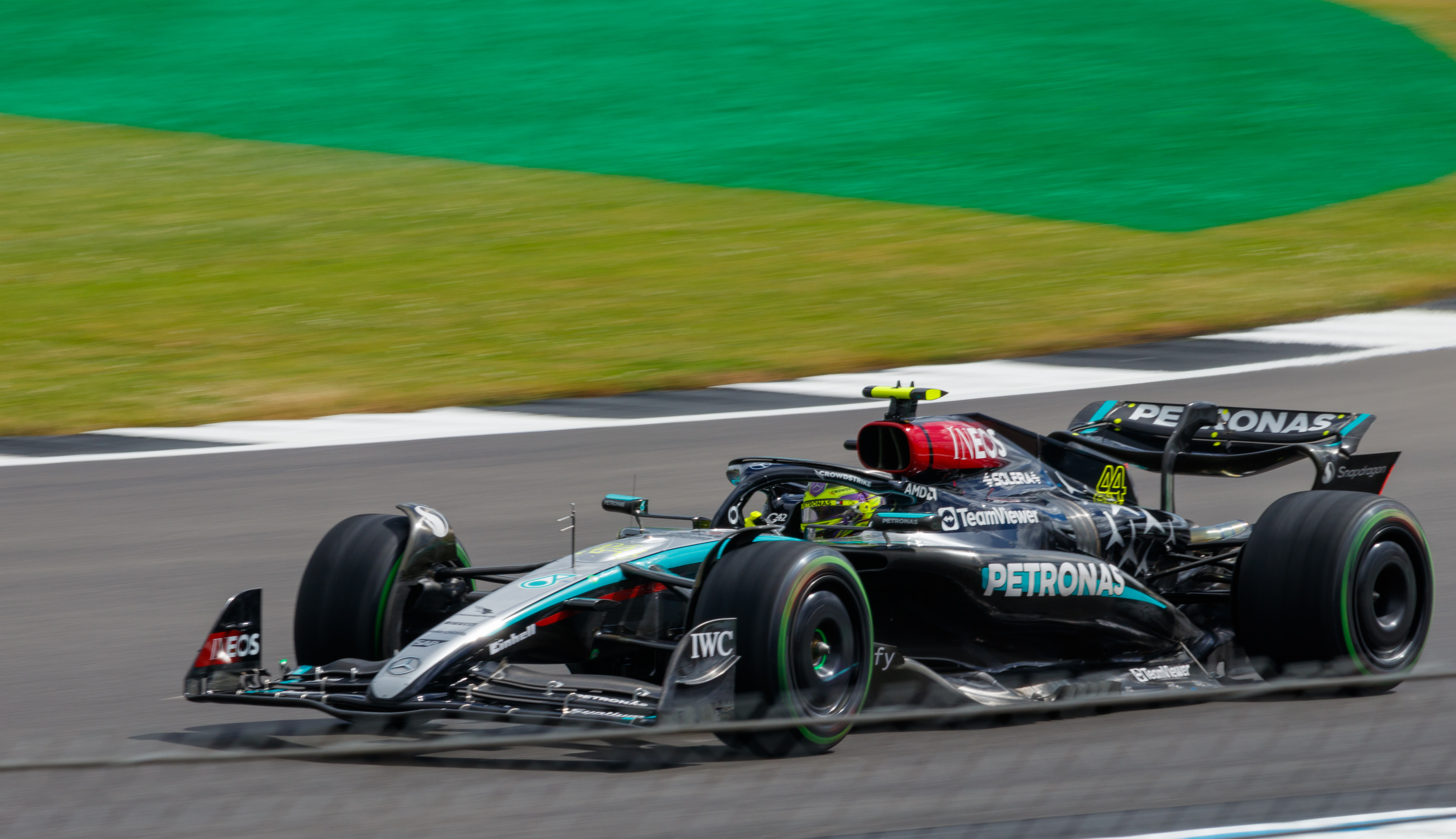
Hamilton took his first victory in three seasons.

Speaking after the race, Hamilton admitted there have "been some days since 2021 and here where I didn't feel like I was good enough, or whether I was going to get back where I am today." His father Anthony stated he had "full confidence that, whatever happened, he was going to give his best, and when Lewis gives his best it normally ends up with the win." Hamilton became the first driver to win a Grand Prix beyond his 300th race start, as all other previous drivers to reach 300 starts - Rubens Barrichello, Michael Schumacher, Jenson Button, Kimi Räikkönen and Fernando Alonso - either failed to do so or have yet to do so.

Second-placed finisher Verstappen credited his team Red Bull Racing for making the call to switch him onto the hard tyres instead of the soft tyres for the final stint, believing he could not have been higher had it been otherwise. Norris praised Hamilton for his victory but rued the lost opportunity for himself, stating "These tricky conditions are always on a knife-edge, and you’re risking a lot. So many things good, but a few too many letdowns today." Russell expressed his disappointment in being forced to pull out of the race, believing he "had a shot of at least a podium.”

=== Race classification ===
Pos.	No.	Driver	Constructor	Laps	Time/Retired	Grid	Points
1	44	(United Kingdom) Lewis Hamilton	Mercedes	52	1:22:27.059	2	25
2	1	(Netherlands) Max Verstappen	Red Bull Racing-Honda RBPT	52	+1.465	4	18
3	4	(United Kingdom) Lando Norris	McLaren-Mercedes	52	+7.547	3	15
4	81	(Australia) Oscar Piastri	McLaren-Mercedes	52	+12.429	5	12
5	55	(Spain) Carlos Sainz Jr.	Ferrari	52	+47.318	7	11^{a}
6	27	(Germany) Nico Hülkenberg	Haas-Ferrari	52	+55.722	6	8
7	18	(Canada) Lance Stroll	Aston Martin Aramco-Mercedes	52	+56.569	8	6
8	14	(Spain) Fernando Alonso	Aston Martin Aramco-Mercedes	52	+1:03.577	10	4
9	23	(Thailand) Alexander Albon	Williams-Mercedes	52	+1:08.387	9	2
10	22	(Japan) Yuki Tsunoda	RB-Honda RBPT	52	+1:19.303	13	1
11	2	(United States) Logan Sargeant	Williams-Mercedes	52	+1:28.960	12	
12	20	(Denmark) Kevin Magnussen	Haas-Ferrari	52	+1:30.153	17	
13	3	(Australia) Daniel Ricciardo	RB-Honda RBPT	51	+1 lap	15	
14	16	(Monaco) Charles Leclerc	Ferrari	51	+1 lap	11	
15	77	(Finland) Valtteri Bottas	Kick Sauber-Ferrari	51	+1 lap	16	
16	31	(France) Esteban Ocon	Alpine-Renault	50	+2 laps	18	
17	11	(Mexico) Sergio Pérez	Red Bull Racing-Honda RBPT	50	+2 laps	PL	
18	24	(China) Zhou Guanyu	Kick Sauber-Ferrari	50	+2 laps	14	
Ret	63	(United Kingdom) George Russell	Mercedes	33	Water leak	1	
DNS	10	(France) Pierre Gasly	Alpine-Renault	0	Gearbox	—^{b}	
Fastest lap: (Spain) Carlos Sainz Jr. (Ferrari) – 1:28.293 (lap 52)

Notes

- ^a – Includes one point for fastest lap.
- ^b – Pierre Gasly did not start the race due to a gearbox issue. His position on the grid was left vacant.

== Championship standings after the race ==
Drivers' Championship standings

	Pos.	Driver	Points
	1	(Netherlands) Max Verstappen	255
	2	(United Kingdom) Lando Norris	171
	3	(Monaco) Charles Leclerc	150
	4	(Spain) Carlos Sainz Jr.	146
1	5	(Australia) Oscar Piastri	124

Constructors' Championship standings

Pos.	Constructor	Points
1	(Austria) Red Bull Racing-Honda RBPT	373
2	(Italy) Ferrari	302
3	(United Kingdom) McLaren-Mercedes	295
4	(Germany) Mercedes	221
5	(United Kingdom) Aston Martin Aramco-Mercedes	68

- Note: Only the top five positions are included for both sets of standings.

== See also ==
- 2024 Silverstone Formula 2 round
- 2024 Silverstone Formula 3 round

Previous race: 2024 Austrian Grand Prix	FIA Formula One World Championship; 2024 season	Next race: 2024 Hungarian Grand Prix
Previous race: 2023 British Grand Prix	British Grand Prix	Next race: 2025 British Grand Prix
