= British Grand Prix =

Formula One Grand Prix

- Silverstone Circuit
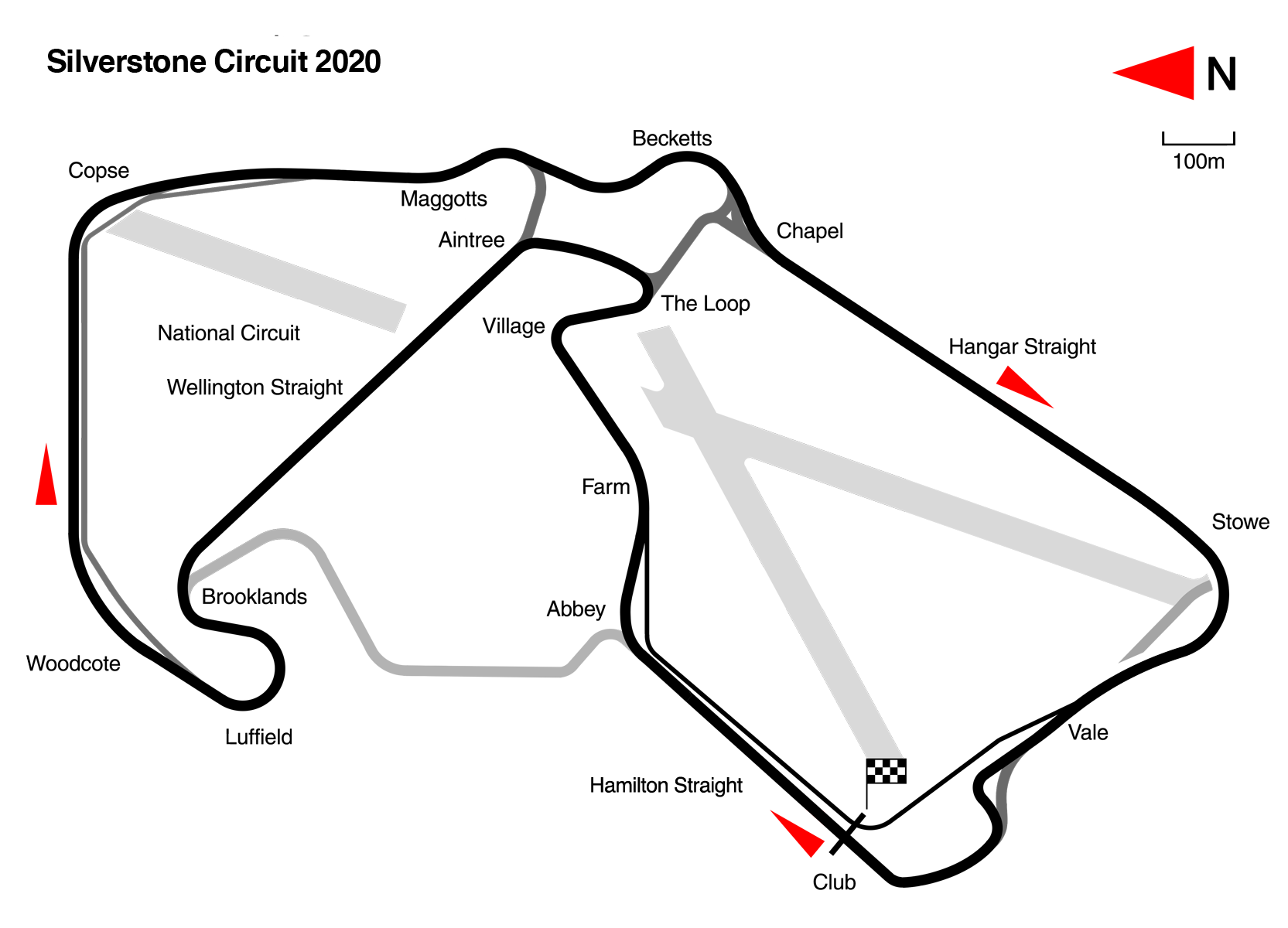

Race information
- Number of times held: 81
- First held: 1926
- Most wins (drivers): (United Kingdom) Lewis Hamilton (9)
- Most wins (constructors): (Italy) Ferrari (19)
- Circuit length: 5.891 km (3.66 miles)
- Race length: 306.198 km (190.263 miles)
- Laps: 52

Last race (2026)

Pole position
- (Italy) Kimi Antonelli; Mercedes; 1:28.111

Podium
- 1. (Monaco) C. Leclerc; Ferrari; 1:27:11.335; 2. (United Kingdom) G. Russell; Mercedes; +0.427; 3. (United Kingdom) L. Hamilton; Ferrari; +0.772

Fastest lap
- (Italy) Kimi Antonelli; Mercedes; 1:31.777

The British Grand Prix is a Grand Prix motor racing event organised in the United Kingdom by Motorsport UK. First held by the Royal Automobile Club (RAC) in 1926, the British Grand Prix has been held annually since 1948 and has been a round of the FIA Formula One World Championship every year since 1950. In 1952, following the transfer of the lease of the Silverstone Circuit to the British Racing Drivers' Club, the RAC delegated the organisation of races held at Silverstone to the BRDC, and those held at Aintree to the British Automobile Racing Club. This arrangement lasted until the RAC created the Motor Sports Association in the late 1970s and it reclaimed organising control of the event. The RAC MSA was renamed Motorsport UK in 2018–19 when it formally split from the RAC.

The British Grand Prix is currently held at the Silverstone Circuit near the village of Silverstone in Northamptonshire in England. The 2019 event was the 70th time that the race had been run as a World Championship event since the inaugural season in 1950, and the 53rd time that a World Championship round had been held at Silverstone.

The British race is the oldest in the Formula One World Championship calendar as the 1950 race at Silverstone was round one of the first championship season in 1950. It and the Italian Grand Prix are the only two Formula One World Championship Grands Prix that have been staged during every season that the championship has been held. The British Grand Prix was a round of the World Manufacturers' Championship in both 1926 and 1927, but was never held during the existence of the European Championship. It was designated the European Grand Prix five times between 1950 and 1977, when this title was an honorary designation given each year to one Grand Prix race in Europe. All British Grands Prix dating back to 1926 have been held in England, where the British motor racing industry is primarily located.

The event is due to take place at Silverstone Circuit until at least 2034.

== History ==
=== Brooklands (1926–1927) ===
The concrete Brooklands oval was built in 1907 near Weybridge in Surrey, near the British capital of London. It was the first purpose-built motor racing venue, as well as one of the first airfields in the United Kingdom. Grand Prix motor racing first came to Britain in 1926, following the successes of Henry Segrave in winning the 1923 French Grand Prix and the San Sebastián Grand Prix the following year, both in a Sunbeam Grand Prix car, which raised interest in the sport domestically and demonstrated to the AIACR that the advances made in the British motor industry merited the honour of hosting an international grand prix motor race. The first ever British Grand Prix (officially known as the Grand Prix of the Royal Automobile Club) was held at Brooklands on 7 August 1926 and was won by Robert Sénéchal and Louis Wagner driving a Delage 15 S 8. The second Grand Prix of the RAC was also held at Brooklands, on 1 October 1927, and was again won by a Delage 15 S 8, this time driven by Robert Benoist.

Several non-championship races known as the Donington Grand Prix were held at Donington Park in Leicestershire near Derby which attracted the best European teams in 1937 and 1938, where the German Mercedes and Auto Unions dominated the proceedings. The German Bernd Rosemeyer and the Italian Tazio Nuvolari (both driving mid-engined Auto Union cars) won this race in 1937 and 1938, respectively, but as the races were organised by the Derby & District Motor Club rather than by (or on behalf of) the Royal Automobile Club, they are not usually accorded the "British Grand Prix" title.

=== Silverstone (1948–1954) ===
Brooklands had been severely damaged by the onset of World War II and the circuit was abandoned. Most new British circuits were being built on disused Royal Air Force airfields, and Silverstone, located on the Northamptonshire/Buckinghamshire border in central England equidistant between London and Birmingham (the latter being the capital of the UK production car industry)- was one of those circuits. It staged its first race, the Royal Automobile Club International Grand Prix on 2 October 1948, which was won by Italian Luigi Villoresi in a Maserati. In 1949, the circuit was heavily modified and made very fast; and it remained in this configuration for decades.

In 1950, the World Championship of Drivers was introduced, and the 1950 British Grand Prix was the first World Championship Formula One race ever held, with new regulations and 6 other races in Europe. This race was won by Alfa Romeo driver Giuseppe "Nino" Farina. King George VI was among the attendees of the race. The 1951 race was particularly exciting, as it was the first F1 race not won by an Alfa Romeo; the gas-guzzling Italian cars were beaten by another Italian car- the more fuel-efficient Ferrari of Argentine José Froilán González in what was the famed Scuderia's first ever Formula One victory. For the 1952 event, the original pits between Abbey and Woodcote were abandoned and demolished. A new pit complex was constructed between Woodcote and Copse corners; Alberto Ascari dominated this and the next year's race; González won again in 1954 in a Ferrari.

=== Silverstone and Aintree (1955–1962) ===
In 1955, the Formula One circus began to alternate between Silverstone and the Aintree circuit, located on the Grand National horse racing course near Liverpool. Mercedes drivers Juan Manuel Fangio and home favourite Stirling Moss arrived at Aintree expecting to win. They took the lead at the start and the two drivers battled throughout, and Moss passed Fangio on the 26th lap, and he kept the lead for a while; but Fangio fought back and was about to pass Moss on the last corner on the last lap, and all were certain Fangio would pip Moss at the chequered flag. But he didn't, and Moss won his first Formula One race on home soil. Moss later asked Fangio "did you let me through?" and the Argentine replied "No. You were better than me that day". Mercedes romped to the finish 1–2–3–4, with German Karl Kling and Italian Piero Taruffi finishing 3rd and 4th.

The even-numbered years were at Silverstone and the odd numbered and 1962 were at Aintree. 1956 saw Fangio win in a Ferrari, and 1957 returned to see Moss win again in a Vanwall; he took over his ill teammate Tony Brooks's car and stormed through the field to take victory. This was the first Grand Prix victory for a British-built car- Formula One would soon be mostly made up of British teams. 1958 was when Peter Collins won in a Ferrari and Bernie Ecclestone was entered in a Connaught but his car was driven by Jack Fairman, and 1959 and 1960 saw Australian Jack Brabham win in a mid-engined Cooper. The last race at Aintree was in 1962 when Briton Jim Clark won his first of 5 British Grands Prix; Aintree was decommissioned in 1964.

=== Silverstone and Brands Hatch (1963–1986) ===
1964 saw the first Formula One race at the southern English circuit known as Brands Hatch, located in ancient woodlands in Kent, 20 miles southeast from the center of London. The track was built in the early 1950s and had been extended in 1960 to include the new Grand Prix course. Silverstone hosted the British Grand Prix in odd-numbered years and Brands Hatch in even-numbered years. Like the year before at Silverstone, Clark won the 1964 race and the next year's race. 1967 saw Clark take yet another dominant win, and 1968 saw a monumental battle between Swiss Jo Siffert in a Lotus and New Zealander Chris Amon in a Ferrari; Siffert won the race, his first of two victories in F1 on the circuit where he would be killed in a non-championship race three years later.

In 1969 there was another big battle between home favourite Jackie Stewart and Austrian Jochen Rindt, that went on for a while; although Rindt had a loose rear wing and had to come into the pits to get it repaired; Stewart took the chequered flag driving a Ford/Cosworth-powered Matra for Ken Tyrrell. Rindt won the 1970 event at the expense of Brabham running out of fuel at the end of the race, and 1971 saw Stewart win again in a Tyrrell (Ken Tyrrell had started building his own cars). 1973, however, saw a huge first lap accident at Woodcote that took out 11 cars, including all three works Surtees cars. Amazingly, there were no deaths or any fires and the worst news was that Andrea de Adamich received career-ending ankle injuries. 1974 saw Austrian up-and-comer Niki Lauda dominate the race in his Ferrari, however, a rear-tire puncture slowed his car and rivals Jody Scheckter and Emerson Fittipaldi passed Lauda to take 1st and 2nd.

In 1975 a chicane added to Woodcote to slow cars going through the very high-speed corner; and this was another race of variables as a rainstorm hit the track and a number of drivers including Scheckter and Briton James Hunt hydroplaned off the track at the same corner; Fittipaldi won the race after it was called short due to storm. 1976 also saw changes to Brands Hatch including making the fearsome Paddock Hill bend a bit tamer, South Bank corner more of a left-hand apex rather than a long hairpin and moving Bottom Straight further south so that the pits and paddock area could be expanded. This race proved to be very controversial; as home favourite Hunt won the race but was later disqualified following a protest from Ferrari and other teams about Hunt not completing the first lap of the race; and the victory went to second-placed Lauda. In 1977, Hunt take victory without any controversy and when F1 returned to Silverstone two years later, Australian Alan Jones lapped the circuit more than 6 seconds inside the lap record in his ground-effect Williams. His teammate Clay Regazzoni won the race, Williams's first F1 victory. 1980 saw Jones win after the Ligiers of Jacques Laffite and Didier Pironi retired. In 1981 French rising star Alain Prost thoroughly dominate the first part race in his Renault; and there was an accident involving Canadian Gilles Villeneuve at the Woodcote Chicane which held up Briton John Watson; but Watson passed several cars and won the race; the first for a car with an all-carbon fibre chassis. 1982 saw polesitter Keke Rosberg having to start from the back due to problems with his Williams and he began a charge that brought him far up the field; but he retired, and there was another spectacular showing from Briton Derek Warwick in his underfunded Toleman; he managed to pass Pironi for 2nd, but he also retired with a broken driveshaft; the victory went to Austrian Niki Lauda.

1983 saw Prost win his first of five British Grands Prix and a spectacular performance from Briton Nigel Mansell in his first outing in a turbocharged Lotus, he started 16th and finished 4th. Lauda won again at Brands Hatch in 1984. During the race FISA president Jean-Marie Balestre announced that the Tyrrell team was to be excluded from that year's championship for fuel irregularities, while the race was restarted after a huge accident at Bottom Bend caused more controversy; Prost and Lauda had passed Brazilian Nelson Piquet on the last lap of the first race, but Piquet started in front of the two McLaren drivers; regulations dictated that the positions were on the grid were to be determined two laps before the restart was called.

In 1985, Keke Rosberg set the all-time Formula 1 qualifying lap record for 17 years after posting a fastest qualifying time for the race with an average speed of 258.983 km/h (160.925 mph). Silverstone, which was already a very fast circuit, was becoming faster and faster and the cars were lapping the circuit in the low 1-minute range. In the race, Ayrton Senna had a great start from 4th and taking the lead by the first corner. He led until late in the race when his car was running out of fuel while Prost was pushing him hard; Senna eventually ran out of fuel and Prost went on to take victory. 1986 saw a huge crowd thanks to Mansell being a favourite to win; his newly found fame and place in a competitive team would help the British Grand Prix to see huge crowds for several years. This race saw 42-year-old Jacques Laffite get involved in a first corner accident and slam head-on into the barriers, breaking both his legs and ending his Formula One career. Nigel Mansell, whose car broke at the start of the first race, got into his teammate Piquet's spare car and won the race; although this was the last F1 race at Brands Hatch. A number of people had concerns about the speeds of the cars on the small track; particularly the European Grand Prix held at Brands Hatch the previous year. The southern English circuit was getting to be very fast-now with these 1,000 hp (750 kW)-plus, 1,180 lb (540 kg) cars, pole sitter Piquet's average qualifying speed was 226.085 km/h (140.483 mph) and his lap time was in the 1 minute 6-second range, compared to the 1 minute 20-second range in 1976. But Brands Hatch's demise was for other reasons: the international motorsports governing body at the time, Fédération Internationale du Sport Automobile (FISA), had instituted a policy of long-term contracts for one circuit per Grand Prix. Brands Hatch was perceived as a poorer facility, and considering most of the track was located in a very old forest it did have very little run-off and room to expand, something Silverstone had in acres. Silverstone and the BRDC had signed a seven-year contract with Formula 1 and FISA at some point in 1986, to run from 1987 to 1993.

=== Silverstone 1987–2017 ===
In 1987 Silverstone was modified; the Woodcote chicane was no longer used and a new left-right chicane was built on the Farm Straight just before Woodcote. Silverstone's layout, like Brands Hatch, had changed little since 1949. The circuit was still fast, and it saw Mansell charge after Piquet (who had decided to run the whole race on one set of tyres) and the British driver broke the lap record 11 times, caught and passed Piquet and took victory; the Silverstone crowd broke ranks and ran onto the circuit after the race was over; this was to start a number of dramatic events surrounding Mansell for the next 5 years. 1988 saw Senna win a rain-soaked event, and Mansell finished 2nd after driving very hard and passing many cars to attempt to catch Senna; this was one of Mansell's two race finishes that season. 1989 saw Prost win in a McLaren after his teammate Senna went off at Becketts; Mansell finished 2nd again driving for Ferrari; and sometime after the event, it was decided that Silverstone, was to be heavily modified, and the project would be completed for 1991. In the 1990 Grand Prix, Mansell drove hard and led a lot of the race; but gearbox problems eventually forced him to retire, where he threw his gloves into the crowd and announced that he was going to retire, a decision that he would later take back. The circuit was now more technical, 15 per cent slower and every corner on the circuit except Copse was different. It also included an infield section right before the pits. After 1992, Mansell had retired from F1, and 1993 saw new Williams driver Damon Hill lead much of the race until his engine blew up, and Hill's French teammate Alain Prost took his 50th career Grand Prix win.

After Roland Ratzenberger and Ayrton Senna were killed in Imola in 1994, a chicane was installed at the flat-out Abbey corner 6 weeks before the event was due to take place and Stowe corner was slowed considerably. Hill won the event, something his double world champion father Graham never did. 1995 saw another British driver, Johnny Herbert, take victory in his Benetton. 1996 saw further changes to the circuit, where Stowe was more or less restored to its 1991 design, and the 1999 event saw double world champion Michael Schumacher crash heavily at Stowe; he broke his leg, missed many races and this put him out of championship contention. There were attempts to bring the British GP back to Brands Hatch for 2002, but this never materialised.

The 2003 event was disrupted by a defrocked priest, Cornelius Horan, who ran onto the Hangar Straight during the race while cars were coming at him at over 260 km/h (160 mph). Marshals were able to get him off the track before he hurt himself or anyone else and he was later arrested; Brazilian Rubens Barrichello won the race for Ferrari. A dispute between Silverstone's owners, the British Racing Drivers' Club (BRDC), and the Formula One authorities in 2003 over the funding of necessary improvements to the track's facilities led to doubts over the future of the race. In October 2004 the British Grand Prix was left off the preliminary race schedule for 2005 because the BRDC refused to pay the race fee demanded by Bernie Ecclestone. However, after months of negotiation between the BRDC, Ecclestone and the Formula One constructors, a deal was made for the Grand Prix to be held at Silverstone until 2009. In 2008, Lewis Hamilton win in pouring rain for McLaren; Hamilton and Jenson Button's presence and success in Formula One helped to see huge crowds at Silverstone not seen since Nigel Mansell's time in the sport. On 4 July, it was announced that Donington Park had been awarded the contract to host the British Grand Prix for 10 years from 2010. However, Donington failed to secure the necessary funding to host the race, and its contract was terminated in November 2009. On 7 December 2009, Silverstone signed a 17-year contract to host the British Grand Prix from 2010 onwards.

The 2010 race saw a new circuit configuration being used, using the brand new "Arena" layout. For 2011 a new pit complex was built between Club and Abbey Corners, to where the start/finish line was moved. Silverstone is still a very fast circuit- with average speeds up in the 233 km/h (145 mph) range for Formula 1 cars; one of the highest average speeds on the F1 calendar. In 2017, home hero Lewis Hamilton achieved his first – and as of 2023, only – grand slam at his home race at Silverstone. The 2019 race saw an intense battle against Charles Leclerc and Max Verstappen, which would eventually see Leclerc's teammate Sebastian Vettel join the fray; Vettel locked up, causing him to collide with Verstappen and sending them into the gravel.

=== Silverstone's evolution since 2017 ===
By 2017 Silverstone was losing money. With attendances of 139,000, it lost £2.8m in 2015 and £4.8m in 2016. The key contract had an escalator clause whereby the fee payable to F1 rose from £11.5m in 2010 to £16.2m in 2017, and would have been £25m in 2026. On 11 July 2017, the BRDC, the owners of Silverstone, activated a break clause in the contract; unless a new contract was signed, 2019 would be the last Silverstone British Grand Prix. However, on the Wednesday before the British GP of 2019 started on the Friday morning, a new contract which was not financially crippling was signed between Silverstone and F1's new rights owners Liberty Media, following two years of negotiations; Silverstone was contracted to host the British Grand Prix until at least 2024.

The early audiences of the British GP have been described as "three blokes stood on a grassy knoll and a burger van"; over time the British GP became "almost a motorsport Glastonbury Festival", with music, entertainment, food, facilities far beyond the 90-minute race itself; this has been successful, with the 2026 race reported to be the biggest GP in F1 history.

In 2020, Hamilton brought the car home with a punctured tyre for a seventh British Grand Prix victory. The 2021 instalment would see Hamilton collide with polesitter and championship leader Verstappen at Copse corner, sending the Red Bull driver into the wall at 290 km/h (180 mph). The following year would also see another car collide with the barriers in a major incident; this time with Zhou Guanyu's Alfa Romeo down the start-finish straight following an incident involving Pierre Gasly and George Russell. The race also saw Ferrari's Carlos Sainz Jr. win his first race in his Formula One career.

In September 2022, Silverstone was criticised during the initial sale of tickets for the 2023 British Grand Prix. The track instituted a 'dynamic pricing' model of prices refreshing every 90 seconds based on demand, and then encouraged fans to access its online ticketing system immediately after sales began. The rush of fans led to surges in pricing and crashes to the ticket sales website. Silverstone was forced to suspend sales and apologise to fans.

On 8 February 2024, Silverstone and Formula One extended its contract to host the British Grand Prix until 2034. At the 2024 British Grand Prix, Lewis Hamilton, on his final season driving for Mercedes, won the race for the ninth time. The 104th win of his career, it broke Michael Schumacher's record for most wins at a single circuit.

In the 2025 race McLaren's Lando Norris won his first victory on home soil and McLaren's first at Silverstone since 2008, ahead of teammate Oscar Piastri and Sauber's maiden podium-sitter Nico Hülkenberg.

Over the years Silverstone's attendance increased as it became more oriented towards entertainment in addition to the race itself, with an attendance of 564,000 in 2026, the biggest in Formula One history.

== Venues ==
Venue (in chronological order)	Years
Brooklands	1926–1927
Silverstone	1948–1954
Aintree and Silverstone	1955–1960 (alternating yearly)
Aintree	1961–1962
Silverstone and Brands Hatch	1963–1986 (alternating yearly)
Silverstone	1987–present (contracted until 2034)

== Trophies and awards ==
=== The Royal Automobile Club Trophy ===
Royal Automobile Club Trophy, St James Motor Pageant, London, 2026

Since 1950, it has been customary that the winner of the race is awarded the official RAC British Grand Prix Trophy, a perpetual trophy awarded each year and then returned to the Royal Automobile Club, where it is permanently housed. From 1950 until 1972, the official trophy was the Mervyn O'Gorman Trophy, but this was replaced from 1973 by the present gold cup.

=== Prize money ===
Before the institution of a winner's trophy, the only award for being placed in the British Grand Prix was the prize money on offer. For the first two British Grands Prix held at Brooklands, the prize money was £1,000 to the winner, £300 to the second-placed finisher and £200 for finishing third. For the first post-Second World War British Grand Prix in 1948, prize money was offered to the entrants of the top ten finishers, ranging from £500 to the winner to £20 for tenth place, and the amounts awarded changed little over the next few years, although by 1958 the winner's prize had increased to £750.

A cash prize was also awarded for the fastest lap of the race from 1948, when the prize amounted to £25. By 1953, this prize was no longer offered.

=== Fred G. Craner Memorial Trophy ===
In addition to the official winner's trophy, in 1950 the RAC also awarded for the first time a further perpetual trophy, the Fred G. Craner Memorial Car Trophy, for the highest-placed British competitor driving a British car, which was awarded until at least 1972. Fred Craner had been secretary of the Derby & District Motor Club and instrumental in establishing Donington Park as a motor racing circuit and in organising the Donington Grands Prix. The first winner of this trophy was F R "Bob" Gerard driving an ERA, who finished fifth overall. The first occasion on which the winners of the British Grand Prix also won the Fred G. Craner Memorial Trophy was at Aintree in 1957, when the winners were Stirling Moss and Tony Brooks driving a Vanwall.

=== Chief Mechanic's Award ===
From 1948 until at least 1953, the chief mechanic of the winning car was awarded a prize. From 1948 the prize was the RAC Plaque, but by 1952 this had become a cash prize of £25.

=== Sir Arthur Stanley Cup ===
For the first British Grand Prix in 1926, Sir Arthur Stanley, president of the RAC from 1905 to 1936 presented a cup for the fastest lap of the race, which was won outright by Henry Segrave.

== Winners ==
=== By year ===
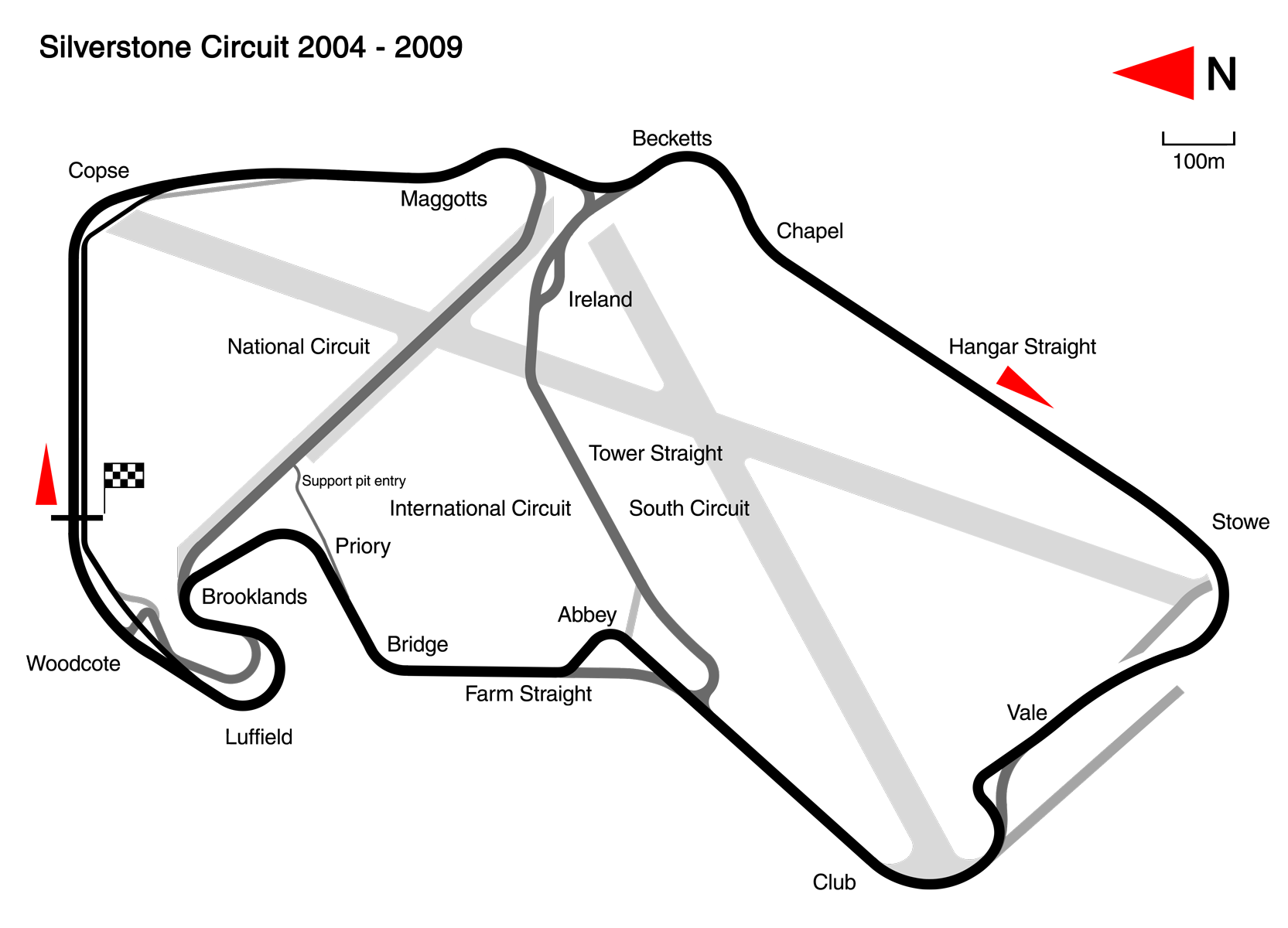
Silverstone (albeit some changes), as used in 1994–2009

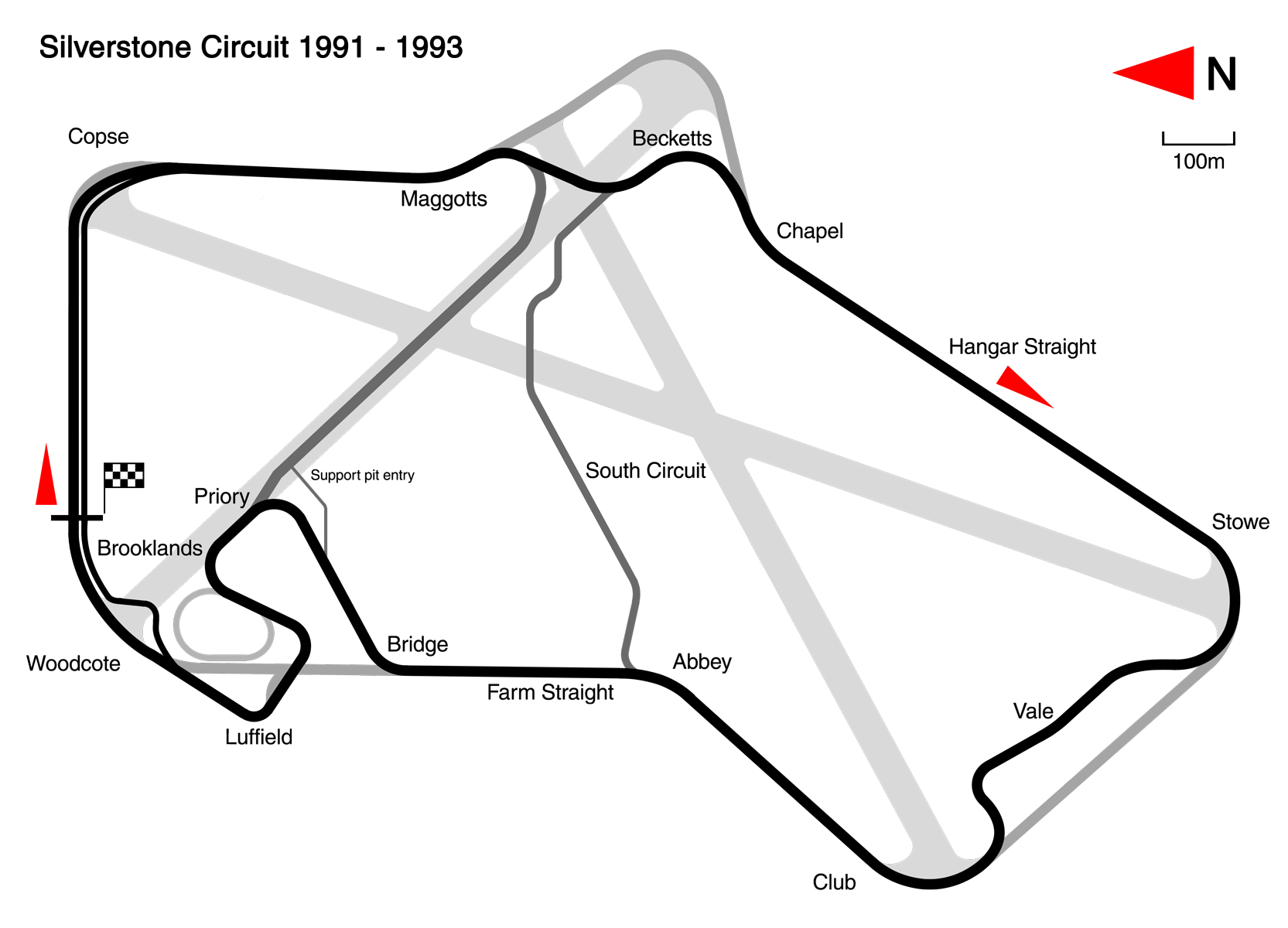
Silverstone, as used in 1991–1993

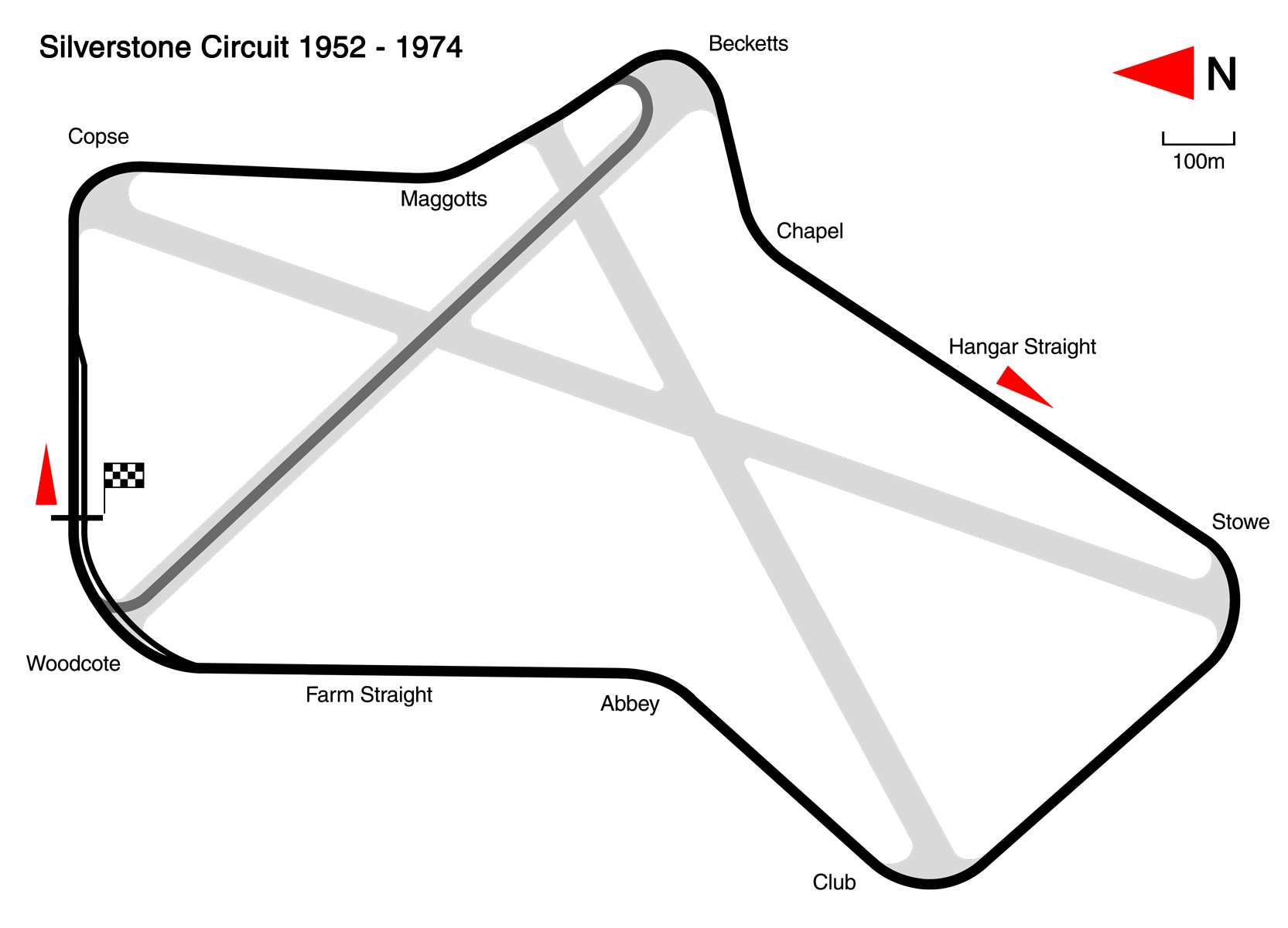
Silverstone, (albeit 3 changes around the Farm Straight and Woodcote) used in 1950–1990

Brands Hatch, alternated with Silverstone in 1964–1986

Aintree, alternated with Silverstone in 1955–1962

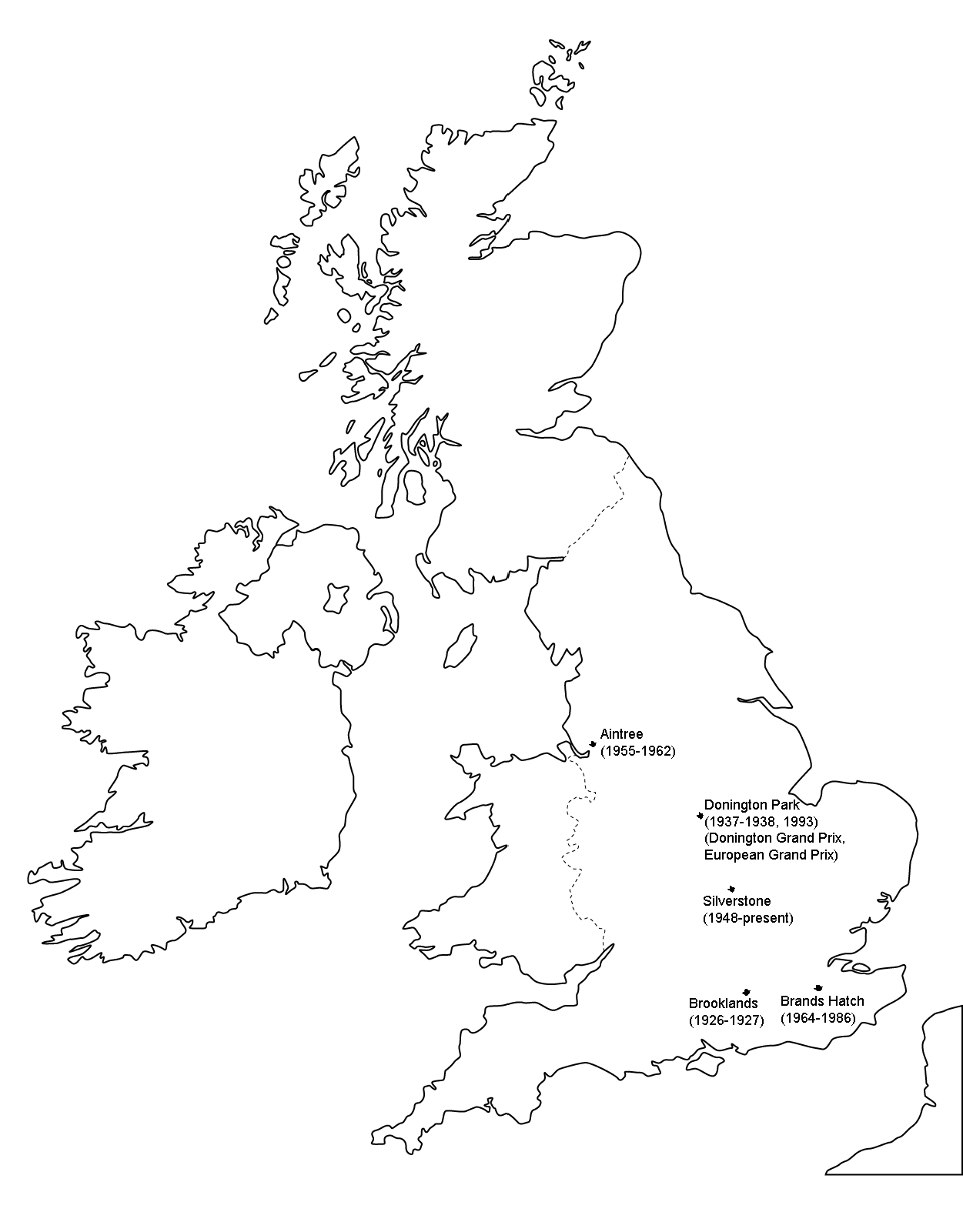
A map of the locations of British circuits that have hosted a Grand Prix.

A green background indicates an event which was part of the AIACR World Manufacturers' Championship.
A pink background indicates an event which was not part of the Formula One World Championship.

Year	Driver	Constructor	Location	Report
1926	(France) Robert Sénéchal (France) Louis Wagner	Delage	Brooklands	Report
1927	(France) Robert Benoist	Delage	Brooklands	Report
1928 – 1947	Not held			
1948	(Italy) Luigi Villoresi	Maserati	Silverstone	Report
1949	(Switzerland) Emmanuel de Graffenried	Maserati	Silverstone	Report
1950	(Italy) Giuseppe Farina	Alfa Romeo	Silverstone	Report
1951	(Argentina) José Froilán González	Ferrari	Silverstone	Report
1952	(Italy) Alberto Ascari	Ferrari	Silverstone	Report
1953	(Italy) Alberto Ascari	Ferrari	Silverstone	Report
1954	(Argentina) José Froilán González	Ferrari	Silverstone	Report
1955	(United Kingdom) Stirling Moss	Mercedes	Aintree	Report
1956	(Argentina) Juan Manuel Fangio	Lancia-Ferrari	Silverstone	Report
1957	(United Kingdom) Stirling Moss (United Kingdom) Tony Brooks	Vanwall	Aintree	Report
1958	(United Kingdom) Peter Collins	Ferrari	Silverstone	Report
1959	(Australia) Jack Brabham	Cooper-Climax	Aintree	Report
1960	(Australia) Jack Brabham	Cooper-Climax	Silverstone	Report
1961	(West Germany) Wolfgang von Trips	Ferrari	Aintree	Report
1962	(United Kingdom) Jim Clark	Lotus-Climax	Aintree	Report
1963	(United Kingdom) Jim Clark	Lotus-Climax	Silverstone	Report
1964	(United Kingdom) Jim Clark	Lotus-Climax	Brands Hatch	Report
1965	(United Kingdom) Jim Clark	Lotus-Climax	Silverstone	Report
1966	(Australia) Jack Brabham	Brabham-Repco	Brands Hatch	Report
1967	(United Kingdom) Jim Clark	Lotus-Ford	Silverstone	Report
1968	(Switzerland) Jo Siffert	Lotus-Ford	Brands Hatch	Report
1969	(United Kingdom) Jackie Stewart	Matra-Ford	Silverstone	Report
1970	(Austria) Jochen Rindt	Lotus-Ford	Brands Hatch	Report
1971	(United Kingdom) Jackie Stewart	Tyrrell-Ford	Silverstone	Report
1972	(Brazil) Emerson Fittipaldi	Lotus-Ford	Brands Hatch	Report
1973	(United States) Peter Revson	McLaren-Ford	Silverstone	Report
1974	(South Africa) Jody Scheckter	Tyrrell-Ford	Brands Hatch	Report
1975	(Brazil) Emerson Fittipaldi	McLaren-Ford	Silverstone	Report
1976	(Austria) Niki Lauda	Ferrari	Brands Hatch	Report
1977	(United Kingdom) James Hunt	McLaren-Ford	Silverstone	Report
1978	(Argentina) Carlos Reutemann	Ferrari	Brands Hatch	Report
1979	(Switzerland) Clay Regazzoni	Williams-Ford	Silverstone	Report
1980	(Australia) Alan Jones	Williams-Ford	Brands Hatch	Report
1981	(United Kingdom) John Watson	McLaren-Ford	Silverstone	Report
1982	(Austria) Niki Lauda	McLaren-Ford	Brands Hatch	Report
1983	(France) Alain Prost	Renault	Silverstone	Report
1984	(Austria) Niki Lauda	McLaren-TAG	Brands Hatch	Report
1985	(France) Alain Prost	McLaren-TAG	Silverstone	Report
1986	(United Kingdom) Nigel Mansell	Williams-Honda	Brands Hatch	Report
1987	(United Kingdom) Nigel Mansell	Williams-Honda	Silverstone	Report
1988	(Brazil) Ayrton Senna	McLaren-Honda	Silverstone	Report
1989	(France) Alain Prost	McLaren-Honda	Silverstone	Report
1990	(France) Alain Prost	Ferrari	Silverstone	Report
1991	(United Kingdom) Nigel Mansell	Williams-Renault	Silverstone	Report
1992	(United Kingdom) Nigel Mansell	Williams-Renault	Silverstone	Report
1993	(France) Alain Prost	Williams-Renault	Silverstone	Report
1994	(United Kingdom) Damon Hill	Williams-Renault	Silverstone	Report
1995	(United Kingdom) Johnny Herbert	Benetton-Renault	Silverstone	Report
1996	(Canada) Jacques Villeneuve	Williams-Renault	Silverstone	Report
1997	(Canada) Jacques Villeneuve	Williams-Renault	Silverstone	Report
1998	(Germany) Michael Schumacher	Ferrari	Silverstone	Report
1999	(United Kingdom) David Coulthard	McLaren-Mercedes	Silverstone	Report
2000	(United Kingdom) David Coulthard	McLaren-Mercedes	Silverstone	Report
2001	(Finland) Mika Häkkinen	McLaren-Mercedes	Silverstone	Report
2002	(Germany) Michael Schumacher	Ferrari	Silverstone	Report
2003	(Brazil) Rubens Barrichello	Ferrari	Silverstone	Report
2004	(Germany) Michael Schumacher	Ferrari	Silverstone	Report
2005	(Colombia) Juan Pablo Montoya	McLaren-Mercedes	Silverstone	Report
2006	(Spain) Fernando Alonso	Renault	Silverstone	Report
2007	(Finland) Kimi Räikkönen	Ferrari	Silverstone	Report
2008	(United Kingdom) Lewis Hamilton	McLaren-Mercedes	Silverstone	Report
2009	(Germany) Sebastian Vettel	Red Bull-Renault	Silverstone	Report
2010	(Australia) Mark Webber	Red Bull-Renault	Silverstone	Report
2011	(Spain) Fernando Alonso	Ferrari	Silverstone	Report
2012	(Australia) Mark Webber	Red Bull-Renault	Silverstone	Report
2013	(Germany) Nico Rosberg	Mercedes	Silverstone	Report
2014	(United Kingdom) Lewis Hamilton	Mercedes	Silverstone	Report
2015	(United Kingdom) Lewis Hamilton	Mercedes	Silverstone	Report
2016	(United Kingdom) Lewis Hamilton	Mercedes	Silverstone	Report
2017	(United Kingdom) Lewis Hamilton	Mercedes	Silverstone	Report
2018	(Germany) Sebastian Vettel	Ferrari	Silverstone	Report
2019	(United Kingdom) Lewis Hamilton	Mercedes	Silverstone	Report
2020	(United Kingdom) Lewis Hamilton	Mercedes	Silverstone	Report
2021	(United Kingdom) Lewis Hamilton	Mercedes	Silverstone	Report
2022	(Spain) Carlos Sainz Jr.	Ferrari	Silverstone	Report
2023	(Netherlands) Max Verstappen	Red Bull-Honda RBPT	Silverstone	Report
2024	(United Kingdom) Lewis Hamilton	Mercedes	Silverstone	Report
2025	(United Kingdom) Lando Norris	McLaren-Mercedes	Silverstone	Report
2026	(Monaco) Charles Leclerc	Ferrari	Silverstone	Report

=== Repeat winners (drivers) ===
Drivers in bold are competing in the Formula One championship in 2026.

Wins	Driver	Years won
9	(United Kingdom) **Lewis Hamilton**	2008, 2014, 2015, 2016, 2017, 2019, 2020, 2021, 2024
5	(United Kingdom) Jim Clark	1962, 1963, 1964, 1965, 1967
5	(France) Alain Prost	1983, 1985, 1989, 1990, 1993
4	(United Kingdom) Nigel Mansell	1986, 1987, 1991, 1992
3	(Australia) Jack Brabham	1959, 1960, 1966
3	(Austria) Niki Lauda	1976, 1982, 1984
3	(Germany) Michael Schumacher	1998, 2002, 2004
2	(Argentina) José Froilán González	1951, 1954
2	(Italy) Alberto Ascari	1952, 1953
2	(United Kingdom) Stirling Moss	1955, 1957
2	(United Kingdom) Jackie Stewart	1969, 1971
2	(Brazil) Emerson Fittipaldi	1972, 1975
2	(Canada) Jacques Villeneuve	1996, 1997
2	(United Kingdom) David Coulthard	1999, 2000
2	(Spain) **Fernando Alonso**	2006, 2011
2	(Germany) Sebastian Vettel	2009, 2018
2	(Australia) Mark Webber	2010, 2012

=== Repeat winners (constructors) ===
Teams in bold are competing in the Formula One championship in 2026.
A green background indicates an event which was part of the pre-war World Manufacturers' Championship.
A pink background indicates an event which was not part of the Formula One World Championship.

Wins	Constructor	Years won
19	(Italy) **Ferrari**	1951, 1952, 1953, 1954, 1956, 1958, 1961, 1976, 1978, 1990, 1998, 2002, 2003, 2004, 2007, 2011, 2018, 2022, 2026
15	(United Kingdom) **McLaren**	1973, 1975, 1977, 1981, 1982, 1984, 1985, 1988, 1989, 1999, 2000, 2001, 2005, 2008, 2025
10	(Germany) **Mercedes**	1955, 2013, 2014, 2015, 2016, 2017, 2019, 2020, 2021, 2024
10	(United Kingdom) **Williams**	1979, 1980, 1986, 1987, 1991, 1992, 1993, 1994, 1996, 1997
8	(United Kingdom) Lotus	1962, 1963, 1964, 1965, 1967, 1968, 1970, 1972
4	(Austria) **Red Bull**	2009, 2010, 2012, 2023
2	(France) Delage	1926, 1927
2	(Italy) Maserati	1948, 1949
2	(United Kingdom) Cooper	1959, 1960
2	(United Kingdom) Tyrrell	1971, 1974
2	(France) Renault	1983, 2006

=== Repeat winners (engine manufacturers) ===
Manufacturers in bold are competing in the Formula One championship in 2026.
A green background indicates an event which was part of the pre-war World Manufacturers' Championship.
A pink background indicates an event which was not part of the Formula One World Championship.

Wins	Manufacturer	Years won
19	(Italy) **Ferrari**	1951, 1952, 1953, 1954, 1956, 1958, 1961, 1976, 1978, 1990, 1998, 2002, 2003, 2004, 2007, 2011, 2018, 2022, 2026
16	(Germany) **Mercedes** **	1955, 1999, 2000, 2001, 2005, 2008, 2013, 2014, 2015, 2016, 2017, 2019, 2020, 2021, 2024, 2025
14	(United States) Ford *	1967, 1968, 1969, 1970, 1971, 1972, 1973, 1974 1975, 1977, 1979, 1980, 1981, 1982
12	(France) Renault	1983, 1991, 1992, 1993, 1994, 1995, 1996, 1997, 2006, 2009, 2010, 2012
6	(United Kingdom) Climax	1959, 1960, 1962, 1963, 1964, 1965
4	(Japan) **Honda**	1986, 1987, 1988, 1989
2	(France) Delage	1926, 1927
2	(Italy) Maserati	1948, 1949
2	(Luxembourg) TAG ***	1984, 1985

* Built by Cosworth, funded by Ford

** Between 1999 and 2005 built by Ilmor, funded by Mercedes

*** Built by Porsche
