= British Grand Prix Trophy =

Motor race trophy

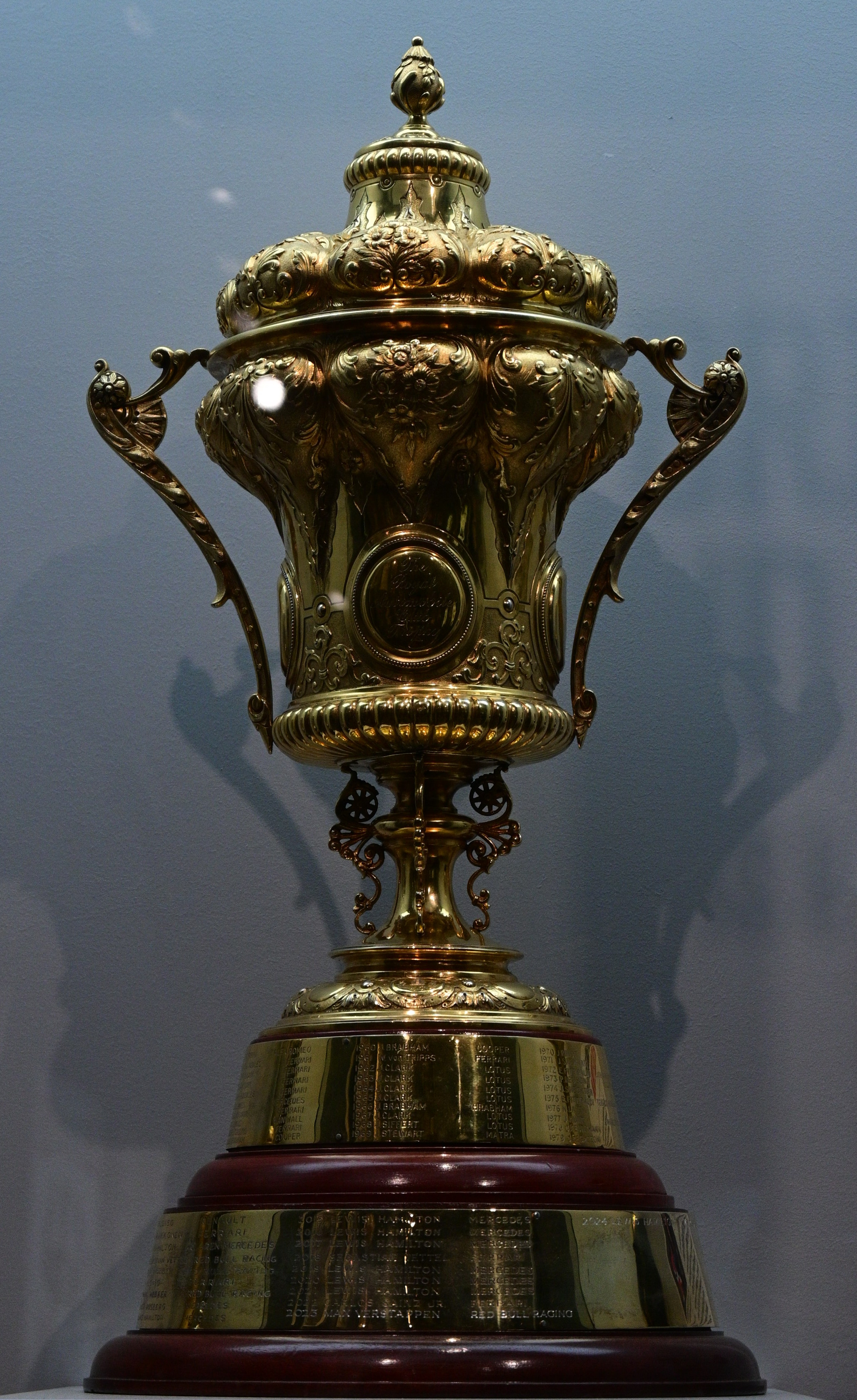
- The Royal Automobile Club Trophy
- Sport: Formula One
- Awarded for: Winning the British Grand Prix
- Location: Silverstone Circuit
- Country: United Kingdom
- Presented by: Royal Automobile Club

History
- First award: 1950
- First winner: (Italy) Giuseppe Farina
- Most wins: (United Kingdom) Lewis Hamilton (9)
- Most recent: (Monaco) Charles Leclerc (2026)
- Website: royalautomobileclub.co.uk

The first British Grand Prix was held in 1926, however it was not until the fifth event, held in 1950, that a trophy was first awarded to the winner. The first trophy presented by the Royal Automobile Club was the Mervyn O'Gorman trophy, awarded from 1950 until the early 1970s, when it was replaced by the present gold Royal Automobile Club Trophy. The official, perpetual trophy is awarded to the winner of the British Grand Prix and then returned to the Royal Automobile Club, where it is permanently housed.

Since 1952, the winner of the British Grand Prix has generally also been awarded a trophy by the principal sponsor of the race (for 1952, the Daily Express), which is won outright each year and replaced by a new trophy for the following year's event. In some years, it is the sponsor's trophy, rather than the official RAC trophy, which is handed to the winner on the podium, which is why post-race photographs since 1950 have shown many more than the two official trophies that have ever been awarded. The winners of international Grands Prix are awarded trophies from countries where the race took place, and by a variety of event sponsors, therefore international trophies may vary hugely in style and colour.

The first trophy was awarded to Giuseppe Farina, whilst Stirling Moss was the first Briton to win. Forty-four drivers have won the British Grand Prix since 1926 (on two occasions with two drivers sharing the winning car), of whom thirty-nine have been recipients of the official winner's trophy. Thirteen of the winners have been British, all having won since 1950 and including the joint victory by Stirling Moss and Tony Brooks in 1957. The current trophy holder is Charles Leclerc.

== The Royal Automobile Club Trophy ==
The present official winner's trophy is a large, ornate trophy, being an example of a Victorian, two-handled cup. It is thinly covered with hallmarked sterling silver leaf. The classical waisted urn-shaped body is decorated with eight lobes to its upper half, each hand engraved with floral designs.

The lower half of the main body has four round, bead bordered insignias, the front-facing one is engraved with the title of the trophy. The cover mirrors the upper body with the eight lobes rising to large stylised types of fruit.

The stem of the trophy is all supported and reinforced by four-wheel and scroll cast brackets, the conventional heraldic engraving indicating Eton College and the Royal Automobile Club. The trophy is mounted on a polished mahogany base with gold plated plinth band engraved with the winners' names from 1948 to 2005 when a second larger base was added to accommodate future names. It is not known why the names of the winners from 1926 and 1927 have been omitted, nor why the winners from 1948 and 1949 are included, even though they never actually received the trophy.

== History ==
The Mervyn O'Gorman trophy was an old Brooklands trophy, last awarded in 1909, which was donated by Mervyn O'Gorman to the RAC in April 1950, following the failure of the Brooklands race track to reopen after the Second World War. The last time this trophy was presented was at the 1972 British Grand Prix at Brands Hatch, with the Royal Automobile Club Trophy first awarded at the 1973 British Grand Prix at Silverstone the following year and was first pictured in the official event programme in 1974.

Little is known of the origins of the present gold trophy and despite much research, the Royal Automobile Club has never been able to establish where it came from. The only clue lies in the motto which displays, 'Floreat Etona' or 'let Eton Flourish', suggesting perhaps that it was donated to the Royal Automobile Club by the late Sir Charles Rolls, co-founder of the Rolls-Royce Motor Company and former pupil of Eton College.

The trophy was originally awarded at the Richmond Horse Show in 1898. The BRDC had it re-engraved, to succeed the Mervyn O'Gorman trophy, which by the 1970s was considered too heavy and cumbersome.

== Other awards ==
=== Prize money ===
Before the institution of a winner's trophy, the only award for being placed in the British Grand Prix was the prize money on offer. For the first two British Grands Prix held at Brooklands, the prize money was £1,000 to the winner, £300 to the second-placed finisher and £200 for finishing third. For the first post-Second World War British Grand Prix in 1948, prize money was awarded to the entrants of the top ten finishers, ranging from £500 to the winner to £20 for tenth place, and the amounts awarded changed little over the next few years, although by 1958 the winner's prize had increased to £750.

=== Fred G. Craner Memorial Trophy ===
In addition to the official winner's trophy, in 1950 the RAC also awarded for the first time a further perpetual trophy, the Fred G. Craner Memorial Car Trophy, for the highest-placed British competitor driving a British car, which was awarded until at least 1972. Fred Craner had been secretary of the Derby & District Motor Club and instrumental in establishing Donington Park as a motor racing circuit and in organising the Donington Grands Prix. The first winner of this trophy was Bob Gerard driving an ERA, who finished fifth overall. The first occasion on which the winners of the British Grand Prix also won the Fred G. Craner Memorial Trophy was at Aintree in 1957, when the winners were Stirling Moss and Tony Brooks driving a Vanwall.
