= 2008 British Grand Prix =

Formula One motor race held in 2008

Coordinates: 52°04′43″N 1°01′01″W

Race 9 of 18 in the 2008 Formula One World Championship
← Previous race	Next race →
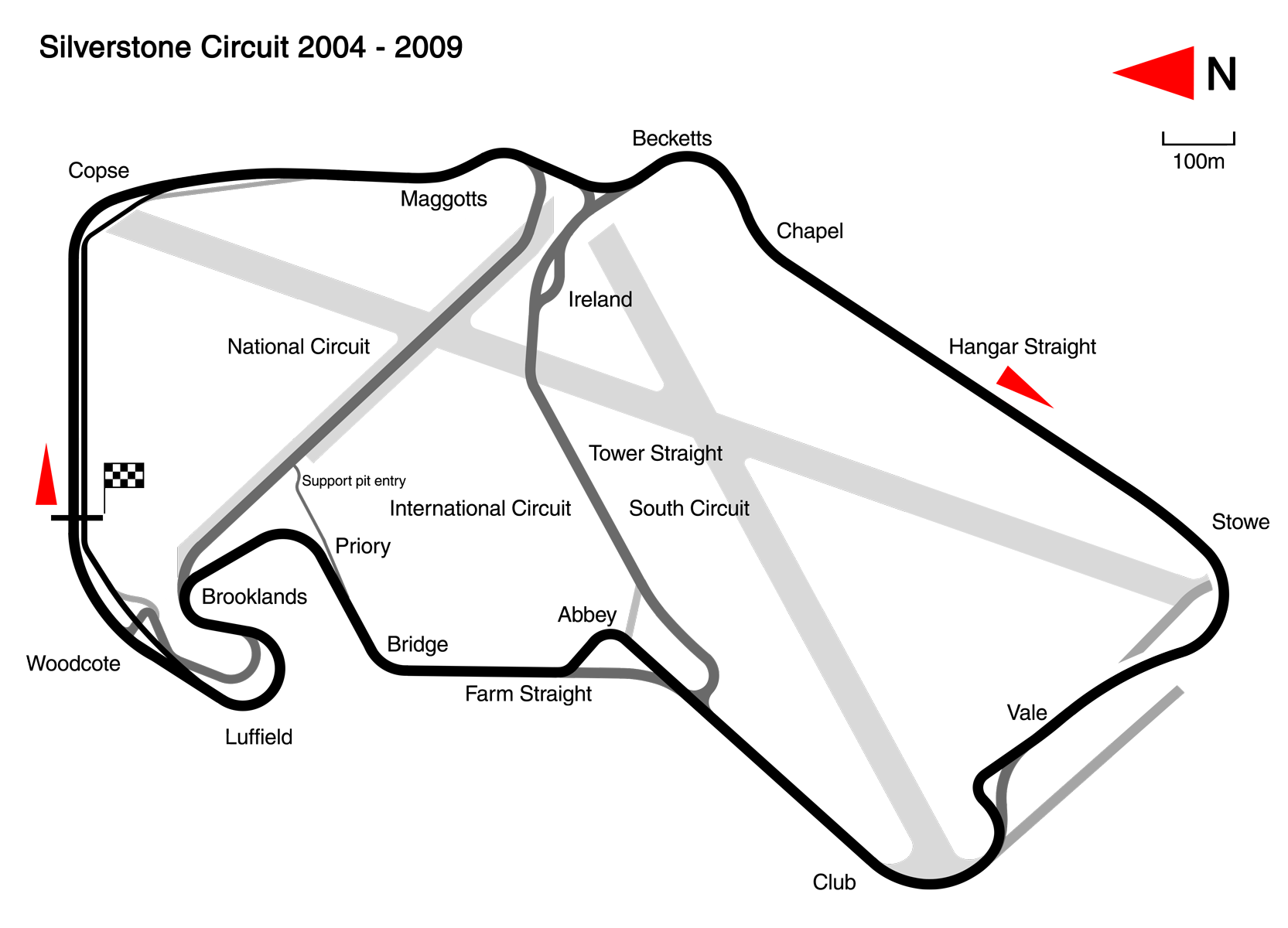

Race details
- Date: 6 July 2008
- Official name: 2008 Formula 1 Santander British Grand Prix
- Location: Silverstone Circuit
- Course: Permanent racing facility
- Course length: 5.141 km (3.194 miles)
- Distance: 60 laps, 308.355 km (191.604 miles)
- Weather: Rain, later drying

Pole position
Driver	(Finland) Heikki Kovalainen	McLaren-Mercedes
- Time: 1:21.049

Fastest lap
Driver	(Finland) Kimi Räikkönen	Ferrari
- Time: 1:32.150 on lap 18

Podium
First	(United Kingdom) Lewis Hamilton	McLaren-Mercedes
Second	(Germany) Nick Heidfeld	BMW Sauber
Third	(Brazil) Rubens Barrichello	Honda

The 2008 British Grand Prix (officially the 2008 Formula 1 Santander British Grand Prix) was a Formula One motor race held on 6 July 2008 at the Silverstone Circuit, Silverstone, England. It was the ninth race of the 2008 Formula One World Championship. The race was held over 60 laps with a practice and qualifying round preceding the race.

Heikki Kovalainen started from pole position alongside Mark Webber in second and Kimi Räikkönen in third on the grid. On the first corner, Lewis Hamilton rose from fourth on the grid to second overtaking Webber and Räikkönen. Hamilton shadowed Kovalainen for the early stages of the race, until he took the lead on lap five. The race was won by Hamilton, racing for McLaren Mercedes ahead of Nick Heidfeld for BMW Sauber in second and Rubens Barrichello third in a Honda. Räikkönen made the fastest lap of the race on lap 18. Hamilton's drive was widely acclaimed as one of Formula One's finest wet-weather drives.

Of the 20 drivers competing, 13 finished the race, with eight receiving world championship points. Hamilton's win tied him for the lead of the Drivers' Championship, alongside Felipe Massa and Räikkönen. In the Constructors Championship, Ferrari's lead was reduced to 14 points over BMW Sauber, with McLaren a further 10 behind.

== Background ==
The 2008 British Grand Prix was held on 6 July 2008 at the Silverstone Circuit, Silverstone, England. The grand prix was contested by 20 drivers, in 10 teams of two. The teams, also known as "constructors", were Scuderia Ferrari, McLaren Mercedes, Renault F1, Honda Racing F1, Force India-Ferrari, BMW Sauber, Toyota F1, Red Bull Racing-Renault, WilliamsF1-Toyota and Scuderia Toro Rosso-Ferrari.

Before the race, Ferrari driver Felipe Massa led the Drivers' Championship with 48 points, BMW driver Robert Kubica trailed by two points, and Massa's teammate Kimi Räikkönen was third on 43 points. McLaren driver Lewis Hamilton was fourth with 38 points, 10 points ahead of Kubica's teammate Nick Heidfeld. In the Constructors' Championship, Ferrari led with 91 points, BMW Sauber were second with 74 points, and McLaren were third with 58 points. Red Bull Renault were in fourth with 24 points, one point ahead of Toyota in fifth. Ferrari were the dominant team prior to the race: their drivers had won five out of eight races, including one-two finishes at the Bahrain, Spanish, and in the previous race, the French Grand Prix. Kubica had performed consistently for BMW Sauber, only failing to score once, and had won his first race four weeks earlier at the Canadian Grand Prix.

There's something about racing in your home country that affects you. The constant support of the crowd gives you a boost throughout the whole weekend. It's not something you experience anywhere else, but it does make you that bit more determined to succeed.

— Lewis Hamilton in the run-up to the British Grand Prix.

Despite wins for Hamilton at the Australian and Monaco Grand Prix, he was facing pressure approaching Silverstone. He had fallen from first to fourth in the Drivers' Championship after failing to score in the previous two races. At the Canadian Grand Prix, he had retired after making contact with a stationary Raikkonen who was waiting at a red light in the pit lane. This led to a ten-place grid penalty for the following race at the Circuit de Nevers Magny-Cours where he failed to score after receiving a drive-through penalty for overtaking Sebastian Vettel by missing a chicane. After the race he responded angrily and to the negative press coverage he had been receiving, saying: "There's nothing you can do that can distract me. You can keep on giving me penalties, whatever you want. I'll keep battling, and trying to come back with a result." However, he remained upbeat about his likelihood of winning the championship and was "confident" going into the weekend.

Three days of testing took place at the Silverstone circuit, from 25 to 27 June. Massa set the fastest time on the first day with a 1:20.188, 0.3 faster than Heikki Kovalainen, but was unable to escape the track after suffering a mechanical failure with 30 minutes to go which forced the session to be red-flagged. Kovalainen improved on the second day to go fastest with a 1:20.015. Strong winds caused Giancarlo Fisichella to crash heavily at Becketts corner; he was uninjured, although medical checks meant he was unable to do further testing in the afternoon. On the third and final day, Hamilton set the quickest time with a 1:19.170, over 0.6 seconds ahead of second-fastest Timo Glock.

Before the race, the FIA announced that Donington Park had been awarded a ten-year contract to host the British Grand Prix from 2010, providing major renovations were completed. The British Racing Drivers' Club, owners of the Silverstone circuit, were disappointed with the announcement stating that development plans for the circuit had been progressing well. They were also critical of the timing of the announcement, being made on the weekend the circuit celebrated its 60th anniversary of hosting the British Grand Prix. Also before the race, Red Bull driver David Coulthard announced he was to retire at the end of the season, saying: "My decision was taken earlier this year and is based on a desire to stop while I am still competitive". He also explained the timing of his retirement saying "the decision to make this announcement at the British Grand Prix should be an obvious one for all to understand, as I have achieved two of my F1 victories at Silverstone and I am a member of the British Racing Drivers' Club, which hosts this event."

== Practice and qualifying ==
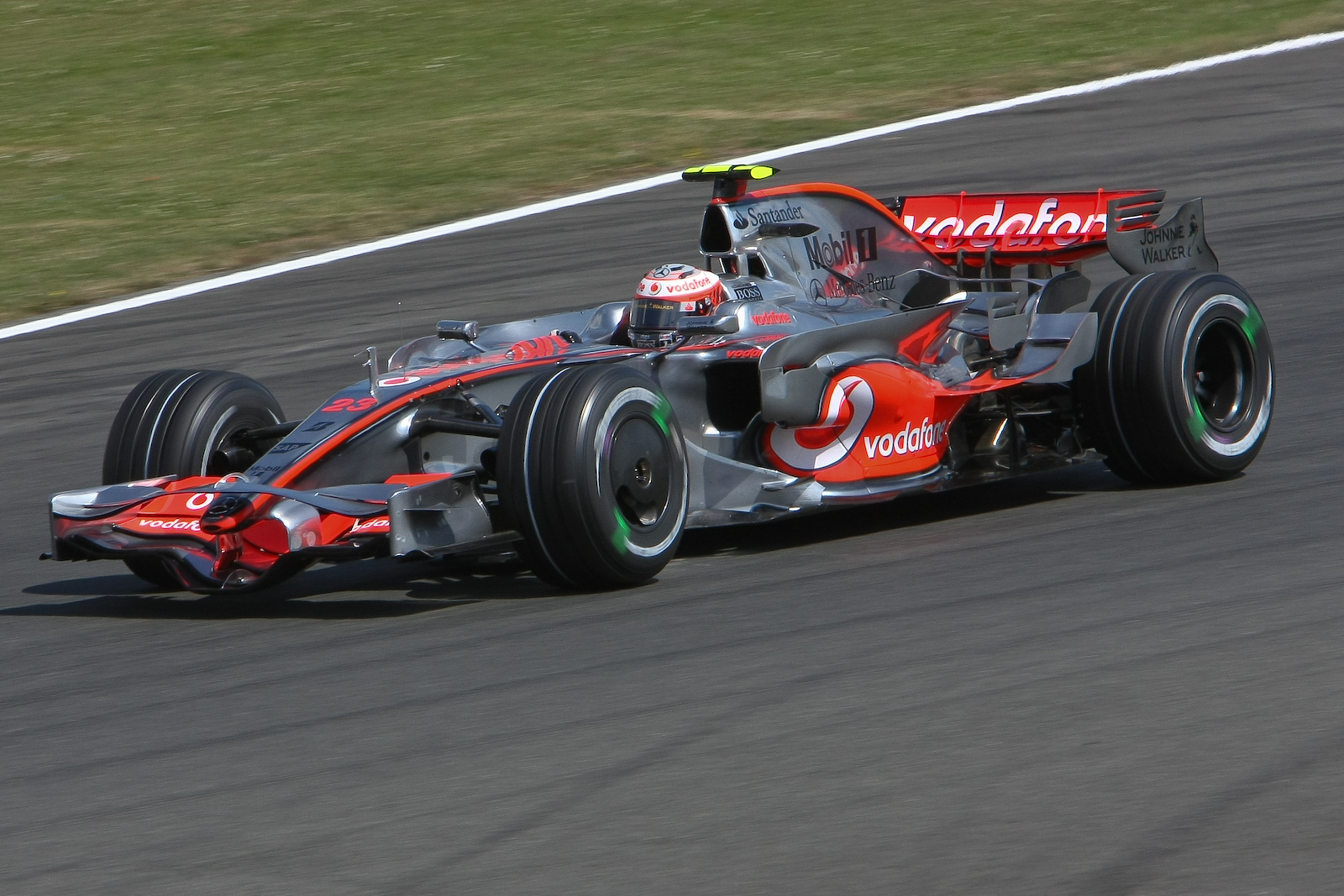
Heikki Kovalainen during Friday practice

Three practice sessions were held before the race held on Sunday. Two of the practice sessions were held on Friday, both lasting 90 minutes; and one on Saturday morning, lasting an hour. Massa was fastest in the first session, with a time of 1:19.575, despite a crash forcing him to miss the last 30 minutes. Fernando Alonso's Renault engine failed, leaving slippery oil on the racing line at Stowe corner. Massa approached the corner and lost control of his car, spinning off the circuit colliding with the barriers. He was unhurt, but his car was too damaged to continue. The session was stopped for 18 minutes to recover his car and cover the oil with cement dust. This left track conditions difficult, and nobody could beat Massa's time in the remainder of the session. It finished with Massa ahead of Kovalainen and Hamilton by less than one-tenth of a second; Raikkonen and Kubica were fourth and fifth-fastest, respectively.

In the second session, Kovalainen was fastest, over half a second ahead of Red Bull driver Mark Webber, Hamilton, and Webber's teammate David Coulthard. Massa missed the first half of the session as his car was still being repaired, and was eighth-fastest. Both Toyota drivers had problems: Timo Glock stopped on the track with a clutch problem; and Jarno Trulli crashed heavily at Stowe after a problem with his rear wing, although he was not hurt. Alonso set the fastest time in the final practice session, which took place in damp conditions following rain earlier in the morning. Early laps were attempted on extreme wet tyres, but the track dried throughout the session, prompting a move to intermediate wet tyres and, with around 20 minutes left, a further switch to dry tyres. Webber finished the session in second place, a quarter of a second slower than Alonso, and Kovalainen was third fastest ahead of Toro Rosso driver Sebastian Vettel.

We've been going really well all weekend after finding some good pace during testing last week. I've spent a lot of time racing in the UK so it feels great to have scored my first ever Formula One pole position at Silverstone. The car feels just fantastic at the moment; I was able to steadily improve throughout all three qualifying session and I'm confident our pace is going to be strong tomorrow.

— Heikki Kovalainen following the third qualifying session.

The qualifying session on Saturday afternoon was split into three rounds. The first lasted 20 minutes and eliminated the cars which finished the session 16th or lower. The second lasted 15 minutes and eliminated cars which finished in positions 11 to 15. The final round of qualifying determined the order of the top ten drivers. Cars which competed in the final session of qualifying were not allowed to refuel before the race, and so they carried more fuel than in the previous sessions.

Kovalainen took his first Formula One pole position with a time of 1:21.049, half a second faster than anyone else. Webber would start alongside him on the front row, the Red Bull team's best qualifying result to date, and Räikkönen would start from third. Hamilton qualified fourth, opting for a more conservative approach to his second flying lap after he had pushed too hard on his first run and slid into the gravel. Nick Heidfeld was fifth quickest for BMW Sauber, ahead of Alonso, Alonso's teammate Nelson Piquet Jr., and Vettel. Championship leader Massa could only qualify ninth after a slow tyre change in the final session left him unable to record a second timed lap.

Kubica did not set a time in the final session due to a technical problem with his car, meaning he started from tenth; the first race all season he had qualified behind teammate Heidfeld. Webber's teammate David Coulthard qualified eleventh for his final British Grand Prix, narrowly missing out on the last part of qualifying, and blamed problems with his car earlier in the day which had reduced his practice time. Sébastien Bourdais was thirteenth splitting the two Toyota cars of Glock and Trulli. Kazuki Nakajima was the slowest of the cars to make the second round of qualifying, and would start the race fifteenth. Both Honda drivers failed to get past the first stage of qualifying, but were ahead of Rosberg in eighteenth, who had suspension problems. Adrian Sutil and Giancarlo Fisichella finished in the last two positions for Force India.

=== Qualifying classification ===
Pos	No	Driver	Constructor	Part 1	Part 2	Part 3	Grid
1	23	(Finland) Heikki Kovalainen	McLaren-Mercedes	1:19.957	1:19.597	1:21.049	1
2	10	(Australia) Mark Webber	Red Bull-Renault	1:20.982	1:19.710	1:21.554	2
3	1	(Finland) Kimi Räikkönen	Ferrari	1:20.370	1:19.971	1:21.706	3
4	22	(United Kingdom) Lewis Hamilton	McLaren-Mercedes	1:20.288	1:19.537	1:21.835	4
5	3	(Germany) Nick Heidfeld	BMW Sauber	1:21.022	1:19.802	1:21.873	5
6	5	(Spain) Fernando Alonso	Renault	1:20.998	1:19.992	1:22.029	6
7	6	(Brazil) Nelson Piquet Jr.	Renault	1:20.818	1:20.115	1:22.491	7
8	15	(Germany) Sebastian Vettel	Toro Rosso-Ferrari	1:20.318	1:20.109	1:23.251	8
9	2	(Brazil) Felipe Massa	Ferrari	1:20.676	1:20.086	1:23.305	9
10	4	(Poland) Robert Kubica	BMW Sauber	1:20.444	1:19.788	No time^{1}	10
11	9	(United Kingdom) David Coulthard	Red Bull-Renault	1:21.224	1:20.174		11
12	12	(Germany) Timo Glock	Toyota	1:20.893	1:20.274		12
13	14	(France) Sébastien Bourdais	Toro Rosso-Ferrari	1:20.584	1:20.531		13
14	11	(Italy) Jarno Trulli	Toyota	1:21.145	1:20.601		14
15	8	(Japan) Kazuki Nakajima	Williams-Toyota	1:21.407	1:21.112		15
16	17	(Brazil) Rubens Barrichello	Honda	1:21.512			16
17	16	(United Kingdom) Jenson Button	Honda	1:21.631			17
18	7	(Germany) Nico Rosberg	Williams-Toyota	1:21.668			18
19	20	(Germany) Adrian Sutil	Force India-Ferrari	1:21.786			19
20	21	(Italy) Giancarlo Fisichella	Force India-Ferrari	1:21.885			20

Notes

- ^1 – Robert Kubica was left without a time in Q3 due to technical problems.

== Race ==
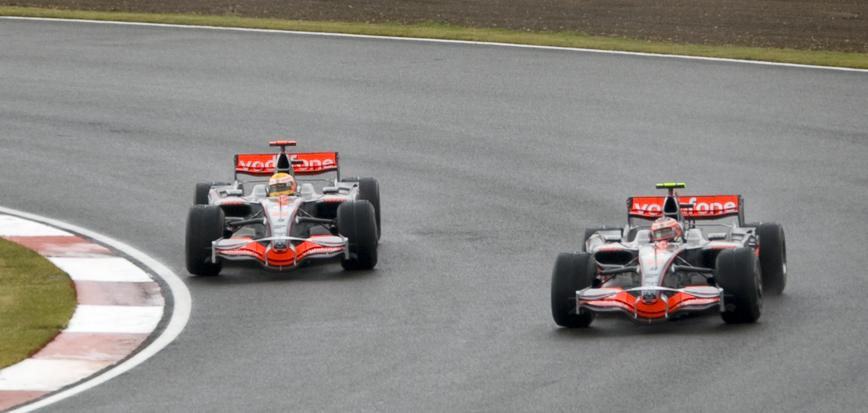
Heikki Kovalainen leads McLaren teammate Lewis Hamilton in the early laps.

There was persistent rain in the morning, leaving standing water on the track, although it had abated by the time the race began. The track temperature was 16 °C (61 °F) and the air temperature was 15 °C (59 °F). All drivers chose to start on the intermediate wet tyres. Rosberg started from the pit lane after a number of set-up changes.

The front three drivers (Kovalainen, Webber and Räikkönen) all struggled for grip off the start, allowing Hamilton to edge ahead into the first corner. Kovalainen who had the better line, however, retook the lead after brushing tyres with Hamilton, who tucked in behind his teammate. A number of drivers struggled with the standing water on the first lap: Webber spun coming onto the Hangar straight, falling from fourth to last place; Massa spun going into Bridge, where he was passed by everyone except Webber; and Coulthard and Vettel ended up in a gravel trap after a collision, forcing them both to retire and bringing out the safety car, which was deployed for one lap and pulled off into pit-lane on lap two.

Alonso showed good early pace, passing Piquet and Heidfeld on laps two and three respectively, and setting the fastest time of any driver on laps four and five. Massa spun for the second time during his third lap, dropping him to the back of the field. Hamilton shadowed Kovalainen closely for several laps, and passed him going into Stowe on lap five. Hamilton quickly extended his lead over Kovalainen, and there was already a six-second gap by the tenth lap when Kovalainen spun and was passed by Räikkönen. However, as the track dried, Räikkönen showed the better pace—particularly in the last two sectors—and the gap was under a second by the time they both pitted on lap 21.

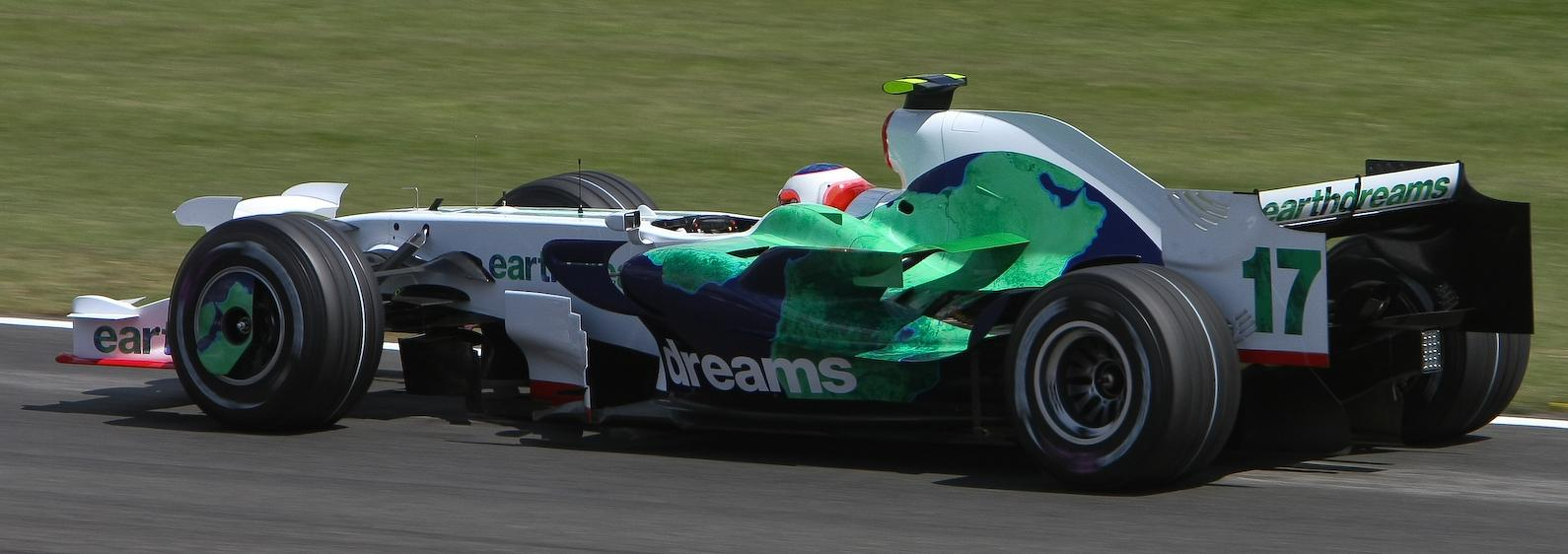
Rubens Barrichello took Honda's first podium finish since 2006.

McLaren gave Hamilton a new set of intermediate wet tyres; in contrast, Ferrari gambled that the track would continue to dry and refuelled Räikkönen without changing his tyres. Despite his pit stop being longer by half a second, Hamilton exited just in front of Räikkönen (Heidfeld briefly took the lead until his pitstop the following lap). McLaren were vindicated in their decision almost immediately: the rain returned and Räikkönen was unable to find grip, falling back from Hamilton by up to eight seconds a lap. By lap 27, Kovalainen and Heidfeld had caught the struggling Räikkönen. As Kovalainen overtook Räikkönen, Heidfeld passed them both to take second place. On the same lap, Fisichella spun out and retired; his Force India teammate Sutil had already retired after a spin on lap 11. After being passed by Kubica and Piquet, Räikkönen finally pitted for fresh tyres on lap 30, dropping him to eleventh place.

Kubica overtook Kovalainen for third place, shortly before Kovalainen pitted for the second time. Despite the rain getting heavier he opted for a new set of intermediate tyres. Both Kubica and Glock left the track and rejoined; however Glock lost a place to his teammate Trulli. On lap 37, both Hondas elected to change onto the extreme wet-weather tyres, Button queuing behind his teammate in the pitlane while waiting to be serviced. Nelson Piquet Jr. spun off the track and beached his car in a gravel trap, ending his race, while in separate incidents within a few moments of each other Hamilton, Kubica, and Massa all lost control of their cars and travelled over the grass before rejoining the track, without any damage. Räikkönen also spun off on the same lap again rejoining the circuit without damaging the car. Hamilton, leading the race by around 30 seconds, made a pitstop to change tyres and take on fuel on lap 38, opting for a new set of the intermediate wet-weather tyres, as the weather forecast predicted the rain would ease. Second-placed driver Heidfeld pitted the following lap, opting for the same tyre choice as Hamilton. The gap between the two leaders was 36 seconds. Kimi Räikkönen spun off in his Ferrari for the second time in as many laps, again though he avoided contact with the barriers and was able to rejoin the track.

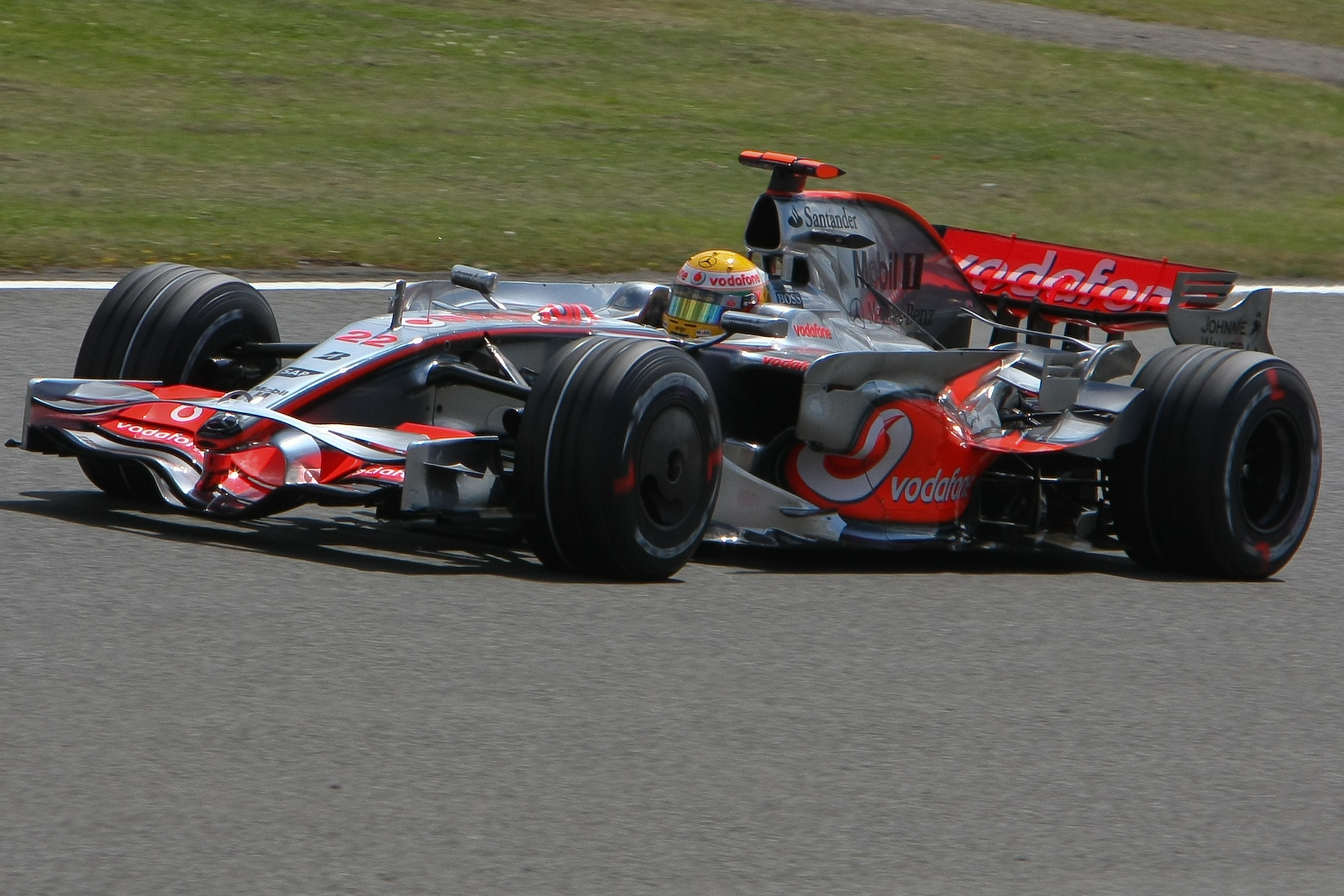
Lewis Hamilton won the race by over a minute from second-place Nick Heidfeld.

With 20 laps of the race remaining, Rubens Barrichello on the extreme wet weather tyres was around nine seconds a lap quicker than the majority of the field and quickly moved his way up to fourth place by passing Kovalainen and Alonso. Robert Kubica retired from the race after losing control of his car and ending up beached in a gravel trap. Nico Rosberg ran into the back of eighth-placed Timo Glock as he attempted to overtake. The collision damaged Rosberg's front wing, and he was forced to make a pit-stop to change it. By now the rain had stopped, but the track surface was still wet. Barrichello caught and passed Trulli and Heidfeld for second place, however a refuelling problem at his earlier pit stop meant that he would need to stop again. He built up a twenty-second gap over Heidfeld before making his pit stop on lap 47, opting to change to the intermediate wet weather tyres. He rejoined in third place, behind Heidfeld. Kovalainen passed Alonso for fifth place at the Bridge corner. Trulli then pitted, promoting Kovalainen to fourth. Felipe Massa spun on the exit of Woodcote corner, managing to recover without any damage. A few moments later Mark Webber made a similar error at the same location. The following lap saw a spin from Kovalainen, which allowed Alonso and Räikkönen to get past while he recovered to the circuit.

Massa, the last car on the road still running in 13th position, spun for the fifth time during the race. He continued without any damage, and made a pit stop the following lap for new tyres and fuel. The final few laps saw a battle for fourth place, as first Räikkönen and then Kovalainen passed Alonso. Hamilton crossed the finish line on lap 60 to win the Grand Prix by 68 seconds from Nick Heidfeld in second. The margin of victory was the largest since the 1995 Australian Grand Prix. Rubens Barrichello finished in third position for Honda's best finish of the 2008 season. Kimi Räikkönen finished in fourth ahead of Kovalainen and Alonso. Räikkönen had also set the fastest lap in the early stages of the race, the sixth consecutive race in which he had done so. Jarno Trulli finished in seventh position, and Kazuki Nakajima finished the race in eighth.

=== Race classification ===
Pos	No	Driver	Constructor	Laps	Time/Retired	Grid	Points
1	22	(United Kingdom) Lewis Hamilton	McLaren-Mercedes	60	1:39:09.440	4	10
2	3	(Germany) Nick Heidfeld	BMW Sauber	60	+1:08.577	5	8
3	17	(Brazil) Rubens Barrichello	Honda	60	+1:22.273	16	6
4	1	(Finland) Kimi Räikkönen	Ferrari	59	+1 Lap	3	5
5	23	(Finland) Heikki Kovalainen	McLaren-Mercedes	59	+1 Lap	1	4
6	5	(Spain) Fernando Alonso	Renault	59	+1 Lap	6	3
7	11	(Italy) Jarno Trulli	Toyota	59	+1 Lap	14	2
8	8	(Japan) Kazuki Nakajima	Williams-Toyota	59	+1 Lap	15	1
9	7	(Germany) Nico Rosberg	Williams-Toyota	59	+1 Lap	PL^{2}	
10	10	(Australia) Mark Webber	Red Bull-Renault	59	+1 Lap	2	
11	14	(France) Sébastien Bourdais	Toro Rosso-Ferrari	59	+1 Lap	13	
12	12	(Germany) Timo Glock	Toyota	59	+1 Lap	12	
13	2	(Brazil) Felipe Massa	Ferrari	58	+2 Laps	9	
Ret	4	(Poland) Robert Kubica	BMW Sauber	39	Spun off	10	
Ret	16	(United Kingdom) Jenson Button	Honda	38	Spun off	17	
Ret	6	(Brazil) Nelson Piquet Jr.	Renault	35	Spun off	7	
Ret	21	(Italy) Giancarlo Fisichella	Force India-Ferrari	26	Spun off	19	
Ret	20	(Germany) Adrian Sutil	Force India-Ferrari	10	Spun off	18	
Ret	15	(Germany) Sebastian Vettel	Toro Rosso-Ferrari	0	Collision	8	
Ret	9	(United Kingdom) David Coulthard	Red Bull-Renault	0	Collision	11	

Notes

- ^2 – Nico Rosberg started the race from the pit lane.

== Post-race ==
It is definitely and by far the best victory I've ever had. It was one of the toughest races I have ever done. I was thinking out there if I win it, it will be the best race I have ever done, not just because of the home crowd. On the last laps I could see the crowd starting standing up, and I was praying, praying 'just finish'. You can imagine the emotions going on inside and I wanted to get it around.

— Lewis Hamilton, speaking after the race.

The top three finishers appeared on the podium to receive trophies and took part in the subsequent press conference. Hamilton commented on the difficult conditions, comparing them to the 2007 Japanese Grand Prix, and the limited visibility: "I couldn't see through my visor, so through turn one and two I had to clean visor, put it up and back down again. I had to do that on every lap especially when it was rained. I couldn't see anything. It was so extreme, so tough, a real mental challenge." He also thanked the fans for their support.

Heidfeld said it was vital to make the correct tyre decisions, and also spoke about the challenging weather: "The most difficult moments in the race were when cars were overtaking me who had been lapped, but were just on better tyres for the conditions at that time. There was so much water and I couldn't see where it was lying." Barrichello, who took his first podium since the 2005 United States Grand Prix, described it as a "perfect race". He said that after he switched to extreme wet tyres, he was "passing people from inside to outside, it was just magic".

After the race, Hamilton tied with Massa and Räikkönen for the lead of the Drivers' Championship all on 48 points. Kubica dropped behind Räikkönen and Hamilton but remained two points behind the championship leaders, with Heidfeld remaining fifth. In the Constructors' Championship, BMW reduced Ferrari's lead to 14 points. McLaren made up six points on BMW, although they were still 10 points behind.

== Championship standings after the race ==
Drivers' Championship standings

	Pos.	Driver	Points
3	1	(United Kingdom) Lewis Hamilton	48
1	2	(Brazil) Felipe Massa	48
	3	(Finland) Kimi Räikkönen	48
2	4	(Poland) Robert Kubica	46
	5	(Germany) Nick Heidfeld	36

Constructors' Championship standings

	Pos.	Constructor	Points
	1	(Italy) Ferrari	96
	2	(Germany) BMW Sauber	82
	3	(United Kingdom) McLaren-Mercedes	72
1	4	(Japan) Toyota	25
1	5	(Austria) Red Bull-Renault	24

- Note: Only the top five positions are included for both sets of standings.

== See also ==
- 2008 Silverstone GP2 Series round

Previous race: 2008 French Grand Prix	FIA Formula One World Championship; 2008 season	Next race: 2008 German Grand Prix
Previous race: 2007 British Grand Prix	British Grand Prix	Next race: 2009 British Grand Prix
