= List of Formula One drivers who set a fastest lap =

Formula One, abbreviated to F1, is the highest class of open-wheeled auto racing defined by the Fédération Internationale de l'Automobile (FIA), motorsport's world governing body. The "formula" in the name refers to a set of rules to which all participants and cars must conform. The F1 World Championship season consists of a series of races, known as Grands Prix, held usually on purpose-built circuits, and in a few cases on closed city streets. Drivers are awarded points based on their position at the end of each race, and the driver who accumulates the most points over each calendar year is crowned that year's World Champion. At each Grand Prix, the driver who completes the quickest lap of the circuit is said to have completed the fastest lap. The driver who set the fastest lap in a Grand Prix was awarded a point from the 1950 season to 1959. The point was reintroduced in the 2019 season, (Note: Only drivers who finished in the top ten were eligible to receive the point.) but was discontinued by the FIA at the conclusion of the 2024 season. As of the 2026 Las Vegas Grand Prix, 142 different drivers have set a fastest lap in a Formula One Grand Prix.

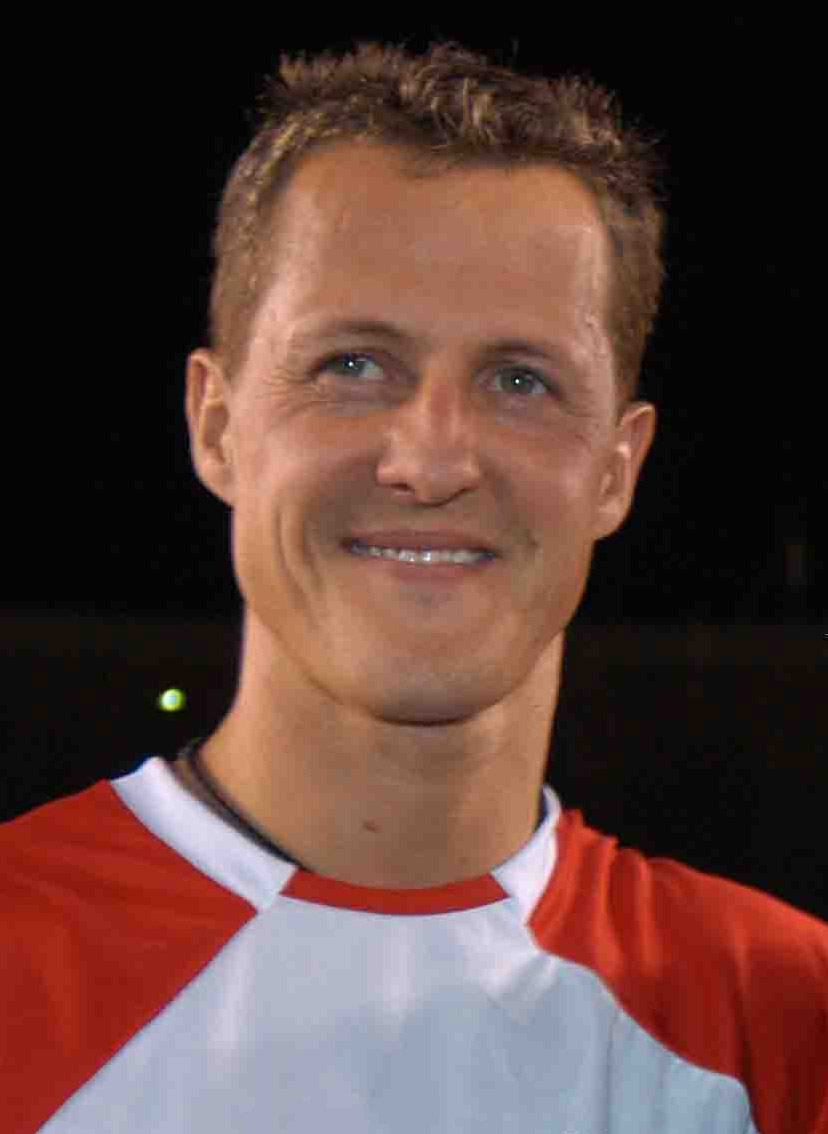
Michael Schumacher holds the record for the most fastest laps with 77 during his career.

Michael Schumacher holds the record for the highest total of fastest laps with 77. Lewis Hamilton is second with 70, while Kimi Räikkönen is third with 46. Gerhard Berger has the most fastest laps among non-world champions, with 21. Alberto Ascari holds the record for the most consecutive fastest laps, with seven from the 1952 Belgian Grand Prix to the 1953 Argentine Grand Prix. Schumacher and Räikkönen hold the record for the most fastest laps in one season with 10. Schumacher achieved this during the 2004 season, Räikkönen matched this in the 2005 and 2008 seasons. Hamilton holds the record for the most seasons with at least one fastest lap (18) and for the most consecutive seasons with a fastest lap (16). Hamilton also has the record for fastest laps at most different circuits and Grands Prix (27).

The first fastest lap, at the 1950 British Grand Prix, was set by Giuseppe Farina. The most recent driver to set their first fastest lap is Liam Lawson, who achieved this at the 2026 Las Vegas Grand Prix. Kimi Antonelli is the youngest driver to set a fastest lap; he was 18 years and 225 days old when he set the fastest lap at the 2025 Japanese Grand Prix. Juan Manuel Fangio was the oldest driver to set a fastest lap; he was 46 years old when he set the fastest lap at the 1958 Argentine Grand Prix. No fastest lap was officially classified for the 2021 Belgian Grand Prix. Since 2007, the driver with the most fastest laps in a season is awarded the DHL Fastest Lap Award. The inaugural award was won by Räikkönen.

== By driver ==
Key
*	Driver has competed in the 2026 season
‡	Formula One World Champion
†	Has competed in the 2026 season and is a Formula One World Champion

Formula One drivers who have set a fastest lap
Rank	Driver	Country	Fastest laps	Seasons active	First fastest lap	Last fastest lap
1	Michael Schumacher^{‡}	Germany	77	1991–2006, 2010–2012	1992 Belgian Grand Prix	2012 German Grand Prix
2	Lewis Hamilton^{†}	United Kingdom	70	2007–	2007 Malaysian Grand Prix	2026 Mexico City Grand Prix
3	Kimi Räikkönen^{‡}	Finland	46	2001–2009, 2012–2021	2002 Australian Grand Prix	2018 Austrian Grand Prix
4	Alain Prost^{‡}	France	41	1980–1991, 1993	1981 French Grand Prix	1993 Japanese Grand Prix
5	Sebastian Vettel^{‡}	Germany	38	2007–2022	2009 British Grand Prix	2019 Belgian Grand Prix
5	Max Verstappen^{†}	Netherlands	38	2015–	2016 Brazilian Grand Prix	2026 Bahrain Grand Prix
7	Nigel Mansell^{‡}	United Kingdom	30	1980–1992, 1994–1995	1983 European Grand Prix	1992 Japanese Grand Prix
8	Jim Clark^{‡}	United Kingdom	28	1960–1968	1961 Dutch Grand Prix	1968 South African Grand Prix
9	Fernando Alonso^{†}	Spain	26	2001, 2003–2018, 2021–	2003 Canadian Grand Prix	2024 Austrian Grand Prix
10	Mika Häkkinen^{‡}	Finland	25	1991–2001	1997 Italian Grand Prix	2001 Hungarian Grand Prix
11	Niki Lauda^{‡}	Austria	24	1971–1979, 1982–1985	1974 Spanish Grand Prix	1985 German Grand Prix
12	Juan Manuel Fangio^{‡}	Argentina	23	1950–1951, 1953–1958	1950 Monaco Grand Prix	1958 Argentine Grand Prix
12	Nelson Piquet^{‡}	Brazil	23	1978–1991	1979 United States Grand Prix	1987 Mexican Grand Prix
14	Gerhard Berger	Austria	21	1984–1997	1986 German Grand Prix	1997 German Grand Prix
15	Nico Rosberg^{‡}	Germany	20	2006–2016	2006 Bahrain Grand Prix	2016 Malaysian Grand Prix
15	Lando Norris^{†}	United Kingdom	20	2019–	2020 Austrian Grand Prix	2026 Belgian Grand Prix
17	Stirling Moss	United Kingdom	19	1951–1961	1954 British Grand Prix	1961 Monaco Grand Prix
17	Ayrton Senna^{‡}	Brazil	19	1984–1994	1984 Monaco Grand Prix	1993 European Grand Prix
17	Damon Hill^{‡}	United Kingdom	19	1992–1999	1993 British Grand Prix	1996 Hungarian Grand Prix
17	Mark Webber	Australia	19	2002–2013	2009 Hungarian Grand Prix	2013 Brazilian Grand Prix
17	Valtteri Bottas*	Finland	19	2013–2024, 2026	2014 Russian Grand Prix	2021 Mexico City Grand Prix
22	David Coulthard	United Kingdom	18	1994–2008	1994 German Grand Prix	2002 French Grand Prix
23	Rubens Barrichello	Brazil	17	1993–2011	2000 Australian Grand Prix	2009 Spanish Grand Prix
23	Daniel Ricciardo	Australia	17	2011–2024	2014 Abu Dhabi Grand Prix	2024 Singapore Grand Prix
25	Jackie Stewart^{‡}	United Kingdom	15	1965–1973	1968 German Grand Prix	1973 Italian Grand Prix
25	Clay Regazzoni	Switzerland	15	1970–1980	1970 Austrian Grand Prix	1979 Italian Grand Prix
25	Felipe Massa	Brazil	15	2002, 2004–2017	2006 Spanish Grand Prix	2014 Canadian Grand Prix
25	Charles Leclerc*	Monaco	15	2018–	2019 Bahrain Grand Prix	2026 United States Grand Prix
29	Jacky Ickx	Belgium	14	1967–1979	1969 German Grand Prix	1972 Italian Grand Prix
30	Alan Jones^{‡}	Australia	13	1975–1981, 1983, 1985–1986	1978 United States Grand Prix West	1981 Dutch Grand Prix
30	Riccardo Patrese	Italy	13	1977–1993	1982 Monaco Grand Prix	1992 German Grand Prix
30	George Russell*	United Kingdom	13	2019–	2020 Sakhir Grand Prix	2026 Azerbaijan Grand Prix
33	Alberto Ascari^{‡}	Italy	12	1950–1955	1952 Belgian Grand Prix	1954 Spanish Grand Prix
33	Jack Brabham^{‡}	Australia	12	1955–1970	1959 Monaco Grand Prix	1970 British Grand Prix
33	René Arnoux	France	12	1978–1989	1979 French Grand Prix	1984 Dutch Grand Prix
33	Juan Pablo Montoya	Colombia	12	2001–2006	2001 European Grand Prix	2005 Turkish Grand Prix
33	Sergio Pérez*	Mexico	12	2011–2024, 2026–	2012 Monaco Grand Prix	2024 Belgian Grand Prix
38	Kimi Antonelli†	Italy	11	2025–	2025 Japanese Grand Prix	2026 São Paulo Grand Prix
39	John Surtees^{‡}	United Kingdom	10	1960–1972	1960 Portuguese Grand Prix	1968 Belgian Grand Prix
39	Graham Hill^{‡}	United Kingdom	10	1958–1975	1960 British Grand Prix	1967 United States Grand Prix
39	Mario Andretti^{‡}	United States	10	1968–1972, 1974–1982	1971 South African Grand Prix	1978 Italian Grand Prix
42	Denny Hulme^{‡}	New Zealand	9	1965–1974	1966 Dutch Grand Prix	1974 Belgian Grand Prix
42	Ronnie Peterson	Sweden	9	1970–1978	1973 Spanish Grand Prix	1978 Austrian Grand Prix
42	Jacques Villeneuve^{‡}	Canada	9	1996–2006	1996 Australian Grand Prix	1997 Austrian Grand Prix
42	Oscar Piastri*	Australia	9	2023–	2023 Italian Grand Prix	2025 Qatar Grand Prix
46	James Hunt^{‡}	United Kingdom	8	1973–1979	1973 British Grand Prix	1977 British Grand Prix
46	Gilles Villeneuve	Canada	8	1977–1982	1978 Argentine Grand Prix	1981 San Marino Grand Prix
46	Ralf Schumacher	Germany	8	1997–2007	1999 Italian Grand Prix	2005 Belgian Grand Prix
46	Jenson Button^{‡}	United Kingdom	8	2000–2017	2009 Malaysian Grand Prix	2012 Indian Grand Prix
50	Jacques Laffite	France	7	1974–1986	1976 Japanese Grand Prix	1985 European Grand Prix
51	José Froilán González	Argentina	6	1950, 1957–1960	1952 Italian Grand Prix	1954 Italian Grand Prix
51	Mike Hawthorn^{‡}	United Kingdom	6	1952–1958	1954 British Grand Prix	1958 Portuguese Grand Prix
51	Phil Hill^{‡}	United States	6	1958–1964, 1966	1958 Italian Grand Prix	1961 German Grand Prix
51	Dan Gurney	United States	6	1959–1968, 1970	1963 South African Grand Prix	1967 German Grand Prix
51	Emerson Fittipaldi^{‡}	Brazil	6	1970–1980	1973 Argentine Grand Prix	1975 United States Grand Prix
51	Carlos Reutemann	Argentina	6	1972–1982	1974 South African Grand Prix	1981 Italian Grand Prix
51	Heinz-Harald Frentzen	Germany	6	1994–2003	1997 Australian Grand Prix	1997 European Grand Prix
58	Nino Farina^{‡}	Italy	5	1950–1955	1950 British Grand Prix	1951 Italian Grand Prix
58	José Carlos Pace	Brazil	5	1972–1977	1973 German Grand Prix	1975 South African Grand Prix
58	Jody Scheckter^{‡}	South Africa	5	1972–1980	1974 French Grand Prix	1977 Japanese Grand Prix
58	John Watson	United Kingdom	5	1973–1983, 1985	1977 South African Grand Prix	1983 Detroit Grand Prix
58	Didier Pironi	France	5	1978–1982	1980 British Grand Prix	1982 Canadian Grand Prix
58	Michele Alboreto	Italy	5	1981–1994	1982 Caesars Palace Grand Prix	1988 Italian Grand Prix
64	Jean-Pierre Beltoise	France	4	1967–1974	1968 Spanish Grand Prix	1972 Monaco Grand Prix
64	Jo Siffert	Switzerland	4	1962–1971	1968 British Grand Prix	1971 Austrian Grand Prix
64	Patrick Depailler	France	4	1972, 1974–1980	1974 Swedish Grand Prix	1979 Monaco Grand Prix
64	Jean Alesi	France	4	1989–2001	1991 United States Grand Prix	1996 Monaco Grand Prix
64	Carlos Sainz Jr.*	Spain	4	2015–	2020 Styrian Grand Prix	2024 British Grand Prix
69	Bill Vukovich	United States	3	1951–1955	1952 Indianapolis 500	1955 Indianapolis 500
69	Tony Brooks	United Kingdom	3	1956–1961	1957 Italian Grand Prix	1961 British Grand Prix
69	Bruce McLaren	New Zealand	3	1959–1970	1959 British Grand Prix	1962 Dutch Grand Prix
69	Richie Ginther	United States	3	1960–1967	1961 Monaco Grand Prix	1966 Mexican Grand Prix
69	Chris Amon	New Zealand	3	1963–1976	1970 Belgian Grand Prix	1972 French Grand Prix
69	Jochen Rindt^{‡}	Austria	3	1964–1970	1969 Spanish Grand Prix	1970 Monaco Grand Prix
69	Jean-Pierre Jarier	France	3	1971, 1973–1983	1975 Brazilian Grand Prix	1978 United States Grand Prix
69	Keke Rosberg^{‡}	Finland	3	1978–1986	1985 French Grand Prix	1985 Australian Grand Prix
69	Pierre Gasly*	France	3	2017–	2019 Chinese Grand Prix	2021 Hungarian Grand Prix
69	Kevin Magnussen	Denmark	3	2014–2020, 2022–2024	2018 Singapore Grand Prix	2024 Abu Dhabi Grand Prix
79	Jim Rathmann	United States	2	1950, 1952–1960	1957 Indianapolis 500	1960 Indianapolis 500
79	Lorenzo Bandini	Italy	2	1961–1967	1966 Monaco Grand Prix	1966 French Grand Prix
79	François Cevert	France	2	1970–1973	1971 German Grand Prix	1973 Belgian Grand Prix
79	Jochen Mass	Germany	2	1973–1982	1975 French Grand Prix	1976 Spanish Grand Prix
79	Derek Warwick	United Kingdom	2	1981–1990, 1993	1982 Dutch Grand Prix	1984 Detroit Grand Prix
79	Patrick Tambay	France	2	1977–1979, 1981–1986	1983 Canadian Grand Prix	1984 South African Grand Prix
79	Teo Fabi	Italy	2	1982, 1984–1987	1986 Italian Grand Prix	1987 San Marino Grand Prix
79	Alessandro Nannini	Italy	2	1986–1990	1988 German Grand Prix	1990 San Marino Grand Prix
79	Giancarlo Fisichella	Italy	2	1996–2009	1997 Spanish Grand Prix	2005 Spanish Grand Prix
79	Heikki Kovalainen	Finland	2	2007–2013	2008 Australian Grand Prix	2008 Bahrain Grand Prix
79	Nick Heidfeld	Germany	2	2000–2011	2008 Malaysian Grand Prix	2008 German Grand Prix
79	Nico Hülkenberg*	Germany	2	2010, 2012–2020, 2022–	2012 Singapore Grand Prix	2016 Chinese Grand Prix
79	Zhou Guanyu	China	2	2022–2024	2022 Japanese Grand Prix	2023 Bahrain Grand Prix
92	Johnnie Parsons	United States	1	1950–1958	1950 Indianapolis 500	1950 Indianapolis 500
92	Lee Wallard	United States	1	1950–1951	1951 Indianapolis 500	1951 Indianapolis 500
92	Piero Taruffi	Italy	1	1950–1956	1952 Swiss Grand Prix	1952 Swiss Grand Prix
92	Luigi Villoresi	Italy	1	1950–1956	1953 Dutch Grand Prix	1953 Dutch Grand Prix
92	Jack McGrath	United States	1	1950–1955	1954 Indianapolis 500	1954 Indianapolis 500
92	Hans Herrmann	Germany	1	1953–1955, 1957–1961	1954 French Grand Prix	1954 French Grand Prix
92	Onofre Marimón	Argentina	1	1951, 1953–1954	1954 British Grand Prix	1954 British Grand Prix
92	Jean Behra	France	1	1952–1959	1954 British Grand Prix	1954 British Grand Prix
92	Karl Kling	Germany	1	1954–1955	1954 German Grand Prix	1954 German Grand Prix
92	Roberto Mieres	Argentina	1	1953–1955	1955 Dutch Grand Prix	1955 Dutch Grand Prix
92	Paul Russo	United States	1	1950, 1953–1959	1956 Indianapolis 500	1956 Indianapolis 500
92	Luigi Musso	Italy	1	1953–1958	1957 French Grand Prix	1957 French Grand Prix
92	Tony Bettenhausen	United States	1	1950–1960	1958 Indianapolis 500	1958 Indianapolis 500
92	Johnny Thomson	United States	1	1953–1960	1959 Indianapolis 500	1959 Indianapolis 500
92	Maurice Trintignant	France	1	1950–1964	1959 United States Grand Prix	1959 United States Grand Prix
92	Innes Ireland	United Kingdom	1	1959–1966	1960 Belgian Grand Prix	1960 Belgian Grand Prix
92	Giancarlo Baghetti	Italy	1	1961–1967	1961 Italian Grand Prix	1961 Italian Grand Prix
92	Ludovico Scarfiotti	Italy	1	1963–1968	1966 Italian Grand Prix	1966 Italian Grand Prix
92	Richard Attwood	United Kingdom	1	1964–1965, 1967–1969	1968 Monaco Grand Prix	1968 Monaco Grand Prix
92	Pedro Rodríguez	Mexico	1	1963–1971	1968 French Grand Prix	1968 French Grand Prix
92	Jackie Oliver	United Kingdom	1	1968–1973, 1977	1968 Italian Grand Prix	1968 Italian Grand Prix
92	Henri Pescarolo	France	1	1968, 1970–1974, 1976	1971 Italian Grand Prix	1971 Italian Grand Prix
92	Mike Hailwood	United Kingdom	1	1963–1965, 1971–1974	1972 South African Grand Prix	1972 South African Grand Prix
92	Vittorio Brambilla	Italy	1	1974–1980	1975 Austrian Grand Prix	1975 Austrian Grand Prix
92	Gunnar Nilsson	Sweden	1	1976–1977	1977 Belgian Grand Prix	1977 Belgian Grand Prix
92	Marc Surer	Switzerland	1	1979–1986	1981 Brazilian Grand Prix	1981 Brazilian Grand Prix
92	Brian Henton	United Kingdom	1	1975, 1977, 1981–1982	1982 British Grand Prix	1982 British Grand Prix
92	Andrea de Cesaris	Italy	1	1980–1994	1983 Belgian Grand Prix	1983 Belgian Grand Prix
92	Jonathan Palmer	United Kingdom	1	1983–1989	1989 Canadian Grand Prix	1989 Canadian Grand Prix
92	Maurício Gugelmin	Brazil	1	1988–1992	1989 French Grand Prix	1989 French Grand Prix
92	Satoru Nakajima	Japan	1	1987–1991	1989 Australian Grand Prix	1989 Australian Grand Prix
92	Thierry Boutsen	Belgium	1	1983–1993	1990 German Grand Prix	1990 German Grand Prix
92	Bertrand Gachot	Belgium	1	1989–1992, 1994–1995	1991 Hungarian Grand Prix	1991 Hungarian Grand Prix
92	Roberto Moreno	Brazil	1	1982, 1987, 1989–1992, 1995	1991 Belgian Grand Prix	1991 Belgian Grand Prix
92	Alexander Wurz	Austria	1	1997–2000, 2005, 2007	1998 Argentine Grand Prix	1998 Argentine Grand Prix
92	Eddie Irvine	United Kingdom	1	1993–2002	1999 Canadian Grand Prix	1999 Canadian Grand Prix
92	Pedro de la Rosa	Spain	1	1999–2002, 2005–2006, 2010–2012	2005 Bahrain Grand Prix	2005 Bahrain Grand Prix
92	Jarno Trulli	Italy	1	1997–2011	2009 Bahrain Grand Prix	2009 Bahrain Grand Prix
92	Timo Glock	Germany	1	2004, 2008–2012	2009 European Grand Prix	2009 European Grand Prix
92	Adrian Sutil	Germany	1	2007–2011, 2013–2014	2009 Italian Grand Prix	2009 Italian Grand Prix
92	Vitaly Petrov	Russia	1	2010–2012	2010 Turkish Grand Prix	2010 Turkish Grand Prix
92	Robert Kubica	Poland	1	2006–2010, 2019, 2021	2010 Canadian Grand Prix	2010 Canadian Grand Prix
92	Kamui Kobayashi	Japan	1	2009–2012, 2014	2012 Chinese Grand Prix	2012 Chinese Grand Prix
92	Romain Grosjean	France	1	2009, 2012–2020	2012 Spanish Grand Prix	2012 Spanish Grand Prix
92	Bruno Senna	Brazil	1	2010–2012	2012 Belgian Grand Prix	2012 Belgian Grand Prix
92	Esteban Gutiérrez	Mexico	1	2013–2014, 2016	2013 Spanish Grand Prix	2013 Spanish Grand Prix
92	Daniil Kvyat	Russia	1	2014–2017, 2019–2020	2016 Spanish Grand Prix	2016 Spanish Grand Prix
92	Yuki Tsunoda*	Japan	1	2021–2026	2023 United States Grand Prix	2023 United States Grand Prix
92	Esteban Ocon*	France	1	2016–	2024 United States Grand Prix	2024 United States Grand Prix
92	Alexander Albon*	Thailand	1	2019–	2025 São Paulo Grand Prix	2025 São Paulo Grand Prix
92	Liam Lawson*	New Zealand	1	2023–	2026 Las Vegas Grand Prix	2026 Las Vegas Grand Prix

== By nationality ==
Fastest laps by driver nationality
Rank	Country	Fastest laps	Driver(s)
1	United Kingdom	289	24
2	Germany	159	12
3	Finland	95	5
4	France	92	16
5	Brazil	88	9
6	Australia	70	5
7	Italy	62	17
8	Austria	49	4
9	Netherlands	38	1
10	Argentina	37	5
11	United States	36	12
12	Spain	31	3
13	Switzerland	20	3
14	Canada	17	2
15	Belgium	16	3
15	New Zealand	16	4
17	Monaco	15	1
18	Mexico	14	3
19	Colombia	12	1
20	Sweden	10	2
21	South Africa	5	1
22	Japan	3	3
22	Denmark	3	1
24	Russia	2	2
24	China	2	1
26	Poland	1	1
26	Thailand	1	1

== Most fastest laps per season ==
Key
	Driver has competed in the 2026 season
**Bold**	Won the World Championship in the same year

Highest number of fastest laps per season
Year	Driver(s)	Constructor(s)	F/Laps	Races	Ref.
1950	(Italy) **Nino Farina**	Alfa Romeo	3	7	
1950	(Argentina) Juan Manuel Fangio	Alfa Romeo	3	7	
1951	(Argentina) **Juan Manuel Fangio**	Alfa Romeo	5	8	
1952	(Italy) **Alberto Ascari**	Ferrari	6	8	
1953	(Italy) **Alberto Ascari**	Ferrari	5	9	
1954	(Argentina) **Juan Manuel Fangio**	Maserati, Mercedes	3	9	
1954	(Argentina) José Froilán González	Ferrari	3	9	
1955	(Argentina) **Juan Manuel Fangio**	Mercedes	3	7	
1956	(Argentina) **Juan Manuel Fangio**	Ferrari	4	8	
1957	(United Kingdom) Stirling Moss	Maserati, Vanwall	3	8	
1958	(United Kingdom) **Mike Hawthorn**	Ferrari	5	11	
1959	(United Kingdom) Stirling Moss	Cooper-Climax, BRM	4	9	
1960	(Australia) **Jack Brabham**	Cooper-Climax	3	10	
1961	(United States) **Phil Hill**	Ferrari	2	8	
1961	(United States) Richie Ginther	Ferrari	2	8	
1962	(United Kingdom) **Graham Hill**	BRM	5	9	
1963	(United Kingdom) **Jim Clark**	Lotus-Climax	6	10	
1964	(United Kingdom) Jim Clark	Lotus-Climax	4	10	
1965	(United Kingdom) **Jim Clark**	Lotus-Climax	6	10	
1966	(United Kingdom) John Surtees	Ferrari	3	9	
1967	(United Kingdom) Jim Clark	Lotus-Ford	5	11	
1968	(Switzerland) Jo Siffert	Lotus-Ford	3	12	
1969	(United Kingdom) **Jackie Stewart**	Matra-Ford	5	11	
1970	(Belgium) Jacky Ickx	Ferrari	5	13	
1971	(United Kingdom) **Jackie Stewart**	Tyrrell-Ford	3	11	
1971	(Belgium) Jacky Ickx	Ferrari	3	11	
1972	(United Kingdom) Jackie Stewart	Tyrrell-Ford	4	12	
1973	(Brazil) Emerson Fittipaldi	Lotus-Ford	5	15	
1974	(Switzerland) Clay Regazzoni	Ferrari	3	15	
1974	(Austria) Niki Lauda	Ferrari	3	15	
1975	(Switzerland) Clay Regazzoni	Ferrari	4	14	
1976	(Austria) Niki Lauda	Ferrari	4	16	
1977	(United States) Mario Andretti	Lotus-Ford	4	17	
1978	(Austria) Niki Lauda	Brabham-Alfa Romeo	4	16	
1979	(Canada) Gilles Villeneuve	Ferrari	6	15	
1980	(Australia) **Alan Jones**	Williams-Ford	5	14	
1981	(Australia) Alan Jones	Williams-Ford	5	15	
1982	(France) Alain Prost	Renault	4	16	
1983	(Brazil) **Nelson Piquet**	Brabham-BMW	4	15	
1984	(Austria) **Niki Lauda**	McLaren-TAG	5	16	
1985	(France) **Alain Prost**	McLaren-TAG	5	16	
1986	(Brazil) Nelson Piquet	Williams-Honda	7	16	
1987	(Brazil) **Nelson Piquet**	Williams-Honda	4	16	
1988	(France) Alain Prost	McLaren-Honda	7	16	
1989	(France) **Alain Prost**	McLaren-Honda	5	16	
1990	(Italy) Riccardo Patrese	Williams-Renault	4	16	
1991	(United Kingdom) Nigel Mansell	Williams-Renault	6	16	
1992	(United Kingdom) **Nigel Mansell**	Williams-Renault	8	16	
1993	(France) **Alain Prost**	Williams-Renault	6	16	
1994	(Germany) **Michael Schumacher**	Benetton-Ford	8	16	
1995	(Germany) **Michael Schumacher**	Benetton-Renault	8	17	
1996	(Canada) Jacques Villeneuve	Williams-Renault	6	16	
1997	(Germany) Heinz-Harald Frentzen	Williams-Renault	6	17	
1998	(Finland) **Mika Häkkinen**	McLaren-Mercedes	6	16	
1998	(Germany) Michael Schumacher	Ferrari	6	16	
1999	(Finland) **Mika Häkkinen**	McLaren-Mercedes	6	16	
2000	(Finland) Mika Häkkinen	McLaren-Mercedes	9	17	
2001	(Germany) Ralf Schumacher	Williams-BMW	5	17	
2002	(Germany) **Michael Schumacher**	Ferrari	7	17	
2003	(Germany) **Michael Schumacher**	Ferrari	5	16	
2004	(Germany) **Michael Schumacher**	Ferrari	10	18	
2005	(Finland) Kimi Räikkönen	McLaren-Mercedes	10	19	
2006	(Germany) Michael Schumacher	Ferrari	7	18	
2007	(Finland) **Kimi Räikkönen**	Ferrari	6	17	
2007	(Brazil) Felipe Massa	Ferrari	6	17	
2008	(Finland) Kimi Räikkönen	Ferrari	10	18	
2009	(Germany) Sebastian Vettel	Red Bull-Renault	3	17	
2009	(Australia) Mark Webber	Red Bull-Renault	3	17	
2010	(United Kingdom) Lewis Hamilton	McLaren-Mercedes	5	19	
2010	(Spain) Fernando Alonso	Ferrari	5	19	
2011	(Australia) Mark Webber	Red Bull-Renault	7	19	
2012	(Germany) **Sebastian Vettel**	Red Bull-Renault	6	20	
2013	(Germany) **Sebastian Vettel**	Red Bull-Renault	7	19	
2014	(United Kingdom) **Lewis Hamilton**	Mercedes	7	19	
2015	(United Kingdom) **Lewis Hamilton**	Mercedes	8	19	
2016	(Germany) **Nico Rosberg**	Mercedes	6	21	
2017	(United Kingdom) **Lewis Hamilton**	Mercedes	7	20	
2018	(Finland) Valtteri Bottas	Mercedes	7	21	
2019	(United Kingdom) **Lewis Hamilton**	Mercedes	6	21	
2020	(United Kingdom) **Lewis Hamilton**	Mercedes	6	17	
2021	(United Kingdom) Lewis Hamilton	Mercedes	6	22	
2021	(Netherlands) **Max Verstappen**	Red Bull Racing-Honda	6	22	
2022	(Netherlands) **Max Verstappen**	Red Bull Racing-RBPT	5	22	
2023	(Netherlands) **Max Verstappen**	Red Bull Racing-Honda RBPT	9	22	
2024	(United Kingdom) Lando Norris	McLaren-Mercedes	6	24	
2025	(United Kingdom) **Lando Norris**	McLaren-Mercedes	6	24	
2025	(Australia) Oscar Piastri	McLaren-Mercedes	6	24	
2026	(Italy) **Kimi Antonelli**	Mercedes	8*	21*	

* Season still in progress.

== Record progression ==
Record progression of most Formula One career fastest laps
Driver	Win count	Achieved at
(Italy) Giuseppe Farina	1	1950 British Grand Prix
(Argentina) Juan Manuel Fangio	1	1950 Monaco Grand Prix
(United States) Johnnie Parsons	1	1950 Indianapolis 500
(Italy) Giuseppe Farina	2–3	1950 Swiss Grand Prix
(Argentina) Juan Manuel Fangio	3–9	1950 Italian Grand Prix
(Italy) Alberto Ascari	9–10	1953 German Grand Prix
(Argentina) Juan Manuel Fangio	10–11	1953 Italian Grand Prix
(Italy) Alberto Ascari	11	1954 British Grand Prix
(Argentina) Juan Manuel Fangio	12–23	1954 British Grand Prix
(United Kingdom) Jim Clark	23–28	1967 Monaco Grand Prix
(France) Alain Prost	28–41	1989 San Marino Grand Prix
(Germany) Michael Schumacher	41–77	2000 European Grand Prix

== See also ==
- List of Formula One Grand Prix winners
- List of Formula One polesitters
- List of Formula One sprint winners
- List of Formula One driver records

== Bibliography ==
- Hughes, Mark; Tremayne, David (2002). The Concise Encyclopedia of Formula 1. Parragon. ISBN 0-75258-766-8.
