= Zakspeed 891 =

Formula One Car

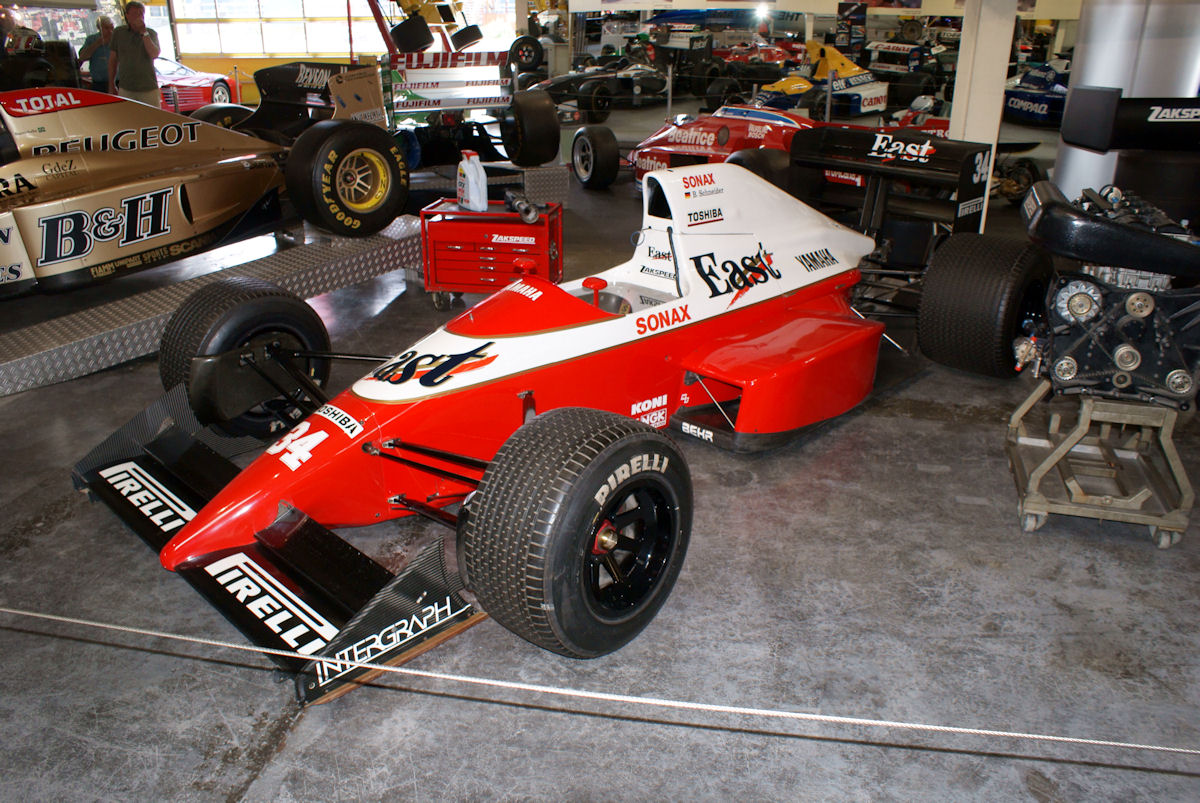
- The 891 of Bernd Schneider at the Technik Museum Sinsheim
- Category: Formula One
- Constructor: Zakspeed
- Designer: Gustav Brunner (Chief Designer)
- Predecessor: 881

Technical specifications
- Chassis: Carbon fibre and Kevlar Monocoque
- Suspension (front): Double wishbones, push-rod operated shock absorbers
- Suspension (rear): Double wishbones, push-rod operated shock absorbers
- Axle track: Front: 1,800 mm (71 in); Rear: 1,650 mm (65 in)
- Wheelbase: 2,820 mm (111 in)
- Engine: Yamaha OX88, 3,498 cc (213.5 cu in), 75° V8, NA, mid-engine, longitudinally mounted
- Transmission: Zakspeed 6-speed manual
- Fuel: Castrol
- Tyres: Pirelli

Competition history
- Notable entrants: West Zakspeed Racing
- Notable drivers: 34. (Germany) Bernd Schneider; 35. (Japan) Aguri Suzuki
- Debut: 1989 Brazilian Grand Prix
- Last event: 1989 Japanese Grand Prix
Races	Wins	Poles	F/Laps
2	0	0	0
- Constructors' Championships: 0
- Drivers' Championships: 0

The Zakspeed 891 was a Formula One car for the 1989 season run by the German Zakspeed team. Its drivers were German Bernd Schneider in his second year with the team and F1 rookie Aguri Suzuki from Japan.

This was the first Formula One car powered by a Yamaha engine.

== Overview ==
Due to neither Schneider nor his 1988 team mate Piercarlo Ghinzani scoring any points in the 881, the team was forced into pre-qualifying in order to be able to try to qualify for a race. While Schneider was able to qualify his car 25th for the 1989 Brazilian Grand Prix, it would prove to be a false hope with the German only able to pre-qualify and qualify once more, at the 1989 Japanese Grand Prix. Suzuki never made it past pre-qualifying at any of the 16 rounds during the season.

Most of this was attributed to what was found to be a very underpowered Yamaha engine. Late in the season following another double failure to pre-qualify at the Spanish Grand Prix, the Yamaha OX88 V8 was reported to be producing only 560 bhp (418 kW; 568 PS). This compared badly to the base 620 bhp (462 kW; 629 PS) of the common Judd V8. It was also unfavorable in comparison to the 650 bhp (485 kW; 659 PS) - 700 bhp (522 kW; 710 PS) bhp of the top four engines, the V10's of Honda (McLaren) and Renault (Williams), the Ferrari V12, and the Cosworth built Ford V8 used by (Benetton). This made Schneider qualifying 21st for the following race in Japan all the more impressive.

The 891 was the last Formula One car to be produced by Zakspeed as the team pulled out of Grand Prix racing following the 1990 season. Yamaha also pulled out of Formula One at the end of 1989, but would later return with the Brabham team in 1991.

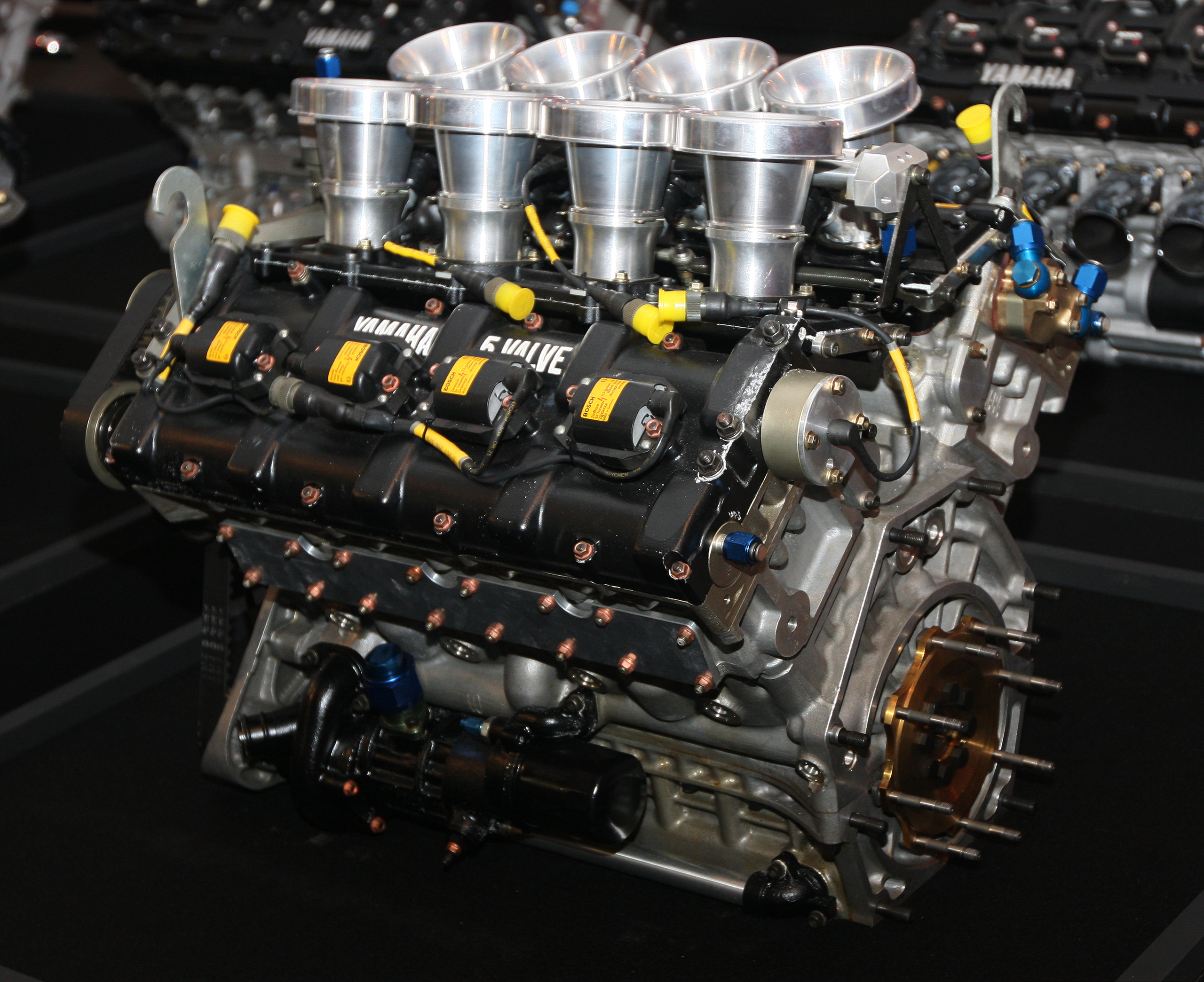
Yamaha's OX88 V8 engine used by Zakspeed in 1989.

== Complete Formula One results ==
(key)

Year	Team	Engine	Tyres	Drivers	1	2	3	4	5	6	7	8	9	10	11	12	13	14	15	16	Pts.	WCC
1989	West Zakspeed Racing	Yamaha OX88; V8	P		BRA	SMR	MON	MEX	USA	CAN	FRA	GBR	GER	HUN	BEL	ITA	POR	ESP	JPN	AUS	0	NC
1989	West Zakspeed Racing	Yamaha OX88; V8	P	Bernd Schneider	Ret	DNPQ	DNPQ	DNPQ	DNPQ	DNPQ	DNPQ	DNPQ	DNPQ	DNPQ	DNPQ	DNPQ	DNPQ	DNPQ	Ret	DNPQ	0	NC
1989	West Zakspeed Racing	Yamaha OX88; V8	P	Aguri Suzuki	DNPQ	DNPQ	DNPQ	DNPQ	DNPQ	DNPQ	DNPQ	DNPQ	DNPQ	DNPQ	DNPQ	DNPQ	DNPQ	DNPQ	DNPQ	DNPQ	0	NC
