= 1989 Brazilian Grand Prix =

- Race 1 of 16 in the 1989 Formula One World Championship
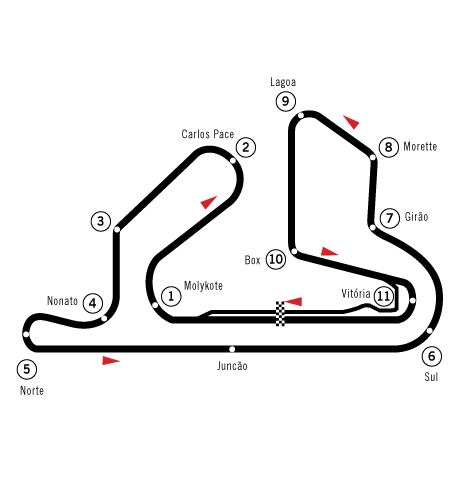

Race details
- Date: 26 March 1989
- Official name: XVIII Grande Prêmio do Brasil
- Location: Autódromo Internacional Nelson Piquet; Jacarepaguá, Rio de Janeiro
- Course: Permanent racing facility
- Course length: 5.031 km (3.126 miles)
- Distance: 61 laps, 306.891 km (190.693 miles)
- Weather: Very hot, dry, sunny

Pole position
Driver	(Brazil) Ayrton Senna	McLaren-Honda
- Time: 1:25.302

Fastest lap
Driver	(Italy) Riccardo Patrese	Williams-Renault
- Time: 1:32.507 on lap 47

Podium
First	(United Kingdom) Nigel Mansell	Ferrari
Second	(France) Alain Prost	McLaren-Honda
Third	(Brazil) Maurício Gugelmin	March-Judd

The 1989 Brazilian Grand Prix was a Formula One motor race held at Jacarepaguá, Rio de Janeiro on 26 March 1989. It was the first race of the 1989 Formula One World Championship.

The 61-lap race was won by Englishman Nigel Mansell, driving for Scuderia Ferrari, with Frenchman Alain Prost second for McLaren-Honda and local driver Maurício Gugelmin third in a March-Judd. It was the first time that a car with a semi-automatic gearbox won the race. Mansell claimed that he had booked an early flight home as he did not expect the new Ferrari 640 (which had severe reliability problems in testing and practice sessions before the race) to complete the distance, and during the podium ceremony he cut his hand whilst lifting the trophy.

== Background ==
The event, officially called the Grande Prêmio do Brasil was held at the Autodromo Nelson Piquet in Baixada de Jacarepaguá in the Brazilian city of Rio de Janeiro and was the first round of the 1989 Formula One World Championship. Free and qualifying practice sessions were held on Friday 24 March and Saturday 25 March, with a warm-up session and the Grand Prix race itself taking place on Sunday 26 March 1989. This was the last Formula One race at Jacarepaguá and in Rio de Janeiro. From 1990, the Brazilian Grand Prix would be held at a shortened Autódromo José Carlos Pace in Interlagos, São Paulo, the home town of Ayrton Senna, where it is today.

Thirty-nine cars were entered for the event by twenty constructors, although Automobiles Gonfaronnaises Sportives (AGS) withdrew one of their entries before the event. Thirteen constructors used Goodyear tyres whilst seven teams used Pirelli tyres. Several teams, including AGS with the JH23B, Benetton Formula with the B188, Scuderia Coloni with the FC 188, EuroBrun with the ER 188B, Larrousse with the Lola LC88B, March Engineering with the 881, Minardi with the M188B, Rial Racing with the ARC2, the Tyrrell Racing Organisation with the 017B, and Williams with the FW12C used versions of their cars from the previous season at this event, featuring varying degrees of modification, some only making minor changes whilst others, such as Eurobrun, Larrousse, and Williams had gone so far as to change engine manufacturer. Williams had one newly-constructed chassis at this race, alongside two 1988 chassis modified to 1989 specifications. Other teams introduced new cars, with Arrows debuting the A11, the returning Brabham debuting the BT58, Scuderia Italia debuting the Dallara F189, Ligier debuting the JS33, Team Lotus debuting the 101, McLaren debuting the MP4/5, debutante Onyx Grand Prix fielding their ORE-1, Osella debuting the FA1-M89, and Zakspeed debuting the 891. Scuderia Ferrari introduced the Ferrari 640 at this race, the first Formula One car with a semi-automatic gearbox.

Williams driver Riccardo Patrese made a then record-breaking 177th appearance at a Grand Prix. This race saw the Grand Prix debuts of British driver Johnny Herbert (in a Benetton) and French driver Olivier Grouillard (in a Ligier). Herbert competed with a sore ankle that caused him to limp due to injuries sustained in a Formula 3000 crash in August 1988.

== Qualifying ==
=== Pre-qualifying report ===
Several teams were required to participate in the Friday morning pre-qualifying sessions during 1989, in order to reduce the field to thirty cars for the main qualifying sessions on Friday afternoon and Saturday. At the midway point of the season, the pre-qualifying group was to be reassessed, with the more successful, points-scoring teams being allowed to avoid pre-qualifying, and unsuccessful teams being required to pre-qualify from mid-season onwards.

At this first Grand Prix of 1989 in Brazil, five cars were allowed to progress. The AGS team had expanded from one car to two, and their first car, to be driven by Philippe Streiff, was not required to pre-qualify. However, the Frenchman had been paralysed in a midweek testing crash at the circuit, which ended his career. He was not replaced for the Grand Prix weekend, allowing an extra car to progress from the pre-qualifying session, the only time during the pre-qualifying sessions from 1988 to 1992 that five cars would be allowed to partake in the main qualifying session instead of the standard four.

The FIRST team withdrew before the event, as the car had failed a mandatory FIA pre-season crash test. This left thirteen cars participating in the session. They included the two Brabhams, as the team had not participated in 1988, and the new Onyx team with their two-car entry. Also included were the two Zakspeeds and the two Osellas. This left five other cars: the sole single-car entry from EuroBrun, and the second cars of the four teams expanding from one car to two for 1989, namely AGS, Coloni, Dallara and Rial.

During the session, the two Brabhams of Martin Brundle and Stefano Modena were considerably faster than the other entrants, securing a comfortable 1–2. Third was the EuroBrun driven by debutant Swiss driver Gregor Foitek, and fourth was the Osella of Nicola Larini. The fortunate fifth fastest runner, who also went through to qualifying on this occasion, was Zakspeed's Bernd Schneider.

Missing out in sixth was Alex Caffi in the Dallara, ahead of veteran Piercarlo Ghinzani in the other Osella. Another newcomer, German driver Volker Weidler was eighth in the Rial, with Pierre-Henri Raphanel's Coloni ninth, ahead of Joachim Winkelhock, also competing in Formula One for the first time, in the AGS. Eleventh was the second Zakspeed of Aguri Suzuki, with the Onyx drivers a little way adrift at the bottom of the time sheets, having had little time to test their new car. Stefan Johansson was faster than his Belgian team-mate Bertrand Gachot, the other driver in the session to make his Formula One debut, but was still over seven seconds slower than Brundle's time.

=== Pre-qualifying classification ===
Pos	No	Driver	Constructor	Time	Gap
1	7	(United Kingdom) Martin Brundle	Brabham-Judd	1:27.764	
2	8	(Italy) Stefano Modena	Brabham-Judd	1:28.147	+0.383
3	33	(Switzerland) Gregor Foitek	EuroBrun-Judd	1:29.604	+1.840
4	17	(Italy) Nicola Larini	Osella-Ford	1:29.679	+1.915
5	34	(West Germany) Bernd Schneider	Zakspeed-Yamaha	1:30.417	+2.653
6	21	(Italy) Alex Caffi	Dallara-Ford	1:30.747	+2.983
7	18	(Italy) Piercarlo Ghinzani	Osella-Ford	1:31.150	+3.386
8	39	(West Germany) Volker Weidler	Rial-Ford	1:31.964	+4.200
9	32	(France) Pierre-Henri Raphanel	Coloni-Ford	1:32.019	+4.255
10	41	(West Germany) Joachim Winkelhock	AGS-Ford	1:32.982	+5.218
11	35	(Japan) Aguri Suzuki	Zakspeed-Yamaha	1:33.079	+5.315
12	36	(Sweden) Stefan Johansson	Onyx-Ford	1:35.232	+7.468
13	37	(Belgium) Bertrand Gachot	Onyx-Ford	1:37.932	+10.168

=== Qualifying report ===
Ayrton Senna took pole position in qualifying ahead of Patrese and Ferrari's Gerhard Berger. For Patrese it was actually his first front row start since he started second at the 1983 European Grand Prix at Brands Hatch, a gap of 81 races. On his debut for Ferrari, Berger's teammate Nigel Mansell qualified sixth. Temperatures during Saturday's qualifying practice session were around 41 °C (105 °F). Benetton driver Herbert and Ligier driver Grouillard both qualified for their first Formula One races.

=== Qualifying classification ===
Pos	No	Driver	Team	Q1	Q2	Gap
1	1	(Brazil) Ayrton Senna	McLaren-Honda	1:26.205	1:25.302	
2	6	(Italy) Riccardo Patrese	Williams-Renault	1:26.172	7:12.732	+0.870
3	28	(Austria) Gerhard Berger	Ferrari	1:26.271	1:26.394	+0.969
4	5	(Belgium) Thierry Boutsen	Williams-Renault	1:27.367	1:26.459	+1.157
5	2	(France) Alain Prost	McLaren-Honda	1:27.095	1:26.620	+1.318
6	27	(United Kingdom) Nigel Mansell	Ferrari	1:27.249	1:26.772	+1.470
7	16	(Italy) Ivan Capelli	March-Judd	1:27.525	1:27.035	+1.733
8	9	(United Kingdom) Derek Warwick	Arrows-Ford	1:27.937	1:27.408	+2.106
9	11	(Brazil) Nelson Piquet	Lotus-Judd	1:28.423	1:27.437	+2.135
10	20	(United Kingdom) Johnny Herbert	Benetton-Ford	1:27.626	1:27.754	+2.324
11	19	(Italy) Alessandro Nannini	Benetton-Ford	1:28.394	1:27.865	+2.563
12	15	(Brazil) Maurício Gugelmin	March-Judd	1:27.956	1:28.581	+2.654
13	7	(United Kingdom) Martin Brundle	Brabham-Judd	1:29.138	1:28.274	+2.972
14	8	(Italy) Stefano Modena	Brabham-Judd	1:28.621	1:28.942	+3.319
15	22	(Italy) Andrea de Cesaris	Dallara-Ford	1:29.005	1:29.206	+3.703
16	23	(Italy) Pierluigi Martini	Minardi-Ford	1:30.077	1:29.435	+4.133
17	38	(Germany) Christian Danner	Rial-Ford	1:30.460	1:29.455	+4.153
18	3	(United Kingdom) Jonathan Palmer	Tyrrell-Ford	1:30.443	1:29.573	+4.271
19	17	(Italy) Nicola Larini	Osella-Ford	1:31.341	1:30.146	+4.844
20	4	(Italy) Michele Alboreto	Tyrrell-Ford	1:32.260	1:30.255	+4.953
21	12	(Japan) Satoru Nakajima	Lotus-Judd	1:30.942	1:30.375	+5.073
22	26	(France) Olivier Grouillard	Ligier-Ford	1:30.410	1:30.666	+5.108
23	24	(Spain) Luis Pérez-Sala	Minardi-Ford	1:30.702	1:30.643	+5.341
24	10	(United States) Eddie Cheever	Arrows-Ford	1:30.657	1:31.068	+5.355
25	34	(Germany) Bernd Schneider	Zakspeed-Yamaha	1:32.346	1:30.861	+5.559
26	30	(France) Philippe Alliot	Lola-Lamborghini	1:31.872	1:31.009	+5.707
27	29	(France) Yannick Dalmas	Lola-Lamborghini	1:32.411	1:31.260	+5.958
28	25	(France) René Arnoux	Ligier-Ford	1:34.232	1:31.376	+6.074
29	33	(Switzerland) Gregor Foitek	EuroBrun-Judd	1:31.791	1:53.570	+6.489
30	31	(Brazil) Roberto Moreno	Coloni-Ford	1:32.561	1:34.894	+7.259

== Race ==
=== Race report ===
The race was due to begin at 13:00 local time. Before the race the temperature was measured at 41 °C (106 °F). At the start, Nicola Larini was disqualified for an illegal start. Mansell became the first man since Mario Andretti in 1971 to win on his Formula One debut for Ferrari, a feat that was not matched until Kimi Räikkönen won for Ferrari at the 2007 Australian Grand Prix. It was also the first race ever to be won by a car with a semi-automatic gearbox. Mansell cut his hands on the trophy following the race. Mansell had lacked confidence in the new V12-powered Ferrari's reliability, and as such had booked a flight home which was due to depart at 16:30. He was joined on the podium by McLaren's Alain Prost and March's Maurício Gugelmin, making his first and only appearance on the podium. Johnny Herbert, still recovering from his horrifying Formula 3000 crash at Brands Hatch six months earlier, finished 4th on his Formula 1 debut for Benetton, 1.123 seconds behind Gugelmin and 7.748 seconds in front of teammate Alessandro Nannini who finished 6th.

The hard luck of the story of the race was undoubtedly Arrows driver Derek Warwick. After his first tyre stop which lasted 18 seconds (a normal stop for the time was around 6–8 seconds) and dropped him from 3rd to 8th, there was another problem fitting a rear wheel during his second stop for tyres, a problem which Warwick himself compounded by actually stalling the Arrows-Ford as he tried to leave his pit, all of which resulted in a stop of around 25 seconds. He eventually finished in fifth place, less than 18 seconds behind Mansell suggesting that the two long pit stops where he was stationary for almost 30 seconds longer than had the stops been trouble free, may have cost Warwick and Arrows their maiden Grand Prix victory.

Warwick's Arrows teammate Eddie Cheever collapsed after exiting his car following the collision involving the Zakspeed of Bernd Schneider that ended his race. Arrows actually had to modify Cheever's car after he failed the FIA safety check where a driver had five seconds to be able to exit their car. The new Ross Brawn designed Arrows A11 was a tight fit for the tall American and he had trouble fitting into the car before practice. It was also a tight fit for Warwick who pointed out during practice that it was really his and Cheever's own fault as Brawn had continually asked the pair if they were comfortable in the car, to which they both said yes, but as Warwick pointed out sitting in a stationary car in the workshop or pit lane is vastly different to being out on the track with all the bumps and g-forces. Schneider, whose car carried the new Yamaha V8 engine, only got into the race after Philippe Streiff's crash and the FIA had allowed five pre-qualifiers to enter the main field instead of four. Schneider did not qualify for another race until the season's penultimate round in Japan some seven months later. His new teammate Aguri Suzuki ultimately failed to qualify for all 16 rounds of the 1989 season.

=== Race classification ===
Pos	No	Driver	Constructor	Laps	Time/Retired	Grid	Points
1	27	(United Kingdom) Nigel Mansell	Ferrari	61	1:38:58.744	6	9
2	2	(France) Alain Prost	McLaren-Honda	61	+ 7.809	5	6
3	15	(Brazil) Maurício Gugelmin	March-Judd	61	+ 9.370	12	4
4	20	(United Kingdom) Johnny Herbert	Benetton-Ford	61	+ 10.493	10	3
5	9	(United Kingdom) Derek Warwick	Arrows-Ford	61	+ 17.866	8	2
6	19	(Italy) Alessandro Nannini	Benetton-Ford	61	+ 18.241	11	1
7	3	(United Kingdom) Jonathan Palmer	Tyrrell-Ford	60	+ 1 lap	18	
8	12	(Japan) Satoru Nakajima	Lotus-Judd	60	+ 1 lap	21	
9	26	(France) Olivier Grouillard	Ligier-Ford	60	+ 1 lap	22	
10	4	(Italy) Michele Alboreto	Tyrrell-Ford	59	+ 2 laps	20	
11	1	(Brazil) Ayrton Senna	McLaren-Honda	59	+ 2 laps	1	
12	30	(France) Philippe Alliot	Lola-Lamborghini	58	+ 3 laps	26	
13	22	(Italy) Andrea de Cesaris	Dallara-Ford	57	+ 4 laps	15	
14	38	(Germany) Christian Danner	Rial-Ford	56	Gearbox	17	
Ret	6	(Italy) Riccardo Patrese	Williams-Renault	51	Alternator	2	
Ret	10	(United States) Eddie Cheever	Arrows-Ford	37	Collision	24	
Ret	34	(Germany) Bernd Schneider	Zakspeed-Yamaha	36	Collision	25	
Ret	7	(United Kingdom) Martin Brundle	Brabham-Judd	27	Halfshaft	13	
Ret	16	(Italy) Ivan Capelli	March-Judd	22	Suspension	7	
Ret	11	(Brazil) Nelson Piquet	Lotus-Judd	10	Fuel system	9	
DSQ	17	(Italy) Nicola Larini	Osella-Ford	10	Illegal start	19	
Ret	8	(Italy) Stefano Modena	Brabham-Judd	9	Halfshaft	14	
Ret	5	(Belgium) Thierry Boutsen	Williams-Renault	3	Engine	4	
Ret	23	(Italy) Pierluigi Martini	Minardi-Ford	2	Chassis	16	
Ret	28	(Austria) Gerhard Berger	Ferrari	0	Collision	3	
Ret	24	(Spain) Luis Pérez-Sala	Minardi-Ford	0	Collision	23	
DNQ	29	(France) Yannick Dalmas	Lola-Lamborghini				
DNQ	25	(France) René Arnoux	Ligier-Ford				
DNQ	33	(Switzerland) Gregor Foitek	EuroBrun-Judd				
DNQ	31	(Brazil) Roberto Moreno	Coloni-Ford				
DNPQ	21	(Italy) Alex Caffi	Dallara-Ford				
DNPQ	18	(Italy) Piercarlo Ghinzani	Osella-Ford				
DNPQ	39	(Germany) Volker Weidler	Rial-Ford				
DNPQ	32	(France) Pierre-Henri Raphanel	Coloni-Ford				
DNPQ	41	(Germany) Joachim Winkelhock	AGS-Ford				
DNPQ	35	(Japan) Aguri Suzuki	Zakspeed-Yamaha				
DNPQ	36	(Sweden) Stefan Johansson	Onyx-Ford				
DNPQ	37	(Belgium) Bertrand Gachot	Onyx-Ford				

== Championship standings after the race ==
Drivers' Championship standings

Pos	Driver	Points
1	(United Kingdom) Nigel Mansell	9
2	(France) Alain Prost	6
3	(Brazil) Maurício Gugelmin	4
4	(United Kingdom) Johnny Herbert	3
5	(United Kingdom) Derek Warwick	2

Constructors' Championship standings

Pos	Constructor	Points
1	(Italy) Ferrari	9
2	(United Kingdom) McLaren-Honda	6
3	(United Kingdom) March-Judd	4
4	(United Kingdom) Benetton-Ford	4
5	(United Kingdom) Arrows-Ford	2

- Note: Only the top five positions are included for both sets of standings.

Previous race: 1988 Australian Grand Prix	FIA Formula One World Championship; 1989 season	Next race: 1989 San Marino Grand Prix
Previous race: 1988 Brazilian Grand Prix	Brazilian Grand Prix	Next race: 1990 Brazilian Grand Prix
