= List of Formula One World Constructors' Champions =

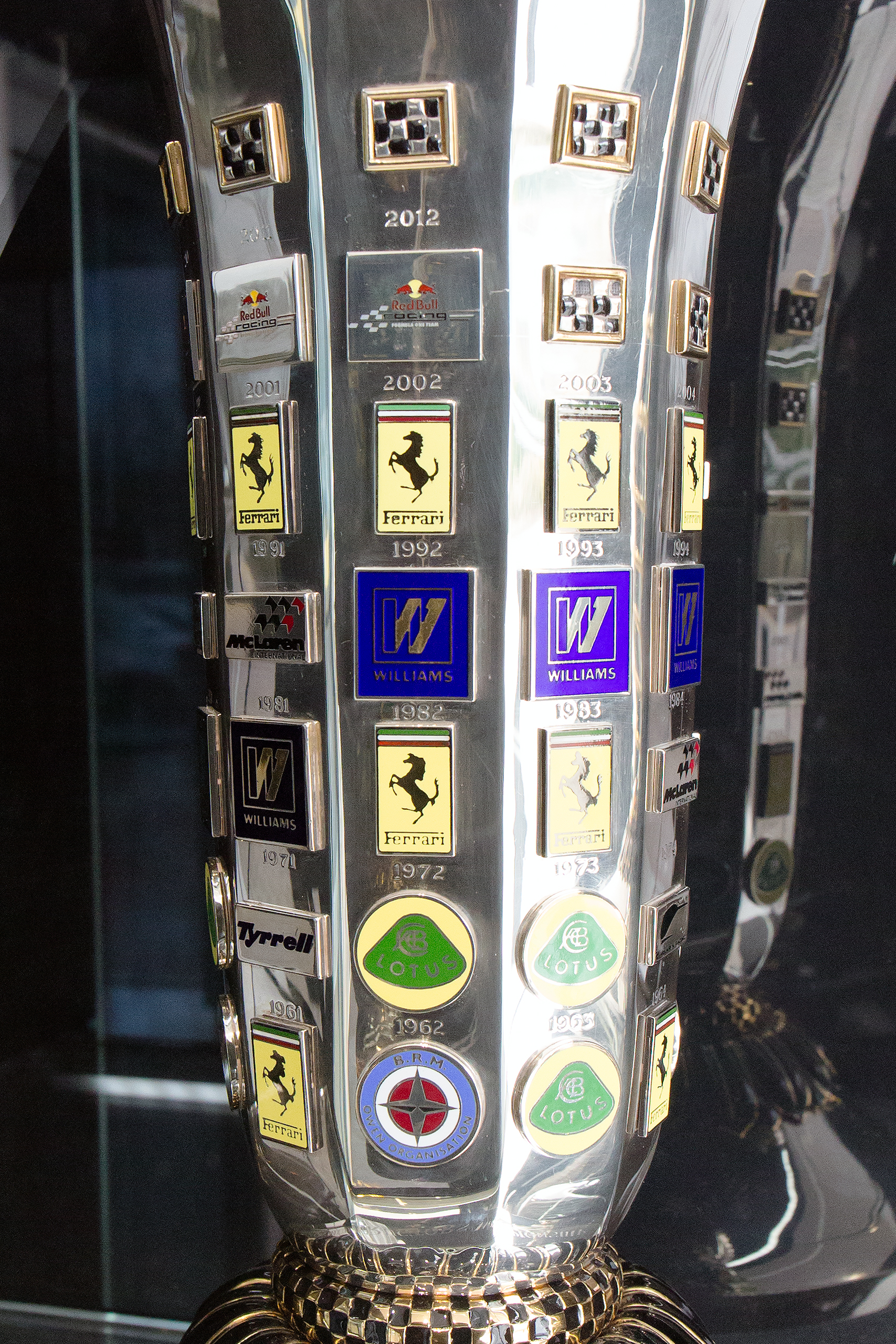
The constructors' trophy, as presented to Red Bull-Renault at the completion of the 2012 season

Formula One (F1) is the highest class of open-wheeled motorsport defined by the Fédération Internationale de l'Automobile (FIA), motorsport's world governing body. The "formula" in the name refers to a set of rules to which all participants and cars must conform. The F1 World Championship season consists of a series of races, known as Grands Prix, held usually on purpose-built circuits, and in a few cases on closed city streets. The World Constructors' Championship is presented by the FIA to the most successful F1 constructor over the course of the season through a points system based on individual Grand Prix results. Constructors' Championship points are calculated by adding points scored in each race by any driver for that constructor. According to FIA regulations, the constructor of a chassis and an engine of a Formula One car is a person or corporate entity that owns the intellectual rights to the chassis and the engine of the car that a team/entrant enters into a competition.

From the inaugural season of the World Constructors' Championship in 1958 up until the 1978 season only the highest-scoring driver in each race for each constructor contributed points towards the World Constructors' Championship (then officially as the International Cup for Formula One Constructors); since the 1979 season points from all cars entered by each constructor have counted towards their championship total. The Constructors' Championship is won when it is no longer mathematically possible for another constructor to overtake another's points total regardless of the outcome of the remaining races, although it is not officially awarded until the FIA Prize Giving Ceremony held in various cities following the conclusion of the season.

The Constructors' Championship was first awarded, as the International Cup for Formula One Manufacturers, in 1958 to Vanwall. In 1981 this name was officially changed to the World Constructors' Championship. The makes of both chassis and an engine are included in the constructor name.

Out of the 170 chassis constructors that have entered an F1 Grand Prix, a total of 15 have won the Championship in its 68 seasons. Ferrari holds the record for the highest number of World Constructors' Championships victories, having won the title on 16 occasions. McLaren are in second position with ten Constructors' Championships. Williams and Mercedes are in joint-third position, both winning nine Constructors' Championships. With 16 titles, Ferrari has amassed the highest number of Constructors' Championships as an engine manufacturer, followed by Mercedes, Renault, Ford and Honda with thirteen, twelve, ten and six titles, respectively. Mercedes holds the record for the most consecutive constructors' titles with eight between the 2014 and the 2021 seasons.

All but 17 titles (16 titles won by Italian-built Ferrari chassis and 1 title won by French-built Matra chassis) have been won by chassis that were designed and constructed in the United Kingdom. On twelve occasions, the World Constructors' Champion team has not contained the World Drivers' Champion for that season. All titles but one (in 1969 Matra cars were entered by Ken Tyrrell's privateer team Matra International) have been won by cars that were entered by works teams. Among drivers that have contributed with at least a single point to the constructors' title, Lewis Hamilton has contributed to the most with eight constructors' titles, all of them with Mercedes.

== By season ==
Key
	Indicates that the Constructor did not field the Drivers' Champion
*	Indicates the Constructor's specific driver that also won the Drivers' Championship
†	Indicates a season in which the International Cup for Formula One Constructors was awarded.

World Constructors' Champions by season
Season	Constructor		Tyre	Drivers (Note: Only drivers who contributed to the final points tally are shown. Car numbers are indicated where the driver kept the same number over the season (replacement drivers' numbers are shown in parentheses).)	Poles	Wins	Podiums	Fastest laps	Points (Note: Only points counted towards the Constructors' Championship are shown.)	% Points	Clinched	Margin (points)	Margin (%)
Season	Chassis	Engine	Tyre	Drivers	Poles	Wins	Podiums	Fastest laps	Points	% Points	Clinched	Margin (points)	Margin (%)
1958†	(United Kingdom) Vanwall	(United Kingdom) Vanwall	D	Stirling Moss; Tony Brooks	5	6	9	3	48	100.00 (71.25)	Race 10 of 11	8	16.66
1959†	(United Kingdom) Cooper	(United Kingdom) Climax	D	Jack Brabham*; Stirling Moss; Bruce McLaren	5	5	13	5	40	100.00 (82.81)	Race 8 of 9	8	20.00
1960†	(United Kingdom) Cooper	(United Kingdom) Climax	D	Jack Brabham*; Bruce McLaren	4	6	14	5	48	100.00 (80.56)	Race 7 of 10	14	29.17
1961†	(Italy) Ferrari	(Italy) Ferrari	D	Phil Hill*; Wolfgang von Trips	6	5	14	5	45	100.00 (81.25)	Race 5 of 8	10	22.22
1962†	(United Kingdom) BRM	(United Kingdom) BRM	D	Graham Hill*	1	4	8	3	42	93.33 (69.14)	Race 9 of 9	6	14.29
1963†	(United Kingdom) Lotus	(United Kingdom) Climax	D	Jim Clark*	7	7	9	6	54	100.00 (82.22)	Race 7 of 10	18	33.33
1964†	(Italy) Ferrari	(Italy) Ferrari	D	John Surtees*; Lorenzo Bandini	2	3	10	2	45	83.33 (54.44)	Race 10 of 10	3	6.67
1965†	(United Kingdom) Lotus	(United Kingdom) Climax	D	Jim Clark*	6	6	7	6	54	100.00 (64.44)	Race 7 of 10	9	16.67
1966†	(United Kingdom) Brabham	(Australia) Repco	G	Jack Brabham*	3	4	9	2	42	93.33 (60.49)	Race 8 of 9	11	26.19
1967†	(United Kingdom) Brabham	(Australia) Repco	G	Denny Hulme*; Jack Brabham	2	4	14	2	63	77.78 (67.68)	Race 8 of 11	19	30.16
1968†	(United Kingdom) Lotus	(United States) Ford	F	Graham Hill*; Jo Siffert; Jim Clark; Jackie Oliver	5	5	9	5	62	68.89 (57.41)	Race 12 of 12	13	20.97
1969†	(France) Matra	(United States) Ford	D	Jackie Stewart*; Jean-Pierre Beltoise	2	6	10	6	66	81.48 (66.67)	Race 8 of 11	17	25.72
1970†	(United Kingdom) Lotus	(United States) Ford	F	Jochen Rindt*; Emerson Fittipaldi; Graham Hill; John Miles	3	6	7	1	59	59.60 (50.43)	Race 12 of 13	7	11.86
1971†	(United Kingdom) Tyrrell	(United States) Ford	G	Jackie Stewart*; François Cevert	6	7	11	4	73	90.12 (73.74)	Race 9 of 11	37	50.68
1972†	(United Kingdom) Lotus	(United States) Ford	F	Emerson Fittipaldi*	3	5	8	4	61	67.78 (56.48)	Race 10 of 12	10	19.39
1973†	(United Kingdom) Lotus	(United States) Ford	G	1. Emerson Fittipaldi; 2. Ronnie Peterson	10	7	15	7	92	78.63 (71.11)	Race 15 of 15	10	10.87
1974†	(United Kingdom) McLaren	(United States) Ford	G	5. Emerson Fittipaldi*; 6. Denny Hulme; 33. Mike Hailwood; (33). David Hobbs (33). Jochen Mass	2	4	10	1	73	62.39 (55.56)	Race 15 of 15	8	10.96
1975†	(Italy) Ferrari	(Italy) Ferrari	G	11. Clay Regazzoni; 12. Niki Lauda*	9	6	11	6	72.5	67.13 (61.97)	Race 13 of 14	18.5	25.52
1976†	(Italy) Ferrari	(Italy) Ferrari	G	1. Niki Lauda; 2. Clay Regazzoni	4	6	13	7	83	65.87 (57.64)	Race 15 of 16	9	10.84
1977†	(Italy) Ferrari	(Italy) Ferrari	G	11. Niki Lauda*; 12. Carlos Reutemann	2	4	16	3	95	70.37 (63.40)	Race 14 of 17	33	34.73
1978†	(United Kingdom) Lotus	(United States) Ford	G	5. Mario Andretti*; 6. Ronnie Peterson	12	8	14	7	86	68.25 (59.72)	Race 13 of 16	28	32.56
1979†	(Italy) Ferrari	(Italy) Ferrari	M	11. Jody Scheckter*; 12. Gilles Villeneuve	2	6	13	6	113	50.22	Race 13 of 15	38	33.63
1980†	(United Kingdom) Williams	(United States) Ford	G	27. Alan Jones*; 28. Carlos Reutemann	3	6	18	5	120	57.14	Race 12 of 14	54	45.00
1981	(United Kingdom) Williams	(United States) Ford	G	1. Alan Jones; 2. Carlos Reutemann	2	4	13	7	95	42.22	Race 14 of 15	34	35.79
1982	(Italy) Ferrari	(Italy) Ferrari	G	27. Gilles Villeneuve; 28. Didier Pironi; (27). Patrick Tambay (28). Mario Andretti	3	3	11	2	74	30.83	Race 16 of 16	5	6.75
1983	(Italy) Ferrari	(Italy) Ferrari	G	27. Patrick Tambay; 28. René Arnoux	8	4	12	3	89	39.56	Race 15 of 15	10	11.24
1984	(United Kingdom) McLaren	(Luxembourg) TAG	M	7. Alain Prost; 8. Niki Lauda*	3	12	18	8	143.5	61.72	Race 13 of 16	86	59.93
1985	(United Kingdom) McLaren	(Luxembourg) TAG	G	1. Niki Lauda; 2. Alain Prost*; (1). John Watson	2	6	12	6	90	37.50	Race 16 of 16	8	8.89
1986	(United Kingdom) Williams	(Japan) Honda	G	5. Nigel Mansell; 6. Nelson Piquet	4	9	19	11	141	58.75	Race 14 of 16	45	31.91
1987	(United Kingdom) Williams	(Japan) Honda	G	5. Nigel Mansell; 6. Nelson Piquet*; (5). Riccardo Patrese	12	9	18	7	137	57.08	Race 13 of 16	61	44.53
1988	(United Kingdom) McLaren	(Japan) Honda	G	11. Alain Prost; 12. Ayrton Senna*	15	15	25	10	199	82.92	Race 11 of 16	134	67.34
1989	(United Kingdom) McLaren	(Japan) Honda	G	1. Ayrton Senna; 2. Alain Prost*	15	10	18	8	141	58.75	Race 12 of 16	64	45.39
1990	(United Kingdom) McLaren	(Japan) Honda	G	27. Ayrton Senna*; 28. Gerhard Berger	12	6	18	5	121	50.42	Race 15 of 16	11	9.10
1991	(United Kingdom) McLaren	(Japan) Honda	G	1. Ayrton Senna*; 2. Gerhard Berger	10	8	18	4	139	56.05	Race 16 of 16	14	10.07
1992	(United Kingdom) Williams	(France) Renault	G	5. Nigel Mansell*; 6. Riccardo Patrese	15	10	21	11	164	64.06	Race 12 of 16	65	39.63
1993	(United Kingdom) Williams	(France) Renault	G	0. Damon Hill; 2. Alain Prost*	15	10	22	10	168	65.63	Race 12 of 16	84	50.00
1994	(United Kingdom) Williams	(France) Renault	G	0. Damon Hill; 2. Ayrton Senna; (2). David Coulthard (2). Nigel Mansell	6	7	13	8	118	46.09	Race 16 of 16	15	12.71
1995	(United Kingdom) Benetton	(France) Renault	G	1. Michael Schumacher*; 2. Johnny Herbert	4	11	15	8	137	50.37	Race 16 of 17	25	18.25
1996	(United Kingdom) Williams	(France) Renault	G	5. Damon Hill*; 6. Jacques Villeneuve	12	12	21	11	175	68.36	Race 12 of 16	105	60.00
1997	(United Kingdom) Williams	(France) Renault	G	3. Jacques Villeneuve*; 4. Heinz-Harald Frentzen	11	8	15	9	123	45.22	Race 16 of 17	21	17.07
1998	(United Kingdom) McLaren	(Germany) Mercedes	B	7. David Coulthard; 8. Mika Häkkinen*	12	9	20	9	156	60.94	Race 16 of 16	23	14.74
1999	(Italy) Ferrari	(Italy) Ferrari	B	3. Michael Schumacher; 4. Eddie Irvine; (3). Mika Salo	3	6	17	6	128	50.00	Race 16 of 16	4	3.13
2000	(Italy) Ferrari	(Italy) Ferrari	B	3. Michael Schumacher*; 4. Rubens Barrichello	10	10	21	5	170	62.50	Race 17 of 17	18	10.59
2001	(Italy) Ferrari	(Italy) Ferrari	B	1. Michael Schumacher*; 2. Rubens Barrichello	11	9	24	3	179	65.81	Race 13 of 17	77	43.02
2002	(Italy) Ferrari	(Italy) Ferrari	B	1. Michael Schumacher*; 2. Rubens Barrichello	10	15	27	12	221	81.25	Race 13 of 17	129	58.37
2003	(Italy) Ferrari	(Italy) Ferrari	B	1. Michael Schumacher*; 2. Rubens Barrichello	8	8	16	8	158	54.86	Race 16 of 16	14	8.86
2004	(Italy) Ferrari	(Italy) Ferrari	B	1. Michael Schumacher*; 2. Rubens Barrichello	12	15	29	14	262	80.86	Race 13 of 18	143	54.58
2005	(France) Renault	(France) Renault	M	5. Fernando Alonso*; 6. Giancarlo Fisichella	7	8	18	3	191	55.85	Race 19 of 19	9	4.71
2006	(France) Renault	(France) Renault	M	1. Fernando Alonso*; 2. Giancarlo Fisichella	7	8	19	5	206	63.58	Race 18 of 18	5	2.43
2007	(Italy) Ferrari	(Italy) Ferrari	B	5. Felipe Massa; 6. Kimi Räikkönen*	11	9	22	11	204	66.67	Race 14 of 17	103	50.49
2008	(Italy) Ferrari	(Italy) Ferrari	B	1. Kimi Räikkönen; 2. Felipe Massa	8	8	19	13	172	53.09	Race 18 of 18	21	12.21
2009	(United Kingdom) Brawn	(Germany) Mercedes	B	22. Jenson Button*; 23. Rubens Barrichello	5	8	15	4	172	57.91	Race 16 of 17	18.5	10.76
2010	(Austria) Red Bull	(France) Renault	B	5. Sebastian Vettel*; 6. Mark Webber	15	9	20	6	498 (Note: The points system was overhauled for the 2010 season, accounting for the extreme difference in total points.)	60.95	Race 18 of 19	44	8.84
2011	(Austria) Red Bull	(France) Renault	P	1. Sebastian Vettel*; 2. Mark Webber	18	12	28	10	650	79.56	Race 16 of 19	153	23.54
2012	(Austria) Red Bull	(France) Renault	P	1. Sebastian Vettel*; 2. Mark Webber	8	7	14	7	460	53.49	Race 19 of 20	60	13.04
2013	(Austria) Red Bull	(France) Renault	P	1. Sebastian Vettel*; 2. Mark Webber	11	13	24	12	596	72.95	Race 16 of 19	236	39.60
2014	(Germany) Mercedes	(Germany) Mercedes	P	6. Nico Rosberg; 44. Lewis Hamilton*	18	16	31	11	701	81.51	Race 16 of 19	296	42.23
2015	(Germany) Mercedes	(Germany) Mercedes	P	6. Nico Rosberg; 44. Lewis Hamilton*	18	16	32	13	703	86.05	Race 15 of 19	275	39.12
2016	(Germany) Mercedes	(Germany) Mercedes	P	6. Nico Rosberg*; 44. Lewis Hamilton	20	19	33	9	765	84.72	Race 17 of 21	297	38.82
2017	(Germany) Mercedes	(Germany) Mercedes	P	44. Lewis Hamilton*; 77. Valtteri Bottas	15	12	26	9	668	77.67	Race 17 of 20	146	21.86
2018	(Germany) Mercedes	(Germany) Mercedes	P	44. Lewis Hamilton*; 77. Valtteri Bottas	13	11	25	10	655	72.54	Race 20 of 21	84	12.82
2019	(Germany) Mercedes	(Germany) Mercedes	P	44. Lewis Hamilton*; 77. Valtteri Bottas	10	15	32	9	739	79.98	Race 17 of 21	235	31.80
2020	(Germany) Mercedes	(Germany) Mercedes	P	44. Lewis Hamilton*; 77. Valtteri Bottas; (63). George Russell	15	13	25	9	573	76.60	Race 13 of 17	254	44.33
2021	(Germany) Mercedes	(Germany) Mercedes	P	44. Lewis Hamilton; 77. Valtteri Bottas	9	9	28	10	613.5	63.84	Race 22 of 22	28	4.56
2022	(Austria) Red Bull	(United Kingdom) RBPT	P	1. Max Verstappen*; 11. Sergio Pérez	7	17	28	8	759	74.93	Race 19 of 22	205	27.01
2023	(Austria) Red Bull	(Japan) Honda RBPT	P	1. Max Verstappen*; 11. Sergio Pérez	14	21	30	11	860	81.29	Race 16 of 22	451	52.44
2024	(United Kingdom) McLaren	(Germany) Mercedes	P	4. Lando Norris; 81. Oscar Piastri	8	6	21	7	666	58.12	Race 24 of 24	14	2.10
2025	(United Kingdom) McLaren	(Germany) Mercedes	P	4. Lando Norris*; 81. Oscar Piastri	13	14	34	12	833	74.24	Race 18 of 24	364	43.70
2026 (Note: The season is ongoing. Statistics are accurate as of the Las Vegas Grand Prix.)	(Germany) Mercedes	(Germany) Mercedes	P	12. Kimi Antonelli*; 63. George Russell	12	12	24	10	666	61.72	Race 20 of 23	149	22.37
Season	Chassis	Engine	Tyre	Drivers	Poles	Wins	Podiums	Fastest laps	Points	% Points	Clinched	Margin (points)	Margin (%)
Season	Constructor		Tyre	Drivers	Poles	Wins	Podiums	Fastest laps	Points	% Points	Clinched	Margin (points)	Margin (%)

== By chassis constructor ==
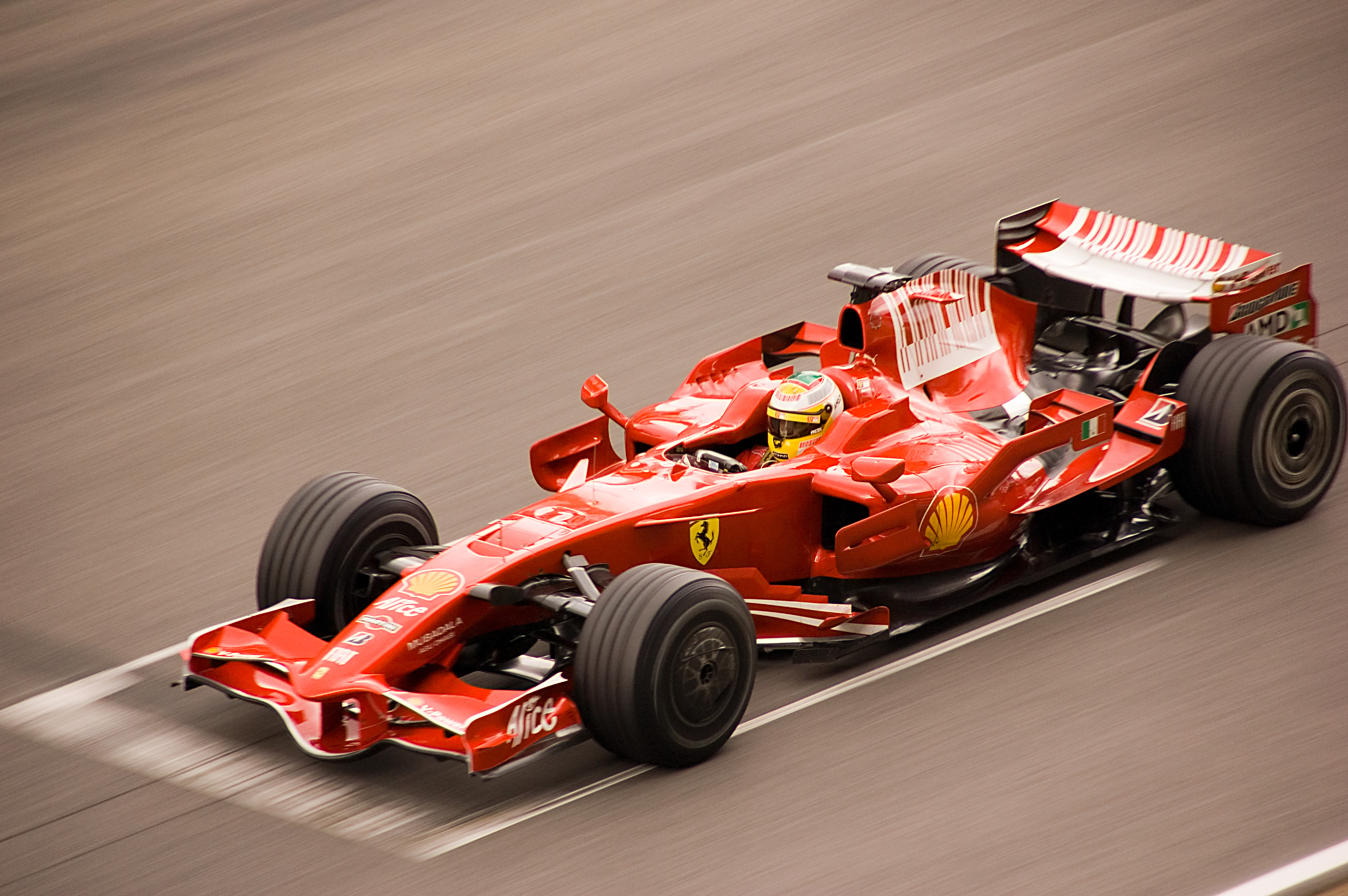
Ferrari holds the record of most World Constructors' Championship titles having won 16 times. Their first was in 1961, and their most recent title was won in 2008. (Ferrari F2008 pictured)

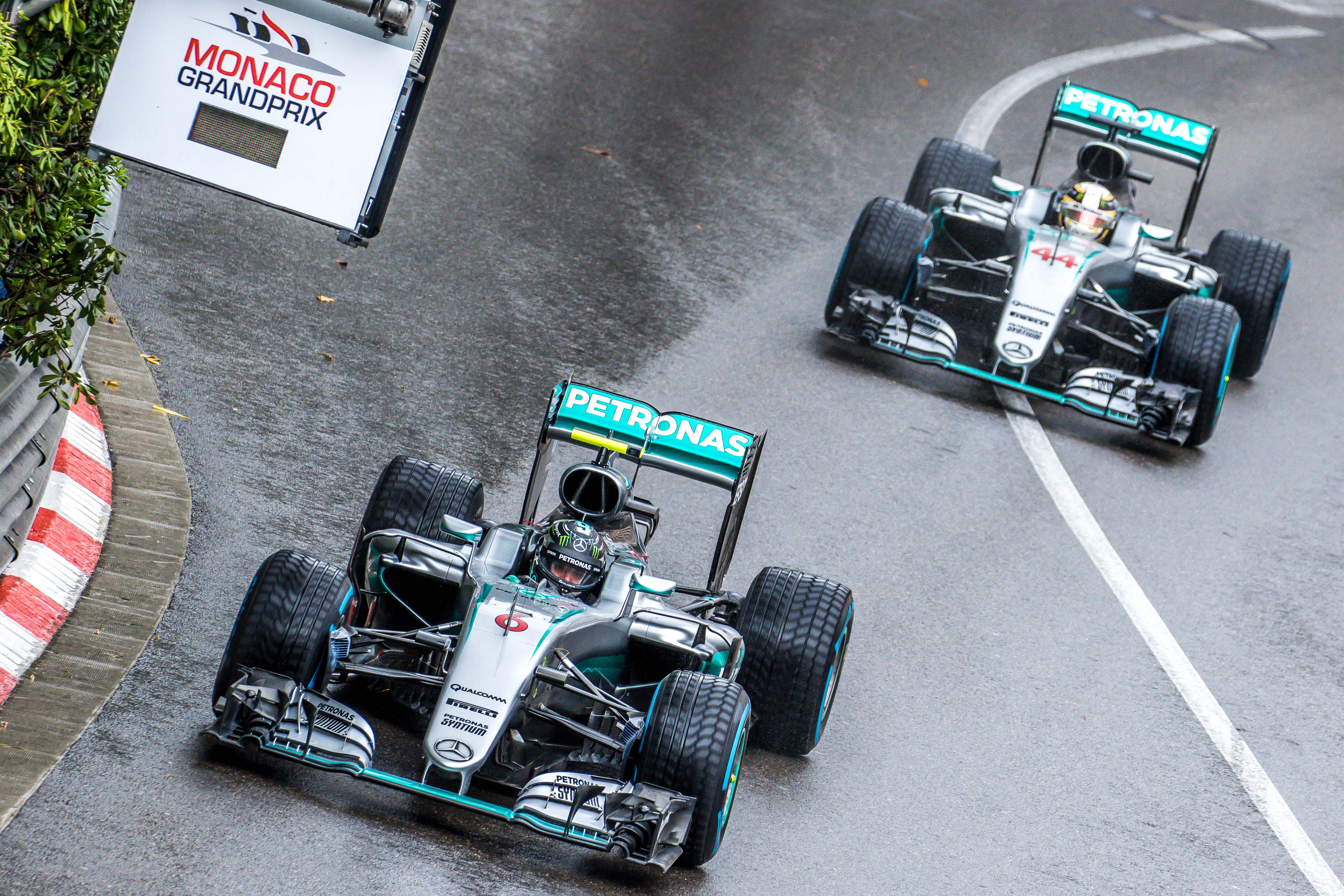
Mercedes won a record-making eight consecutive World Constructors' Championship titles spanning from 2014 to 2021. (Mercedes F1 W07 Hybrid pictured)

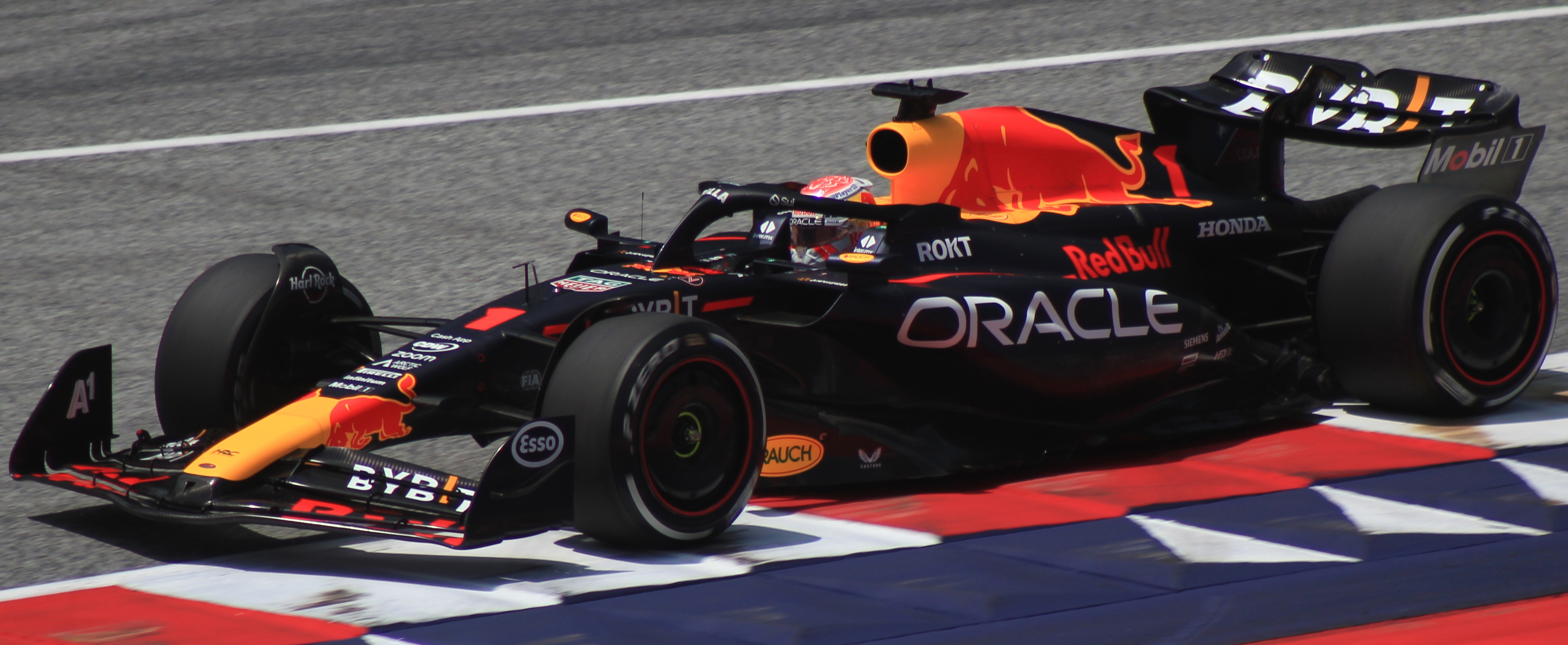
The Red Bull Racing RB19 is the most dominant car to win a World Constructors' Championship, winning 21 of 22 Grands Prix across the 2023 season.

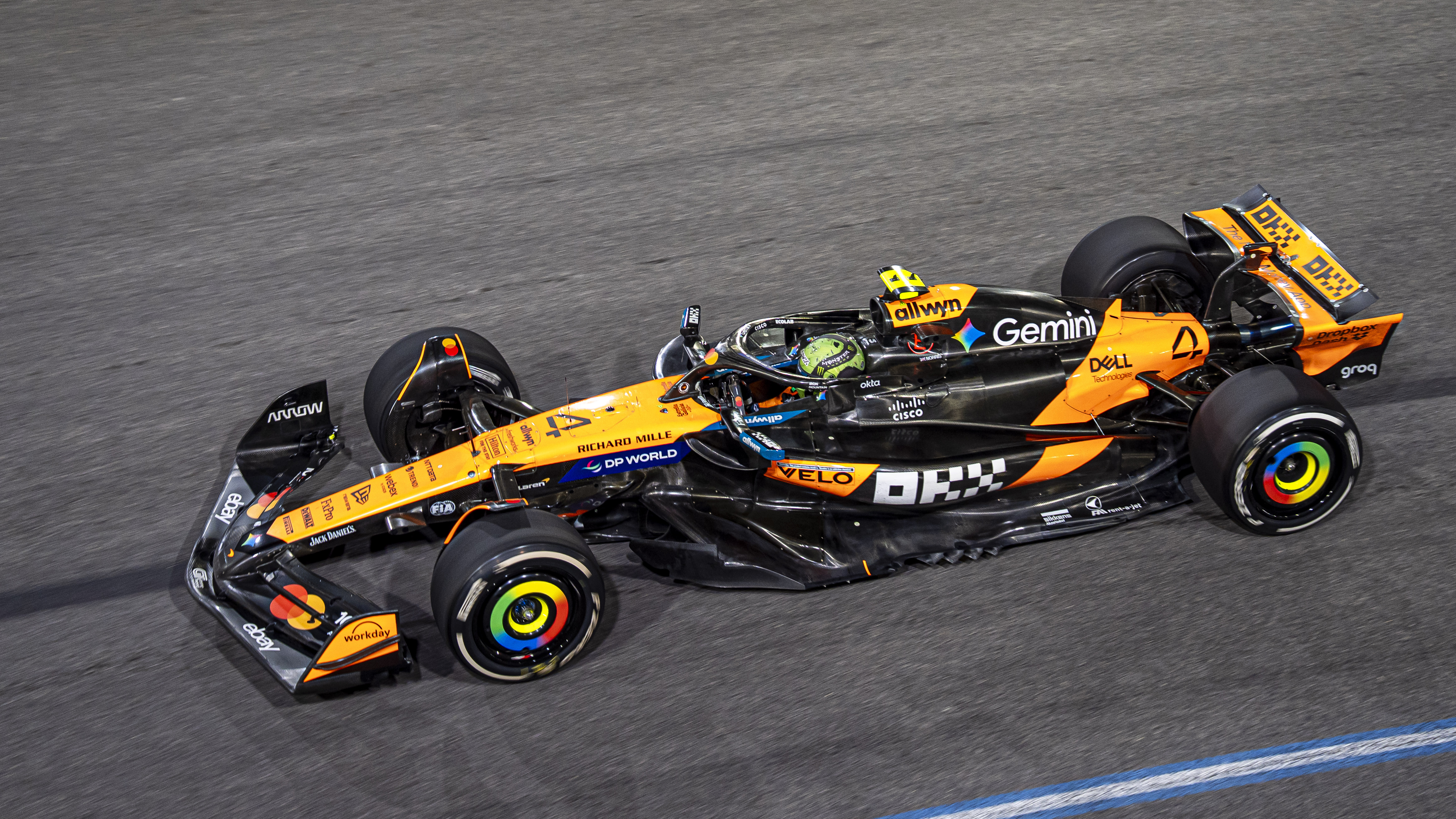
McLaren, second in all time championships, having won back-to-back titles in 2024 and 2025. (McLaren MCL39 pictured)

Constructors in bold have competed in the 2026 World Championship.

Constructors by number of World Constructors' Championships won
Constructor	Titles	Seasons
(Italy) **Ferrari**	16	1961, 1964, 1975, 1976, 1977, 1979, 1982, 1983, 1999, 2000, 2001, 2002, 2003, 2004, 2007, 2008
(United Kingdom) **McLaren**	10	1974, 1984, 1985, 1988, 1989, 1990, 1991, 1998, 2024, 2025
(United Kingdom) **Williams**	9	1980, 1981, 1986, 1987, 1992, 1993, 1994, 1996, 1997
(Germany) **Mercedes**	9	2014, 2015, 2016, 2017, 2018, 2019, 2020, 2021, 2026
(United Kingdom) Lotus	7	1963, 1965, 1968, 1970, 1972, 1973, 1978
(Austria) **Red Bull**	6	2010, 2011, 2012, 2013, 2022, 2023
(United Kingdom) Cooper	2	1959, 1960
(United Kingdom) Brabham	2	1966, 1967
(France) Renault	2	2005, 2006
(United Kingdom) Vanwall	1	1958
(United Kingdom) BRM	1	1962
(France) Matra	1	1969
(United Kingdom) Tyrrell	1	1971
(United Kingdom) Benetton	1	1995
(United Kingdom) Brawn	1	2009

== By engine manufacturer ==
Engine manufacturers in bold have competed in the 2026 World Championship. 13

Engine manufacturers by World Constructors' Championship wins
Manufacturer	Titles	Seasons
(Italy) **Ferrari**	16	1961, 1964, 1975, 1976, 1977, 1979, 1982, 1983, 1999, 2000, 2001, 2002, 2003, 2004, 2007, 2008
(Germany) **Mercedes** (Note: In 1998 built by Ilmor.)	13	1998, 2009, 2014, 2015, 2016, 2017, 2018, 2019, 2020, 2021, 2024, 2025, 2026
(France) Renault (Note: Built by Mecachrome.)	12	1992, 1993, 1994, 1995, 1996, 1997, 2005, 2006, 2010, 2011, 2012, 2013
(United States) Ford (Note: Built by Cosworth.)	10	1968, 1969, 1970, 1971, 1972, 1973, 1974, 1978, 1980, 1981
(Japan) **Honda**	6	1986, 1987, 1988, 1989, 1990, 1991
(United Kingdom) Climax	4	1959, 1960, 1963, 1965
(Australia) Repco	2	1966, 1967
(Luxembourg) TAG (Note: Built by Porsche.)	2	1984, 1985
(United Kingdom) Vanwall	1	1958
(United Kingdom) BRM	1	1962
(United Kingdom) RBPT (Note: Built by Honda.)	1	2022
(Japan) Honda RBPT	1	2023

== By tyres used ==
Tyre manufacturers in bold have competed in the 2026 World Championship.

The table includes seasons in which a supplier won by default, as the only supplier in the series. This applies to Dunlop (4 seasons, 1960 to 1963), Goodyear (7 seasons, 1987 to 1988 and 1992 to 1996), Bridgestone (6 seasons, 1999 to 2000 and 2007 to 2010), and Pirelli (16 seasons, 2011 to 2026).

World Constructors' Championship victories by tyre manufacturer
		Titles	Seasons
G	Goodyear	26 (7)	1966–1967, 1971, 1973–1978, 1980–1983, 1985–1997
P	**Pirelli**	16 (16)	2011–2026
B	Bridgestone	11 (6)	1998–2004, 2007–2010
D	Dunlop	9 (4)	1958–1965, 1969
M	Michelin	4	1979, 1984, 2005–2006
F	Firestone	3	1968, 1970, 1972

Numbers in parentheses indicate championships won as the sole tyre supplier.

== By driver ==
Drivers in bold have competed in the 2026 World Championship.

This table lists every driver who has contributed at least one point towards a World Constructors' Championship-winning team, and how many titles they have contributed to.

Drivers by number of World Constructors' Championships contributed to
Driver	Titles	Seasons
(United Kingdom) **Lewis Hamilton**	8	2014, 2015, 2016, 2017, 2018, 2019, 2020, 2021
(Germany) Michael Schumacher	7	1995, 1999, 2000, 2001, 2002, 2003, 2004
(Brazil) Rubens Barrichello	6	2000, 2001, 2002, 2003, 2004, 2009
(Austria) Niki Lauda	5	1975, 1976, 1977, 1984, 1985
(France) Alain Prost	5	1984, 1985, 1988, 1989, 1993
(Brazil) Ayrton Senna	5	1988, 1989, 1990, 1991, 1994
(Finland) **Valtteri Bottas**	5	2017, 2018, 2019, 2020, 2021
(Australia) Jack Brabham	4	1959, 1960, 1966, 1967
(Brazil) Emerson Fittipaldi	4	1970, 1972, 1973, 1974
(United Kingdom) Nigel Mansell	4	1986, 1987, 1992, 1994
(Germany) Sebastian Vettel	4	2010, 2011, 2012, 2013
(Australia) Mark Webber	4	2010, 2011, 2012, 2013
(United Kingdom) Graham Hill	3	1962, 1968, 1970
(United Kingdom) Jim Clark	3	1963, 1965, 1968
(Argentina) Carlos Reutemann	3	1977, 1980, 1981
(United Kingdom) Damon Hill	3	1993, 1994, 1996
(Germany) Nico Rosberg	3	2014, 2015, 2016
(United Kingdom) Stirling Moss	2	1958, 1959
(New Zealand) Bruce McLaren	2	1959, 1960
(New Zealand) Denny Hulme	2	1967, 1974
(United Kingdom) Jackie Stewart	2	1969, 1971
(Sweden) Ronnie Peterson	2	1973, 1978
(Switzerland) Clay Regazzoni	2	1975, 1976
(United States) Mario Andretti	2	1978, 1982
(Canada) Gilles Villeneuve	2	1979, 1982
(Australia) Alan Jones	2	1980, 1981
(France) Patrick Tambay	2	1982, 1983
(Brazil) Nelson Piquet	2	1986, 1987
(Italy) Riccardo Patrese	2	1987, 1992
(Austria) Gerhard Berger	2	1990, 1991
(United Kingdom) David Coulthard	2	1994, 1998
(Canada) Jacques Villeneuve	2	1996, 1997
(Spain) **Fernando Alonso**	2	2005, 2006
(Italy) Giancarlo Fisichella	2	2005, 2006
(Brazil) Felipe Massa	2	2007, 2008
(Finland) Kimi Räikkönen	2	2007, 2008
(Netherlands) **Max Verstappen**	2	2022, 2023
(Mexico) **Sergio Pérez**	2	2022, 2023
(United Kingdom) **Lando Norris**	2	2024, 2025
(Australia) **Oscar Piastri**	2	2024, 2025
(United Kingdom) **George Russell**	2	2020, 2026
(United Kingdom) Tony Brooks	1	1958
(United States) Phil Hill	1	1961
(Germany) Wolfgang von Trips	1	1961
(United Kingdom) John Surtees	1	1964
(Italy) Lorenzo Bandini	1	1964
(Switzerland) Jo Siffert	1	1968
(United Kingdom) Jackie Oliver	1	1968
(France) Jean-Pierre Beltoise	1	1969
(Austria) Jochen Rindt	1	1970
(United Kingdom) John Miles	1	1970
(France) François Cevert	1	1971
(United Kingdom) Mike Hailwood	1	1974
(United Kingdom) David Hobbs	1	1974
(Germany) Jochen Mass	1	1974
(South Africa) Jody Scheckter	1	1979
(France) Didier Pironi	1	1982
(France) René Arnoux	1	1983
(United Kingdom) John Watson	1	1985
(United Kingdom) Johnny Herbert	1	1995
(Germany) Heinz-Harald Frentzen	1	1997
(Finland) Mika Häkkinen	1	1998
(United Kingdom) Eddie Irvine	1	1999
(Finland) Mika Salo	1	1999
(United Kingdom) Jenson Button	1	2009
(Italy) **Kimi Antonelli**	1	2026

== Consecutive titles ==
=== By chassis constructor ===
There have been nine constructors who have achieved consecutive wins in the World Constructors' Championship. Of those, only Ferrari and Williams have won four sets of consecutive Formula One World Constructors' Championships.

Consecutive World Constructors' Championship wins by chassis
Titles	Constructor	Seasons
8	**Mercedes**	2014–2021
6	**Ferrari**	1999–2004
4	**McLaren**	1988–1991
4	**Red Bull**	2010–2013
3	**Ferrari**	1975–1977
3	**Williams**	1992–1994
2	Cooper	1959–1960
2	Brabham	1966–1967
2	Lotus	1972–1973
2	**Williams**	1980–1981; 1986–1987; 1996–1997
2	**Ferrari**	1982–1983; 2007–2008
2	**McLaren**	1984–1985; 2024–2025
2	Renault	2005–2006
2	**Red Bull**	2022–2023

Constructors in bold have competed in the 2026 World Championship.

=== By engine manufacturer ===
Consecutive World Constructors' Championship wins by engine
Titles	Manufacturer	Seasons
8	**Mercedes**	2014–2021
7	Ford	1968–1974
6	**Honda**	1986–1991
6	Renault	1992–1997
6	**Ferrari**	1999–2004
4	Renault	2010–2013
3	**Ferrari**	1975–1977
3	**Mercedes**	2024–2026
2	Climax	1959–1960
2	Repco	1966–1967
2	Ford	1980–1981
2	**Ferrari**	1982–1983; 2007–2008
2	TAG	1984–1985
2	Renault	2005–2006

Manufacturers in bold have competed in the 2026 World Championship.

== See also ==
- List of Formula One World Drivers' Champions
- List of Formula One points systems
- List of Formula One constructors
- List of Formula One engine manufacturers
