= List of Formula One seasons =

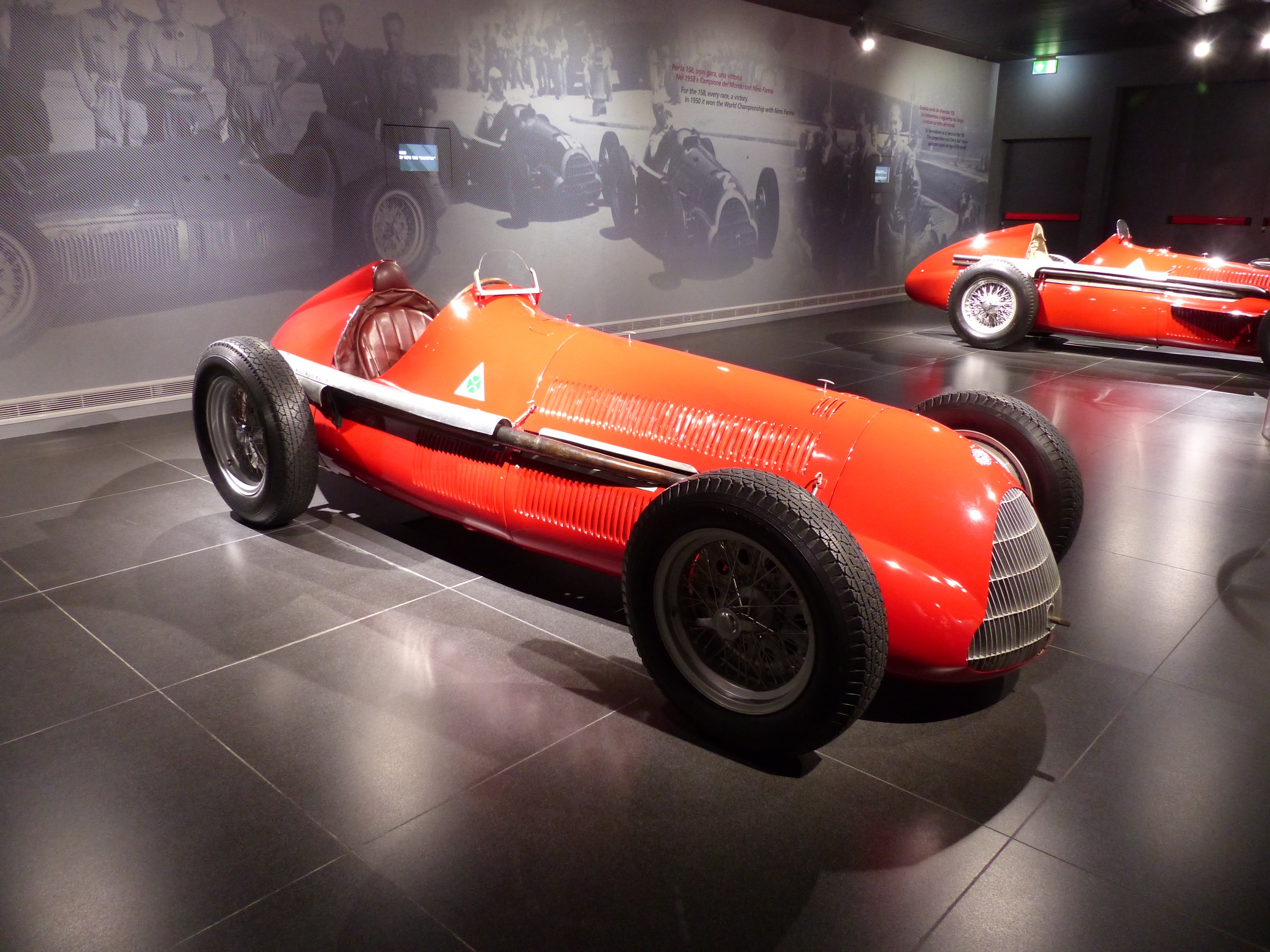
The car Giuseppe Farina used to claim the first World Drivers' Championship in 1950 (left) and the vehicle Andrea Kimi Antonelli drove to win the 2026 title (right)

A total of 76 World Championship seasons of Formula One (F1) have been run. F1 is the highest form of open wheeled auto racing series regulated by the Fédération Internationale de l'Automobile (FIA), motorsport's world governing body. The "formula" in the name alludes to a series of rules established by the FIA to which all participants and vehicles are required to conform. The F1 World Championship season consists of a series of races, known as Grands Prix, held usually on purpose-built circuits, and in a few cases on closed city streets; the most prestigious of the street circuits is the Monaco Grand Prix. As of 2021, the sporting regulations established by the FIA's Statutes state that the minimum number of events needed to form a F1 season is 8. The season can be declared a World Championship if F1 visits at least 3 continents in that season according to the International Sporting Code. The World Championship rule can be declared invalid if the FIA grants F1 a waiver for its "long‐established use of the word 'World'." Each season throughout F1 history has consisted of between 7 and 24 Grands Prix, (Note: The Indianapolis 500 was not a "Grand Prix" but was included as a round of the World Championship from 1950 to 1960.) and the regulations are regularly amended to enable an increase of the maximum number of permitted races each year.

The World Drivers' Championship is awarded to the most successful F1 driver over the course of the season, as determined by a points system based on Grand Prix results, and has been awarded since the first F1 season in 1950. The championship is the successor of the pre-war AIACR European Championship held between 1931 and 1939. The World Constructors' Championship is awarded to the most successful Formula One constructor over the course of the season, as determined by a points system based on Grand Prix results. The Constructors' Championship was first awarded as the International Cup for F1 Manufacturers in 1958, and its current name was adopted in 1981. Different combinations of chassis and engine makes are considered to be different constructors for the purposes of the Championship. Constructors' Championship points are calculated by adding points scored in each race by any driver for that constructor. Up until 1979, most seasons saw only the highest-scoring driver in each race for each constructor contributing points towards the Championship. On only 12 occasions has the World Constructors' Champion team not contained the World Drivers' Champion for that season.

As of the 2026 São Paulo Grand Prix, a total of 1,169 Formula One World Championship races have been held in 34 countries. (Note: The Formula One standard was agreed upon in 1946 with the world championship formalised the following year before the first season in 1950.) Over 77 seasons, there have been 36 participants from 15 different nationalities who have won the World Drivers' Championship, with Michael Schumacher and Lewis Hamilton tied for the record for the highest number of titles won with seven. Over 69 seasons, 15 teams representing 5 individual nations that have claimed the World Constructors' Championship, with Ferrari winning more titles than any other team with 16. Seasons which were run to F1 rules prior to the inaugural World Championship season in 1950 and those that were part of each of the British Formula One Championship and the South African Formula One Championship are not included in this list.

== Seasons ==
Key
| * | Season in progress |

List of Formula One World Championship seasons
| Season | Races | Countries | First | Last | Drivers' Champion (team) | Constructors' Champion | Winners |
|---|---|---|---|---|---|---|---|
| 1950 | 7 | 7 | British | Italian | Giuseppe Farina (ITA) (Alfa Romeo) | Not awarded | 3 |
| 1951 | 8 | 8 | Swiss | Spanish | Juan Manuel Fangio (ARG) (Alfa Romeo) | Not awarded | 6 |
| 1952 | 8 | 8 | Swiss | Italian | Alberto Ascari (ITA) (Ferrari) | Not awarded | 3 |
| 1953 | 9 | 9 | Argentine | Italian | Alberto Ascari (ITA) (Ferrari) | Not awarded | 5 |
| 1954 | 9 | 9 | Argentine | Spanish | Juan Manuel Fangio (ARG) (Maserati/Mercedes) | Not awarded | 4 |
| 1955 | 7 | 7 | Argentine | Italian | Juan Manuel Fangio (ARG) (Mercedes) | Not awarded | 4 |
| 1956 | 8 | 8 | Argentine | Italian | Juan Manuel Fangio (ARG) (Ferrari) | Not awarded | 5 |
| 1957 | 8 | 7 | Argentine | Italian | Juan Manuel Fangio (ARG) (Maserati) | Not awarded | 4 |
| 1958 | 11 | 11 | Argentine | Moroccan | Mike Hawthorn (GBR) (Ferrari) | Vanwall (GBR) | 6 |
| 1959 | 9 | 8 | Monaco | United States | Jack Brabham (AUS) (Cooper) | Cooper-Climax (GBR) | 6 |
| 1960 | 10 | 9 | Argentine | United States | Jack Brabham (AUS) (Cooper) | Cooper-Climax (GBR) | 5 |
| 1961 | 8 | 8 | Monaco | United States | Phil Hill (USA) (Ferrari) | Ferrari (ITA) | 5 |
| 1962 | 9 | 9 | Dutch | South African | Graham Hill (GBR) (BRM) | BRM (GBR) | 4 |
| 1963 | 10 | 10 | Monaco | South African | Jim Clark (GBR) (Lotus) | Lotus-Climax (GBR) | 3 |
| 1964 | 10 | 10 | Monaco | Mexican | John Surtees (GBR) (Ferrari/NART) | Ferrari (ITA) | 5 |
| 1965 | 10 | 10 | South African | Mexican | Jim Clark (GBR) (Lotus) | Lotus-Climax (GBR) | 4 |
| 1966 | 9 | 9 | Monaco | Mexican | Jack Brabham (AUS) (Brabham) | Brabham-Repco (GBR) | 5 |
| 1967 | 11 | 11 | South African | Mexican | Denny Hulme (NZL) (Brabham) | Brabham-Repco (GBR) | 7 |
| 1968 | 12 | 12 | South African | Mexican | Graham Hill (GBR) (Lotus) | Lotus-Ford (GBR) | 7 |
| 1969 | 11 | 11 | South African | Mexican | Jackie Stewart (GBR) (Matra) | Matra-Ford (FRA) | 5 |
| 1970 | 13 | 13 | South African | Mexican | Jochen Rindt (AUT) (Lotus) | Lotus-Ford (GBR) | 7 |
| 1971 | 11 | 11 | South African | United States | Jackie Stewart (GBR) (Tyrrell) | Tyrrell-Ford (GBR) | 6 |
| 1972 | 12 | 12 | Argentine | United States | Emerson Fittipaldi (BRA) (Lotus) | Lotus-Ford (GBR) | 5 |
| 1973 | 15 | 15 | Argentine | United States | Jackie Stewart (GBR) (Tyrrell) | Lotus-Ford (GBR) | 5 |
| 1974 | 15 | 15 | Argentine | United States | Emerson Fittipaldi (BRA) (McLaren) | McLaren-Ford (GBR) | 7 |
| 1975 | 14 | 14 | Argentine | United States | Niki Lauda (AUT) (Ferrari) | Ferrari (ITA) | 9 |
| 1976 | 16 | 15 | Brazilian (Note: The 1976 Argentine Grand Prix was due to begin the 1976 Formula One season but it was cancelled as a result of economical and political unrest in Argentina.) | Japanese | James Hunt (GBR) (McLaren) | Ferrari (ITA) | 7 |
| 1977 | 17 | 16 | Argentine | Japanese | Niki Lauda (AUT) (Ferrari) | Ferrari (ITA) | 8 |
| 1978 | 16 | 15 | Argentine | Canadian | Mario Andretti (USA) (Lotus) | Lotus-Ford (GBR) | 6 |
| 1979 | 15 | 14 | Argentine | United States | Jody Scheckter (ZAF) (Ferrari) | Ferrari (ITA) | 7 |
| 1980 | 14 | 13 | Argentine | United States | Alan Jones (AUS) (Williams) | Williams-Ford (GBR) | 7 |
| 1981 | 15 | 13 | United States West | Caesars Palace | Nelson Piquet (BRA) (Brabham) | Williams-Ford (GBR) | 7 |
| 1982 | 16 | 12 | South African | Caesars Palace | Keke Rosberg (FIN) (Williams) | Ferrari (ITA) | 11 |
| 1983 | 15 | 13 | Brazilian | South African | Nelson Piquet (BRA) (Brabham) | Ferrari (ITA) | 8 |
| 1984 | 16 | 14 | Brazilian | Portuguese | Niki Lauda (AUT) (McLaren) | McLaren-TAG (GBR) | 5 |
| 1985 | 16 | 14 | Brazilian | Australian | Alain Prost (FRA) (McLaren) | McLaren-TAG (GBR) | 8 |
| 1986 | 16 | 15 | Brazilian | Australian | Alain Prost (FRA) (McLaren) | Williams-Honda (GBR) | 5 |
| 1987 | 16 | 15 | Brazilian | Australian | Nelson Piquet (BRA) (Williams) | Williams-Honda (GBR) | 5 |
| 1988 | 16 | 15 | Brazilian | Australian | Ayrton Senna (BRA) (McLaren) | McLaren-Honda (GBR) | 3 |
| 1989 | 16 | 15 | Brazilian | Australian | Alain Prost (FRA) (McLaren) | McLaren-Honda (GBR) | 6 |
| 1990 | 16 | 15 | United States | Australian | Ayrton Senna (BRA) (McLaren) | McLaren-Honda (GBR) | 6 |
| 1991 | 16 | 15 | United States | Australian | Ayrton Senna (BRA) (McLaren) | McLaren-Honda (GBR) | 5 |
| 1992 | 16 | 15 | South African | Australian | Nigel Mansell (GBR) (Williams) | Williams-Renault (GBR) | 5 |
| 1993 | 16 | 14 | South African | Australian | Alain Prost (FRA) (Williams) | Williams-Renault (GBR) | 4 |
| 1994 | 16 | 13 | Brazilian | Australian | Michael Schumacher (DEU) (Benetton) | Williams-Renault (GBR) | 4 |
| 1995 | 17 | 14 | Brazilian | Australian | Michael Schumacher (DEU) (Benetton) | Benetton-Renault (GBR) | 5 |
| 1996 | 16 | 14 | Australian | Japanese | Damon Hill (GBR) (Williams) | Williams-Renault (GBR) | 4 |
| 1997 | 17 | 14 | Australian | European | Jacques Villeneuve (CAN) (Williams) | Williams-Renault (GBR) | 6 |
| 1998 | 16 | 14 | Australian | Japanese | Mika Häkkinen (FIN) (McLaren) | McLaren-Mercedes (GBR) | 4 |
| 1999 | 16 | 14 | Australian | Japanese | Mika Häkkinen (FIN) (McLaren) | Ferrari (ITA) | 6 |
| 2000 | 17 | 15 | Australian | Malaysian | Michael Schumacher (DEU) (Ferrari) | Ferrari (ITA) | 4 |
| 2001 | 17 | 15 | Australian | Japanese | Michael Schumacher (DEU) (Ferrari) | Ferrari (ITA) | 5 |
| 2002 | 17 | 15 | Australian | Japanese | Michael Schumacher (DEU) (Ferrari) | Ferrari (ITA) | 4 |
| 2003 | 16 | 14 | Australian | Japanese | Michael Schumacher (DEU) (Ferrari) | Ferrari (ITA) | 8 |
| 2004 | 18 | 16 | Australian | Brazilian | Michael Schumacher (DEU) (Ferrari) | Ferrari (ITA) | 5 |
| 2005 | 19 | 17 | Australian | Chinese | Fernando Alonso (ESP) (Renault) | Renault (FRA) | 5 |
| 2006 | 18 | 16 | Bahrain | Brazilian | Fernando Alonso (ESP) (Renault) | Renault (FRA) | 5 |
| 2007 | 17 | 17 | Australian | Brazilian | Kimi Räikkönen (FIN) (Ferrari) | Ferrari (ITA) (Note: McLaren scored 218 points but were excluded from the championship because of the team's involvement in the 2007 Formula One espionage controversy. Before that, the team did not score 15 points for finishing first and fourth because one of its drivers Fernando Alonso was deemed to have delayed his teammate Lewis Hamilton enough during a pit stop to prevent him from setting a lap time in qualifying for the Hungarian.) | 4 |
| 2008 | 18 | 17 | Australian | Brazilian | Lewis Hamilton (GBR) (McLaren) | Ferrari (ITA) | 7 |
| 2009 | 17 | 16 | Australian | Abu Dhabi | Jenson Button (GBR) (Brawn) | Brawn-Mercedes (GBR) | 6 |
| 2010 | 19 | 18 | Bahrain | Abu Dhabi | Sebastian Vettel (DEU) (Red Bull) | Red Bull-Renault (AUT) | 5 |
| 2011 | 19 | 18 | Australian (Note: The Bahrain was due to begin the 2011 Formula One World Championship but was postponed and ultimately cancelled by local organisers as a result of the Bahraini uprising of 2011.) | Brazilian | Sebastian Vettel (DEU) (Red Bull) | Red Bull-Renault (AUT) | 5 |
| 2012 | 20 | 19 | Australian | Brazilian | Sebastian Vettel (DEU) (Red Bull) | Red Bull-Renault (AUT) | 8 |
| 2013 | 19 | 19 | Australian | Brazilian | Sebastian Vettel (DEU) (Red Bull) | Red Bull-Renault (AUT) | 5 |
| 2014 | 19 | 19 | Australian | Abu Dhabi | Lewis Hamilton (GBR) (Mercedes) | Mercedes (DEU) | 3 |
| 2015 | 19 | 19 | Australian | Abu Dhabi | Lewis Hamilton (GBR) (Mercedes) | Mercedes (DEU) | 3 |
| 2016 | 21 | 21 | Australian | Abu Dhabi | Nico Rosberg (DEU) (Mercedes) | Mercedes (DEU) | 4 |
| 2017 | 20 | 20 | Australian | Abu Dhabi | Lewis Hamilton (GBR) (Mercedes) | Mercedes (DEU) | 5 |
| 2018 | 21 | 21 | Australian | Abu Dhabi | Lewis Hamilton (GBR) (Mercedes) | Mercedes (DEU) | 5 |
| 2019 | 21 | 21 | Australian | Abu Dhabi | Lewis Hamilton (GBR) (Mercedes) | Mercedes (DEU) | 5 |
| 2020 | 17 (Note: The 2020 season was scheduled to feature 22 races before the COVID-19 pandemic forced 13 race cancellations and the addition of new events to the calendar.) | 12 | Austrian | Abu Dhabi | Lewis Hamilton (GBR) (Mercedes) | Mercedes (DEU) | 5 |
| 2021 | 22 (Note: COVID-19 restrictions meant the 2021 season featured 22 races instead of a planned 23 with the addition of new Grands Prix and the cancellation of five planned events.) | 20 | Bahrain | Abu Dhabi | Max Verstappen (NLD) (Red Bull) | Mercedes (DEU) | 6 |
| 2022 | 22 (Note: Due to the 2022 Russian invasion of Ukraine and the following suspension of the Russian Grand Prix, the 2022 season featured 22 races instead of the originally planned 23 races, the FIA deciding not to replace the suspended Grand Prix.) | 20 | Bahrain | Abu Dhabi | Max Verstappen (NLD) (Red Bull) | Red Bull-RBPT (AUT) | 5 |
| 2023 | 22 (Note: Due to continuing COVID-19 restrictions in China that forced the cancellation of the Chinese Grand Prix, the season was expected to feature 23 races instead of the originally planned 24 events, the FIA deciding not to replace the event. The Emilia Romagna Grand Prix was later cancelled due to torrential rain and floods in Emilia-Romagna, further reducing the calendar to 22 races.) | 20 | Bahrain | Abu Dhabi | Max Verstappen (NLD) (Red Bull) | Red Bull-Honda RBPT (AUT) | 3 |
| 2024 | 24 | 21 | Bahrain | Abu Dhabi | Max Verstappen (NLD) (Red Bull) | McLaren-Mercedes (GBR) | 7 |
| 2025 | 24 | 21 | Australian | Abu Dhabi | Lando Norris (GBR) (McLaren) | McLaren-Mercedes (GBR) | 4 |
| 2026* | 23 | 20 | Australian | Abu Dhabi | Kimi Antonelli (ITA) (Mercedes) | Mercedes (DEU) | 6 |

== Bibliography ==
- Hayhoe, David (1989). Kimberley Grand Prix Data Book: Formula 1 Racing Facts and Figures 1950 to Date. Sparkford, England: Haynes Publishing. ISBN 0-946132-63-1 – via Open Library.
- Hughes, Mark; Tremayne, David (2002). The Concise Encyclopedia of Formula 1. Bath, England: Parragon. ISBN 0-75258-766-8 – via Open Library.
- White, John (2008) [2007]. The Formula One Miscellany (Second ed.). London, England: Carlton Books. ISBN 978-1-84732-112-1 – via Open Library.
- Smith, Roger (2019). Formula 1 All The Races: The First 1000. Poundbury, England: Veloce Publishing. ISBN 978-1-787115-66-8.
- Arron, Simon; Dodgins, Tony (2022). Formula One: The Pinnacle: The Pivotal Events That Made Formula 1 Motorsport's Greatest Series. Brighton, England: Ivy Press. ISBN 978-0-7112-7420-4.
