= List of Formula One engine manufacturers =

The following is a list of Formula One engine manufacturers. In Formula One motor racing, engine or power unit manufacturers are people or corporate entities which are credited as the make of Formula One engines that have competed or are intended to compete in the FIA Formula One World Championship. A constructor of an engine owns the intellectual rights to its engine.

== Engine manufacturers ==
Correct as of the 2026 Mexico City Grand Prix

Key: Races Entered = Number of individual races entered; Races Started = Number of individual races started; Wins = Number of races won; Points = Number of World Constructors' Championship points scored; Poles = Number of pole positions; FL = Number of fastest laps; Podiums = Number of podium finishes; WCC = World Constructors' Championships won; WDC = World Drivers' Championships won. Constructors with a red background, and marked with an ~ are competing in the 2026 Formula One World Championship

Manufacturer	Engines built in	Seasons	Races Entered	Races Started	Wins	Points	Poles	FL	Podiums	WCC	WDC
Acer (Note: Rebadged Ferrari engines.)	Italy	2001	17	17	0	4	0	0	0	0	0
Alfa Romeo	Italy	1950–1951, 1961–1963, 1965, 1968, 1970–1971, 1976–1987	226	215	12	148	15	20	40	0	2
Alta	United Kingdom	1950–1959	31	26	0	n/a	0	0	1	n/a	0
Arrows	United Kingdom	1998–1999	32	32	0	7	0	0	0	0	0
Asiatech (Note: Based on Peugeot engines.)	France	2001–2002	34	33	0	3	0	0	0	0	0
Aston Martin	United Kingdom	1959–1960	6	5	0	0	0	0	0	0	0
Audi~	Germany	2026–present	19	19	0	27	0	0	0	0	0
ATS	Italy	1963–1964, 1967	7	7	0	0	0	0	0	0	0
BMW	West Germany/Germany	1952–1954, 1967–1968, 1982–1987, 2000–2009	273	270	20	1021	33	33	86	0	1
Borgward	West Germany	1959, 1962–1963	3	1	0	0	0	0	0	0	0
BPM	Italy	1952	1	0	0	n/a	0	0	0	n/a	0
Bristol	United Kingdom	1952–1957	17	17	0	n/a	0	0	1	n/a	0
BRM	United Kingdom	1951, 1956–1960, 1962–1977	200	189	18	499	11	14	65	1	1
Bugatti	France	1956	1	1	0	n/a	0	0	0	n/a	0
Butterworth	United Kingdom	1952	4	2	0	n/a	0	0	0	n/a	0
BWT Mercedes (Note: Rebadged Mercedes engines.)	United Kingdom	2019–2020	38	38	1	268	1	0	4	0	0
Castellotti	Italy	1960	4	3	0	3	0	0	0	0	0
Climax	United Kingdom	1957–1969	97	96	40	684	44	44	104	4	4
Conrero	Italy	1961	1	1	0	0	0	0	0	0	0
Cosworth	United Kingdom	2000–2006, 2010–2013	199	199	0	179	1	1	2	0	0
De Tomaso	Italy	1962	1	0	0	0	0	0	0	0	0
EMW	East Germany	1953	1	1	0	n/a	0	0	0	n/a	0
ERA	United Kingdom	1950–1951	4	4	0	n/a	0	0	0	n/a	0
European (Note: Rebadged Ford engines.)	United Kingdom	2001	17	17	0	0	0	0	0	0	0
Ferrari~	Italy	1950–present	1147	1143	251	12486	257	280	856	16	15
Fiat	Italy	1950	1	0	0	n/a	0	0	0	n/a	0
Fondmetal (Note: Rebadged Ford engines.)	United Kingdom	2000	17	17	0	0	0	0	0	0	0
Ford (Note: Between 1963–1965, 1967–1999 and 2003–2004 built by Cosworth, funded by Ford.)	United Kingdom (Note: Between 1963–1965, 1967–1999 and 2003–2004 the Ford-badged engines were made by Cosworth in the United Kingdom.); United States	1951, 1963–1999, 2003–2004	528	523	176	4286.5	139	159	533	10	13
Gordini	France	1950–1956	45	40	0	n/a	0	1	2	n/a	0
Hart	United Kingdom	1981–1986, 1993–1997	158	144	0	63	2	2	5	0	0
Honda~	Japan	1964–1968, 1983–1992, 2000–2008, 2015–2021, 2026–present	501	500	89	3414	90	76	223	6	6
Honda RBPT (Note: Rebadged Honda engines.)	Japan	2023–2025	70	70	38	2063	30	20	64	1	2
Ilmor	United Kingdom	1991–1992, 1994	48	37	0	12	0	0	0	0	0
Jaguar	United Kingdom	1950	1	1	0	n/a	0	0	0	n/a	0
JAP	United Kingdom	1950	1	1	0	n/a	0	0	0	n/a	0
Judd	United Kingdom	1988–1992	76	68	0	86	0	3	8	0	0
Küchen	West Germany	1952	1	1	0	n/a	0	0	0	n/a	0
Lamborghini	Italy	1989–1993	80	80	0	20	0	0	1	0	0
Lancia	Italy	1953–1955	6	4	0	n/a	2	1	1	n/a	0
Lea-Francis	United Kingdom	1952–1954	10	10	0	n/a	0	0	0	n/a	0
Life	Italy	1990	12	0	0	0	0	0	0	0	0
Maserati	Italy	1950–1963, 1966–1969	113	108	11	72	11	17	44	0	2
Matra	France	1968, 1970–1972, 1975–1978, 1981–1982	126	125	3	173	4	5	24	0	0
Mecachrome (Note: Based on Renault engines.)	France	1998	16	16	0	38	0	0	3	0	0
Megatron (Note: Based on BMW engines.)	Switzerland	1987–1988	32	32	0	35	0	0	1	0	0
Mercedes~ (Note: Between 1994–2005 built by Ilmor, funded by Mercedes-Benz.)	United Kingdom (Note: Engines built in West Germany between 1954–1955.)	1954–1955, 1994–present	632	630	252	17475.5	264	250	691	12	15
Motori Moderni	Italy	1985–1987	46	44	0	0	0	0	0	0	0
Mugen-Honda	Japan	1992–2000	147	147	4	182	1	0	16	0	0
OSCA	Italy	1951–1953, 1958–1959, 1961–1962	12	8	0	0	0	0	0	0	0
Osella (Note: Rebadged Alfa Romeo engines.)	Italy	1988	16	10	0	0	0	0	0	0	0
Petronas (Note: Rebadged Ferrari engines.)	Italy	1997–2005	153	151	0	142	0	0	4	0	0
Peugeot	France	1994–2000	115	115	0	128	0	1	14	0	0
Playlife (Note: Rebadged Renault and Supertec engines.)	France	1998–2000	49	49	0	69	1	1	6	0	0
Porsche	Germany	1958–1964, 1991	39	35	1	48	1	0	5	0	0
Pratt & Whitney	United States	1971	3	3	0	0	0	0	0	0	0
Red Bull Powertrains (Note: Rebadged Honda engines.)	Japan	2022	22	22	17	794	8	8	28	1	1
Red Bull Ford~	United Kingdom	2026–present	19	19	3	490	2	2	13	0	0
Renault	France	1977–1986, 1989–1997, 2001–2025	774	771	169	8228.5	213	177	465	12	11
Repco	Australia	1966–1969	33	33	8	126	7	4	25	2	2
Sauber (Note: Rebadged Ilmor engines.)	United Kingdom	1993	16	16	0	12	0	0	0	0	0
Scarab	United States	1960	6	2	0	0	0	0	0	0	0
Serenissima	Italy	1966	3	1	0	1	0	0	0	0	0
Subaru (Note: Built by Motori Moderni for Subaru.)	Italy	1990	8	0	0	0	0	0	0	0	0
Supertec (Note: Rebadged Mecachrome engines based on Renault technology.)	France	1999–2000	33	33	0	42	0	1	3	0	0
TAG (Note: Built by Porsche, funded by TAG.)	West Germany	1983–1987	68	68	25	405.5	7	18	54	2	3
TAG Heuer (Note: Rebadged Renault engines.)	France	2016–2018	62	62	9	1255	3	13	42	0	0
Talbot	France	1950–1951	14	13	0	n/a	0	0	2	n/a	0
Tecno	Italy	1972–1973	13	10	0	1	0	0	0	0	0
Toro Rosso (Note: Rebadged Renault engines.)	France	2017	20	20	0	53	0	0	0	0	0
Toyota	Germany (Note: Toyota engines were made at the Toyota Motorsport GmbH facility in Cologne.)	2002–2009	140	140	0	384	3	4	17	0	0
Vanwall	United Kingdom	1954–1960	29	28	9	57	7	6	13	1	0
Veritas	West Germany	1951–1953	6	6	0	n/a	0	0	0	n/a	0
Weslake	United Kingdom	1966–1968	18	18	1	13	0	2	2	0	0
Yamaha	Japan	1989, 1991–1997	130	116	0	36	0	0	2	0	0
Zakspeed	West Germany	1985–1988	57	51	0	2	0	0	0	0	0
Manufacturer	Engines built in	Seasons	Races Entered	Races Started	Wins	Points	Poles	FL	Podiums	WCC	WDC

=== Indianapolis 500 only ===
Engine manufacturers whose only World Championship participation was in the Indianapolis 500 from 1950 to 1960 when the race was part of the World Drivers' Championship. All were based in the United States.

- Cadillac
- Chevrolet
- Chrysler
- Cummins
- DeSoto
- Dodge
- Duray
- Mercury
- Miller
- Novi
- Offenhauser (Note: Offenhauser made one non-Indianapolis 500 participation at the 1959 United States Grand Prix.)
- R Miller
- Sparks
- Studebaker
- Voelker
- Wayne
