= Mark Hughes (motorsport) =

British motorsport businessman

Mark Hughes has worked in professional motorsport for over 20 years having started in the UK with rallying before moving to circuit racing and circuit operations.

== Career ==
Hughes' first senior management position was as operations manager at Brands Hatch, then part of the Octagon Motorsport group which ran Silverstone, Cadwell Park, Oulton Park and Snetterton as well. Hughes primarily oversaw the operation of the circuit but also the rally and race schools and all corporate products.

In 2002 Mark went back to rallying and worked for the MSA, the UK governing body for motorsport and was the commercial manager for their subsidiary, IMS. IMS events included Wales Rally GB, the British Rally Championship, the London to Brighton Veteran Car Run and a number of other classic car tours.

Arguably Hughes' biggest break came in 2004 when he relocated to Bahrain to run the new Formula One circuit there. He was appointed as the operations director, reporting to Martin Whitaker, CEO and formerly the head of Ford Motorsport. A Tilke-designed track in the small GCC Kingdom of Bahrain, this was without doubt one of the most spectacular new tracks on the F1 calendar. Constructed in 16 months the track hosted their first Grand Prix in 2004 and won the prestigious FIA Formula One World Championship Race Promoters Trophy. In addition to F1 the track also hosted FIA GTs, the Formula BMW World Final, Australian V8 Supercars and major drag race events. The circuit also developed numerous corporate and retail products such as the Caterham driving experiences, the BMW school and the only Hummer Off Road Academy outside of the US.

Whilst in Bahrain, Hughes was appointed to the Board of Directors of Motorsport Development UK, a UK government body established to support the UK motorsport industry. His appointment was made by the Secretary of State and was for three years.

Hughes left Bahrain in 2009 and was asked to help set up the new Middle East facility in Abu Dhabi, Yas Marina Circuit. He was a specialist consultant on the project and contributed significantly in getting the venue ready for the first race in November 2009. The Yas Marina Circuit set new standards for a motorsport venue and was the first circuit to host a day/night race. Yas Marina Circuit also won the prestigious FIA Formula One World Championship Race Promoters Trophy.

The Abu Dhabi consultancy was a stop gap for Hughes who already had plans to go to India to work for the Jaypee Group who were just starting construction of their new F1 facility 50 km (31 mi) outside of Delhi. The Buddh International Circuit would be the first F1 track in India and their inaugural race would be in October 2011. Mark was appointed as vice president – operations to head up JPSI, the sporting division of Jaypee. JPSI not only planned the F1 circuit but an entire sports city including an international cricket stadium, sports complex, residential and commercial developments. His input into the infrastructure and planning for the Grand Prix led to JPSI hosting a successful inaugural Grand Prix. One that also won the FIA Formula One World Championship Race Promoters Trophy.

In late 2010, Hughes was persuaded to go back to Yas Marina Circuit as operations director, heading up the largest team at the track. His responsibilities at YMC include all event planning and delivery, sporting, safety, venue management, security, maintenance, retail and corporate products (drag, karting, race school, community) and food and beverage.
