= Martin Whitaker =

British businessman

- Born: England, United Kingdom
- Occupation: Businessman
- Years active: 1980s–present

Martin Whitaker is an English businessman who is best known for his involvement within motorsport. Born into a farming family, Whitaker started a career in journalism before working in press relations. He subsequently joined Ford, working within major areas of motorsport, before leaving in 2003. In 2004, Whitaker was appointed CEO of the Bahrain International Circuit and worked as CEO of the Australian V8 Supercars series from 2010.

== Life and career ==
Whitaker was born to a fruit farming family from the West of England. As a child, he played rugby, later developing an interest in motor racing.

Whitaker's first venture into motor racing was becoming a junior reporter for the weekly racing magazine Motoring News, eventually becoming their touring car reporter. In March 1985, he applied for the job of a press officer at the Royal Automobile Club Motor Sports Association until 1988. FIA president Jean-Marie Balestre, who was searching for an English-speaking press relations man for the Fédération Internationale du Sport Automobile (FISA), approached Whitaker for the job and accepted it in a meeting at the FIA Headquarters in Paris in 1988. A year later, Whitaker ran media operations for FISA before joining FOCA television in 1990.

In mid-1996, Whitaker was appointed as Ford's head of the European Motorsport Program, succeeding Gillitzer whose contract was not renewed. Whitaker covered the areas of Formula One, the World Rally Championship and local touring car series. He left in October 1999.

Martin Whitaker worked for FIA Presidents Jean-Marie Balestre and Max Mosley for Bernie Ecclestone's Formula One Management, McLaren International and as Director of Motorsport for Ford Motor Company.

In June 2004, Whitaker was appointed as the General Manager of the Bahrain International Circuit. He worked in this capacity until after the 2010 Bahrain Grand Prix.

In April 2010, Whitaker became the CEO of the Australian V8 Supercars series. He relinquished the CEO role in September 2011 to focus on managing the series' races outside Australia. In 2012, Whitaker moved back to Bahrain and set up a consultancy business.

In 2015, Martin Whitaker was appointed Lead Consultant and Chief Executive Officer of Circuit of Wales, a project to construct a motorsport venue in Blaenau Gwent, Wales. He continues to manage his successful business consulting firm Sportique88 WLL.

In 2009, ArabianBusiness.com listed Whitaker as the 31st most powerful businessman in Bahrain.
