= List of Formula One Grands Prix =

Formula One (F1) is the highest class of open-wheeled auto racing series managed by the Fédération Internationale de l'Automobile (FIA), motorsport's world governing body. The "formula" in the name alludes to a series of FIA rules to which all participants and vehicles are required to conform. The Formula One World Championship season consists of a series of races around the world, known as Grands Prix, usually held on purpose-built circuits, and in a few cases on closed city streets. Each Grand Prix meeting lasts three days with either one or three practice sessions before a three-part qualifying session on Saturday to set the starting order for Sunday's race. A Saturday sprint is held at select events, with the starting grid determined by a separate, shorter qualifying session held on Friday. Grands Prix are frequently named after the country, region or city in which they are raced, and in some seasons, nations have hosted more than one event. Should Formula One hold two or more races in the same nation in the same year, on either a different or the same track, then their names will be different. The results of each Grand Prix held throughout the season are combined to decide two annual championships, one for drivers and one for constructors.

Grand Prix distance regulations have varied throughout Formula One history. Between 1950 and 1957, events ran for more than 300 km (190 mi) or three hours. In 1958, race lengths were set between 300 and 500 km (190 and 310 mi) or two hours. It was reduced to between 300 and 400 km (190 and 250 mi) from 1966 with an established maximum length of 321.87 km (200.00 mi) in 1971. From 1973 to 1980, races had to last either 321.87 km (200.00 mi) or two hours, whichever came first. Distances of between 250 and 320 km (160 and 200 mi) or two hours were used from 1981 to 1984. The minimum distance was revised to 300 km (186 mi) including the formation lap in 1984 and the maximum length was standardised at 305 kilometres (190 mi) in 1989. (Note: The primary reason for the reduction of Grand Prix distance throughout the history of Formula One was to accommodate television preferring shorter races with more on-track activity.) The exception to the rule is the Monaco Grand Prix, which has a scheduled length of at least 260 km (160 mi). No race can last more than two hours if it goes unhalted. From 2012, the maximum permitted race time including probable stoppages was four hours, before being reduced to three hours for 2021.

The British Grand Prix and Italian Grand Prix are the most frequently held events in the Formula One World Championship with 77 editions each since the races first formed a part of the series in 1950, followed by the Monaco Grand Prix which has been held 72 times, all on the same course, the Circuit de Monaco. Italy's Monza Circuit has hosted the most Grands Prix on any circuit with 76. The Circuit de Monaco is second with 72 events and the Silverstone Circuit in the United Kingdom is third with 61 races. Austria, Bahrain, Germany, France, Italy, Japan, Spain, the United Kingdom and the United States have all held two Grands Prix in various seasons; the United States and Italy are the only countries to have hosted three races during a season. Italy has held the most Grands Prix with 110 since its first in 1950. Only Morocco has staged just one Grand Prix. The most recent addition was the Barcelona-Catalunya Grand Prix in 2026.

Locations of the countries that have hosted a Grand Prix. Nations on a current schedule are highlighted in green, with circuit locations marked in black. Former host nations are shown in dark grey. Former host circuits are marked with a white dot. De facto status of territories is shown.

As of the 2026 São Paulo Grand Prix, 1,169 World Championship events have been held over 77 seasons in 34 countries and under 55 race titles at 78 racing circuits. These figures include the Indianapolis 500 races which were a part of the World Championships from 1950 until 1960 despite not being named a Grand Prix. The 1950 British Grand Prix was the first Formula One World Championship Grand Prix. Not included in this list are non-championship Grands Prix held to Formula One regulations from 1946 to 1983 and as part of each of the British Formula One Championship and the South African Formula One Championship.

== Active and past races ==
Key
*	Current Grands Prix (for the 2026 season)
‡	Returning Grands Prix (for the 2027 season)

=== By race title ===
Races have been held under 55 race titles as of the 2026 São Paulo Grand Prix.

Formula One Grands Prix by race title
Race title	Country	Years held	Circuits	Total
70th Anniversary Grand Prix (Note: The 70th Anniversary Grand Prix was held in the United Kingdom.)	United Kingdom	2020	1	1
Abu Dhabi Grand Prix* (Note: The Abu Dhabi Grand Prix was held in the United Arab Emirates.)	United Arab Emirates	2009–2025	1	17
Argentine Grand Prix	Argentina	1953–1958, 1960, 1972–1975, 1977–1981, 1995–1998 (Note: The 1999 Argentine Grand Prix was on the provisional 1999 schedule, but it was cancelled as a consequence of the failure to reach a financial agreement.)	1	20
Australian Grand Prix*	Australia	1985–2019, 2022–2026	2	40
Austrian Grand Prix*	Austria	1964, 1970–1987, 1997–2003, 2014–2026	2	39
Azerbaijan Grand Prix*	Azerbaijan	2017–2019, 2021–2026	1	9
Bahrain Grand Prix*	Bahrain; Malaysia	2004–2010, (Note: The 2011 Bahrain Grand Prix was cancelled as a result of the Bahraini uprising of 2011.) 2012–2026 (Note: The 2026 Bahrain Grand Prix was held at the Sepang International Circuit, Malaysia, as a result of the 2026 Iran war.)	2	22
Barcelona-Catalunya Grand Prix* (Note: The Barcelona-Catalunya Grand Prix was held in Spain.)	Spain	2026	1	1
Belgian Grand Prix*	Belgium	1950–1956, 1958, 1960–1968, 1970, 1972–2002, 2004–2005, 2007–2026	3	71
Brazilian Grand Prix	Brazil	1973–2019	2	47
British Grand Prix*	United Kingdom	1950–2026	3	77
Caesars Palace Grand Prix (Note: The Caesars Palace Grand Prix was held in the United States.)	United States	1981–1982	1	2
Canadian Grand Prix*	Canada	1967–1974, 1976–1986, 1988–2008, 2010–2019, 2022–2026	3	55
Chinese Grand Prix*	China	2004–2019, 2024–2026	1	19
Dallas Grand Prix (Note: The Dallas Grand Prix was held in the United States.)	United States	1984	1	1
Detroit Grand Prix (Note: The Detroit Grand Prix was held in the United States.)	United States	1982–1988	1	7
Dutch Grand Prix*	Netherlands	1952–1953, 1955, 1958–1971, 1973–1985, 2021–2026	1	36
Eifel Grand Prix (Note: The Eifel Grand Prix was held in Germany.)	Germany	2020	1	1
Emilia Romagna Grand Prix (Note: The Emilia Romagna Grand Prix was held in Italy.)	Italy	2020–2022, 2024–2025	1	5
European Grand Prix (Note: The European Grand Prix was held in Germany (12 times), in Spain (7 times), in the United Kingdom (3 times), and in Azerbaijan (once).)	United Kingdom; Germany; Spain; Azerbaijan	1983–1985, 1993–1997, 1999–2012, 2016	6	23
French Grand Prix	France	1950–1954, 1956–2008, 2018–2019, 2021–2022	7	62
German Grand Prix	Germany	1951–1954, 1956–1959, 1961–2006, 2008–2014, 2016, 2018–2019	3	64
Hungarian Grand Prix*	Hungary	1986–2026	1	41
Indian Grand Prix	India	2011–2013	1	3
Indianapolis 500 (Note: The Indianapolis 500 was not a "Grand Prix", but it was included as a round of the World Championship from 1950 to 1960. The race was held in the United States.)	United States	1950–1960	1	11
Italian Grand Prix*	Italy	1950–2026	2	77
Japanese Grand Prix*	Japan	1976–1977, 1987–2019, 2022–2026	2	40
Korean Grand Prix	South Korea	2010–2013	1	4
Las Vegas Grand Prix* (Note: The Las Vegas Grand Prix was held in the United States.)	United States	2023–2025	1	3
Luxembourg Grand Prix (Note: The Luxembourg Grand Prix was held in Germany.)	Germany	1997–1998	1	2
Malaysian Grand Prix	Malaysia	1999–2017	1	19
Mexican Grand Prix	Mexico	1963–1970, 1986–1992, 2015–2019	1	20
Mexico City Grand Prix* (Note: The Mexico City Grand Prix was held in Mexico.)	Mexico	2021–2026	1	6
Miami Grand Prix* (Note: The Miami Grand Prix was held in the United States.)	United States	2022–2026	1	5
Monaco Grand Prix*	Monaco	1950, 1955–2019, 2021–2026	1	72
Moroccan Grand Prix	Morocco	1958	1	1
Pacific Grand Prix (Note: The Pacific Grand Prix was held in Japan.)	Japan	1994–1995	1	2
Pescara Grand Prix (Note: The Pescara Grand Prix, also known as Coppa Acerbo, was held in Pescara, in Italy.)	Italy	1957	1	1
Portuguese Grand Prix‡	Portugal	1958–1960, 1984–1996, 2020–2021	4	18
Qatar Grand Prix*	Qatar	2021, 2023–2025	1	4
Russian Grand Prix	Russia	2014–2021	1	8
Sakhir Grand Prix (Note: The Sakhir Grand Prix was held in Bahrain.)	Bahrain	2020	1	1
San Marino Grand Prix (Note: The San Marino Grand Prix was held in Italy.)	Italy	1981–2006	1	26
São Paulo Grand Prix* (Note: The São Paulo Grand Prix was held in Brazil.)	Brazil	2021–2026	1	6
Saudi Arabian Grand Prix‡	Saudi Arabia	2021–2025 (Note: The 2026 Saudi Arabian Grand Prix was cancelled as a result of the 2026 Iran war.)	1	5
Singapore Grand Prix*	Singapore	2008–2019, 2022–2026	1	17
South African Grand Prix	South Africa	1962–1963, 1965, 1967–1980, (Note: The 1981 South African Grand Prix was not part of the World Championship due to the dispute of the FISA–FOCA war.) 1982–1985, 1992–1993	2	23
Spanish Grand Prix*	Spain	1951, 1954, 1968–1979, (Note: The championship status of the 1980 Spanish Grand Prix was withdrawn due to the dispute of the FISA–FOCA war.) 1981, 1986–2026	6	56
Styrian Grand Prix (Note: The Styrian Grand Prix was held in Austria.)	Austria	2020–2021	1	2
Swedish Grand Prix	Sweden	1973–1978 (Note: As a result of a loss of local interest due to the deaths of Gunnar Nilsson and Ronnie Peterson in 1978, the 1979 Swedish Grand Prix was cancelled. Since then, no Formula One Grand Prix has been held in Sweden.)	1	6
Swiss Grand Prix	Switzerland; France	1950–1954, 1982 (Note: The 1982 Swiss Grand Prix was held in Dijon, in France.)	2	6
Turkish Grand Prix‡	Turkey	2005–2011, 2020–2021	1	9
Tuscan Grand Prix (Note: The Tuscan Grand Prix was held in Italy.)	Italy	2020	1	1
United States Grand Prix*	United States	1959–1980, 1989–1991, 2000–2007, 2012–2019, 2021–2026	6	47
United States Grand Prix West	United States	1976–1983	1	8

=== By host nation ===
This map shows the number of Formula One World Championship races hosted by country. Colours ranging from airy green to black denote the number of Grands Prix a country has hosted. De facto status of territories is shown.

There have been 34 countries that have hosted a Formula One World Championship race, as of the 2026 São Paulo Grand Prix.

Formula One Grands Prix by host nation
Country	Races held	Total	Circuits
Argentina	Argentine Grand Prix (1953–1958, 1960, 1972–1975, 1977–1981, 1995–1998)	20	1
Australia*	Australian Grand Prix (1985–2019, 2022–2026)*	40	2
Austria*	Austrian Grand Prix: 39 (1964, 1970–1987, 1997–2003, 2014–2026)*; Styrian Grand Prix: 2 (2020–2021)	41	2
Azerbaijan*	European Grand Prix: 1 (2016); Azerbaijan Grand Prix: 9 (2017–2019, 2021–2026)*	10	1
Bahrain*	Bahrain Grand Prix: 21 (2004–2010, 2012–2025)‡ Sakhir Grand Prix: 1 (2020)	22	1
Belgium*	Belgian Grand Prix (1950–1956, 1958, 1960–1968, 1970, 1972–2002, 2004–2005, 2007–2026)*	71	3
Brazil*	Brazilian Grand Prix: 47 (1973–2019); São Paulo Grand Prix: 6 (2021–2026)*	53	2
Canada*	Canadian Grand Prix (1967–1974, 1976–1986, 1988–2008, 2010–2019, 2022–2026)*	55	3
China*	Chinese Grand Prix (2004–2019, 2024–2026)*	19	1
France	French Grand Prix: 62 (1950–1954, 1956–2008, 2018–2019, 2021–2022); Swiss Grand Prix: 1 (1982)	63	7
Germany	German Grand Prix: 64 (1951–1954, 1956–1959, 1961–2006, 2008–2014, 2016, 2018–2019); European Grand Prix: 12 (1984, 1995–1996, 1999–2007); Luxembourg Grand Prix: 2 (1997–1998); Eifel Grand Prix: 1 (2020)	79	3
Hungary*	Hungarian Grand Prix (1986–2026)*	41	1
India	Indian Grand Prix (2011–2013)	3	1
Italy*	Italian Grand Prix: 77 (1950–2026)*; Pescara Grand Prix: 1 (1957); San Marino Grand Prix: 26 (1981–2006); Tuscan Grand Prix: 1 (2020); Emilia Romagna Grand Prix: 5 (2020–2022, 2024–2025)	110	4
Japan*	Japanese Grand Prix, 40 (1976–1977, 1987–2019, 2022–2026)*; Pacific Grand Prix: 2 (1994–1995)	42	3
Malaysia*	Malaysian Grand Prix: 19 (1999–2017); Bahrain Grand Prix: 1 (2026)	20	1
Mexico*	Mexican Grand Prix: 20 (1963–1970, 1986–1992, 2015–2019); Mexico City Grand Prix: 6 (2021–2026)*	26	1
Monaco*	Monaco Grand Prix (1950, 1955–2019, 2021–2026)*	72	1
Morocco	Moroccan Grand Prix (1958)	1	1
Netherlands*	Dutch Grand Prix (1952–1953, 1955, 1958–1971, 1973–1985, 2021–2026)*	36	1
Portugal‡	Portuguese Grand Prix (1958–1960, 1984–1996, 2020–2021)‡	18	4
Qatar*	Qatar Grand Prix (2021, 2023–2025)*	4	1
Russia	Russian Grand Prix (2014–2021)	8	1
Saudi Arabia‡	Saudi Arabian Grand Prix (2021–2025)‡	5	1
Singapore*	Singapore Grand Prix (2008–2019, 2022–2026)*	17	1
South Africa	South African Grand Prix (1962–1963, 1965, 1967–1980, 1982–1985, 1992–1993)	23	2
South Korea	Korean Grand Prix (2010–2013)	4	1
Spain*	Spanish Grand Prix: 56 (1951, 1954, 1968–1979, 1981, 1986–2026)*; European Grand Prix: 7 (1994, 1997, 2008–2012); Barcelona-Catalunya Grand Prix: 1 (2026)*	64	7
Sweden	Swedish Grand Prix (1973–1978)	6	1
Switzerland	Swiss Grand Prix (1950–1954)	5	1
Turkey‡	Turkish Grand Prix (2005–2011, 2020–2021)	9	1
United Arab Emirates*	Abu Dhabi Grand Prix (2009–2025)*	17	1
United Kingdom*	British Grand Prix, 77 (1950–2026)*; European Grand Prix, 3 (1983, 1985, 1993); 70th Anniversary Grand Prix, 1 (2020)	81	4
United States*	Indianapolis 500, 11 (1950–1960); United States Grand Prix, 47 (1959–1980, 1989–1991, 2000–2007, 2012–2019, 2021–2026)*; United States Grand Prix West, 8 (1976–1983); Caesars Palace Grand Prix, 2 (1981–1982); Detroit Grand Prix, 7 (1982–1988); Dallas Grand Prix, 1 (1984); Miami Grand Prix, 5 (2022–2026)*; Las Vegas Grand Prix, 3 (2023–2025)*	84	12

=== By venue ===
A total of 78 circuits have hosted a Formula One World Championship race, as of the 2026 São Paulo Grand Prix.

Formula One Grands Prix by venue
Racing track	Races held	Total	Contracted until
(Australia) Adelaide	Australian Grand Prix (1985–1995)	11	
(Japan) Aida	Pacific Grand Prix (1994–1995)	2	
(Morocco) Ain-Diab (Casablanca)	Moroccan Grand Prix (1958)	1	
(United Kingdom) Aintree	British Grand Prix (1955, 1957, 1959, 1961–1962)	5	
(Australia) Albert Park (Melbourne)*	Australian Grand Prix (1996–2019, 2022–2026)*	29	2037
(Portugal) Algarve‡	Portuguese Grand Prix (2020–2021)‡	2	2028
(Sweden) Anderstorp	Swedish Grand Prix (1973–1978)	6	
(United States) Austin*	United States Grand Prix (2012–2019, 2021–2026)*	14	2034
(West Germany) AVUS (Berlin)	German Grand Prix (1959)	1	
(Azerbaijan) Baku*	European Grand Prix, 1 (2016); Azerbaijan Grand Prix, 8 (2017–2019, 2021–2026)*	10	2030
(Portugal) Boavista (Porto)	Portuguese Grand Prix (1958, 1960)	2	
(United Kingdom) Brands Hatch	British Grand Prix, 12 (1964, 1966, 1968, 1970, 1972, 1974, 1976, 1978, 1980, 1982, 1984, 1986); European Grand Prix, 2 (1983, 1985)	14	
(Switzerland) Bremgarten (Bern)	Swiss Grand Prix (1950–1954)	5	
(United States) Caesars Palace (Las Vegas)	Caesars Palace Grand Prix (1981–1982)	2	
(Spain) Catalunya (Barcelona)*	Spanish Grand Prix, 35 (1991–2025); Barcelona-Catalunya Grand Prix, 1 (2026)*	36	2032
(France) Charade (Clermont-Ferrand)	French Grand Prix (1965, 1969, 1970, 1972)	4	
(United States) Dallas	Dallas Grand Prix (1984)	1	
(United States) Detroit	Detroit Grand Prix (1982–1988)	7	
(France) Dijon-Prenois	French Grand Prix, 5 (1974, 1977, 1979, 1981, 1984); Swiss Grand Prix, 1 (1982)	6	
(United Kingdom) Donington	European Grand Prix (1993)	1	
(South Africa) East London	South African Grand Prix (1962–1963, 1965)	3	
(Portugal) Estoril	Portuguese Grand Prix (1984–1996)	13	
(Japan) Fuji	Japanese Grand Prix (1976–1977, 2007–2008)	4	
(India) Greater Noida	Indian Grand Prix (2011–2013)	3	
Hermanos Rodríguez (Mexico City)*	Mexican Grand Prix, 20 (1963–1970, 1986–1992, 2015–2019); Mexico City Grand Prix, 6 (2021–2026)*	26	2028
(Germany) Hockenheim	German Grand Prix (1970, 1977–1984, 1986–2006, 2008, 2010, 2012, 2014, 2016, 2018–2019)	37	
(Hungary) Hungaroring (Budapest)*	Hungarian Grand Prix (1986–2026)*	41	2032
(Italy) Imola	Italian Grand Prix, 1 (1980); San Marino Grand Prix, 26 (1981–2006); Emilia Romagna Grand Prix, 5 (2020–2022, 2024–2025)	32	
(United States) Indianapolis	Indianapolis 500, 11 (1950–1960); United States Grand Prix, 8 (2000–2007)	19	
(Brazil) Interlagos (São Paulo)*	Brazilian Grand Prix, 37 (1973–1977, 1979–1980, 1990–2019); São Paulo Grand Prix, 6 (2021–2026)*	43	2035
(Turkey) Istanbul‡	Turkish Grand Prix (2005–2011, 2020–2021)	9	2031
(Brazil) Jacarepaguá (Rio de Janeiro)	Brazilian Grand Prix (1978, 1981–1989)	10	
(Spain) Jarama	Spanish Grand Prix (1968, 1970, 1972, 1974, 1976–1979, 1981)	9	
(Saudi Arabia) Jeddah Corniche‡	Saudi Arabian Grand Prix (2021–2025)‡	5	2030
(Spain) Jerez	Spanish Grand Prix, 5 (1986–1990); European Grand Prix, 2 (1994, 1997)	7	
(South Africa) Kyalami	South African Grand Prix (1967–1980, 1982–1985, 1992–1993)	20	
(United States) Las Vegas Strip Circuit*	Las Vegas Grand Prix (2023–2025)*	3	2037
(France) Le Mans Bugatti	French Grand Prix (1967)	1	
(United States) Long Beach	United States Grand Prix West (1976–1983)	8	
(Qatar) Lusail*	Qatar Grand Prix (2021, 2023–2025)*	4	2032
(Spain) Madring*	Spanish Grand Prix (2026)*	1	2035
(France) Magny-Cours	French Grand Prix (1991–2008)	18	
Marina Bay (Singapore)*	Singapore Grand Prix (2008–2019, 2022–2026)*	17	2028
(United States) Miami International Autodrome*	Miami Grand Prix (2022–2026)*	5	2041
(Portugal) Monsanto Park (Lisbon)	Portuguese Grand Prix (1959)	1	
(Monaco) Monte Carlo*	Monaco Grand Prix (1950, 1955–2019, 2021–2026)*	72	2031
(Spain) Montjuïc (Barcelona)	Spanish Grand Prix (1969, 1971, 1973, 1975)	4	
(Canada) Montréal*	Canadian Grand Prix (1978–1986, 1988–2008, 2010–2019, 2022–2026)*	45	2031
(Italy) Monza*	Italian Grand Prix (1950–1979, 1981–2026)*	76	2031
(Canada) Mosport Park	Canadian Grand Prix (1967, 1969, 1971–1974, 1976–1977)	8	
(Italy) Mugello	Tuscan Grand Prix (2020)	1	
(Belgium) Nivelles	Belgian Grand Prix (1972, 1974)	2	
(Germany) Nürburgring	German Grand Prix, 26 (1951–1954, 1956–1958, 1961–1969, 1971–1976, 1985, 2009, 2011, 2013); European Grand Prix, 12 (1984, 1995–1996, 1999–2007); Luxembourg Grand Prix, 2 (1997–1998); Eifel Grand Prix, 1 (2020)	41	
(Argentina) Oscar y Juan Gálvez (Buenos Aires)	Argentine Grand Prix (1953–1958, 1960, 1972–1975, 1977–1981, 1995–1998)	20	
(France) Paul Ricard (Le Castellet)	French Grand Prix (1971, 1973, 1975–1976, 1978, 1980, 1982–1983, 1985–1990, 2018–2019, 2021–2022)	18	
(Spain) Pedralbes (Barcelona)	Spanish Grand Prix (1951, 1954)	2	
(Italy) Pescara	Pescara Grand Prix (1957)	1	
(United States) Phoenix	United States Grand Prix (1989–1991)	3	
(France) Reims	French Grand Prix (1950, 1951, 1953, 1954, 1956, 1958–1961, 1963, 1966)	11	
(United States) Riverside	United States Grand Prix (1960)	1	
(France) Rouen	French Grand Prix (1952, 1957, 1962, 1964, 1968)	5	
(Canada) Saint-Jovite (Mont-Tremblant)	Canadian Grand Prix (1968, 1970)	2	
(Bahrain) Sakhir‡	Bahrain Grand Prix, 21 (2004–2010, 2012–2025)‡ Sakhir Grand Prix, 1 (2020)	22	2036
(United States) Sebring	United States Grand Prix (1959)	1	
(Malaysia) Sepang (Kuala Lumpur)*	Malaysian Grand Prix, 19 (1999–2017); Bahrain Grand Prix, 1 (2026)	20	2026
(China) Shanghai*	Chinese Grand Prix (2004–2019, 2024–2026)*	19	2030
(United Kingdom) Silverstone*	British Grand Prix, 60 (1950–1954, 1956, 1958, 1960, 1963, 1965, 1967, 1969, 1971, 1973, 1975, 1977, 1979, 1981, 1983, 1985, 1987–2026)*; 70th Anniversary Grand Prix, 1 (2020)	61	2034
(Russia) Sochi	Russian Grand Prix (2014–2021)	8	
(Belgium) Spa-Francorchamps*	Belgian Grand Prix (1950–1956, 1958, 1960–1968, 1970, 1983, 1985–2002, 2004–2005, 2007–2026)*	59	2031
(Austria) Spielberg (Österreichring/ A1-Ring/ Red Bull Ring)*	Austrian Grand Prix, 38 (1970–1987, 1997–2003, 2014–2026)*; Styrian Grand Prix, 2 (2020–2021)	40	2041
(Japan) Suzuka*	Japanese Grand Prix (1987–2006, 2009–2019, 2022–2026)*	36	2029
(Spain) Valencia	European Grand Prix (2008–2012)	5	
(United States) Watkins Glen	United States Grand Prix (1961–1980)	20	
(United Arab Emirates) Yas Marina (Abu Dhabi)*	Abu Dhabi Grand Prix (2009–2025)*	17	2030
(South Korea) Yeongam	Korean Grand Prix (2010–2013)	4	
(Netherlands) Zandvoort*	Dutch Grand Prix (1952–1953, 1955, 1958–1971, 1973–1985, 2021–2026)*	36	2026
(Austria) Zeltweg	Austrian Grand Prix (1964)	1	
(Belgium) Zolder	Belgian Grand Prix (1973, 1975–1982, 1984)	10	

== Milestone races ==
=== Multiples of 100 ===
Formula One Grands Prix by multiples of 100
Race	Season	Grand Prix	Circuit	Winner	
Race	Season	Grand Prix	Circuit	Driver	Constructor
100	1961	(West Germany) German	Nürburgring	Stirling Moss (GBR)	Lotus-Climax (GBR)
200	1971	Monaco	Monte Carlo	Jackie Stewart (GBR)	Tyrrell-Ford (GBR)
300	1978	(South Africa) South African	Kyalami	Ronnie Peterson (SWE)	Lotus-Ford (GBR)
400	1984	(Austria) Austrian	Spielberg	Niki Lauda (AUT)	McLaren-TAG (GBR)
500	1990	(Australia) Australian	Adelaide	Nelson Piquet (BRA)	Benetton-Ford (GBR)
600	1997	(Argentina) Argentine	Buenos Aires	Jacques Villeneuve (CAN)	Williams-Renault (GBR)
700	2003	(Brazil) Brazilian	Interlagos	Giancarlo Fisichella (ITA)	Jordan-Ford (IRL)
800	2008	Singapore	Marina Bay	Fernando Alonso (ESP)	Renault (FRA)
900	2014	Bahrain	Sakhir	Lewis Hamilton (GBR)	Mercedes (GER)
1000	2019	(China) Chinese	Shanghai	Lewis Hamilton (GBR)	Mercedes (GER)
1100	2023	(United States) Las Vegas	Las Vegas	Max Verstappen (NED)	Red Bull Racing-Honda RBPT (AUT)

== Bibliography ==
- Hayhoe, David (1989). Kimberley Grand Prix Data Book: Formula 1 Racing Facts and Figures 1950 to Date. Sparkford, England: Haynes Publishing. ISBN 0-946132-63-1 – via Open Library.
- Granet, François; Chimits, Xavier (1994). "The race". Williams Renault Formula 1: Motor Racing Book. London, England: Dorling Kindersley. ISBN 0-7513-0109-4 – via Open Library.
- Higham, Peter (1995). The Guinness Guide to International Motor Racing. London, England: Motorbooks International. ISBN 978-0-7603-0152-4 – via Open Library.
- Hughes, Mark; Tremayne, David (2002). The Concise Encyclopedia of Formula 1. Bath, England: Parragon. ISBN 0-75258-766-8 – via Open Library.
- White, John (2008) [2007]. The Formula One Miscellany (Second ed.). London, England: Carlton Books. ISBN 978-1-84732-112-1 – via Open Library.
- Jones, Bruce (2015). "Tracks: Locations". World Formula 1 Records 2016 (Fifth ed.). London, England: SevenOaks. ISBN 978-1-78177-268-3.
- Chicane (2015). The Fastest Show on Earth: The Mammoth Book of Formula 1. London, England: Little, Brown Book Group. ISBN 978-0-7624-5622-2 – via Open Library.
- Smith, Roger (2019). Formula 1 All The Races: The First 1000. Poundbury, England: Veloce Publishing. ISBN 978-1-787115-66-8.
