= Monsanto Forest Park =

Municipal protected forest in Lisbon, Portugal

Coordinates: 38°44′24″N 9°11′11.5″W

Monsanto Park Parque de Monsanto
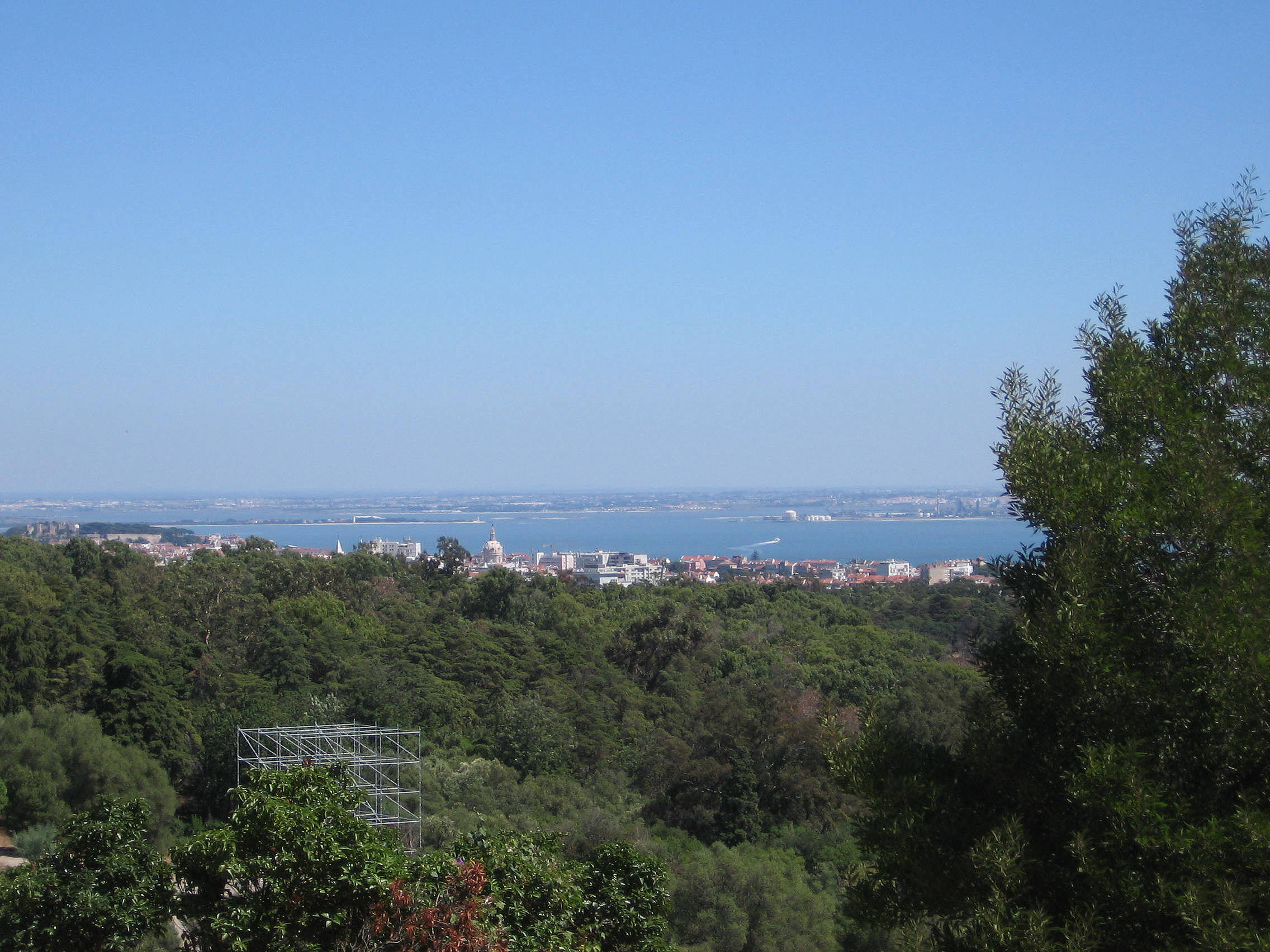
- Interactive map of Monsanto Park; Parque de Monsanto
- Type: Forest park
- Location: Monsanto Hills in Lisbon, Portugal
- Area: 2,500 acres (10 km^{2})
- Created: 1934
- Owner: Lisbon Municipality
- Operator: Câmara Municipal de Lisboa (Lisbon Municipal Council)

Monsanto Forest Park (Portuguese: Parque Florestal de Monsanto) is a municipal forest in Lisbon, Portugal, the largest green space in the city, covering over 900 hectares (2,200 acres). It offers a well diversified tree-covered area to the Portuguese capital.

Many species were introduced in the Monsanto Hills (Serra de Monsanto) during the reforesting period. Due to climate and geological characteristics, they created an ecosystem in the urban patch of Lisbon (and surrounding municipalities). The Ecological Park of Lisbon, located at Monsanto Forest Park, is a meeting point for a new contact with the environment, right in the heart of the Portuguese capital. Its main purpose is to make visitors aware of the many variables of the environment, for instance, geology, climate, flora, and fauna.

The Ecological Park, residing inside the Forest Park, has a perimeter of four kilometres, and a total area of fifty hectares, of which sixteen is fenced and thirty four is non-fenced. It spreads over Serra de Monsanto, from Alto da Serafina to the Woods of S. Domingos de Benfica, passes the farm of Marquis de Fronteira and the Lead Shooting Club of Portugal. The Ecological Park runs an Interpretation Centre, with an auditorium, a space for permanent and occasional exhibitions, and a Centre of Multimedia Resources. Quercus, the largest Portuguese non-profit national environment organization for the conservation of the natural environment, is based in Monsanto Park.

== History ==
The intensive agricultural usage of the soils led to erosion and practically to a destruction of the original vegetation. In the 1930s, the increasing demand for construction areas led Duarte Pacheco, the then Minister for the Public Works of Portugal, to resuscitate an idea from 1868: the reforesting of the then practically bare Serra de Monsanto. The regulation for Monsanto Park was put in place in 1934, and the works for replantation were carried out by farmers and prisoners from Monsanto Fort. Architect Keil do Amaral presented the first complete plan for the park, including leisure and sports areas, some of which still exist. The Ecological Park has a privileged location at Monsanto Forest Park — the largest green patch in the city of Lisbon, with almost 1000 ha. The Monsanto Park Circuit, a 5.44-kilometre (3.38 mi) race track, hosted the 1959 Formula One Portuguese Grand Prix.

=== Gallery ===
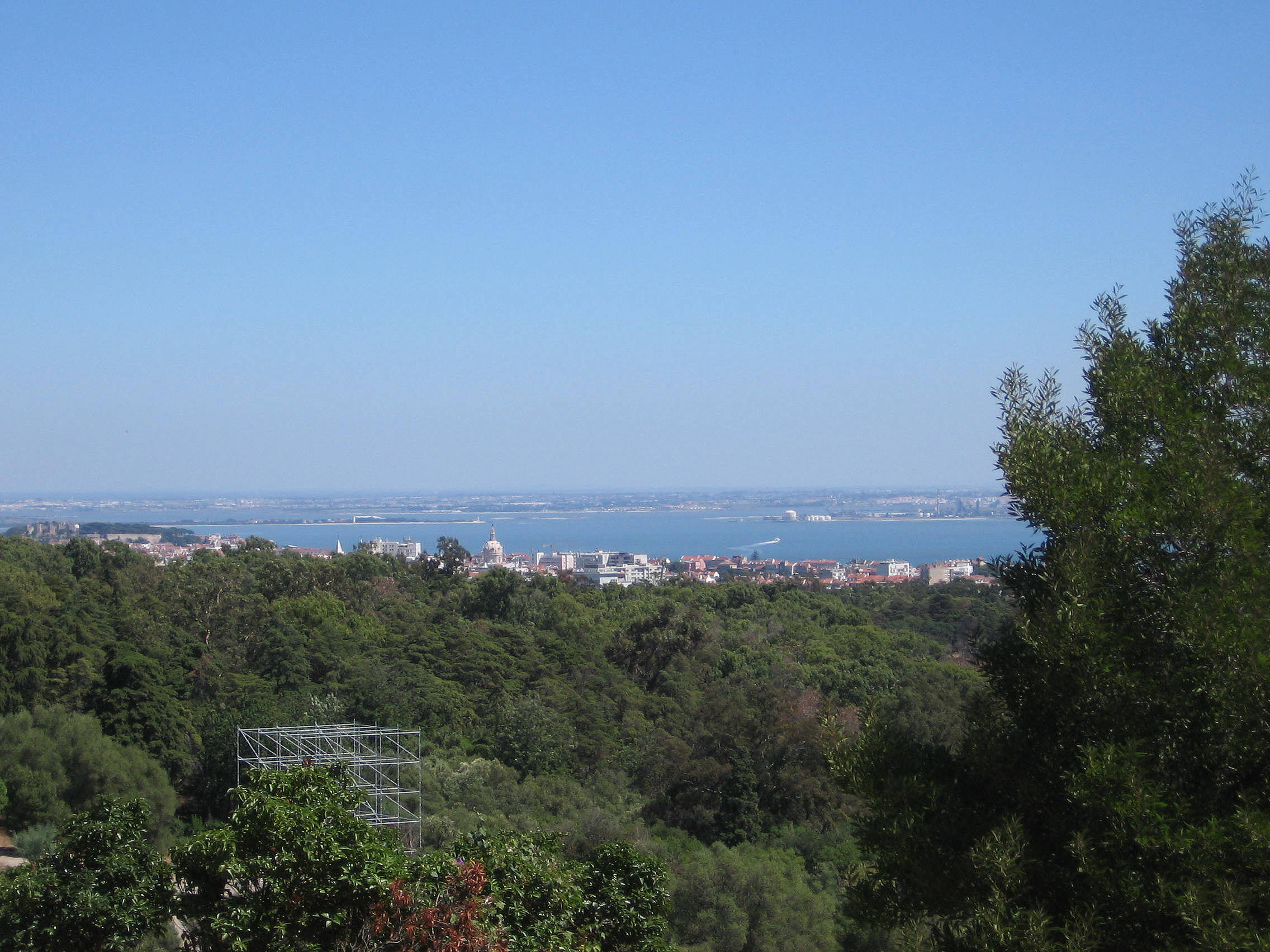
Overview of the park

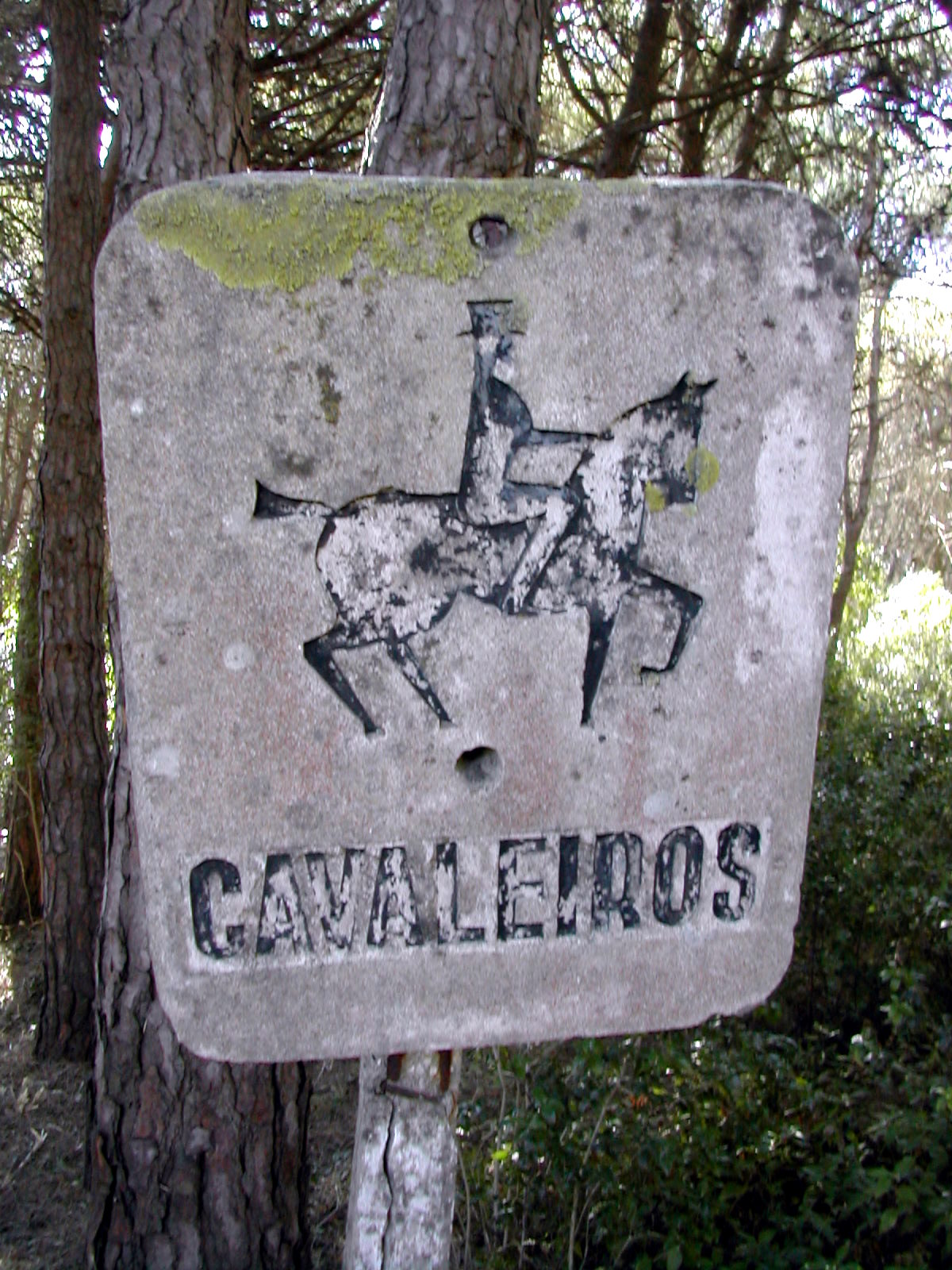
Signal of the riders trail of the original draft of Monsanto

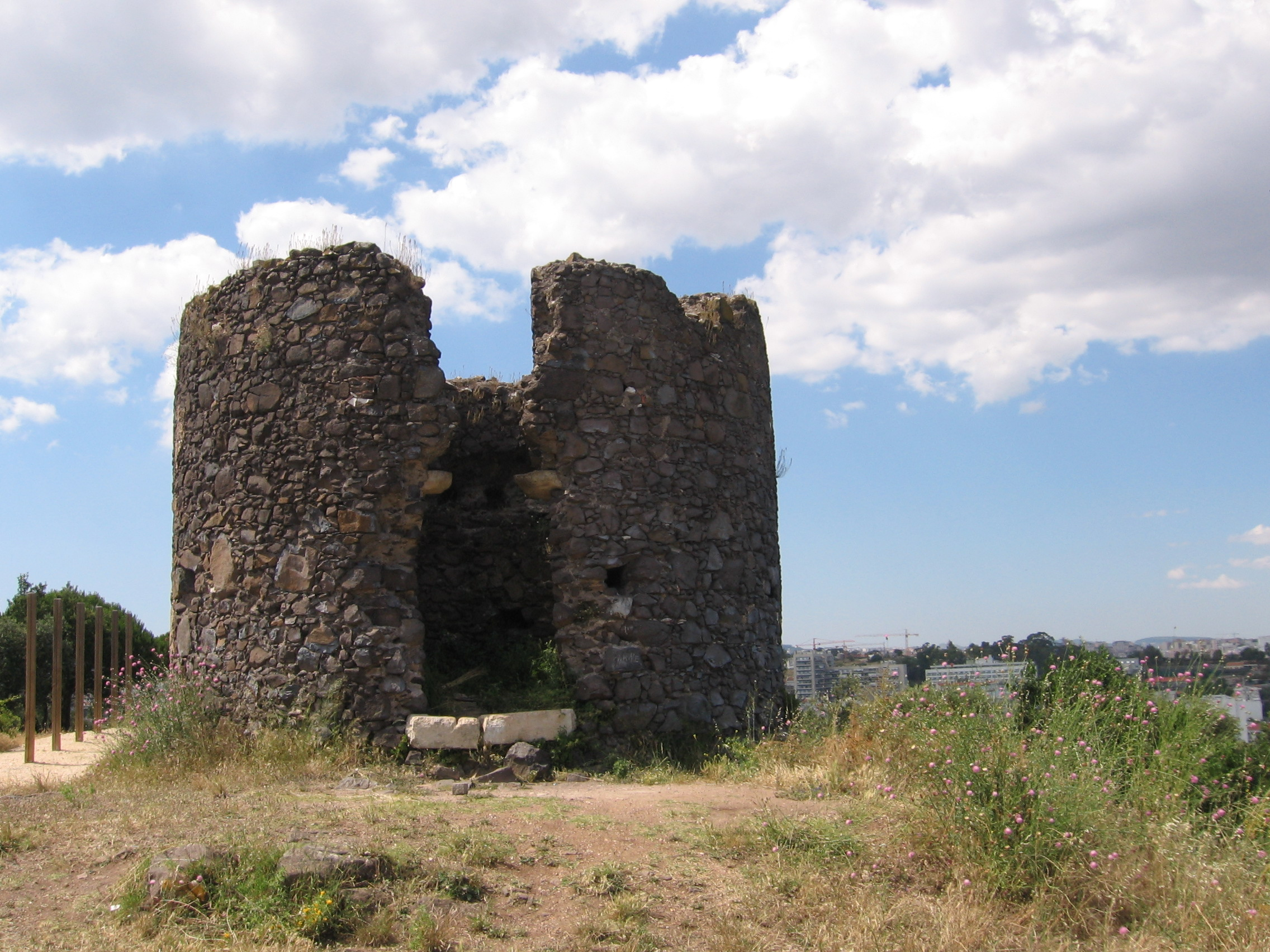
Three Crosses Mill

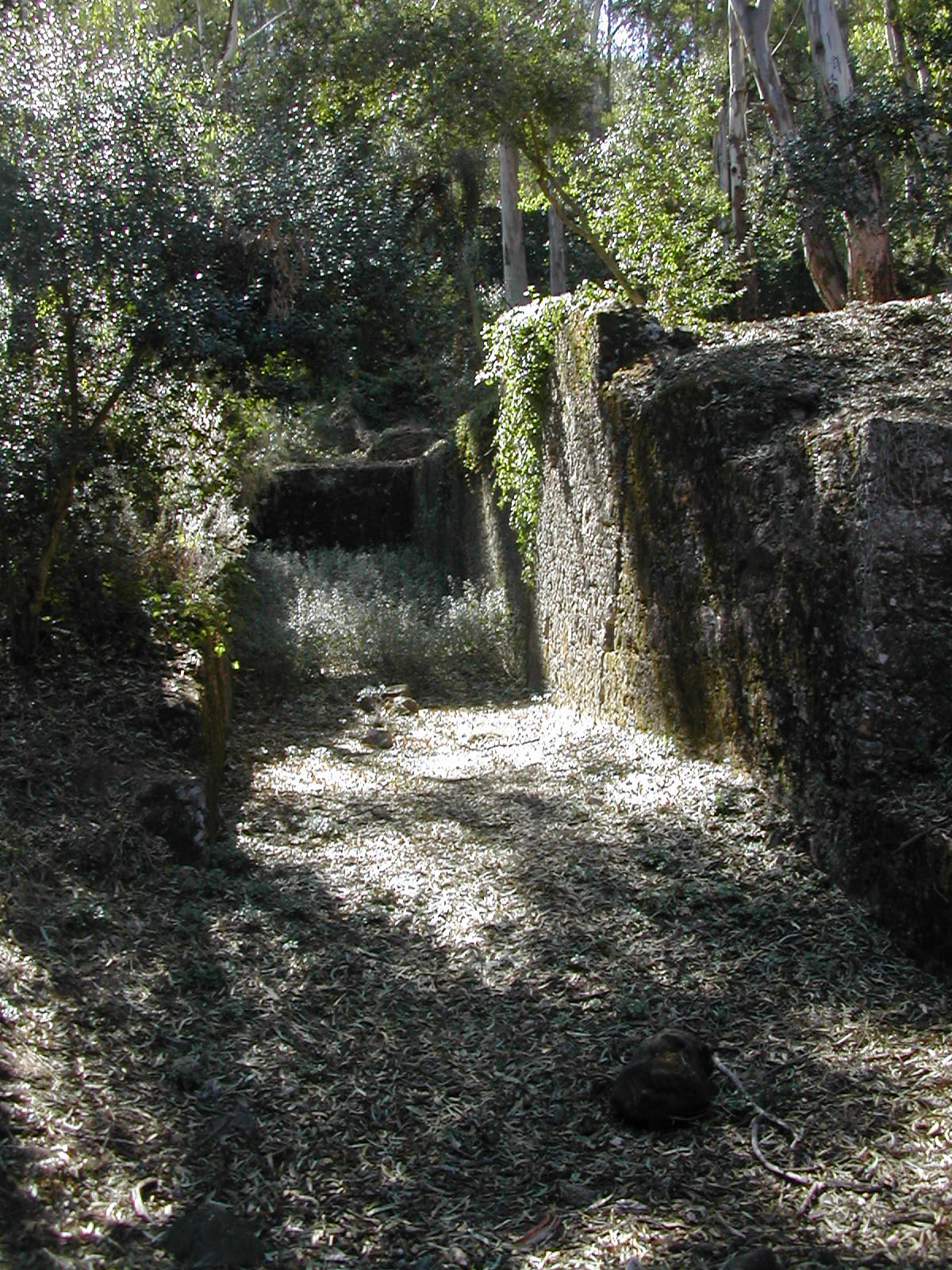
Former structure for the collection of stones

== See also ==
- Monsanto Park Circuit
