= 2020 Eifel Grand Prix =

11th round of the 2020 Formula One season

Race 11 of 17 (Note: The outbreak of the COVID-19 pandemic saw several Grands Prix cancelled or rescheduled. The revised calendar consisted of seventeen races.) in the 2020 Formula One World Championship
← Previous race	Next race →
- Layout of the Nürburgring's GP-Strecke

Race details
- Date: 11 October 2020
- Official name: Formula 1 Aramco Großer Preis der Eifel 2020
- Location: Nürburgring; Nürburg, Rhineland-Palatinate, Germany
- Course: Permanent racing facility
- Course length: 5.148 km (3.199 miles)
- Distance: 60 laps, 308.617 km (191.765 miles)
- Weather: Partly cloudy, 10 °C (50 °F)
- Attendance: 13,500

Pole position
Driver	(Finland) Valtteri Bottas	Mercedes
- Time: 1:25.269

Fastest lap
Driver	(Netherlands) Max Verstappen	Red Bull Racing-Honda
- Time: 1:28.139 on lap 60 (lap record)

Podium
First	(United Kingdom) Lewis Hamilton	Mercedes
Second	(Netherlands) Max Verstappen	Red Bull Racing-Honda
Third	(Australia) Daniel Ricciardo	Renault

The 2020 Eifel Grand Prix (officially known as the Formula 1 Aramco Großer Preis der Eifel 2020) was a Formula One motor race held on 11 October 2020 at the Nürburgring in Nürburg, Germany on the 5.1-kilometre (3.2 mi) GP-Strecke layout. It was the first Formula One race held at the Nürburgring since 2013. The race was the eleventh round of the 2020 Formula One World Championship and the first and only running in history of the Eifel Grand Prix, named for the Eifel mountains. The race was won by Lewis Hamilton from second on the grid. With the win, he equalled Michael Schumacher's record for most Grand Prix wins. As of 2026, this is the last Formula One World Championship race held in Germany.

== Background ==
=== Impact of the COVID-19 pandemic ===
The 2020 championship was heavily affected by the COVID-19 pandemic. Most of the originally planned Grands Prix were cancelled or postponed, prompting the Fédération Internationale de l'Automobile to draft a new calendar. This was the first time since the 2013 German Grand Prix that the GP-Strecke layout hosted a Formula One Grand Prix. Up to 20,000 fans were expected to attend the race with social distancing measures in place.

=== Entrants ===
The drivers and teams were initially the same as the season entry list. Ferrari Driver Academy drivers Mick Schumacher and Callum Ilott were entered to appear in the first practice session, driving for Alfa Romeo Racing in place of Antonio Giovinazzi and for Haas in place of Romain Grosjean, respectively. The first practice session was ultimately cancelled, meaning that Schumacher and Ilott were unable to participate (they would eventually make their free practice debuts separately, with Schumacher making his debut at the 2020 Abu Dhabi Grand Prix for Haas, and Ilott would make his debut at the 2021 Portuguese Grand Prix for Alfa Romeo Racing). Nico Hülkenberg replaced Lance Stroll, as he felt unwell before the third practice session and later revealed he tested positive for the coronavirus on the day of the race. Hülkenberg would not return until the 2022 Bahrain Grand Prix as a substitute for a similarly coronavirus stricken Sebastian Vettel.

=== Tyres ===
Pirelli supplied their C2, C3, and C4 compound tyres for teams to use in the race, the middle range of compounds available in terms of hardness.

== Practice ==
The first practice session on Friday began at 11:00 CEST (UTC+2). However, rain and fog prevented the cars from leaving the pit lane as conditions were unsafe for the medical helicopter to fly. With 30 minutes of the session left to go, first practice was abandoned, and no running was completed. The second practice session was due to start at 15:00 CEST on Friday, but was likewise cancelled. Mercedes driver Valtteri Bottas was fastest in third practice ahead of teammate Lewis Hamilton and Ferrari driver Charles Leclerc. Racing Point driver Lance Stroll sat out the session due to COVID-19, and later withdrew from the rest of the weekend. Stroll had previously tested negative and would not test positive until the Monday after the race.

== Qualifying ==
=== Qualifying classification ===
Pos.	No.	Driver	Constructor	Qualifying times			Final grid
Pos.	No.	Driver	Constructor	Q1	Q2	Q3	Final grid
1	77	(Finland) Valtteri Bottas	Mercedes	1:26.573	1:25.971	1:25.269	1
2	44	(United Kingdom) Lewis Hamilton	Mercedes	1:26.629	1:25.390	1:25.525	2
3	33	(Netherlands) Max Verstappen	Red Bull Racing-Honda	1:26.319	1:25.467	1:25.562	3
4	16	(Monaco) Charles Leclerc	Ferrari	1:26.857	1:26.240	1:26.035	4
5	23	(Thailand) Alexander Albon	Red Bull Racing-Honda	1:27.126	1:26.285	1:26.047	5
6	3	(Australia) Daniel Ricciardo	Renault	1:26.836	1:26.096	1:26.223	6
7	31	(France) Esteban Ocon	Renault	1:27.086	1:26.364	1:26.242	7
8	4	(United Kingdom) Lando Norris	McLaren-Renault	1:26.829	1:26.316	1:26.458	8
9	11	(Mexico) Sergio Pérez	Racing Point-BWT Mercedes	1:27.120	1:26.330	1:26.704	9
10	55	(Spain) Carlos Sainz Jr.	McLaren-Renault	1:27.378	1:26.361	1:26.709	10
11	5	(Germany) Sebastian Vettel	Ferrari	1:27.107	1:26.738	N/A	11
12	10	(France) Pierre Gasly	AlphaTauri-Honda	1:27.072	1:26.776	N/A	12
13	26	(Russia) Daniil Kvyat	AlphaTauri-Honda	1:27.285	1:26.848	N/A	13
14	99	(Italy) Antonio Giovinazzi	Alfa Romeo Racing-Ferrari	1:27.532	1:26.936	N/A	14
15	20	(Denmark) Kevin Magnussen	Haas-Ferrari	1:27.231	1:27.125	N/A	15
16	8	(France) Romain Grosjean	Haas-Ferrari	1:27.562	N/A	N/A	16
17	63	(United Kingdom) George Russell	Williams-Mercedes	1:27.564	N/A	N/A	17
18	6	(Canada) Nicholas Latifi	Williams-Mercedes	1:27.812	N/A	N/A	18
19	7	(Finland) Kimi Räikkönen	Alfa Romeo Racing-Ferrari	1:27.817	N/A	N/A	19
20	27	(Germany) Nico Hülkenberg	Racing Point-BWT Mercedes	1:28.021	N/A	N/A	20
107% time: 1:32.361

== Race ==
=== Race report ===
At the race start, Valtteri Bottas, who had started on pole position, and Mercedes teammate Lewis Hamilton battled for the lead after Hamilton produced a better start, with Bottas maintaining his position. Renault's Daniel Ricciardo passed Red Bull's Alexander Albon for fifth place, and Ricciardo's teammate Esteban Ocon fell back from seventh to ninth. On lap eight Albon became the first driver to make a pit stop, switching from the soft to the medium-compound tyres. On the following lap, Ricciardo overtook the Ferrari of Charles Leclerc at turn two for fourth place. On lap 11, Ferrari's Sebastian Vettel, running in 10th place, spun at turn one during an overtake attempt on the Alfa Romeo of Antonio Giovinazzi. He returned to the track but the spin dropped him to 13th.

On lap 13, race leader Bottas locked up his brakes and ran wide at turn one, allowing Hamilton to pass him at turn two. Bottas entered the pits for a tyre change at the end of the lap. On the same lap, Alfa Romeo's Kimi Räikkönen attempted an overtake on the 19th-placed Williams of George Russell at turn one, but understeered into the side of Russell. This caused a puncture and suspension damage for Russell, who was forced to pull over to the side of the track at the exit of turn six and retire from the race. Räikkönen was later issued a 10-second time penalty for causing the collision, which he served during his pit stop. The virtual safety car (VSC) was deployed whilst Russell's car was recovered. Hamilton was able to extend his advantage over Bottas by making his pit stop during the VSC period, as was Red Bull's Max Verstappen, who retained second place after pitting. The VSC period ended on lap 17. AlphaTauri's Daniil Kvyat locked up his brakes and went straight on at the turn 13–14 chicane, allowing Albon to pass him for 10th place; however, Albon made contact with Kvyat's front wing whilst completing the overtake, breaking it off and forcing Kvyat to complete a full lap without it before returning to the pits. Shortly afterwards, third-placed Bottas complained of power loss and fell to seventh place before entering the pits to retire from the race.

Ocon entered the pits at the end of lap 22 to retire with a hydraulics issue. On the following lap, Albon was issued a five-second time penalty for causing the collision with Kvyat but came into the pits and retired his car due to a damaged radiator. McLaren's Lando Norris began to report power loss on lap 26. Leclerc passed the AlphaTauri of Pierre Gasly for seventh place on lap 28, and was later promoted to fourth after cars ahead made their pit stops. He then battled with Racing Point's Sergio Pérez on lap 33, losing fourth place, regaining it on the following lap and then dropping to fifth again on lap 35. At this point, drivers began to make their second pit stops, with Williams' Nicholas Latifi being the first, followed by Haas' Kevin Magnussen, Leclerc, Giovinazzi, and Vettel. Norris, who was running in sixth place, suffered total power unit failure on lap 44 and pulled over to the side of the track after turn six. The safety car was deployed and those drivers who had not yet made a second pit stop did so, with the exception of Haas' Romain Grosjean, who was promoted to seventh place. The order of the top 10 was now Hamilton, Verstappen, Ricciardo, Pérez, Sainz, Leclerc, Grosjean, Gasly, Nico Hülkenberg, and Giovinazzi. The safety car remained out until lap 50 to allow lapped cars to pass. Grosjean quickly fell to 9th place after the restart, and Gasly passed Leclerc for sixth place on the following lap.

Hamilton crossed the finish line to take his 91st race win, equalling seven-time world champion Michael Schumacher's record for most Grand Prix wins. The race left Hamilton leading the drivers' championship on 230 points with teammate Bottas second on 161 and Verstappen third on 147. Räikkönen broke the record for most race starts with 323, held by Rubens Barrichello since the 2008 Monaco Grand Prix. Ricciardo became the first Renault driver to finish on the podium since Nick Heidfeld at the 2011 Malaysian Grand Prix; it was also his first podium since he won the 2018 Monaco Grand Prix. In his career's final points finish, Grosjean scored a 9th-place finish for Haas.

During the post-race interviews, Mick Schumacher gave Hamilton his father's race-worn Mercedes helmet from 2012 as a reward from the Schumacher family for equalling the number of wins. Both Hamilton and Verstappen complained about the length of the safety car period, arguing that it was unnecessarily too long.

=== Race classification ===
Pos.	No.	Driver	Constructor	Laps	Time/Retired	Grid	Points
1	44	(United Kingdom) Lewis Hamilton	Mercedes	60	1:35:49.641	2	25
2	33	(Netherlands) Max Verstappen	Red Bull Racing-Honda	60	+4.470	3	19^{1}
3	3	(Australia) Daniel Ricciardo	Renault	60	+14.613	6	15
4	11	(Mexico) Sergio Pérez	Racing Point-BWT Mercedes	60	+16.070	9	12
5	55	(Spain) Carlos Sainz Jr.	McLaren-Renault	60	+21.905	10	10
6	10	(France) Pierre Gasly	AlphaTauri-Honda	60	+22.766	12	8
7	16	(Monaco) Charles Leclerc	Ferrari	60	+30.814	4	6
8	27	(Germany) Nico Hülkenberg	Racing Point-BWT Mercedes	60	+32.596	20	4
9	8	(France) Romain Grosjean	Haas-Ferrari	60	+39.081	16	2
10	99	(Italy) Antonio Giovinazzi	Alfa Romeo Racing-Ferrari	60	+40.035	14	1
11	5	(Germany) Sebastian Vettel	Ferrari	60	+40.810	11	
12	7	(Finland) Kimi Räikkönen	Alfa Romeo Racing-Ferrari	60	+41.476	19	
13	20	(Denmark) Kevin Magnussen	Haas-Ferrari	60	+49.585	15	
14	6	(Canada) Nicholas Latifi	Williams-Mercedes	60	+54.449	18	
15	26	(Russia) Daniil Kvyat	AlphaTauri-Honda	60	+55.588	13	
Ret	4	(United Kingdom) Lando Norris	McLaren-Renault	42	Power unit	8	
Ret	23	(Thailand) Alexander Albon	Red Bull Racing-Honda	23	Radiator^{2}	5	
Ret	31	(France) Esteban Ocon	Renault	22	Hydraulics	7	
Ret	77	(Finland) Valtteri Bottas	Mercedes	18	Power unit	1	
Ret	63	(United Kingdom) George Russell	Williams-Mercedes	12	Collision	17	
Fastest lap: (Netherlands) Max Verstappen (Red Bull Racing-Honda) – 1:28.139 (lap 60)

Notes

- ^1 – Includes one point for fastest lap.
- ^2 – Alexander Albon received a five-second time penalty for causing a collision with Daniil Kvyat, but it was unapplied as he retired from the race.

== Championship standings after the race ==
Drivers' Championship standings

	Pos.	Driver	Points
	1	(United Kingdom) Lewis Hamilton	230
	2	(Finland) Valtteri Bottas	161
	3	(Netherlands) Max Verstappen	147
2	4	(Australia) Daniel Ricciardo	78
4	5	(Mexico) Sergio Pérez	68

Constructors' Championship standings

	Pos.	Constructor	Points
	1	(Germany) Mercedes	391
	2	(Austria) Red Bull Racing-Honda	211
1	3	(United Kingdom) Racing Point-BWT Mercedes	120 (Note: Racing Point were deducted 15 points after a protest from Renault was upheld regarding the legality of their car.)
1	4	(United Kingdom) McLaren-Renault	116
	5	(France) Renault	114

- Note: Only the top five positions are included for both sets of standings.

== Notes ==
Previous race: 2020 Russian Grand Prix	FIA Formula One World Championship; 2020 season	Next race: 2020 Portuguese Grand Prix
Previous race: N/A; Previous race at the Nürburgring: 2013 German Grand Prix	Eifel Grand Prix	Next race: N/A
