= 2020 Portuguese Grand Prix =

Formula 1 race in Portugal

Race 12 of 17 (Note: The outbreak of the COVID-19 pandemic saw several Grands Prix cancelled or rescheduled. The revised calendar consisted of seventeen races.) in the 2020 Formula One World Championship
← Previous race	Next race →
- Layout of the Algarve International Circuit

Race details
- Date: 25 October 2020
- Official name: Formula 1 Heineken Grande Prémio de Portugal 2020
- Location: Autódromo Internacional do Algarve; Portimão, Algarve, Portugal
- Course: Permanent racing facility
- Course length: 4.653 km (2.891 miles)
- Distance: 66 laps, 306.826 km (190.653 miles)
- Weather: Cloudy
- Attendance: 27,000

Pole position
Driver	(United Kingdom) Lewis Hamilton	Mercedes
- Time: 1:16.652

Fastest lap
Driver	(United Kingdom) Lewis Hamilton	Mercedes
- Time: 1:18.750 on lap 63 (lap record)

Podium
First	(United Kingdom) Lewis Hamilton	Mercedes
Second	(Finland) Valtteri Bottas	Mercedes
Third	(Netherlands) Max Verstappen	Red Bull Racing-Honda

The 2020 Portuguese Grand Prix (officially known as the Formula 1 Heineken Grande Prémio de Portugal 2020) was a Formula One motor race that was held on 25 October 2020 at the Algarve International Circuit in Portimão, Portugal. It was the first Portuguese Grand Prix held since 1996 and the first time held at the Algarve International Circuit. The race was the twelfth round of the 2020 Formula One World Championship.

Lewis Hamilton's victory put him ahead of Michael Schumacher for most victories in Formula One with 92.

== Background ==
=== Impact of the COVID-19 pandemic ===
The 2020 Formula One World Championship was heavily affected by the COVID-19 pandemic. Most of the originally planned Grands Prix were cancelled or postponed, prompting the FIA to draft a new calendar. The Portuguese Grand Prix did not feature on the original 2020 schedule, but was added in July 2020 in order to maximise the number of races in the season.

Up to 45,000 fans were initially expected to attend the race. However, due to a surge of cases attributed to the COVID-19 pandemic in the country, the number of fans allowed to attend the race was later reduced to 27,500.

=== Entrants ===
Ten teams (each representing a different constructor) each entered two drivers. The drivers and teams were the same as those on the season entry list with no additional stand-in drivers for either the race or practice.

=== Tyres ===
Sole Formula One tyre manufacturer Pirelli brought their C1, C2 and C3 compound tyres for teams to use in the race, the three hardest compounds available. Pirelli also tested the 2021 tyre compounds during the first 30 minutes of the second practice session.

=== Other ===
Former Renault and Caterham driver Vitaly Petrov was given the role of driver steward for the weekend, however was required to depart the role during the weekend following the death of his father. Bruno Correia, the Safety Car driver for Formula E and the World Touring Car Cup and a local to Portimão, took his place for the remainder of the weekend.

== Practice ==
The first practice session ran without incidents and ended with Valtteri Bottas fastest ahead of Mercedes teammate Lewis Hamilton and Red Bull driver Max Verstappen. The second practice session saw two red flags; the first when Pierre Gasly's AlphaTauri caught fire, the second when Lance Stroll and Verstappen collided. The session ended with Bottas fastest ahead of Verstappen and McLaren's Lando Norris. The race stewards investigated the Stroll–Verstappen collision and took no action. Following the collision, Verstappen referred to Stroll as a "mongol" on the team radio to his engineer, a comment which was condemned by the Mongolian government as being offensive. The third practice session was red flagged in the final minute of the session after Sebastian Vettel ran over a drain cover. which subsequently came loose. The session ended with Bottas fastest ahead of Hamilton and Verstappen.

== Qualifying ==
The start of qualifying was delayed to allow track repairs to be completed. The repairs were deemed necessary after a drain cover came loose at the end of the final practice session.

=== Qualifying classification ===
Pos.	No.	Driver	Constructor	Qualifying times			Final grid
Pos.	No.	Driver	Constructor	Q1	Q2	Q3	Final grid
1	44	(United Kingdom) Lewis Hamilton	Mercedes	1:16.828	1:16.824	1:16.652	1
2	77	(Finland) Valtteri Bottas	Mercedes	1:16.945	1:16.466	1:16.754	2
3	33	(Netherlands) Max Verstappen	Red Bull Racing-Honda	1:16.879	1:17.038	1:16.904	3
4	16	(Monaco) Charles Leclerc	Ferrari	1:17.421	1:17.367	1:17.090	4
5	11	(Mexico) Sergio Pérez	Racing Point-BWT Mercedes	1:17.370	1:17.129	1:17.223	5
6	23	(Thailand) Alexander Albon	Red Bull Racing-Honda	1:17.435	1:17.411	1:17.437	6
7	55	(Spain) Carlos Sainz Jr.	McLaren-Renault	1:17.627	1:17.183	1:17.520	7
8	4	(United Kingdom) Lando Norris	McLaren-Renault	1:17.547	1:17.321	1:17.525	8
9	10	(France) Pierre Gasly	AlphaTauri-Honda	1:17.209	1:17.367	1:17.803	9
10	3	(Australia) Daniel Ricciardo	Renault	1:17.621	1:17.481	No time	10
11	31	(France) Esteban Ocon	Renault	1:17.775	1:17.614	N/A	11
12	18	(Canada) Lance Stroll	Racing Point-BWT Mercedes	1:17.667	1:17.626	N/A	12
13	26	(Russia) Daniil Kvyat	AlphaTauri-Honda	1:17.841	1:17.728	N/A	13
14	63	(United Kingdom) George Russell	Williams-Mercedes	1:17.931	1:17.788	N/A	14
15	5	(Germany) Sebastian Vettel	Ferrari	1:17.446	1:17.919	N/A	15
16	7	(Finland) Kimi Räikkönen	Alfa Romeo Racing-Ferrari	1:18.201	N/A	N/A	16
17	99	(Italy) Antonio Giovinazzi	Alfa Romeo Racing-Ferrari	1:18.323	N/A	N/A	17
18	8	(France) Romain Grosjean	Haas-Ferrari	1:18.364	N/A	N/A	18
19	20	(Denmark) Kevin Magnussen	Haas-Ferrari	1:18.508	N/A	N/A	19
20	6	(Canada) Nicholas Latifi	Williams-Mercedes	1:18.777	N/A	N/A	20
107% time: 1:22.205

== Race ==
On the first lap, Pérez and Verstappen made contact, forcing the former to pit and dropping him down the order. Pérez would eventually recover to finish seventh. The opening few laps of the race were chaotic as the drivers who started on the medium tyres (Hamilton, Bottas, and Leclerc) fell behind those who started on the soft tyre, and so after the second lap Sainz was leading the race from seventh on the grid until being passed by the faster cars from lap 6 onwards. On lap 18, Stroll tried to pass Norris around the outside of turn 1, but Stroll misjudged the manoeuvre and collided with Norris resulting in a 5-second penalty for Stroll.

Hamilton took his 92nd race win, passing seven-time world champion Michael Schumacher's record for most Grand Prix wins. He finished ahead of his teammate Bottas by 25.592s, the second-biggest winning margin of the season, and Verstappen in 3rd position, making his 40th appearance on the podium.

=== Race classification ===
Pos.	No.	Driver	Constructor	Laps	Time/Retired	Grid	Points
1	44	(United Kingdom) Lewis Hamilton	Mercedes	66	1:29:56.828	1	26^{1}
2	77	(Finland) Valtteri Bottas	Mercedes	66	+25.592	2	18
3	33	(Netherlands) Max Verstappen	Red Bull Racing-Honda	66	+34.508	3	15
4	16	(Monaco) Charles Leclerc	Ferrari	66	+1:05.312	4	12
5	10	(France) Pierre Gasly	AlphaTauri-Honda	65	+1 lap	9	10
6	55	(Spain) Carlos Sainz Jr.	McLaren-Renault	65	+1 lap	7	8
7	11	(Mexico) Sergio Pérez	Racing Point-BWT Mercedes	65	+1 lap	5	6
8	31	(France) Esteban Ocon	Renault	65	+1 lap	11	4
9	3	(Australia) Daniel Ricciardo	Renault	65	+1 lap	10	2
10	5	(Germany) Sebastian Vettel	Ferrari	65	+1 lap	15	1
11	7	(Finland) Kimi Räikkönen	Alfa Romeo Racing-Ferrari	65	+1 lap	16	
12	23	(Thailand) Alexander Albon	Red Bull Racing-Honda	65	+1 lap	6	
13	4	(United Kingdom) Lando Norris	McLaren-Renault	65	+1 lap	8	
14	63	(United Kingdom) George Russell	Williams-Mercedes	65	+1 lap	14	
15	99	(Italy) Antonio Giovinazzi	Alfa Romeo Racing-Ferrari	65	+1 lap	17	
16	20	(Denmark) Kevin Magnussen	Haas-Ferrari	65	+1 lap	19	
17	8	(France) Romain Grosjean	Haas-Ferrari	65	+1 lap^{2}	18	
18	6	(Canada) Nicholas Latifi	Williams-Mercedes	64	+2 laps	20	
19	26	(Russia) Daniil Kvyat	AlphaTauri-Honda	64	+2 laps	13	
Ret	18	(Canada) Lance Stroll	Racing Point-BWT Mercedes	51	Collision damage	12	
Fastest lap: (United Kingdom) Lewis Hamilton (Mercedes) – 1:18.750 (lap 63)

Notes

- ^1 – Includes one point for fastest lap.
- ^2 – Romain Grosjean finished 16th on the track, but received a five-second time penalty for exceeding track limits.

== Championship standings after the race ==
Drivers' Championship standings

	Pos.	Driver	Points
	1	(United Kingdom) **Lewis Hamilton***	256
	2	(Finland) **Valtteri Bottas***	179
	3	(Netherlands) **Max Verstappen***	162
	4	(Australia) Daniel Ricciardo	80
3	5	(Monaco) Charles Leclerc	75

Constructors' Championship standings

Pos.	Constructor	Points
1	(Germany) **Mercedes***	435
2	(Austria) **Red Bull Racing-Honda***	226
3	(United Kingdom) Racing Point-BWT Mercedes	126 (Note: Racing Point was deducted 15 points after a protest from Renault regarding the legality of their car was upheld.)
4	(United Kingdom) McLaren-Renault	124
5	(France) Renault	120

- Note: Only the top five positions are included for both sets of standings.
- Competitors in bold and marked with an asterisk still had a mathematical chance of winning the Championship.

== Notes ==
Previous race: 2020 Eifel Grand Prix	FIA Formula One World Championship; 2020 season	Next race: 2020 Emilia Romagna Grand Prix
Previous race: 1996 Portuguese Grand Prix	Portuguese Grand Prix	Next race: 2021 Portuguese Grand Prix
