= 1997 European Grand Prix =

Final race of the 1997 Formula One season

Race 17 of 17 in the 1997 Formula One World Championship
← Previous race	Next race →

Race details
- Date: 26 October 1997
- Official name: XLII European Grand Prix
- Location: Circuito Permanente de Jerez, Jerez, Spain
- Course: Permanent racing facility
- Course length: 4.428 km (2.748 miles)
- Distance: 69 laps, 305.532 km (189.612 miles)
- Weather: Sunny with temperatures reaching up to 25 °C (77 °F)

Pole position
Driver	(Canada) Jacques Villeneuve	Williams-Renault
- Time: 1:21.072

Fastest lap
Driver	(Germany) Heinz-Harald Frentzen	Williams-Renault
- Time: 1:23.135 on lap 30 (lap record)

Podium
First	(Finland) Mika Häkkinen	McLaren-Mercedes
Second	(United Kingdom) David Coulthard	McLaren-Mercedes
Third	(Canada) Jacques Villeneuve	Williams-Renault

The 1997 European Grand Prix (formally the XLII European Grand Prix) was a Formula One motor race held on 26 October 1997 at the Circuito Permanente de Jerez, Spain. Originally scheduled as the Portuguese Grand Prix at the Estoril circuit, it was moved when Estoril's management had financial difficulties. It was the 17th and final race of the 1997 FIA Formula One World Championship. The 69-lap race was won by Mika Häkkinen in a McLaren, his first Formula One race victory. His teammate David Coulthard finished second and Williams driver Jacques Villeneuve took third, which was sufficient for him to win the World Championship.

Michael Schumacher, driving for Ferrari, had led the championship by a single point ahead of Villeneuve going into the race. During the race, Villeneuve and Schumacher collided while battling for the lead and the resulting damage to Schumacher's car forced him to retire. The blame for the incident was later attributed to Schumacher by the sport's governing body, the FIA, and he was stripped of his second-place finish in the championship. Schumacher's tactics were widely criticised by the media, including publications based in his home country of Germany, and in Ferrari's home country of Italy.

Following the race, Williams and McLaren were accused of colluding to decide the finishing order. Villeneuve stated that "it was better to let them through and win the World Championship". The FIA determined there was no evidence to support the claims, and dismissed the accusations. This is the last World Championship Grand Prix to be held in Jerez and the last season finale to be held on the European continent to date. Häkkinen's victory was the first victory for a Finnish driver in the Formula One World Championship in 12 years since Keke Rosberg won the 1985 Australian Grand Prix; it also kicked off a series of race wins that saw the Finn win the 1998 and 1999 championships.

Häkkinen and Coulthard's first and second-place finishes ensured the McLaren team scored their first one-two finish since the 1991 Japanese Grand Prix and made the Woking based team the only team to score a 1-2 finish during any of the 1997 Grands Prix. This was the last race for Gerhard Berger, who had won 10 times and had been competing in Formula One since 1984, and Ukyo Katayama. This was also the last Grand Prix until the 2009 Australian Grand Prix where slick tyres were used, as grooved tyres would be used in the sport from the start of the 1998 season until the end of the 2008 season. This race was also the only time during the 1997 season that Villeneuve stood on the podium without being the race winner, the other seven of eight podiums Villeneuve achieved that season all being wins.

== Background ==
The 1997 European Grand Prix was the final round of the 1997 Formula One World Championship and occurred at the 4.428 km (2.751 mi) Circuito de Jerez on 26 October 1997. Originally scheduled as the Portuguese Grand Prix at the Estoril Circuit, the race was moved to the Jerez Circuit when Estoril's management had financial difficulties. The race was added to the schedule after Japan because engine suppliers Renault did not want their last Formula One race to be in Japan.

Heading into the final race of the season, two drivers were still in contention for the World Drivers' Championship, despite Ferrari driver Michael Schumacher driving the inferior car, perhaps not even the second-fastest car on the grid. Schumacher was leading with 78 points; Williams driver Jacques Villeneuve was second with 77 points, one point behind Schumacher. Behind Schumacher and Villeneuve in the Drivers' Championship, Heinz-Harald Frentzen was third on 41 points in the other Williams, with Jean Alesi and David Coulthard on 36 and 30 points, respectively. Villeneuve had won two more races than Schumacher during the season, meaning that in the event of a tie on points, the rules stated Villeneuve would be world champion.

Villeneuve had to finish the race in a points-scoring position (points were awarded for drivers finishing in sixth place or higher) and ahead of Schumacher to become World Drivers' Champion. Schumacher would be world champion if he finished ahead of Villeneuve, or if Villeneuve failed to score any points by finishing lower than sixth or not completing the race. In the World Constructors' Championship, Williams led with 118 points and Ferrari were second on 100. Williams had therefore clinched the constructors' title before the race, as even if Ferrari finished first and second in the race, thereby taking 16 points, and both Williams cars failed to score a point, they could not beat Williams.

Following the Japanese Grand Prix on 12 October, the teams conducted testing sessions at various locations around the world. Williams, Benetton, Sauber, Jordan and McLaren conducted at a test session at the Silverstone Circuit. Williams, Sauber and Jordan tested using 1998-spec cars, in preparation for the 1998 season. Arrows conducted testing at the Circuit de Nevers Magny-Cours circuit, performing wet weather tyre development with tyre suppliers Bridgestone with the circuit flooded to simulate wet weather conditions. Prost conducted testing at Circuit de Catalunya and performed tyre testing for Bridgestone, as well as testing their 1998-specification car. Ferrari remained at the Suzuka Circuit testing an electronic differential used by driver Eddie Irvine at the previous race.

== Practice and qualifying ==
Four practice sessions were held before the Sunday race—two on Friday from 11:00 to 12:00 and 13:00 to 14:00 CEST (UTC+2), and two on Saturday morning held from 09:00 to 09:45 and from 10:15 to 11:00 CEST. In the first two practice sessions, Prost driver Olivier Panis set the fastest time with a lap of 1 minute and 22.735 seconds, one-tenth of a second faster than Arrows driver Damon Hill. Villeneuve and Rubens Barrichello were third and fourth. Mika Häkkinen and Coulthard respectively set the fifth and eighth-fastest times for McLaren; they were separated by Frentzen and Alesi. Michael Schumacher and Ralf Schumacher completed the top ten. In the final two practice sessions, Coulthard set the fastest lap with a time of 1:20.738; Häkkinen finished with the second-fastest time. The Williams drivers were quicker, with Villeneuve in third and Frentzen in sixth. Panis slipped to fourth ahead of Gerhard Berger, their best times one-tenth of a second apart. They were ahead of Stewart driver Jan Magnussen, Shinji Nakano for Prost, Hill, and Alesi.

The qualifying session was held on Saturday afternoon and lasted one-hour between 13:00 to 14:00 CEST, each driver was allowed up to twelve timed laps, with their fastest lap used to determine their grid position. Cars were timed using a TAG Heuer timing system, which measured to an accuracy of one-thousandth of a second. At the end of the session, the three fastest drivers had all set the same laptime, the first time this had happened in the history of the World Championship. Jacques Villeneuve was first to set a time of 1:21.072, fourteen minutes into the one hour session. A further fourteen minutes later, Michael Schumacher posted an identical time. With nine minutes of the session remaining, Heinz-Harald Frentzen crossed the line, again with a time of 1:21.072. Under the regulations, in the event of drivers setting equal times in qualifying, the order in which the times were set is considered, with the first driver to set the time given precedence. Villeneuve was awarded pole position on the starting grid for the race, with Schumacher second and Frentzen third. Fourth place on the grid went to the reigning World Champion, Hill, in his Arrows, with a time of 1:21.130, 0.058 seconds behind the time of the leading three. Hill had been on course to get pole position but had to slow towards the end of the lap because of yellow flags due to an incident involving Ukyo Katayama's Minardi. Villeneuve's pole position was the last for a Canadian driver in Formula One until Lance Stroll at the 2020 Turkish Grand Prix.

=== Qualifying classification ===
Pos	No.	Driver	Constructor	Time	Gap
1	3	(Canada) Jacques Villeneuve	Williams-Renault	1:21.072	
2	5	(Germany) Michael Schumacher	Ferrari	1:21.072	+0.000
3	4	(Germany) Heinz-Harald Frentzen	Williams-Renault	1:21.072	+0.000
4	1	(United Kingdom) Damon Hill	Arrows-Yamaha	1:21.130	+0.058
5	9	(Finland) Mika Häkkinen	McLaren-Mercedes	1:21.369	+0.297
6	10	(United Kingdom) David Coulthard	McLaren-Mercedes	1:21.476	+0.404
7	6	(United Kingdom) Eddie Irvine	Ferrari	1:21.610	+0.538
8	8	(Austria) Gerhard Berger	Benetton-Renault	1:21.656	+0.584
9	14	(France) Olivier Panis	Prost-Mugen-Honda	1:21.735	+0.663
10	7	(France) Jean Alesi	Benetton-Renault	1:22.011	+0.939
11	23	(Denmark) Jan Magnussen	Stewart-Ford	1:22.167	+1.095
12	22	(Brazil) Rubens Barrichello	Stewart-Ford	1:22.222	+1.150
13	2	(Brazil) Pedro Diniz	Arrows-Yamaha	1:22.234	+1.162
14	16	(United Kingdom) Johnny Herbert	Sauber-Petronas	1:22.263	+1.191
15	15	(Japan) Shinji Nakano	Prost-Mugen-Honda	1:22.351	+1.279
16	11	(Germany) Ralf Schumacher	Jordan-Peugeot	1:22.740	+1.668
17	12	(Italy) Giancarlo Fisichella	Jordan-Peugeot	1:22.804	+1.732
18	17	(Argentina) Norberto Fontana	Sauber-Petronas	1:23.281	+2.209
19	20	(Japan) Ukyo Katayama	Minardi-Hart	1:23.409	+2.337
20	21	(Brazil) Tarso Marques	Minardi-Hart	1:23.854	+2.782
21	19	(Finland) Mika Salo	Tyrrell-Ford	1:24.222	+3.150
22	18	(Netherlands) Jos Verstappen	Tyrrell-Ford	1:24.301	+3.229
107% time: 1:26.747

== Warm-up ==
A half an hour warm-up session took place on Sunday morning for teams to set-up their cars for the race later that day. A majority of the teams appeared to use the soft compound tyres except for Jordan who were using the harder tyre compound. Häkkinen lapped fastest with a time of 1:23.016 ahead of Berger in second position and Panis in third. The top ten was completed by Coulthard, Villeneuve, Herbert, Michael Schumacher, Frentzen, Nakano, and Hill. There were no incidents during the session.

== Race ==
The race took place in the afternoon, starting at 14:00 CET (UTC+1), in dry and sunny weather. Villeneuve started the race in pole position, with Schumacher in second. Just a few moments before the start of the race, a blue liquid came out of Villeneuve's Williams; however, this did not influence his car during the race. Schumacher's getaway at the start was better than Villeneuve's and he had taken the lead by the time they reached the first corner. Schumacher led 40 of the first 47 laps of the race. Frentzen also got a better start than Villeneuve and overtook him for second position. Under the orders of the Williams team, Frentzen let teammate Villeneuve past on lap eight. On the 12th lap, Pedro Diniz's race ended early when he spun and stalled. Schumacher made his first pit-stop on lap 22 and Villeneuve made his first stop the following lap. Both retained their positions. During the first round of pitstops the McLarens swapped places with Coulthard leading Häkkinen and Frentzen dropped to fifth position behind both of them. The order of the leaders after the second round of pit stops on lap 43 and lap 44 remained the same but with Villeneuve closer to Schumacher.

Villeneuve went into lap 48 less than a second behind Schumacher. Partway through the lap he attempted to overtake Schumacher at the sharp, right-hand Dry Sac corner. Braking later than Schumacher, Villeneuve held the inside line and was ahead on the track when Schumacher turned in on him resulting in a collision with his front-right wheel and Villeneuve's left-hand sidepod. ITV's pit lane reporter James Allen stated that onboard footage shows Schumacher twitching his steering wheel left before turning right into Villeneuve. Martin Brundle, in the commentary box alongside Murray Walker, immediately observed that Schumacher's move had been deliberate, saying: "I don't think... That didn't work. That didn't work, Michael. You hit the wrong part of him, my friend. I don't think that will cause Villeneuve a problem." On French television channel TF1, former Williams driver Jacques Laffite reacted with curse words, live on television, calling Schumacher "an idiot." (Note: French: Quel con, lit. "What an idiot") The right-front wheel of Schumacher's Ferrari hit the left radiator pod of Villeneuve's Williams—unlike the collision with Hill at the 1994 Australian Grand Prix, where Schumacher inflicted damage on Hill's suspension—and caused Schumacher to retire. Villeneuve described the incident after the race. He said: "The car felt very strange. The hit was very hard. It was not a small thing." He continued but damage to the mounts on his car's battery meant he was slower than the cars behind him.

At the time of the incident, there were 22 laps of the race remaining. The slower pace of Villeneuve's car meant that on the last lap, he had been caught by both McLarens, Häkkinen having regained second place from Coulthard under team orders. After the race, Villeneuve stated: "I did not fight then. It was better to let them through and win the World Championship. It is a good exchange." Berger in fourth place (in what transpired to be his final Grand Prix) was also catching Villeneuve but he did not pass before crossing the finish line. The final margin between Villeneuve and Berger was 0.116 seconds. Villeneuve later said that had he realised that it was Berger behind him, he would have let him through so that Berger would have finished on the podium in his last race. Third place meant Villeneuve finished ahead of Schumacher in the Drivers' Championship by three points, and became World Champion. Häkkinen's victory was the first of his career. It also meant the season ended with Villeneuve and Schumacher never sharing a podium.

=== Race classification ===
Pos	No.	Driver	Constructor	Tyre	Laps	Time/Retired	Grid	Points
1	9	(Finland) Mika Häkkinen	McLaren-Mercedes	G	69	1:38:57.771	5	10
2	10	(United Kingdom) David Coulthard	McLaren-Mercedes	G	69	+1.654	6	6
3	3	(Canada) Jacques Villeneuve	Williams-Renault	G	69	+1.803	1	4
4	8	(Austria) Gerhard Berger	Benetton-Renault	G	69	+1.919	8	3
5	6	(United Kingdom) Eddie Irvine	Ferrari	G	69	+3.789	7	2
6	4	(Germany) Heinz-Harald Frentzen	Williams-Renault	G	69	+4.537	3	1
7	14	(France) Olivier Panis	Prost-Mugen-Honda	B	69	+1:07.145	9	
8	16	(United Kingdom) Johnny Herbert	Sauber-Petronas	G	69	+1:12.961	14	
9	23	(Denmark) Jan Magnussen	Stewart-Ford	B	69	+1:17.487	11	
10	15	(Japan) Shinji Nakano	Prost-Mugen-Honda	B	69	+1:18.215	15	
11	12	(Italy) Giancarlo Fisichella	Jordan-Peugeot	G	68	+1 lap	17	
12	19	(Finland) Mika Salo	Tyrrell-Ford	G	68	+1 lap	21	
13	7	(France) Jean Alesi	Benetton-Renault	G	68	+1 lap	10	
14	17	(Argentina) Norberto Fontana	Sauber-Petronas	G	68	+1 lap	18	
15	21	(Brazil) Tarso Marques	Minardi-Hart	B	68	+1 lap	20	
16	18	(Netherlands) Jos Verstappen	Tyrrell-Ford	G	68	+1 lap	22	
17	20	(Japan) Ukyo Katayama	Minardi-Hart	B	68	+1 lap	19	
Ret	5	(Germany) Michael Schumacher	Ferrari	G	47	Collision	2	
Ret	1	(United Kingdom) Damon Hill	Arrows-Yamaha	B	47	Gearbox	4	
Ret	11	(Germany) Ralf Schumacher	Jordan-Peugeot	G	44	Water leak	16	
Ret	22	(Brazil) Rubens Barrichello	Stewart-Ford	B	30	Gearbox	12	
Ret	2	(Brazil) Pedro Diniz	Arrows-Yamaha	B	11	Spun off	13	

== Post-race ==
=== Schumacher–Villeneuve collision ===
The Dry Sac corner was the scene of Jacques Villeneuve and Michael Schumacher's collision on lap 48.

In the end, Michael moved in on Jacques and tried to knock him off. It was a mistake by Michael, he shouldn't have done it. Interestingly, when he came back into the pits, he had a completely different mental view of what had happened. It wasn't until he saw the TV that he realised what had really happened. He came back to the pits and he was telling us, "we have to get Villeneuve disqualified," and I said "Michael, you really need to look at the TV because it really doesn't look that way I'm afraid." He looked, and he went quiet and realised that things hadn't been quite the way he thought they were from the cockpit.

— Ross Brawn

Before the race at Jerez, Max Mosley, the then president of the FIA, had promised to issue penalties to anyone who tried to influence the outcome of the championship. Before Jerez, Villeneuve and Schumacher almost never battled directly on the track. Race stewards reviewed video footage of the collision between Villeneuve and Schumacher, and determined that it was "a racing incident" and took no further action against Schumacher.

Schumacher was subsequently summoned to a disciplinary hearing by the FIA. On 11 November 1997, it was announced that Schumacher would be disqualified from the 1997 World Championship in an unprecedented move. This meant he lost his second place in the overall standings to Frentzen but he would retain his race victories and other results and would not be fined or face any further punishment in the following season, and Ferrari would remain second in the championship. Schumacher accepted the decision and admitted having made a mistake. Max Mosley stated that the panel "concluded that although the actions were deliberate they were not premeditated". Schumacher was also ordered to take part in a road-safety campaign during the 1998 season.

Ferrari escaped unpunished despite Article 123 of the FIA International Sporting Code stating that "the entrant shall be responsible for all acts or omissions on the part of the driver", meaning that under this rule, which has never been invoked for a driving incident, Ferrari could have been punished for failing to control its driver by being excluded from the championship standings. When questioned on the subject Mosley said that the World Council had decided not to invoke Article 123. Another question which the World Council had not addressed was whether or not there would be any public sanction against the stewards at Jerez who had initially dismissed the Schumacher–Villeneuve collision. It has been argued that this was a dereliction of their duty.

At the time, as former Ferrari technical director Ross Brawn recalled, Schumacher felt that it was Villeneuve's mistake and that he had been wronged but that, upon getting out of the car, having seen the footage as adrenaline had worn off, he realized he had made a mistake. Another view of the collision is that Villeneuve went into the corner too fast. Without Schumacher turning into him, he would have overshot the turn and possibly ended up in the gravel. In later years, Villeneuve himself admitted that he "would never have made that corner without [Schumacher's] push", and Schumacher stated in 2009 that if he could have his career over again, he would "do some things differently", citing Jerez 1997 as something that he would have changed in his career.

=== Media reaction ===
The German newspapers were among the many from across Europe that criticised Schumacher. Bild blamed Schumacher, saying "he played for high stakes and lost everything – the World Championship and his reputation for fair play. There is no doubt that he wanted to take out Villeneuve." The Frankfurter Allgemeine called him "a kamikaze without honour" and alluded to a "monument [that] is starting to crack because the foundations are faulty". A German television channel polled 63,081 fans and found that 28% no longer felt they could support Schumacher.

In Italy, Schumacher was widely condemned. The daily newspaper l'Unità felt that Schumacher deserved to be sacked for bringing shame to Italian sport, and said that "Schumacher ought to face charges in a Spanish court for the grave deed he committed". La Repubblica said that "seeing a world title vanish after waiting 18 years is sad enough. But to see it go up in smoke with the move from Michael Schumacher is unfortunately much worse. It's shameful." Gazzetta dello Sport said they would prefer to wait for Ferrari to win a title in circumstances which would not render it "a title to hide". Despite being owned by the Agnelli family, which also controlled Ferrari, La Stampa said: "His image as a champion was shattered."

In England, Schumacher's manoeuvre against Damon Hill at the 1994 Australian Grand Prix was used as a comparison in many media reports. The Times wrote that Schumacher had "sacrificed his reputation by an act of such cynicism that it lost him the right to any sympathy". The BBC pointed to Schumacher's "history of being involved in controversial collisions", saying the German driver had a "chequered record" and claiming the 1990 Macau Grand Prix and 1991 Nürburgring 430 kilometres as other instances of previous Schumacher controversy. The public broadcaster also posited that the affair "left Formula One's glamorous image in a poor light." The Independent commented that "many observers remain convinced Schumacher and Ferrari, major attractions in the Formula One show, have been given preferential treatment". In 2006, nine years after the incident, The Guardian cited it as an example of Schumacher's "ruthlessness".

In the Australian telecast of the race, former world champion Alan Jones stated that there was "no doubt in [his] mind that Schumacher deliberately drove into the side of him to have him off, à la Damon Hill at Adelaide", while presenter Darrell Eastlake said that it was "not the way the world championship should have been decided and viewers around the world would be disappointed with that sort of act" and his "credibility falls away a bit". Ferrari hosted a press conference on the Tuesday after Jerez during which Schumacher admitted that he had made a mistake but said it was a misjudgment rather than a deliberate attempt to take out Villeneuve. He said: "I am human like everyone else and unfortunately I made a mistake. I don't make many but I did this time."

=== Jerez circuit ===
On 12 December 1997, the World Motorsport Council ruled that Pedro Pacheco, the then mayor of Jerez, disrupted the podium ceremony. Originally, the verdict was that no further Formula One races would occur at the track. When Pacheco appeared before the World Motorsport Council, this ruling was rescinded. As of 2026, this race was the last time that Jerez hosted a Formula One Grand Prix, although it has held many pre-season test days until 2015. The people chosen to present the trophies were dependent on the race order, with Daimler-Benz chairman Jürgen Schrempp only willing to make a presentation to a McLaren-Mercedes driver. As the McLarens of Häkkinen and Coulthard passed Villeneuve's Williams on the last lap, this would have meant he could present either the trophy for first or second position or the winning constructor trophy. There was some confusion due to the late changes in position, and whilst the mayor and the president of the region presented trophies, Schrempp did nothing. FIA president Max Mosley later announced: "The disruption caused embarrassment and inconvenience to those presenting the trophies and therefore, no further rounds of the FIA Formula 1 World Championship will be held at the Jerez circuit."

=== McLaren-Williams and Sauber-Ferrari collusion allegations ===
Murray Walker: A case of champagne from Ferrari to Sauber for Norberto Fontana. Because the Argentinian newcomer, up from Formula 3, really, really, helped Michael Schumacher on his way there.
Martin Brundle: What engines have they got in that Sauber, Murray? Isn't it a Ferrari?
Murray Walker: Well it is, yes. Martin, you are a cynical chap.

— ITV F1 commentary

On 8 November, The Times published an article accusing Williams and McLaren of colluding to decide the finishing order at the end of the Grand Prix. The article's claims were based on recordings of the radio transmissions made by the two teams. The FIA World Council rejected the claims when the matter was brought before them. FIA president Max Mosley stated: "It is quite clear that the result of the race was not fixed. There was no arrangement between McLaren and Williams that Mika Häkkinen was going to win. They were able to demonstrate very clearly that was not the case."

In 2006, Norberto Fontana claimed in an interview with the Argentine newspaper Olé that a few hours before the Grand Prix the Ferrari team director Jean Todt visited the Sauber motorhome and told the Swiss team, which used Ferrari engines at the time, that the Saubers must block Villeneuve if they were in a position to do so in order to help Michael Schumacher win the World Championship. Peter Sauber, the Sauber team owner and manager at the time, denied these allegations and said: "Ferrari never expressed the desire that we should obstruct an opponent of Schumacher on the track."

In 2014, David Coulthard gave an interview to Charles Bradley in Autosport where he stated that an agreement between McLaren and Williams was in place. He said: "Ron [Dennis] had made that deal with Frank [Williams], which none of us knew anything about, that if we helped Williams in their quest to beat Ferrari they wouldn't get in the way of helping McLaren. Ron would probably still deny it today. That's what happened, then they asked me to move over." In March 2021, during an episode of The Race's retrospective podcast Bring Back V10s looking back on this race, Williams team co-founder Patrick Head stated that Frank Williams and Ron Dennis had made a deal to let the McLarens through to win if Villeneuve was in position to win the drivers' championship during the race. Head also stated in the same podcast he did not agree with this decision and was not informed of this plan until mid-race. In the same podcast, Jonathan Williams, the son of Frank, said he became aware of the McLaren/Williams agreement from the ninth lap of the race.

=== Legacy ===
Motorsport website The Race ranked the 1997 European Grand Prix as the greatest Formula One title decider of the V10 era (from 1989 to 2005). It was the second time in four seasons that a final race accident decided the world title.

== Championship standings after the race ==
Drivers' Championship standings
+/–	Pos	Driver	Points
1	1	(Canada) **Jacques Villeneuve**	81
1	2	(Germany) Michael Schumacher	78
	3	(Germany) Heinz-Harald Frentzen	42
1	4	(United Kingdom) David Coulthard	36
1	5	(France) Jean Alesi	36

Constructors' Championship standings
+/–	Pos	Constructor	Points
	1	(United Kingdom) **Williams-Renault**	123
	2	(Italy) Ferrari	102
	3	(Italy) Benetton-Renault	67
	4	(United Kingdom) McLaren-Mercedes	63
	5	(Republic of Ireland) Jordan-Peugeot	33

- Note: Only the top five positions are included for both sets of standings. Drivers' Championship standings accurate as at final declaration of race results. Michael Schumacher was subsequently disqualified from the championship, although his points and results remain on record.
- **Bold text** indicates the 1997 World Champions.

== Notes ==
Previous race: 1997 Japanese Grand Prix	FIA Formula One World Championship; 1997 season	Next race: 1998 Australian Grand Prix
Previous race: 1996 European Grand Prix; Previous race at Jerez: 1994 European Grand Prix	European Grand Prix	Next race: 1999 European Grand Prix
