= 2021 Portuguese Grand Prix =

Third round of the 2021 Formula One season

Race 3 of 22 (Note: At the time of the event Formula One planned to hold twenty-three Grands Prix.) in the 2021 Formula One World Championship
← Previous race	Next race →
- Layout of the Algarve International Circuit

Race details
- Date: 2 May 2021
- Official name: Formula 1 Heineken Grande Prémio de Portugal 2021
- Location: Algarve International Circuit; Portimão, Algarve, Portugal
- Course: Permanent racing facility
- Course length: 4.653 km (2.891 miles)
- Distance: 66 laps, 306.826 km (190.653 miles)
- Weather: Light cloud
- Attendance: 0 (Note: The Grand Prix was held behind closed doors due to the COVID-19 pandemic in Portugal.)

Pole position
Driver	(Finland) Valtteri Bottas	Mercedes
- Time: 1:18.348

Fastest lap
Driver	(Finland) Valtteri Bottas	Mercedes
- Time: 1:19.865 on lap 65

Podium
First	(United Kingdom) Lewis Hamilton	Mercedes
Second	(Netherlands) Max Verstappen	Red Bull Racing-Honda
Third	(Finland) Valtteri Bottas	Mercedes

The 2021 Portuguese Grand Prix (officially known as the Formula 1 Heineken Grande Prémio de Portugal 2021) was a Formula One motor race that took place on 2 May 2021 at the Algarve International Circuit in Portimão, Portugal. The 66-lap race was won by Mercedes driver Lewis Hamilton from second. Max Verstappen took second place for Red Bull Racing, with Mercedes's Valtteri Bottas finishing third after starting on pole and rounding out the podium places. This was also the last Portuguese Grand Prix until 2027, as the race was not contracted from 2022 to 2026.

== Background ==
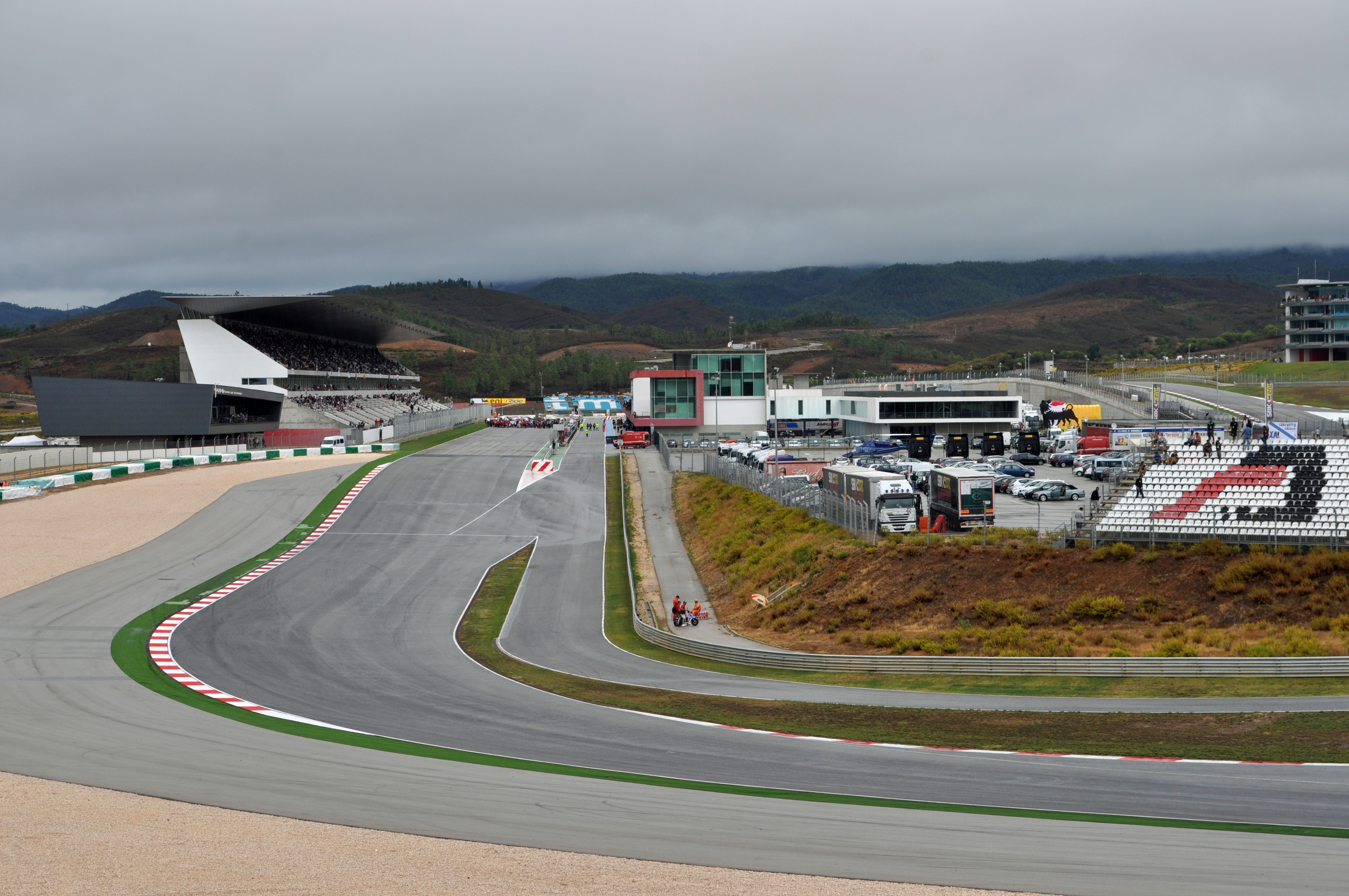
The pit straight at Portimão in 2012.

The drivers and teams were the same as the season entry list with no additional stand-in drivers for the race. Callum Ilott drove in the first practice session for Alfa Romeo Racing in place of Antonio Giovinazzi, making his Formula One practice debut.

Tyre supplier Pirelli brought the C1, C2 and C3 tyre compounds (designated hard, medium and soft respectively) for teams to use at the event.

Ahead of the Grand Prix organisers announced that a second DRS zone would be available for drivers to aid overtaking. The new DRS zone is established between turns 4 and 5, with the detection point located before turn 4. Unlike the previous edition of the race, the DRS zone located on the main straight was reduced of 120 metres, and the detection point was moved to from turn 14 to after the start of turn 15.

== Practice ==
There were three practice sessions, each an hour in length. The first practice session started at 11:30 local time (UTC+01:00) on 30 April. The second practice session started at 15:00 local time on that afternoon and the final practice session started at 12:00 local time on the following day.

The first practice session ended with Valtteri Bottas fastest for Mercedes ahead of the Red Bulls of Max Verstappen and Sergio Pérez. Lewis Hamilton, who had struggled finding a level of comfort in his car during FP1, was fastest in the second practice session for Mercedes, with Verstappen in second and Bottas rounding out the top three.

== Qualifying ==
Qualifying started at 15:00 local time (UTC+01:00) on 1 May. Valtteri Bottas set provisional pole in his first Q3 run, while Verstappen's first flying lap was invalidated for exceeding track limits. Ultimately, neither Bottas, Hamilton nor Verstappen were able to improve on their second flying laps, and Bottas kept pole.

=== Qualifying classification ===
Pos.	No.	Driver	Constructor	Qualifying times			Final grid
Pos.	No.	Driver	Constructor	Q1	Q2	Q3	Final grid
1	77	(Finland) Valtteri Bottas	Mercedes	1:18.722	1:18.458	1:18.348	1
2	44	(United Kingdom) Lewis Hamilton	Mercedes	1:18.857	1:17.968	1:18.355	2
3	33	(Netherlands) Max Verstappen	Red Bull Racing-Honda	1:19.485	1:18.650	1:18.746	3
4	11	(Mexico) Sergio Pérez	Red Bull Racing-Honda	1:19.337	1:18.845	1:18.890	4
5	55	(Spain) Carlos Sainz Jr.	Ferrari	1:19.309	1:18.813	1:19.039	5
6	31	(France) Esteban Ocon	Alpine-Renault	1:19.092	1:18.586	1:19.042	6
7	4	(United Kingdom) Lando Norris	McLaren-Mercedes	1:18.794	1:18.481	1:19.116	7
8	16	(Monaco) Charles Leclerc	Ferrari	1:19.373	1:18.769	1:19.306	8
9	10	(France) Pierre Gasly	AlphaTauri-Honda	1:19.464	1:19.052	1:19.475	9
10	5	(Germany) Sebastian Vettel	Aston Martin-Mercedes	1:19.403	1:18.970	1:19.659	10
11	63	(United Kingdom) George Russell	Williams-Mercedes	1:19.797	1:19.109	N/A	11
12	99	(Italy) Antonio Giovinazzi	Alfa Romeo Racing-Ferrari	1:19.410	1:19.216	N/A	12
13	14	(Spain) Fernando Alonso	Alpine-Renault	1:19.728	1:19.456	N/A	13
14	22	(Japan) Yuki Tsunoda	AlphaTauri-Honda	1:19.684	1:19.463	N/A	14
15	7	(Finland) Kimi Räikkönen	Alfa Romeo Racing-Ferrari	1:19.748	1:19.812	N/A	15
16	3	(Australia) Daniel Ricciardo	McLaren-Mercedes	1:19.839	N/A	N/A	16
17	18	(Canada) Lance Stroll	Aston Martin-Mercedes	1:19.913	N/A	N/A	17
18	6	(Canada) Nicholas Latifi	Williams-Mercedes	1:20.285	N/A	N/A	18
19	47	(Germany) Mick Schumacher	Haas-Ferrari	1:20.452	N/A	N/A	19
20	9	(Russian Automobile Federation) Nikita Mazepin (Note: Nikita Mazepin is Russian, but he competed as a neutral competitor using the designation RAF (Russian Automobile Federation), as the Court of Arbitration for Sport upheld a ban on Russia competing at World Championships. The ban was implemented by the World Anti-Doping Agency in response to the state-sponsored doping program of Russian athletes.)	Haas-Ferrari	1:20.912	N/A	N/A	20
107% time: 1:24.232

== Race ==
The race started at 15:00 local time on Sunday 2 May. Valtteri Bottas held the lead into turn 1 ahead of Max Verstappen, Lewis Hamilton, Carlos Sainz Jr. and Sergio Pérez. Kimi Räikkönen made contact with teammate Antonio Giovinazzi on the main straight at the end of lap 1 bringing out the safety car. Räikkönen's race was over but Giovinazzi managed to continue without damage.

=== Race classification ===
Pos.	No.	Driver	Constructor	Laps	Time/Retired	Grid	Points
1	44	(United Kingdom) Lewis Hamilton	Mercedes	66	1:34:31.421	2	25
2	33	(Netherlands) Max Verstappen	Red Bull Racing-Honda	66	+29.148	3	18
3	77	(Finland) Valtteri Bottas	Mercedes	66	+33.530	1	16^{1}
4	11	(Mexico) Sergio Pérez	Red Bull Racing-Honda	66	+39.735	4	12
5	4	(United Kingdom) Lando Norris	McLaren-Mercedes	66	+51.369	7	10
6	16	(Monaco) Charles Leclerc	Ferrari	66	+55.781	8	8
7	31	(France) Esteban Ocon	Alpine-Renault	66	+1:03.749	6	6
8	14	(Spain) Fernando Alonso	Alpine-Renault	66	+1:04.808	13	4
9	3	(Australia) Daniel Ricciardo	McLaren-Mercedes	66	+1:15.369	16	2
10	10	(France) Pierre Gasly	AlphaTauri-Honda	66	+1:16.463	9	1
11	55	(Spain) Carlos Sainz Jr.	Ferrari	66	+1:18.955	5	
12	99	(Italy) Antonio Giovinazzi	Alfa Romeo Racing-Ferrari	65	+1 lap	12	
13	5	(Germany) Sebastian Vettel	Aston Martin-Mercedes	65	+1 lap	10	
14	18	(Canada) Lance Stroll	Aston Martin-Mercedes	65	+1 lap	17	
15	22	(Japan) Yuki Tsunoda	AlphaTauri-Honda	65	+1 lap	14	
16	63	(United Kingdom) George Russell	Williams-Mercedes	65	+1 lap	11	
17	47	(Germany) Mick Schumacher	Haas-Ferrari	64	+2 laps	19	
18	6	(Canada) Nicholas Latifi	Williams-Mercedes	64	+2 laps	18	
19	9	(Russian Automobile Federation) Nikita Mazepin	Haas-Ferrari	64	+2 laps^{2}	20	
Ret	7	(Finland) Kimi Räikkönen	Alfa Romeo Racing-Ferrari	1	Collision	15	
Fastest lap: (Finland) Valtteri Bottas (Mercedes) – 1:19.865 (lap 65)

Notes

- ^1 – Includes one point for fastest lap. Max Verstappen's fastest lap of 1:19.849 on lap 66 was deleted by the stewards for exceeding track limits.
- ^2 – Nikita Mazepin received a five-second time penalty for ignoring blue flags. The penalty made no difference as he was classified in the last position.

== Championship standings after the race ==
Drivers' Championship standings

	Pos.	Driver	Points
	1	(United Kingdom) Lewis Hamilton	69
	2	(Netherlands) Max Verstappen	61
	3	(United Kingdom) Lando Norris	37
1	4	(Finland) Valtteri Bottas	32
1	5	(Monaco) Charles Leclerc	28

Constructors' Championship standings

	Pos.	Constructor	Points
	1	(Germany) Mercedes	101
	2	(Austria) Red Bull Racing-Honda	83
	3	(United Kingdom) McLaren-Mercedes	53
	4	(Italy) Ferrari	42
2	5	(France) Alpine-Renault	13

- Note: Only the top five positions are included for both sets of standings.

== Notes ==
Previous race: 2021 Emilia Romagna Grand Prix	FIA Formula One World Championship; 2021 season	Next race: 2021 Spanish Grand Prix
Previous race: 2020 Portuguese Grand Prix	Portuguese Grand Prix	Next race: 2027 Portuguese Grand Prix
