= Portuguese Grand Prix =

Formula One and Sportscar race held in Portugal

- Algarve International Circuit

Race information
- Number of times held: 27
- First held: 1951
- Most wins (drivers): (France) Alain Prost (3) (United Kingdom) Nigel Mansell (3)
- Most wins (constructors): (Italy) Ferrari (7)
- Circuit length: 4.653 km (2.891 miles)
- Race length: 306.826 km (190.653 miles)
- Laps: 66

Last race (2021)

Pole position
- (Finland) Valtteri Bottas; Mercedes; 1:18.348

Podium
- 1. (United Kingdom) Lewis Hamilton; Mercedes; 1:34:31.421; 2. (Netherlands) Max Verstappen; Red Bull Racing-Honda; +29.148; 3. (Finland) Valtteri Bottas; Mercedes; +33.530

Fastest lap
- (Finland) Valtteri Bottas; Mercedes; 1:19.865

The Portuguese Grand Prix (Portuguese: Grande Prémio de Portugal) is a motorsports event that was first held in 1951 as a sportscar race. It was later held intermittently, including as a sportscar race in 1964 and as a Formula Three event in 1965 and 1966. The race formed part of the Formula One World Championship from 1958 to 1960 and again from 1984 to 1996. It returned to the Formula One calendar in 2020 and 2021 amid calendar changes caused by the COVID-19 pandemic, and is scheduled to return to the calendar in 2027 and 2028. The event has been held at several circuits throughout its history; its most recent Formula One editions were held at the Algarve International Circuit.

== History ==
=== Boavista and Monsanto (1951–1960) ===
The Boavista circuit, alternating with Monsanto from 1951 to 1960

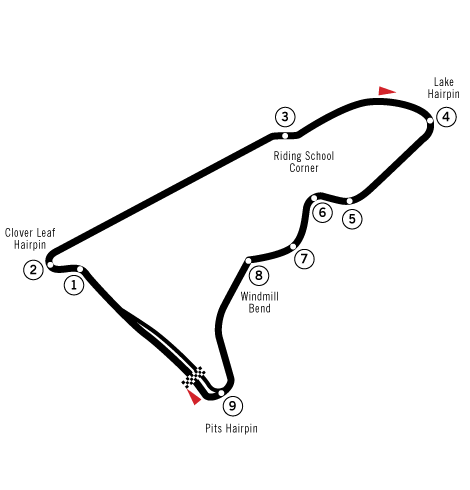
The Monsanto circuit, alternating with Boavista from 1954 to 1959

The first event was held on the Boavista street course in Porto on 17 June 1951 as a sports car race. The Grand Prix was moved to Monsanto Park, Lisbon, in 1954 as a one-off. Monsanto, like the Boavista circuit, was a hazardous street circuit lined with trees and had many elevation change and fast sweepers; but Monsanto was quite wide as opposed to Boavista, which was narrow. Sportscar events continued until 1957 when the following year it became part of the Formula One world championship. The first Formula One race was held on 14 August 1958 in Boavista. This circuit was situated in a hazardous area; it was laid out through the town and included sections of cobbled streets and even tramlines. British drivers Stirling Moss in a Vanwall and Mike Hawthorn in a Ferrari were at the top of the championship table, battling it out for the first eight rain-interrupted laps. Moss then pulled away as Hawthorn slipped behind Frenchman Jean Behra in a BRM until the British car hit spark plug problems. But the drama was only just beginning as a protest was made against Hawthorn who, it was claimed when he had restarted his car had driven a few yards in the wrong direction, which was against the rules and meant that Hawthorn was to be disqualified. As soon as he heard it, Moss headed to the stewards and told them Hawthorn had been off the course when he was spotted and that was not against the rules. Moss's evidence swung the decision, and no action was taken. Had the protest been upheld, Hawthorn would have lost seven points – six for finishing second and an extra one for recording the fastest lap. In the event, Moss's intervention allowed Hawthorn to win the Drivers' Championship title by one point – from Moss. This race was followed in 1959 by a Grand Prix at Monsanto, which was won again by Moss, this time in a mid-engined Cooper. Australian Jack Brabham hit a telegraph pole after swerving to hit the twice lapped local driver Mario Cabral; Brabham was thrown out of the car and landed on the track; he was then narrowly missed by American Masten Gregory. After this race, Monsanto Park was abandoned, and F1 returned to Boavista in 1960. This race was won by Brabham in a Cooper. The Portuguese Grand Prix was then discontinued and did not return until 1984.

The name was resurrected for a sports car sprint event in the Cascais street circuit in 1964. The following two years, it was run for Formula Three cars.

=== Estoril (1984–1996) ===
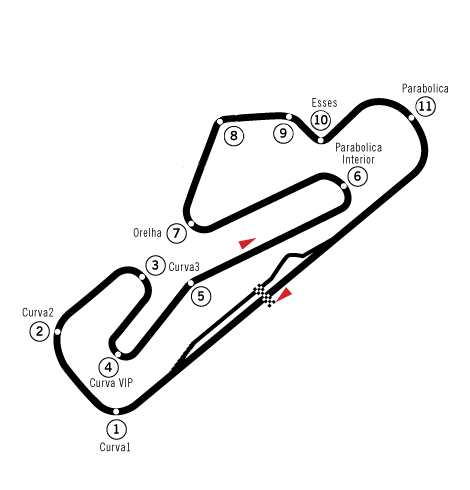
The original Estoril circuit, used from 1984 to 1993

The seeds for the return of the Portuguese Grand Prix were planted with the inauguration of the Autódromo do Estoril near the capital of Lisbon in 1972. The Estoril Grand Prix was held as a European Formula Two Championship event during the 1970s. This circuit was to see some of the most memorable and exciting races in Formula One's history. On 21 October 1984, Portugal returned to the F1 calendar, ending the season, where Frenchman Alain Prost won the race but failed to win the Championship by half a point from his teammate, Austrian Niki Lauda who finished 2nd in the race. In 1985, the Grand Prix was moved to 21 April and held under heavy rain, the ideal conditions for Ayrton Senna to win his first race. From 1986, the race was held in what would become its traditional date, in the penultimate week of September; this race was won by Briton Nigel Mansell. 1987 saw Prost win his 28th Grand Prix, breaking Jackie Stewart's 14-year-old record; and 1988 was to see controversy between Prost and his McLaren teammate Senna. Coming out of the long Parabolica corner, Prost lined up to pass Senna but in an attempt to stop him, the Brazilian squeezed the Frenchman and he nearly hit the wall separating the pit lane from the track; but Prost kept his foot flat and passed Senna going into the first corner. Prost, a mild-mannered driver, was angry with Senna. This one incident between the world's two best Formula One drivers at the time led to one of the most famous sporting rivalries in history. 1989 saw yet more controversy; Mansell, now driving a Ferrari, overshot his pit lane entrance; and, against his team's gesticulations, went into reverse gear and backed into his pit stop position, which was against the rules. Sometime after Mansell went out, he was given the black disqualification flag. He did not go in, however, and as he came up to pass Senna who was leading while passing the pits and being shown the black flag again, Mansell ducked out, Senna turned into the Ferrari and both drivers went off the track and into the run-off area. This incident just about destroyed Senna's 1989 championship chances. Because he had failed to score any points at this event, he now had to win all 3 races to stand any chance of beating his teammate and rival Prost, who finished 2nd to Mansell's teammate, Austrian Gerhard Berger. Mansell and Ferrari were both fined $50,000 and the Englishman was banned for the next race, the Spanish Grand Prix.

1990 saw an incredibly exciting race, as Senna, Prost, Mansell and Berger all battled hard to gain top honors; Mansell made a very poor start and nearly took out his Ferrari teammate Prost, which allowed Senna and Berger to slip by and take 1st and 2nd. Mansell and Prost fought back; it also saw backmarker Philippe Alliot nearly take out the leader Mansell and crash heavily at the second corner; Alex Caffi and Aguri Suzuki crashed their cars on lap 59; the marshals could not get the cars off the track and the race was called short. Mansell won from Senna and Prost; Berger finished 4th. 1991 saw yet more drama: Mansell (now driving for Williams) then saw his own championship chances start to fade when he came into the pits to change his tires; however the rear right wheel was not fastened down properly and when Mansell went out, he only went about 50 feet before the right rear wheel came off. He was stuck in the middle of the pit road, unable to move. Mansell then reversed the Williams, and the Williams mechanics ran to the stricken car and lifted it bodily while in the pit road and fitted the rear tire properly; which took about a minute. These actions broke all sorts of rules, and Mansell, after coming out in 17th place, was shown the black flag. He had come up to 6th by the time he was disqualified; the race was won by the Englishman's Italian teammate Riccardo Patrese. 1992 saw Mansell win and Patrese have a horrific crash after he hit the back of Gerhard Berger's McLaren and was launched into the air while next to the pit lane. The car came down and scraped alongside the pit wall; no one was injured. 1993 saw Alain Prost win his fourth and final Drivers' Championship driving for Williams; he finished 2nd in the race to German Michael Schumacher in a Benetton.

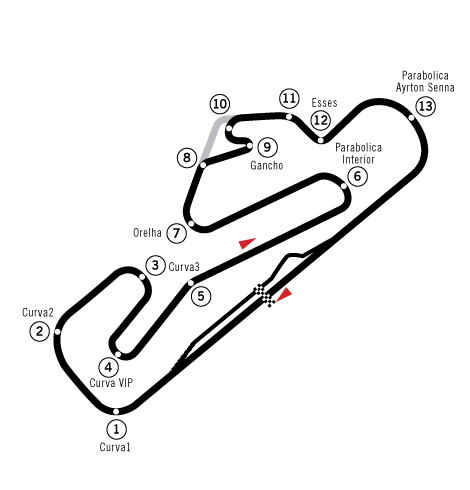
The Estoril circuit after modifications, used from 1994 to 1996

1994 saw a change to the circuit in response to the deaths of Senna and Roland Ratzenberger at Imola. The Esses corner before the Parabolica was made into a 3 corner sequence; the race was won by Williams driver Damon Hill, and 1995 saw a huge accident at the start involving Ukyo Katayama in a Tyrrell; the race was won by David Coulthard. 1996 saw Canadian rookie Jacques Villeneuve in a Williams pass Schumacher on the outside of the Parabolica, and the Canadian won the race. The track tended to promote close racing and the weather was usually good although as Estoril is only a few miles from the westernmost point of Europe, it tended to be affected by stiff breezes and rain storms coming off the Atlantic Ocean. A bigger problem, however, was the local attitude towards the circuit. The FIA asked time and again for the track's facilities to be improved, but nothing was done.

==== Cancellation of planned 1997 and 1998 races ====
In 1997 the governing body called Estoril's rework proposal a bluff; promised renovation work was not done and so the race was cancelled. Estoril was planned to be the final race of the 1997 season, but it was replaced with the European Grand Prix, which was held at Jerez in Spain. Portugal's Economy Minister Augusto Mateus immediately announced that the government was going to provide the $6 million necessary for the work, so the race was not going to be cancelled, but it never happened. In an effort to speed up the work, the Portuguese government bought a controlling interest in the company that owned the track. The Portuguese GP was listed on the 1998 calendar but was cancelled when the upgrading work could not be completed in time.

=== Portimão (2020–2021, 2027–2028) ===
On 4 April 2009, Max Mosley stated that based on the quality of the Algarve International Circuit in Portimão, the Portuguese Grand Prix could be integrated into the Formula One championship, as long as a commercial agreement with the Formula One Management is achieved.

The race returned for the 2020 season in Portimão, to help the sport fill its calendar in light of other races being cancelled due to the COVID-19 pandemic. The race was held on 25 October 2020 and was the first Grand Prix for this venue. The race saw Lewis Hamilton score his 92nd Grand Prix win breaking Michael Schumacher's previous record for most Formula One Grand Prix wins. The circuit hosted an additional race in 2021. Formula One is due to return to Portimão in 2027 and 2028.

== Winners ==
=== By year ===
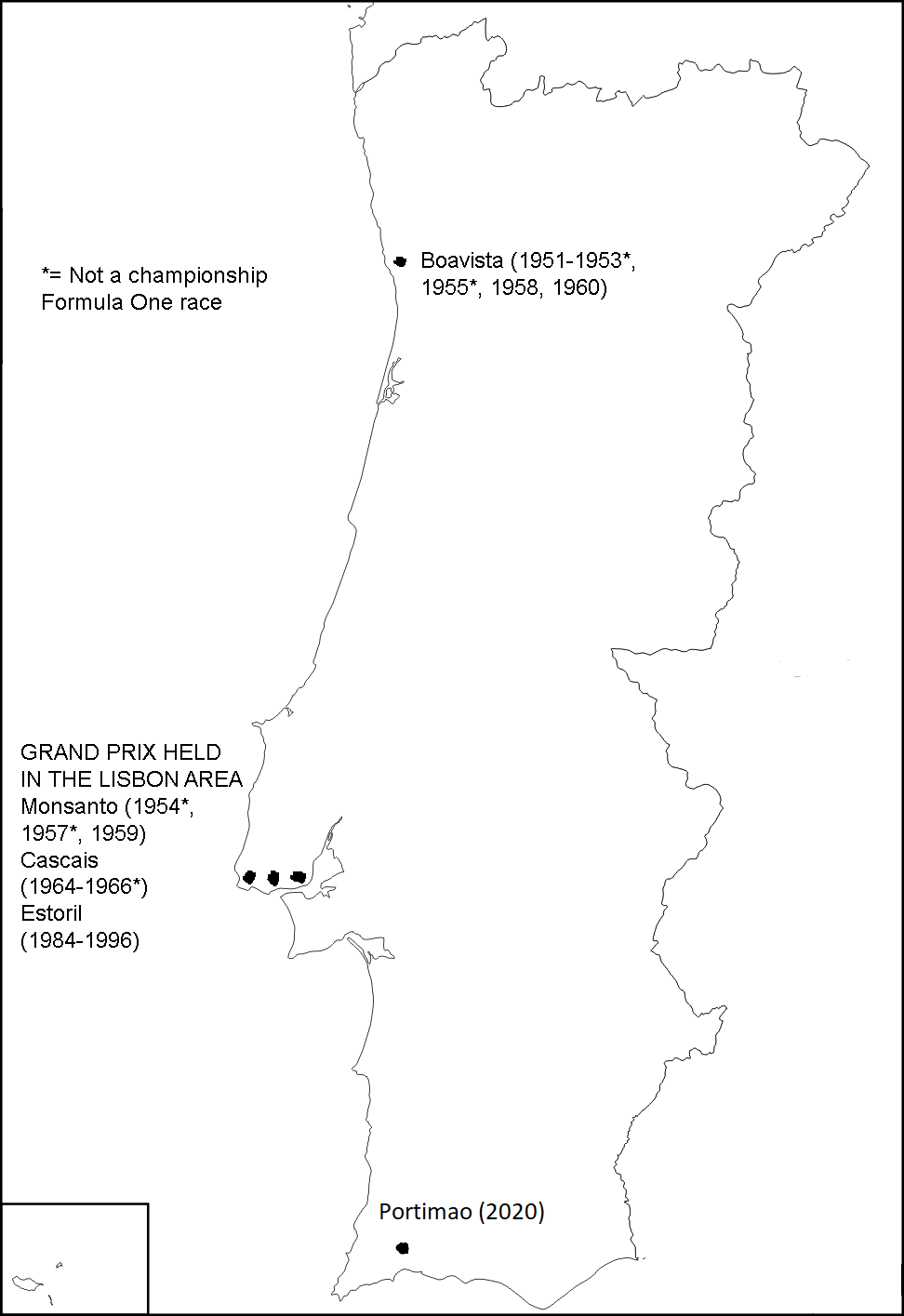
A map of all the locations of the Portuguese Grand Prix

A pink background indicates an event that was not part of the Formula One World Championship. A sports car sprint event in the Cascais street circuit in 1964. The following two years, it was run for Formula Three cars.

Year	Driver	Constructor	Category	Location	Report
1951	(Portugal) Casimiro de Oliveira	Ferrari	Sportscar	Boavista	Report
1952	(Italy) Eugenio Castellotti	Ferrari	Sportscar	Boavista	Report
1953	(Portugal) José Arroyo Nogueira Pinto	Ferrari	Sportscar	Boavista	Report
1954	(Argentina) José Froilán González	Ferrari	Sportscar	Monsanto	Report
1955	(France) Jean Behra	Maserati	Sportscar	Boavista	Report
1956	Not held				
1957	(Argentina) Juan Manuel Fangio	Maserati	Sportscar	Monsanto	Report
1958	(United Kingdom) Stirling Moss	Vanwall	F1	Boavista	Report
1959	(United Kingdom) Stirling Moss	Cooper-Climax	F1	Monsanto	Report
1960	(Australia) Jack Brabham	Cooper-Climax	F1	Boavista	Report
1961 – 1963	Not held				
1964	(United Kingdom) Chris Kerrison	Ferrari	Sportscar	Cascais	Report
1965	(United Kingdom) Rodney Banting	Cooper-Ford	F3	Cascais	Report
1966	(Switzerland) Jürg Dubler	Brabham-Ford	F3	Cascais	Report
1967 – 1983	Not held				
1984	**(France)** Alain Prost	McLaren-TAG	F1	Estoril	Report
1985	(Brazil) Ayrton Senna	Lotus-Renault	F1	Estoril	Report
1986	(United Kingdom) Nigel Mansell	Williams-Honda	F1	Estoril	Report
1987	**(France)** Alain Prost	McLaren-TAG	F1	Estoril	Report
1988	**(France)** Alain Prost	McLaren-Honda	F1	Estoril	Report
1989	(Austria) Gerhard Berger	Ferrari	F1	Estoril	Report
1990	(United Kingdom) Nigel Mansell	Ferrari	F1	Estoril	Report
1991	(Italy) Riccardo Patrese	Williams-Renault	F1	Estoril	Report
1992	(United Kingdom) Nigel Mansell	Williams-Renault	F1	Estoril	Report
1993	(Germany) Michael Schumacher	Benetton-Ford	F1	Estoril	Report
1994	(United Kingdom) Damon Hill	Williams-Renault	F1	Estoril	Report
1995	(United Kingdom) David Coulthard	Williams-Renault	F1	Estoril	Report
1996	(Canada) Jacques Villeneuve	Williams-Renault	F1	Estoril	Report
1997 – 2019	Not held – Planned 1997 round cancelled and replaced by the European Grand Prix at Jerez. The proposed 1998 event was also cancelled but was not replaced.				
2020	(United Kingdom) Lewis Hamilton	Mercedes	F1	Portimão	Report
2021	(United Kingdom) Lewis Hamilton	Mercedes	F1	Portimão	Report

=== Repeat winners (drivers) ===
Drivers in bold are competing in the Formula One championship in 2026.

Wins	Driver	Years won
3	**(France)** Alain Prost	1984, 1987, 1988
3	(United Kingdom) Nigel Mansell	1986, 1990, 1992
2	(United Kingdom) Stirling Moss	1958, 1959
2	**(United Kingdom) Lewis Hamilton**	2020, 2021

=== Repeat winners (constructors) ===
A pink background indicates an event which was not part of the Formula One World Championship.

Teams in bold are competing in the Formula One championship in 2026.

Wins	Constructor	Years won
7	(Italy) **Ferrari**	1951, 1952, 1953, 1954, 1964, 1989, 1990
6	(United Kingdom) **Williams**	1986, 1991, 1992, 1994, 1995, 1996
3	(United Kingdom) Cooper	1959, 1960, 1965
3	(United Kingdom) **McLaren**	1984, 1987, 1988
2	(Italy) Maserati	1955, 1957
2	(Germany) **Mercedes**	2020, 2021

=== Repeat winners (engine manufacturers) ===
A pink background indicates an event which was not part of the Formula One World Championship.

Manufacturers in bold are competing in the Formula One championship in 2026.

Wins	Manufacturer	Years won
7	(Italy) **Ferrari**	1951, 1952, 1953, 1954, 1964, 1989, 1990
6	**(France)** Renault	1985, 1991, 1992, 1994, 1995, 1996
3	(United States) Ford *	1965, 1966, 1993
2	(Italy) Maserati	1955, 1957
2	(United Kingdom) Climax	1959, 1960
2	(Luxembourg) TAG **	1984, 1987
2	**(Japan) Honda**	1986, 1988
2	(Germany) **Mercedes**	2020, 2021

* Built by Cosworth

** Built by Porsche
