= Circuito de Monsanto =

Race track near Lisbon, Portugal

Circuito de Monsanto (Monsanto Park Circuit)
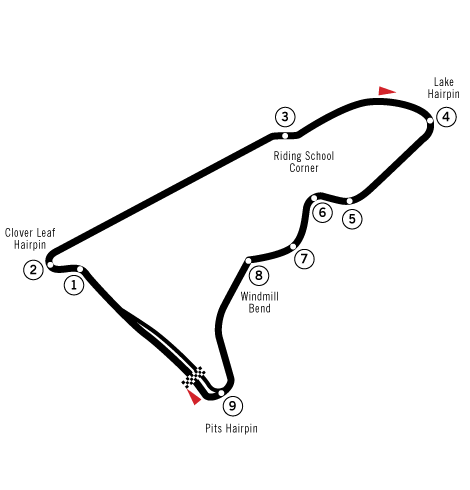
- Grand Prix Circuit (1953–1959)
- Location: Lisbon, Portugal
- Coordinates: 38°43′11″N 9°12′11″W
- Opened: 1953
- Closed: 1971
- Major events: Formula One; Portuguese Grand Prix (1959)

Grand Prix Circuit (1953–1959)
- Length: 5.440 km (3.380 miles)
- Race lap record: 2:05.07 ( (United Kingdom) Stirling Moss, Cooper T51, 1959, F1)

The Circuito de Monsanto, or Monsanto Park Circuit, was a 5.440 km (3.380 mi) race track in Monsanto Forest Park, near Lisbon, Portugal which hosted the Portuguese Grand Prix.

Built on parklands, the circuit was considered difficult to drive because it crossed so many different types of surfaces, including tramlines at one point. The track hosted numerous races from 1954 to 1959, but only one race qualified as a Formula One event: the 1959 Portuguese Grand Prix, won by Stirling Moss. He won the race in the twilight hours, since the race was purposely started late in the day to avoid the intense late summer sun.

== See also ==
- Monsanto Forest Park
- 1959 Portuguese Grand Prix
