= Haas VF-16 =

Formula One car

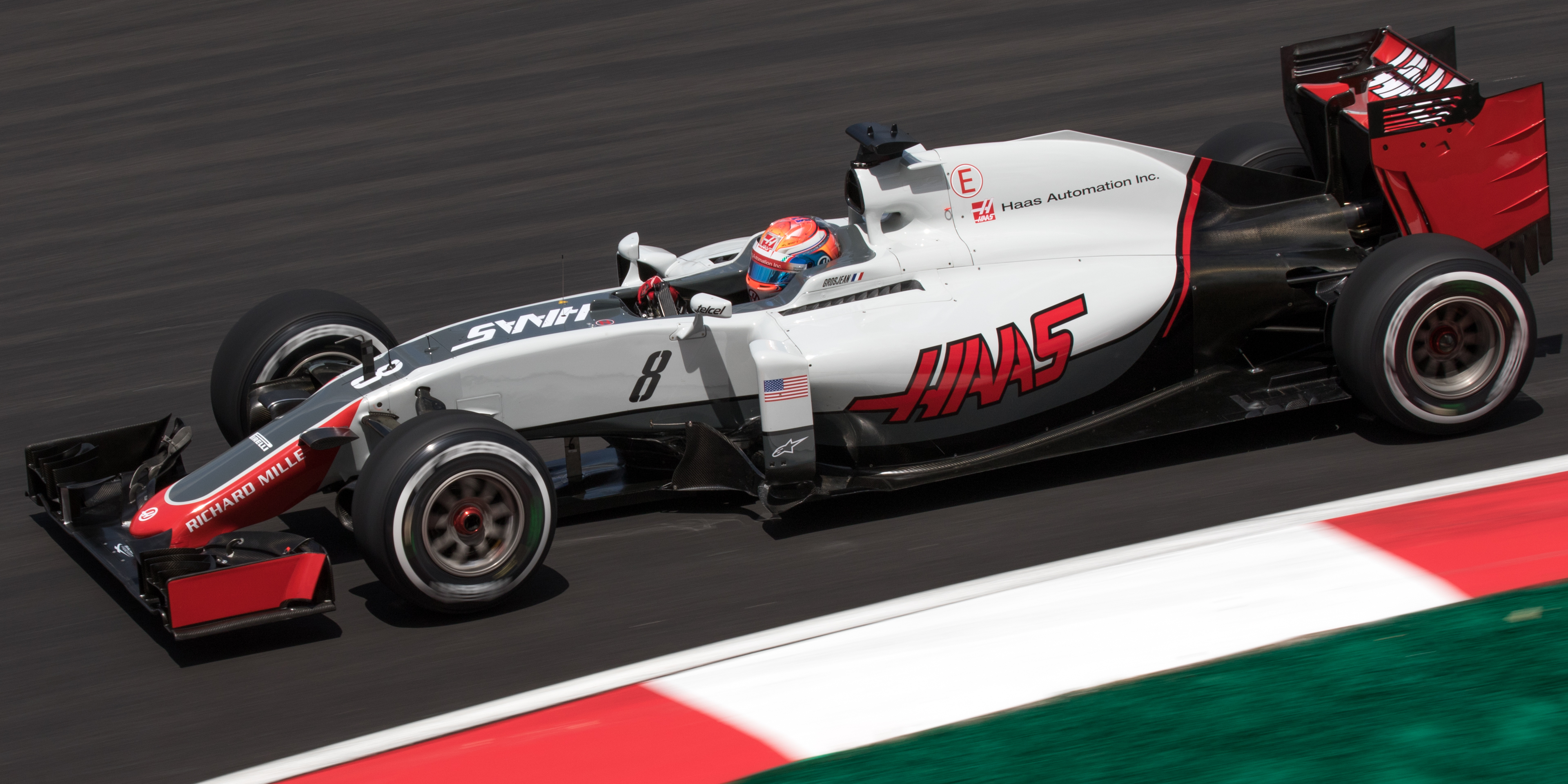
- The Haas VF-16, driven by Romain Grosjean, during the Malaysian Grand Prix
- Category: Formula One
- Constructor: Haas
- Designers: Rob Taylor (Chief Designer); Ben Agathangelou (Chief Aerodynamicist)
- Successor: Haas VF-17

Technical specifications
- Chassis: Carbon-fibre monocoque with honeycomb structure
- Suspension (front): Carbon fibre wishbone with pushrod-activated torsion springs and rockers
- Suspension (rear): same as front
- Length: 5,200 mm (205 in)
- Width: 1,800 mm (71 in)
- Height: 950 mm (37 in)
- Wheelbase: 3,500 mm (138 in)
- Engine: Ferrari 061 1.6 L (98 cu in) direct injection V6 turbocharged engine, limited to 15,000 RPM in a mid-mounted, rear-wheel drive layout
- Electric motor: Kinetic and thermal energy recovery systems
- Transmission: Ferrari eight-speed sequential semi-automatic paddle-operated gearbox
- Battery: Ferrari lithium-ion batteries
- Weight: 702 kg (1,548 lb)
- Fuel: Shell V-Power
- Lubricants: Pennzoil Ultra Platinum
- Brakes: Brembo
- Tyres: Pirelli P Zero (dry), Pirelli Cinturato (wet)

Competition history
- Notable entrants: Haas F1 Team
- Notable drivers: 8. (France) Romain Grosjean; 21. (Mexico) Esteban Gutiérrez
- Debut: 2016 Australian Grand Prix
- Last event: 2016 Abu Dhabi Grand Prix
| Races | Wins | Podiums | Poles | F/Laps |
|---|---|---|---|---|
| 21 | 0 | 0 | 0 | 0 |

The Haas VF-16 is a Formula One car designed and built by Italian chassis manufacturer Dallara on behalf of Haas F1 Team for use in the 2016 Formula One season. The car was built by Dallara, marking their return 24 years after previously supplying Scuderia Italia until 1992 and powered by Ferrari's 2016-specification power unit, the Ferrari 061. It was driven by former Lotus driver Romain Grosjean and Esteban Gutiérrez, who had made his return to competition after spending the 2015 season as a testing and development driver for Ferrari. The car made its competitive debut at the 2016 Australian Grand Prix.

== Development history ==
=== Naming ===
The origin of naming the car "VF-16" is derived from the first CNC machine manufactured by Haas Automation, the VF-1, launched in 1988. The "V" stands for vertical, which is an industry standard designation for a vertical mill. Gene Haas, founder of Haas Automation, added "F1" to the name to unofficially designate it as the company's "Very First One".

=== Design ===
Italian chassis manufacturer Dallara was contracted to design the VF-16 in December 2014, shortly after Haas' entry was accepted to the grid. Team founder Gene Haas chose to structure the team as a client of Scuderia Ferrari, and as a result, the VF-16 shares several elements—including the gearbox and suspension—with Ferrari's 2016 entry, the SF16-H.

=== Testing ===
The VF-16 was unveiled at the Circuit de Barcelona-Catalunya ahead of the first pre-season test. Its early testing phase was overshadowed by a front wing failure, fuel feed problems and complications surrounding a turbo failure.

== Season summary ==
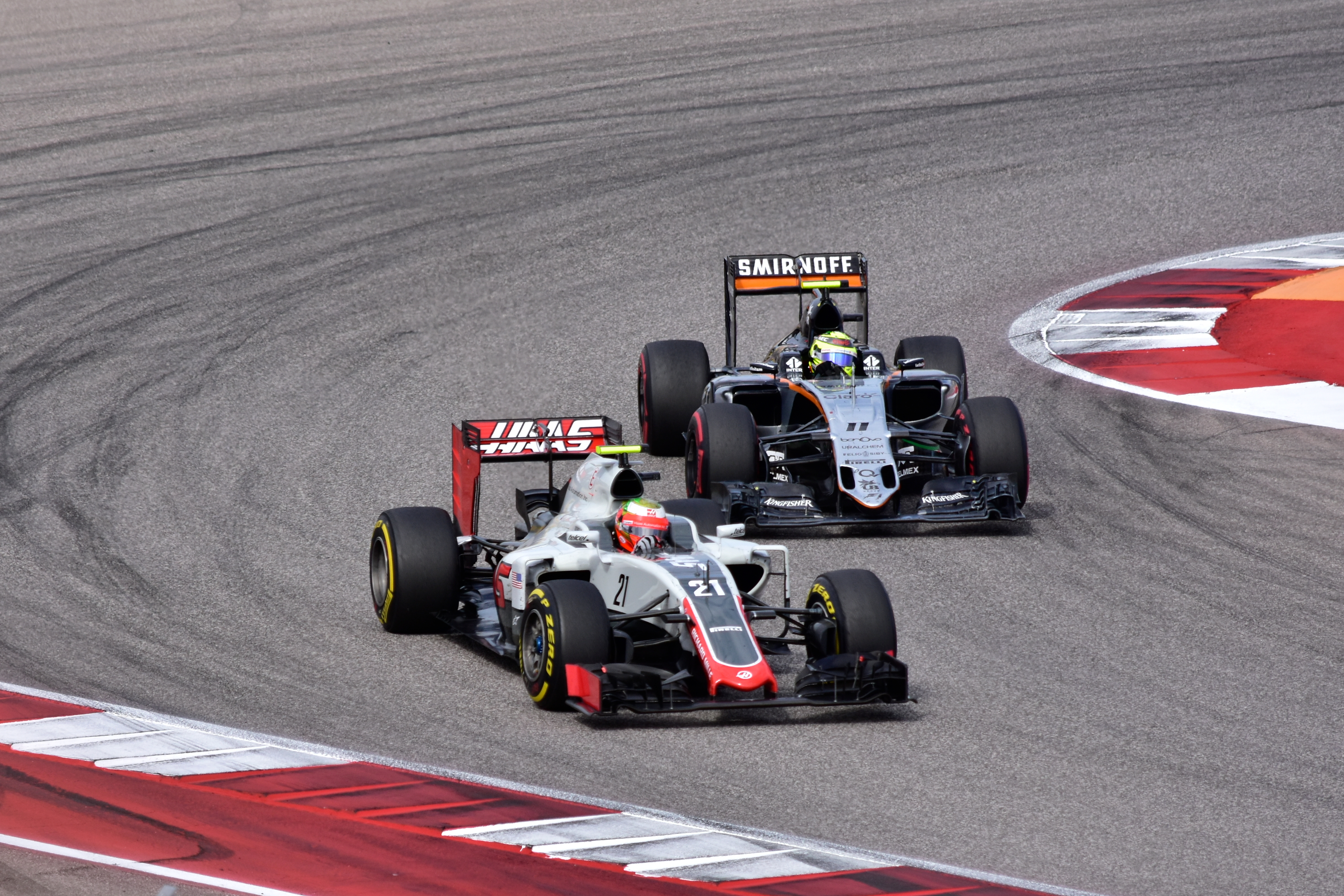
Gutiérrez battling against compatriot Sergio Pérez at the United States Grand Prix

The VF-16 made its competitive debut at the Australian Grand Prix, where it made an inauspicious start to its season when Romain Grosjean collided with Rio Haryanto in pit lane during practice. Both Grosjean and Esteban Gutiérrez were eliminated early in qualifying, with both VF-16s occupying the penultimate row of the grid. During the race, Grosjean ran as high as tenth when Gutiérrez collided with Fernando Alonso, causing Alonso's McLaren to roll over and prompting the race to be temporarily stopped while the scene of the accident was cleaned up. The team took advantage of the race stoppage to switch Grosjean's strategy, putting him on the most durable tyre compound available and running him to the end of the race on one set of tyres. Grosjean finished sixth, scoring eight World Championship points and making Haas the first start-up team to score points on their debut since Toyota in 2002. (Note: Although both Red Bull Racing and Brawn GP scored points on their début in 2005 and 2009, both teams had previously competed under different names before being bought by Red Bull and Brawn.)

At the next round in Bahrain, Grosjean qualified in ninth place and went on to beat his Melbourne result by finishing fifth. Gutiérrez qualified in thirteenth place, but once again retired from the race, this time with brake problems.

Grosjean also scored points at the Russian, Austrian and United States Grands Prix, while Gutiérrez could only manage a best finish of eleventh at a handful of races. He was not retained by the team for 2017, being replaced by Kevin Magnussen.

== Complete Formula One results ==
(key) (results in bold indicate pole position; results in italics indicate fastest lap)

| Year | Entrant | Engine | Tyres | Drivers | Grands Prix | | | | | | | | | | | | | | | | | | | | | Points | WCC |
| Year | Entrant | Engine | Tyres | Drivers | AUS | BHR | CHN | RUS | ESP | MON | CAN | EUR | AUT | GBR | HUN | GER | BEL | ITA | SIN | MAL | JPN | USA | MEX | BRA | ABU | Points | WCC |
|---|---|---|---|---|---|---|---|---|---|---|---|---|---|---|---|---|---|---|---|---|---|---|---|---|---|---|---|
| 2016 | Haas F1 Team | Ferrari 061 | **P** | | | | | | | | | | | | | | | | | | | | | | | | |
| 2016 | Haas F1 Team | Ferrari 061 | **P** | Romain Grosjean | 6 | 5 | 19 | 8 | Ret | 13 | 14 | 13 | 7 | Ret | 14 | 13 | 13 | 11 | DNS | Ret | 11 | 10 | 20 | DNS | 11 | **29** | **8th** |
| 2016 | Haas F1 Team | Ferrari 061 | **P** | Esteban Gutiérrez | Ret | Ret | 14 | 17 | 11 | 11 | 13 | 16 | 11 | 16 | 13 | 11 | 12 | 13 | 11 | Ret | 20 | Ret | 19 | Ret | 12 | **29** | **8th** |
