= Haas VF-17 =

Haas Formula One car

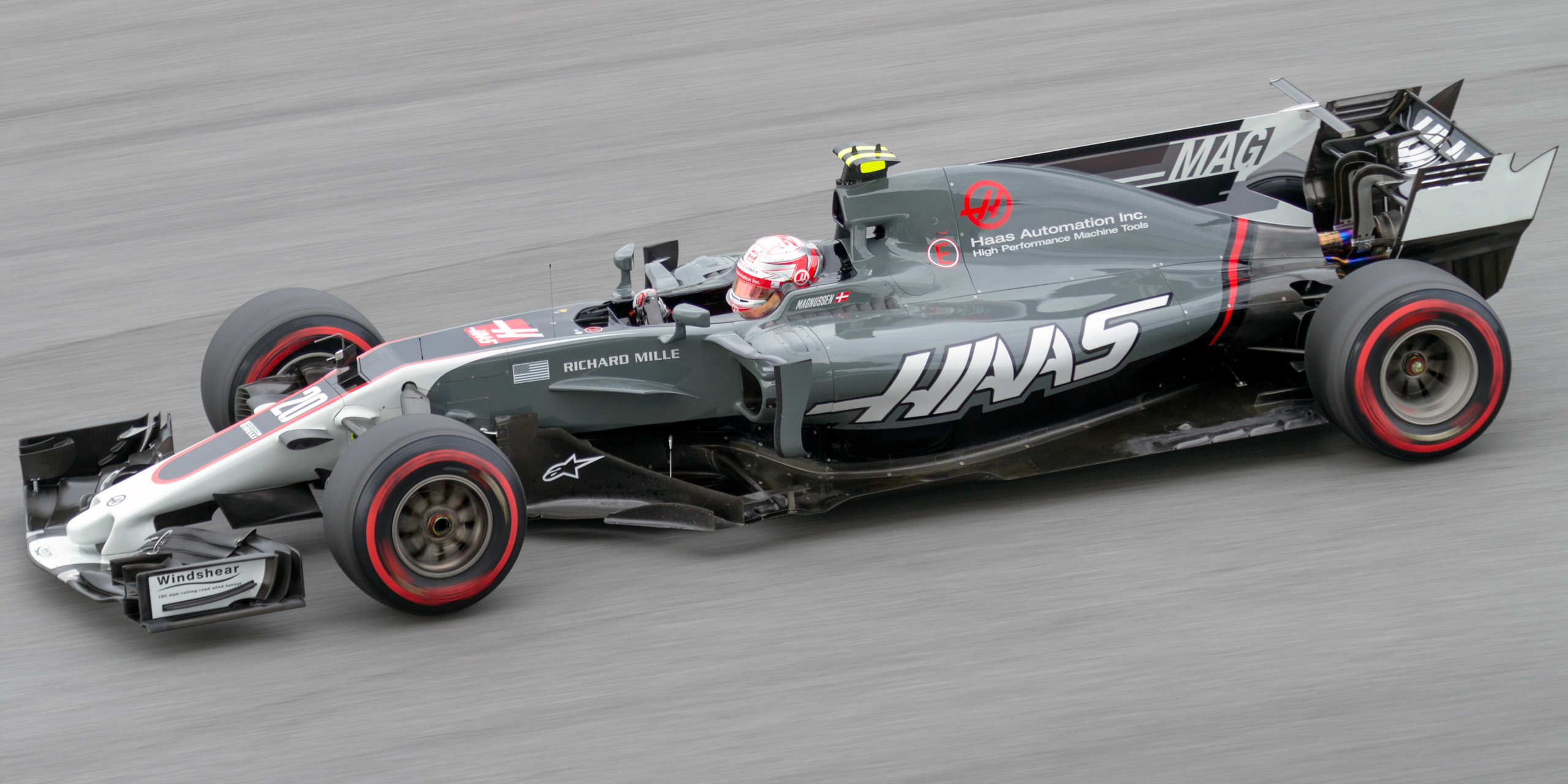
- Kevin Magnussen driving the VF-17 at the Malaysian Grand Prix
- Category: Formula One
- Constructor: Haas
- Designers: Rob Taylor (Chief Designer); Ben Agathangelou (Chief Aerodynamicist); Stephen Mahon (Deputy Head of Aerodynamics)
- Predecessor: Haas VF-16
- Successor: Haas VF-18

Technical specifications
- Chassis: Carbon-fibre monocoque with honeycomb structure
- Suspension (front): Independent suspension, push-rod activated torsion springs front and rear
- Suspension (rear): same as front
- Engine: Ferrari 062 1.6 L (98 cu in) direct injection V6 turbocharged engine, limited to 15,000 RPM Turbocharged in a mid-mounted, rear-wheel drive layout
- Electric motor: Kinetic and thermal energy recovery systems
- Transmission: Ferrari 8 Forward and 1 Reverse Gears sequential semi-automatic paddle-operated gearbox
- Battery: Ferrari lithium-ion batteries
- Weight: 1,605 lb (728 kg)
- Fuel: Shell V-Power
- Lubricants: Pennzoil
- Brakes: carbon-fiber disc brakes, pads and six-piston calipers
- Tyres: Pirelli P Zero (dry), Pirelli Cinturato (wet)

Competition history
- Notable entrants: Haas F1 Team
- Notable drivers: 8. (France) Romain Grosjean; 20. (Denmark) Kevin Magnussen
- Debut: 2017 Australian Grand Prix
- Last event: 2017 Abu Dhabi Grand Prix
Races	Wins	Podiums	Poles	F/Laps
20	0	0	0	0

The Haas VF-17 is a Formula One car designed by the Haas F1 team and built by Italian chassis manufacturer Dallara, for use in the 2017 Formula One season. The car was driven by Romain Grosjean and former Renault driver Kevin Magnussen, who replaced Esteban Gutiérrez at the end of the 2016 season. The car made its competitive début at the 2017 Australian Grand Prix.

== Season summary ==
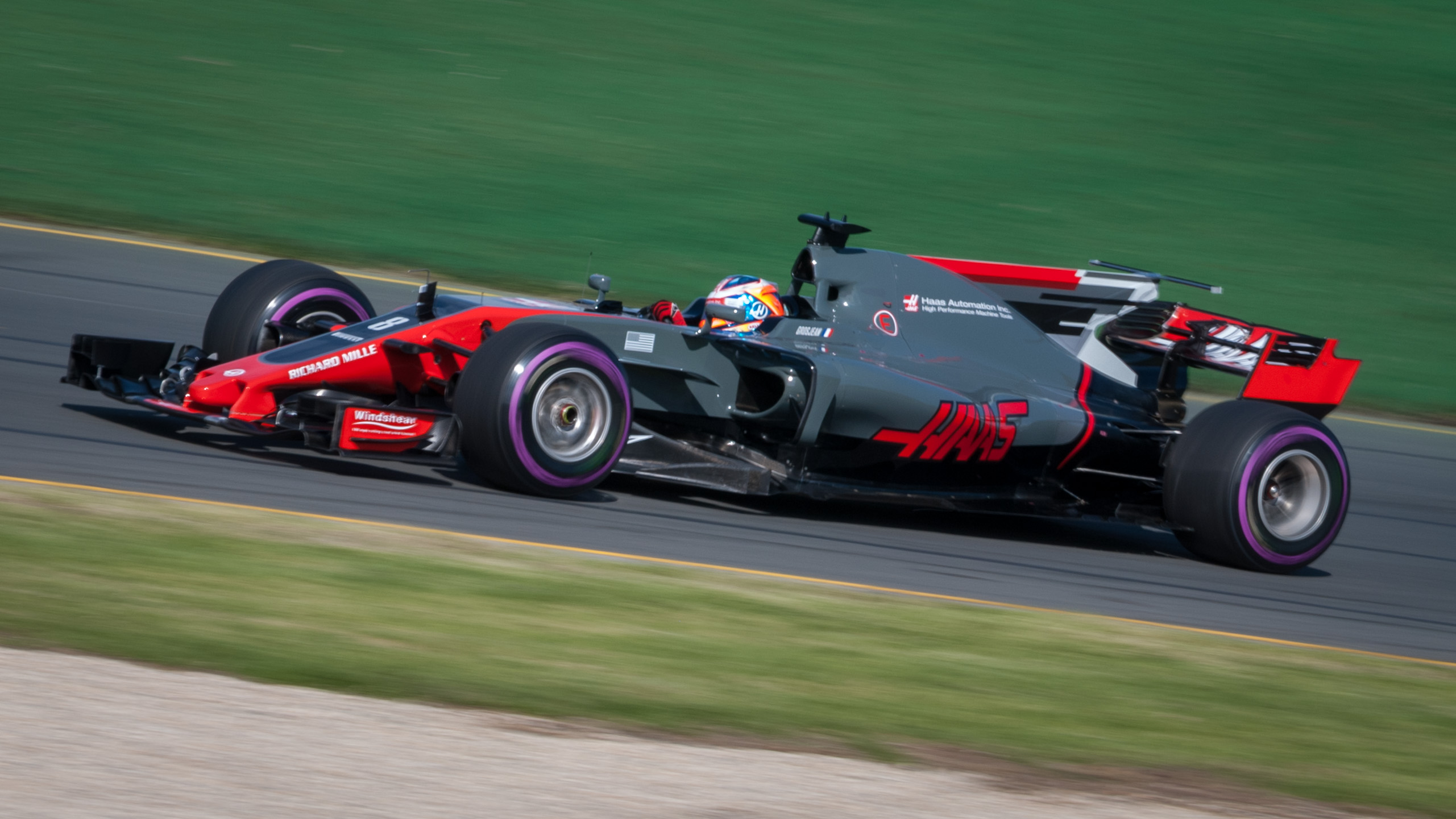
Grosjean at the season-opening Australian Grand Prix with the car in its original livery

The team also scored their first ever double points finish in their history at Monaco Grand Prix.

== Sponsorship and livery ==
At the Spanish Grand Prix, teams were required to add a driver identifier to their liveries; in the case of the Haas team, this is located on the "Shark fin" and consists of an abbreviation of the driver's surname. At the Monaco Grand Prix, the team made a livery change in which the red coloured areas of the car were replaced with a light grey colour. This change was made to make the larger driver numbers more visible. The team also had another livery change starting from the Belgian Grand Prix, with a more predominantly white front wing combined with a thinner red outline.

== Complete Formula One results ==
(key) (results in bold indicate pole position; results in italics indicate fastest lap)

Year	Entrant	Engine	Tyres	Drivers	Grands Prix																				Points	WCC
Year	Entrant	Engine	Tyres	Drivers	AUS	CHN	BHR	RUS	ESP	MON	CAN	AZE	AUT	GBR	HUN	BEL	ITA	SIN	MAL	JPN	USA	MEX	BRA	ABU	Points	WCC
2017	Haas F1 Team	Ferrari 062	**P**																							
2017	Haas F1 Team	Ferrari 062	**P**	Grosjean	Ret	11	8	Ret	10	8	10	13	6	13	Ret	7	15	9	13	9	14	15	15	11	47	8th
2017	Haas F1 Team	Ferrari 062	**P**	Magnussen	Ret	8	Ret	13	14	10	12	7	Ret	12	13	15	11	Ret	12	8	16	8	Ret	13	47	8th
