= Haas VF-18 =

2018 Formula One car

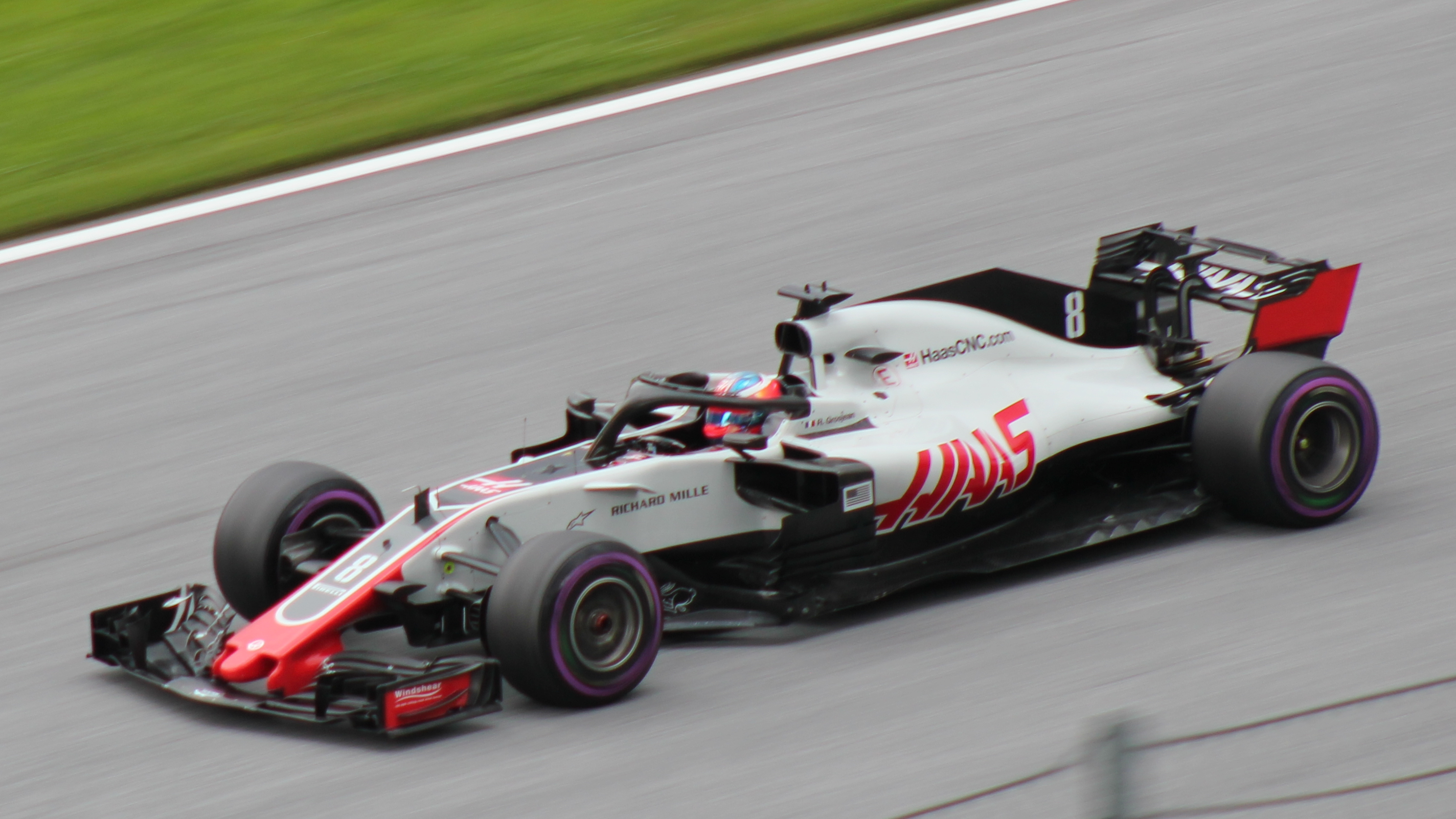
- The VF-18, driven by Romain Grosjean, during the Austrian Grand Prix
- Category: Formula One
- Constructor: Haas
- Designers: Rob Taylor (Chief Designer); Fabio Segalini (Deputy Chief Designer); Ben Agathangelou (Chief Aerodynamicist); Stephen Mahon (Deputy Head of Aerodynamics); Davide Paganelli (Head of Aerodynamic Operations)
- Predecessor: Haas VF-17
- Successor: Haas VF-19

Technical specifications
- Engine: Ferrari 062 EVO 1.6 L (98 cu in) direct injection V6 turbocharged engine limited to 15,000 RPM in a mid-mounted, rear-wheel drive layout
- Electric motor: Ferrari kinetic and thermal energy recovery systems
- Transmission: Eight forward and one reverse gears
- Fuel: Shell V-Power
- Lubricants: Pennzoil
- Tyres: Pirelli P Zero (dry), Pirelli Cinturato (wet)

Competition history
- Notable entrants: Haas F1 Team
- Notable drivers: 8. (France) Romain Grosjean; 20. (Denmark) Kevin Magnussen
- Debut: 2018 Australian Grand Prix
- Last event: 2018 Abu Dhabi Grand Prix
Races	Wins	Podiums	Poles	F/Laps
21	0	0	0	1

The Haas VF-18 is a Formula One car designed by Italian manufacturer Dallara for the Haas F1 Team to compete in the 2018 FIA Formula One World Championship. The car was driven by Romain Grosjean and Kevin Magnussen and made its competitive début at the 2018 Australian Grand Prix.

== Design and development ==
The focus of the VF-18's design was to produce a more stable chassis than its predecessor, the VF-17, with the aim of building a car capable of producing more consistent performances between rounds. To do this, Dallara worked to reduce the weight of the chassis as much as possible, allowing Haas more freedom in using ballast to influence the car's weight distribution.

The car was subject to scrutiny following its performances in pre-season testing and free practice sessions at the 2018 Australian Grand Prix. Questions were raised over similarities between the VF-18 and the Ferrari SF70H, the car entered by Haas' partner Ferrari in 2017 as the sporting and technical regulations ban the use of "customer cars", or cars developed by one constructor and sold on to another team. Team principal Guenther Steiner dismissed the claims, responding to critics by arguing that the team had only purchased parts from Ferrari that the FIA had approved for sale.

== Season summary ==
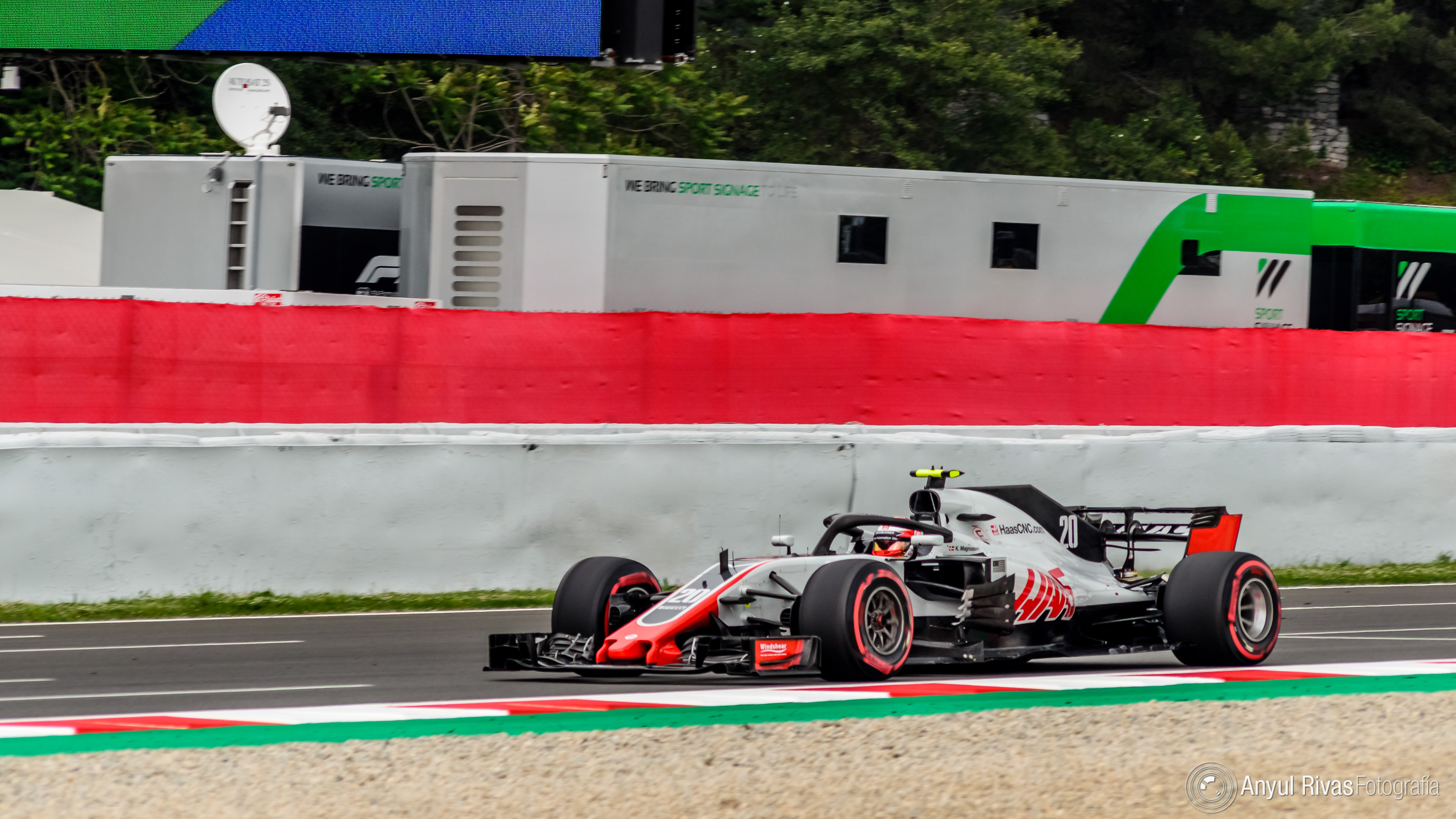
Magnussen at the Spanish Grand Prix

As of 2025, the VF-18 is Haas' most successful car, with 93 points to its name. The team achieved their best-ever combined result with Grosjean and Magnussen finishing fourth and fifth respectively during the Austrian Grand Prix, which coincidentally was their 50th Grand Prix entered.

This was the first Haas car to achieve a fastest lap, courtesy of Magnussen at the Singapore Grand Prix.

== Complete Formula One results ==
(key) (results in bold indicate pole position; results in italics indicate fastest lap)

Year	Entrant	Engine	Tyres	Drivers	Grands Prix																					Points	WCC
Year	Entrant	Engine	Tyres	Drivers	AUS	BHR	CHN	AZE	ESP	MON	CAN	FRA	AUT	GBR	GER	HUN	BEL	ITA	SIN	RUS	JPN	USA	MEX	BRA	ABU	Points	WCC
2018	Haas F1 Team	Ferrari 062 EVO	**P**	Grosjean	Ret	13	17	Ret	Ret	15	12	11	4	Ret	6	10	7	DSQ	15	11	8	Ret	16	8	9	93	5th
2018	Haas F1 Team	Ferrari 062 EVO	**P**	Magnussen	Ret	5	10	13	6	13	13	6	5	9	11	7	8	16	18	8	Ret	DSQ	15	9	10	93	5th
