= Haas VF-19 =

2019 Formula One car

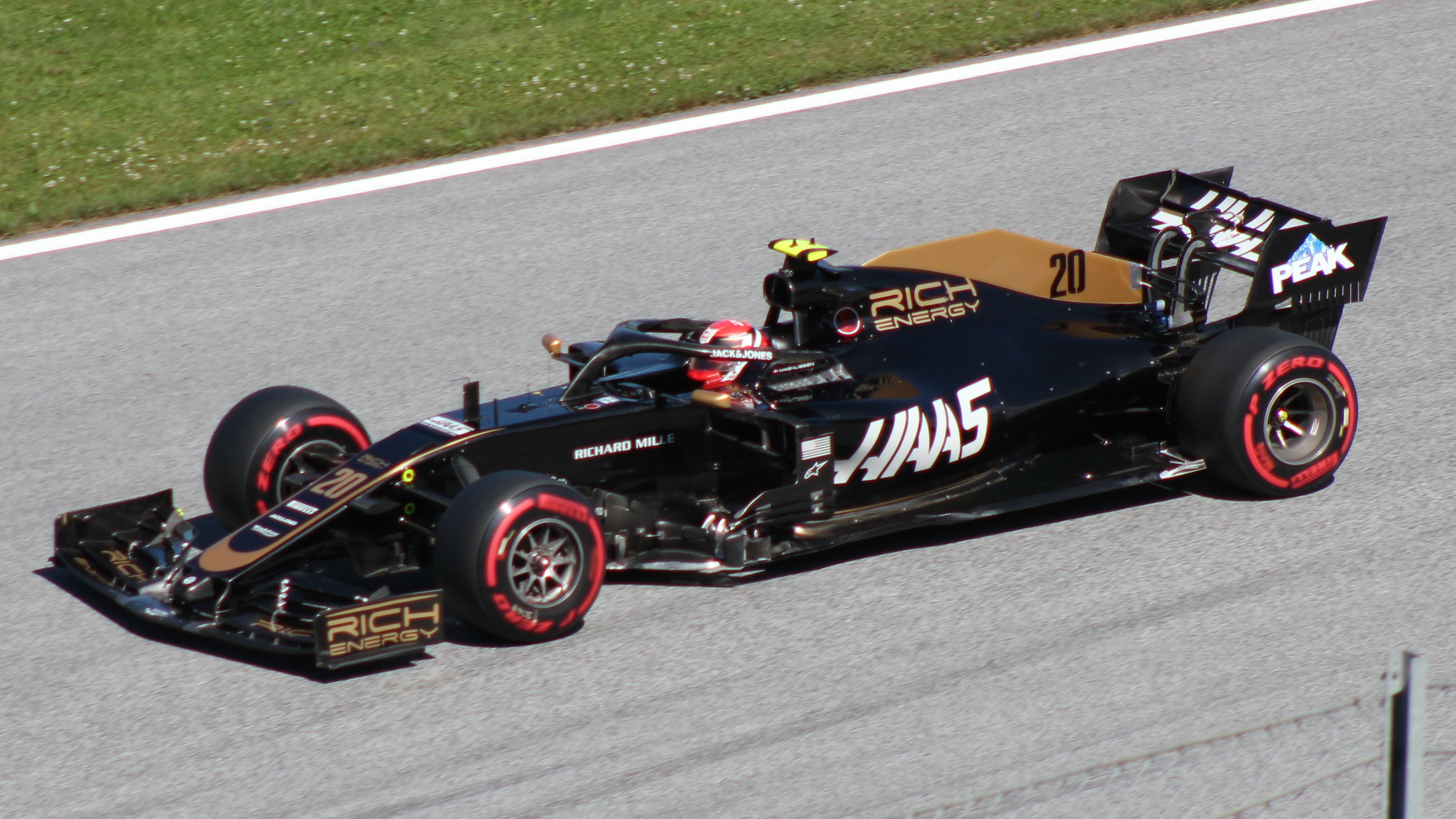
- Kevin Magnussen driving the VF-19 during the Austrian Grand Prix
- Category: Formula One
- Constructor: Haas
- Designers: Rob Taylor (Chief Designer); Fabio Segalini (Deputy Chief Designer); Ben Agathangelou (Chief Aerodynamicist); Stephen Mahon (Deputy Head of Aerodynamics); Davide Paganelli (Head of Aerodynamic Operations)
- Predecessor: Haas VF-18
- Successor: Haas VF-20

Technical specifications
- Chassis: Carbon fibre and honeycomb composite
- Suspension (front): Independent with push-rod activated torsion springs
- Suspension (rear): Independent with pull-rod activated torsion springs
- Width: 2,000 mm (79 in)
- Engine: Ferrari 064 1.6 L (98 cu in) direct injection V6 turbocharged engine limited to 15,000 RPM in a mid-mounted, rear-wheel drive layout
- Electric motor: Ferrari kinetic and thermal energy recovery systems
- Transmission: Ferrari semi-automatic gearbox with eight forward and one reverse gears
- Weight: 743 kg (1,638 lb) (including driver)
- Fuel: Shell V-Power
- Lubricants: Pennzoil
- Brakes: AP Racing carbon fibre discs, pads and calipers
- Tyres: Pirelli P Zero (dry), Pirelli Cinturato (wet); OZ Racing wheels

Competition history
- Notable entrants: Rich Energy Haas F1 Team (Rounds 1-14); Haas F1 Team (Rounds 15-21)
- Notable drivers: 8. (France) Romain Grosjean; 20. (Denmark) Kevin Magnussen
- Debut: 2019 Australian Grand Prix
- Last event: 2019 Abu Dhabi Grand Prix
Races	Wins	Podiums	Poles	F/Laps
21	0	0	0	1

The Haas VF-19 is a Formula One car designed by Italian manufacturer Dallara for the Haas F1 Team to compete in the 2019 FIA Formula One World Championship. The car was driven by Romain Grosjean and Kevin Magnussen, with additional testing work carried out by Pietro Fittipaldi. The VF-19 made its competitive debut at the 2019 Australian Grand Prix.

== Design and development ==
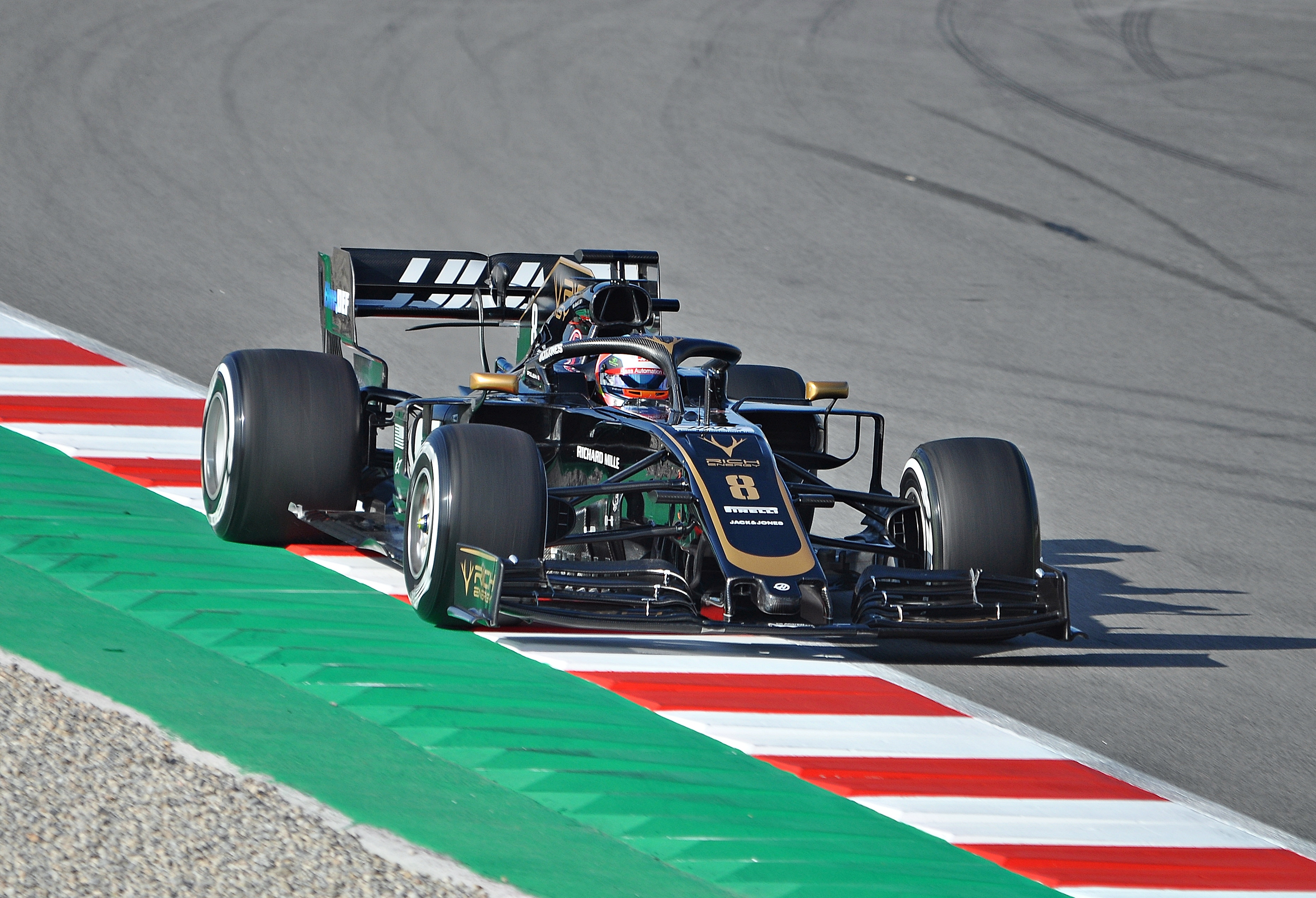
Grosjean during pre-season testing

The car was formally launched on February 18, 2019, at the pitlane of the Circuit de Barcelona-Catalunya, Spain, ahead of pre-season testing, with its livery having launched earlier on February 7, 2019, through online renderings, as well as a physical launch event at the Royal Automobile Club in Pall Mall, London. The car had its initial shakedown, during a filming day at the circuit, ahead of the initial Pre-season test.

The car was revealed to be in its initial development phase in July 2018, when the team announced that they would end the development cycle of its predecessor, the VF-18, in favour of concentrating work on the car for the next season. Due to the 2019 aerodynamic regulation changes, aimed at improving overtaking on track, the car featured a number of differences, with a wider, simplified front wing, a wider rear wing, and simplified brake ducts, alongside smaller bargeboards.

As with the previous seasons, the team purchased a number of components from its power unit supplier, Ferrari, with the team only manufacturing and designing the monocoque, crash structures and bodywork. This was done to ensure conformity to FIA Sporting and Technical regulations, which explicitly prohibited customer cars, and were necessary to be done in-house by the team, to be considered a constructor under the technical regulations. Similarly, Dallara was once again involved with the team for the chassis and wind tunnel work.

== Competition history ==
=== Opening rounds ===
During pre-season testing, the car regularly showed pace, and proved to be the fastest amongst the midfield runners, with the car being noted for its lap times, although it was noted to suffer from reliability related issues, which curtailed running. During the opening race of the season, the 2019 Australian Grand Prix, Kevin Magnussen finished 6th, from 7th on the grid, and was the first of the midfield runners to cross the finish line, seemingly validating the testing times. Romain Grosjean retired from the race, due to a damaged wheel nut, which subsequently failed mid-race following his pitstop.

However, in Bahrain, after both drivers qualified in the top 10, on Sunday, things proved different. While Grosjean saw himself eliminated from the race on lap 16, due to an opening lap collision with Lance Stroll, Magnussen fell backwards during the race, falling from 6th on the starting grid, to 13th at the finish line, with the Dane stating that his car suffered from a lack of straight-line speed during the race, which saw him being unable to defend his position on the long straights of Bahrain. Team Principal Guenther Steiner acknowledged this, while noting that the car seemed to be unable to get the tyres into the optimal tyre temperature.

At China, due to both cars being unable to complete a lap in Q3, both cars qualified P9 and P10. However, in spite of both cars entering Q3 once more, and a new rear wing being introduced, the team continued to struggle with tyre temperatures, with both drivers finishing outside of the top ten, with Grosjean finishing just outside the points in P11, and Magnussen finishing P13, with him noting that the window of optimal tire performance for Haas was very small, and that the issues seemed to stem from the tyres. Team Principal Guenther Steiner later acknowledged this in an interview, saying that the issue of tyres was not present in pre-season testing or Australia, due to the presence of high-speed corners and relatively short straights, which were better for the car, and allowed the car to heat the tyres more effectively, compared to Shanghai and Bahrain.

At Azerbaijan, the team failed to enter Q3 for the first time in the season, with Grosjean being eliminated in Q1, coming in 17th, while Magnussen advanced to Q2, finishing in 14th. However, Magnussen would start 12th and Grosjean 14th, due to 15th-placed qualifier Pierre Gasly starting from the pit lane due to a weighbridge infringement, while eighth-placed qualifier Antonio Giovinazzi was issued a 10-position grid penalty for the fitting of a new set of Control Electronics, and Kimi Räikkönen was excluded from qualifying due to his car failing a front wing deflection test. Magnussen would ultimately finish the race 13th, while Grosjean retired, following a brake issue.

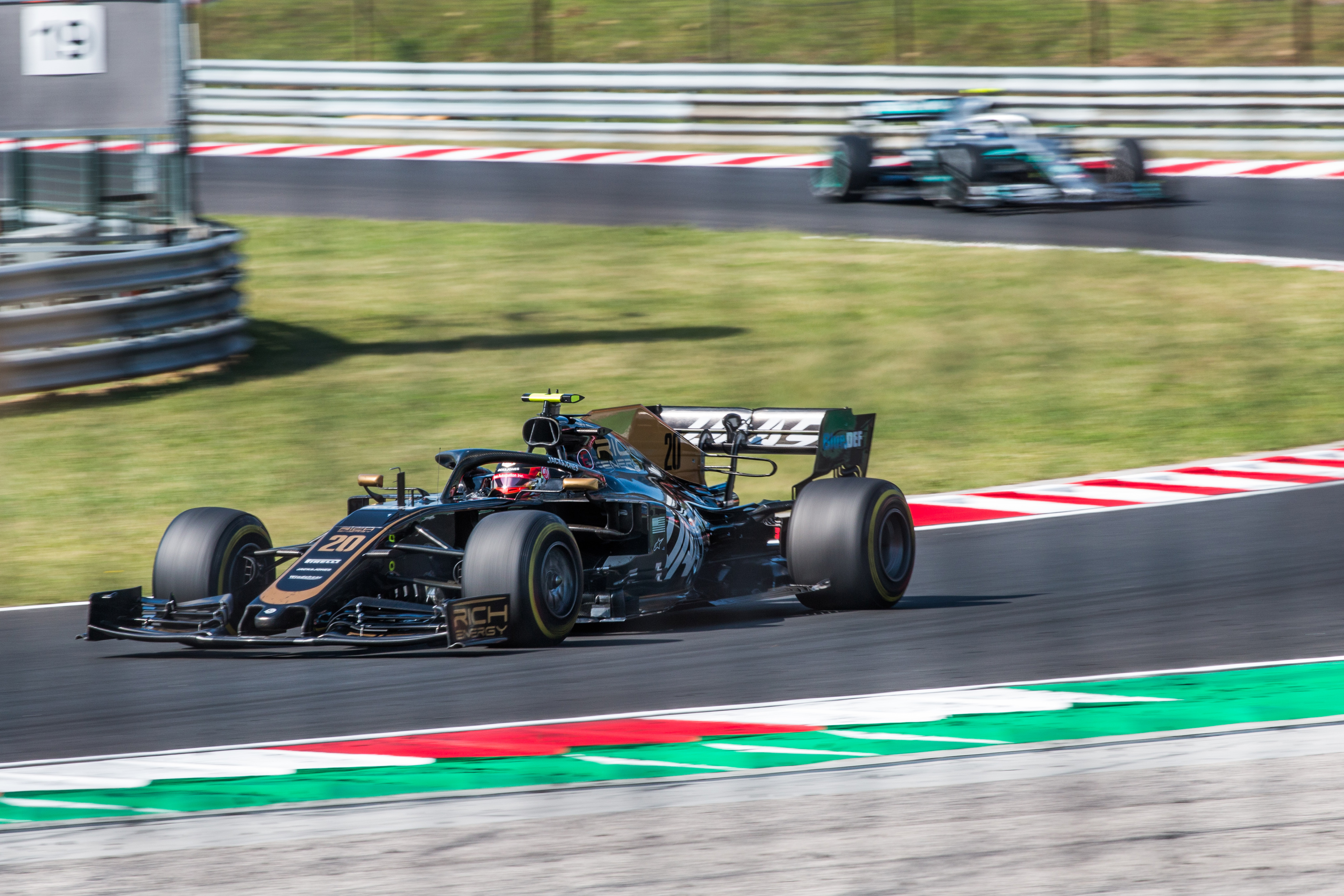
Magnussen driving the German GP specification of the car; Magnussen would run with an altered version of this package until the Russian Grand Prix.

For the Spanish Grand Prix, Haas brought a new update package, with only Grosjean running the update on Friday, as the team sought to evaluate the update and ensure that the update was working as planned, and to avoid confusion over the impact of the new parts on the tyre issues. After the updated car of Grosjean demonstrated strong pace during practice, it was later applied to the sister car of Magnussen. With the new update applied, both cars managed to re-enter Q3, with Grosjean finishing Q3 in 7th, and Magnussen in 8th. During the race, the cars would finish 7th and 10th, with the team scoring its first double points finish for the team, while Grosjean would score his first point of the season in 10th. This result however, was overshadowed by a 2 mid race clashes between the drivers, which saw Magnussen force Grosjean wide at turn two, and into the asphalt run-off, causing him to lose positions dropping from 7th to 10th.

=== Developmental issues ===
Throughout the season the team struggled to correctly operate the new Pirelli tyres which were introduced for the 2019 season, even after a major upgrade package was introduced at the Spanish Grand Prix. A second upgrade package was introduced at the Canadian Grand Prix. Despite these changes the car continued to show pace during qualifying but displayed poor performance in race setup, as illustrated by Magnussen qualifying 5th in Austria, and starting from 10th but finishing the race in 19th behind the Williams of George Russell, who had started from the pitlane.

Subsequently, at the British Grand Prix, the car of Grosjean was reverted to its original Melbourne specification to determine if the upgrades had failed. However, the two drivers collided early in the race with both receiving punctures and retiring, resulting in the team losing an opportunity to compare car specifications. Haas Team Principal Guenther Steiner later declared the car as being the strangest he had worked with, saying that even as the championship reached its mid-point, the team was still struggling to understand the car with the split-specification tests proving inconclusive. The tyre struggles and tendency for inconsistent performance were said to have an impact on the design choices for team's challenger for the 2020 season.

Prior to the Belgian Grand Prix, Haas announced that the split-specification experiment would cease and both drivers would use a revised version of the package introduced on Magnussen's car in Germany, and later used in Hungary. However, at the Singapore Grand Prix following a data mismatch during Friday practice, the team elected to revert Grosjean to a hybrid Melbourne specification package with the floor, bargeboards and rear wing being from the first race and the front wing left unchanged.

== Livery ==
The VF-19 sported a black and gold livery, reflecting with their title sponsor Rich Energy. However, the sponsorship was terminated at the Italian Grand Prix and the logos were removed from the Singapore Grand Prix onwards.

== Complete Formula One results ==
(key)

Year	Entrant	Engine	Tyres	Drivers	Grands Prix																					Points	WCC
Year	Entrant	Engine	Tyres	Drivers	AUS	BHR	CHN	AZE	ESP	MON	CAN	FRA	AUT	GBR	GER	HUN	BEL	ITA	SIN	RUS	JPN	MEX	USA	BRA	ABU	Points	WCC
2019	Haas F1 Team (Note: Haas entered rounds 1–14 as "Rich Energy Haas F1 Team".)	Ferrari	P	Romain Grosjean	Ret	Ret	11	Ret	10	10	14	Ret	16	Ret	7	Ret	13	16	11	Ret	13	17	15	13	15	28	9th
2019	Haas F1 Team	Ferrari	P	Kevin Magnussen	6	13	13	13	7	14	17	17	19	Ret	8	13	12	Ret	17^{F}	9	15	15	18^{†}	11	14	28	9th

^{†} Driver failed to finish the race, but was classified as they had completed over 90% of the winner's race distance.
