= Arrows the Ambassador =

Arrows the Ambassador (also known as Arrows International) was a Jamaican sound system from the east side of Kingston, Jamaica, with a sometimes violent following. Arrows worked with producers such as Clive Chin. The system was founded by Philip Linton, Sr., who operated it with his brother. The system broke up in the late 1980s, after which Linton founded Arrows Recording Company and later Arrows Studio, on Windward Road, Kingston which became "one of Jamaica's absolute full-service audio facilities." Members included Rupert Willington and Justin Hinds, who joined after breaking up with Winston Rodney.
