= Gene Haas =

American businessman (born 1952)

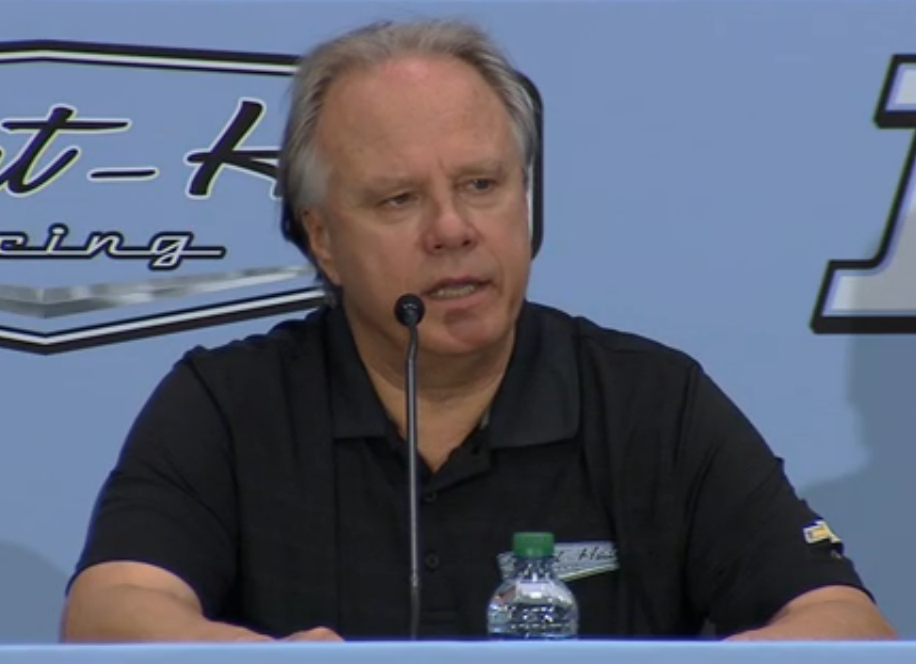
- Haas in 2015
- Born: Gene Francis Haas; November 12, 1952 (age 73); Youngstown, Ohio, U.S.
- Education: California State University, Northridge (BS)
- Occupations: Founder of Haas Automation, Haas F1 Team, Haas CNC Racing, Stewart–Haas Racing, and Haas Factory Team

Gene Francis Haas (born November 12, 1952) is the American founder, president, and sole stockholder of Haas Automation, a CNC machine tool manufacturer. He also has founded the NASCAR teams Haas CNC Racing, Stewart–Haas Racing and Haas Factory Team, as well as the Formula One team, Haas F1 Team.

== Haas Automation ==
Haas graduated from California State University, Northridge in 1975 with a Bachelor of Science degree in accounting and finance. He originally majored in engineering but switched to business after Lockheed nearly went bankrupt. However, his summer machine shop jobs paid the same amount as the work he was able to find after graduation so he kept working as a machinist and CNC programmer and in 1978 hired two people to work with him in his small machine shop he named Pro-turn Engineering.

In 1980, Haas noticed that it took one of his employees a long time to manually position an indexer. Haas thought that building his own indexer with a stepper motor drive would be more efficient. He built one for himself and a few more for other machine shops. In March 1983, he displayed his indexer at WESTEC (an industry expo). After seeing the positive reaction of attendees, he decided to form Haas Automation to mass-produce them. His first commercial product, the HBI-5C (Haas Brothers Indexer), sold well because it was programmable and inexpensive. In 1986, Haas and a partner were awarded a US patent for their invention.

In 1988, Haas started production on a fully enclosed CNC machine priced well below the competition.

By 1996, Haas had outgrown its facilities in Chatsworth, California, and began a search that ultimately brought it to Oxnard, California. In March 1997, the move was completed into the Oxnard factory, a 420,000-square-foot (39,000 m^{2}) facility. By 2005, the factory had been expanded to 1,000,000 square feet (93,000 m^{2}).

Haas Automation is now the largest machine tool manufacturer in the United States. Sales for 2014 reached a record, reportedly exceeding $1 billion worldwide.

== Auto racing ==
=== NASCAR ===
In 2002, Haas formed a NASCAR race team, Haas CNC Racing. After purchasing the Concord, North Carolina–based Craftsman Truck race facility from Hendrick Motorsports, Haas CNC Racing began work on its first entry in the Winston Cup (now known as the NASCAR Cup Series) Series as a single-car team. The first entry for the new team was September 30, 2002, with driver Jack Sprague, who finished 35th after a crash. The team raced only three times in 2002. By 2003 the team was running full-time with several driver changes over the season. The team won its first race in the then-Busch Series in 2004 with driver Jason Leffler. By 2006 the team had relocated to a new, state-of-the-art facility in Kannapolis, North Carolina, and was fielding a full-time two car team in the Cup Series. At the end of 2008, the team was still struggling with a career-average finish of just under 27th place.

Late in 2008, Haas announced that he would join forces with driver Tony Stewart; Stewart would drive for the team and in return would be given a 50% stake in the company. Stewart led the points for much of 2009, winning four times at Pocono, Daytona, Watkins Glen, and Kansas, ending up sixth in points. Stewart had a mediocre 2010 before picking up wins at Atlanta and Fontana, while Newman won at Phoenix. Stewart won the 2011 Sprint Cup Championship, winning five of the ten Chase races.

Haas was present at the first team win in May 2009 when Stewart won the All-Star Race. Haas also joined Stewart on the podium at Homestead-Miami Speedway on November 20, 2011, as Stewart won the Ford EcoBoost 400 that day and claimed his third Sprint Cup Championship. Stewart-Haas won their second Cup title with Kevin Harvick in 2014. On September 30, 2015, Stewart announced his retirement from the Cup Series as a driver following the 2016 season.

The team closed after the 2024 season. Haas opened Haas Factory Team, solely owned by him in 2025.

With Cole Custer's victory in the Truck Series event at New Hampshire in September 2014, Haas joined a select club of owners who have won as an owner in all three national touring series, joining Rick Hendrick, Richard Childress, Jack Roush, Bill Davis and Dale Earnhardt.

=== Formula One ===
In January 2014, Haas confirmed that he had formally submitted to the FIA his interest in entering a team in the F1 championship in 2015 or 2016, initially named Haas Formula and Haas Racing Developments. On April 11, 2014, Haas announced that he had been granted a license from the FIA. On May 28, however, it was revealed that the team would delay its debut until 2016, with Haas officially confirming the postponement on June 4. In September 2014, the team took up its current name of Haas F1 Team to better promote its involvement in the chosen sport. In December 2014, it was further reported that Haas purchased major assets from the bankrupted Marussia F1 team, which was confirmed in early 2015.

=== Wind Shear wind tunnel ===
In 2006, planning began for a commercial wind tunnel. Haas commissioned California-based Triliad Development to oversee the project. The facility was designed to be the most advanced automotive wind tunnel in the world. The facility is centered on an MTS rolling road which allows a car to be restrained in place directly on top of a massive tread mill-like machine with a 70-foot-long (21 m) by 10-foot-wide (3.0 m) by 1 mm thick stainless steel belt rotating at speeds up to 180 miles per hour (290 km/h). The rolling road accurately simulates the dynamics of a car on the race track, unlike traditional fixed-floor tunnels. Construction of the new wind tunnel began in 2007 and was completed by year-end. After six months of commissioning, the wind tunnel opened to its first customer, a Formula One race team, in July 2008. Today the Wind Shear facility counts numerous NASCAR, IndyCar, Formula One and American Le Mans Series teams as customers. Wind Shear is owned 100% by Haas.

== Philanthropic activities ==
Haas Automation and Haas were the recipient of the Roy Pinkerton Award, presented by United Way, Ventura County Chapter. Many engineering colleges have "CNC Labs" outfitted with machines he donated, including California Polytechnic State University (Cal Poly), California State University, Channel Islands, California State University, Northridge, and De Anza College.

Haas also has been a donor to two-year colleges, most recently Danville Community College through the award of a $1 million grant in April 2015 to support an Associate of Applied Science degree program in Integrated Machining Technology. The program, which will be housed in the Gene Haas Center for Integrated Machining in Danville, Virginia, will build upon the college's existing 80-credit Precision Machining Technology two-year diploma program.

=== The Gene Haas Foundation ===
The Gene Haas Foundation was founded in 1999 to provide grants to Ventura County community charities as the Boys and Girls Clubs, Food Share, Rescue Mission, and others.

The Foundation later expanded its mission to helping create more skilled manufacturing employees through the support of training and educational programs that include manufacturing, mostly in North America but also worldwide. To do this, the foundation provides scholarship grants, sponsoring individual and team competitions that use CNC manufacturing technologies (such as the foundation's extensive sponsoring of FIRST Robotics Competition teams), and supporting CNC training programs. In 2022, the Gene Haas Foundation provided more than $27 million in grants, bringing the total donations of the foundation since its foundation to more than $175 million.

== Criminal tax evasion ==
On June 19, 2006, Haas was arrested by IRS agents on suspicion of filing false tax returns, witness intimidation, and conspiracy. Four others were indicted together with Haas, all of whom pleaded guilty.

Just before Haas's case was to go to trial, a plea agreement was reached, whereby he would plead guilty to felony conspiracy to commit tax evasion. He was sentenced to two years in prison and ordered to pay $75 million in restitution.

Haas was incarcerated beginning January 2008 and was released on probation on May 7, 2009, after serving 16 months of his two-year sentence.
