= Haas F1 Team =

American Formula One team

(United States) Haas-Ferrari
- Full name: TGR Haas F1 Team
- Base: Kannapolis, North Carolina, U.S. (Main); Banbury, Oxfordshire, England (European); Maranello, Modena, Italy (Design Office)
- Team principal(s): Gene Haas; (Team Owner & Chairman); Joe Custer; (COO); Ayao Komatsu; (Team Principal)
- Technical director: Andrea De Zordo
- Founder(s): Gene Haas
- Website: haasf1team.com

2026 Formula One World Championship
- Race drivers: 31. (France) Esteban Ocon; 87. (United Kingdom) Oliver Bearman; 50. (Japan) Ryo Hirakawa; 51. (Brazil) Rafael Câmara
- Test driver(s): 7. (Australia) Jack Doohan; 50. (Japan) Ryo Hirakawa
- Chassis: VF-26
- Engine: Ferrari
- Tyres: Pirelli

Formula One World Championship career
- First entry: 2016 Australian Grand Prix
- Last entry: 2026 Las Vegas Grand Prix
- Races entered: 235
- Engines: Ferrari
- Constructors' Championships: 0
- Drivers' Championships: 0
- Race victories: 0
- Podiums: 0
- Points: 417
- Pole positions: 1
- Fastest laps: 3
- 2025 position: 8th (79 pts)

Haas Formula LLC, competing as TGR Haas F1 Team, is an American-licensed Formula One (F1) racing team established by NASCAR Cup Series team owner Gene Haas in April 2014. The team made its debut in the 2016 season. The team principal is Ayao Komatsu, who replaced Guenther Steiner who served in the role from the team's inception until his resignation in January 2024.

Haas is headquartered in Kannapolis, North Carolina, United States, 31 mi (50 km) from Charlotte, alongside sister team and NASCAR entrant Haas Factory Team, although the two teams are separate entities. The team also established a forward base in Banbury, England, to turn cars around between races during the European part of the calendar. The team maintains a design office in Maranello, which is also home to Scuderia Ferrari's headquarters.

== Background ==
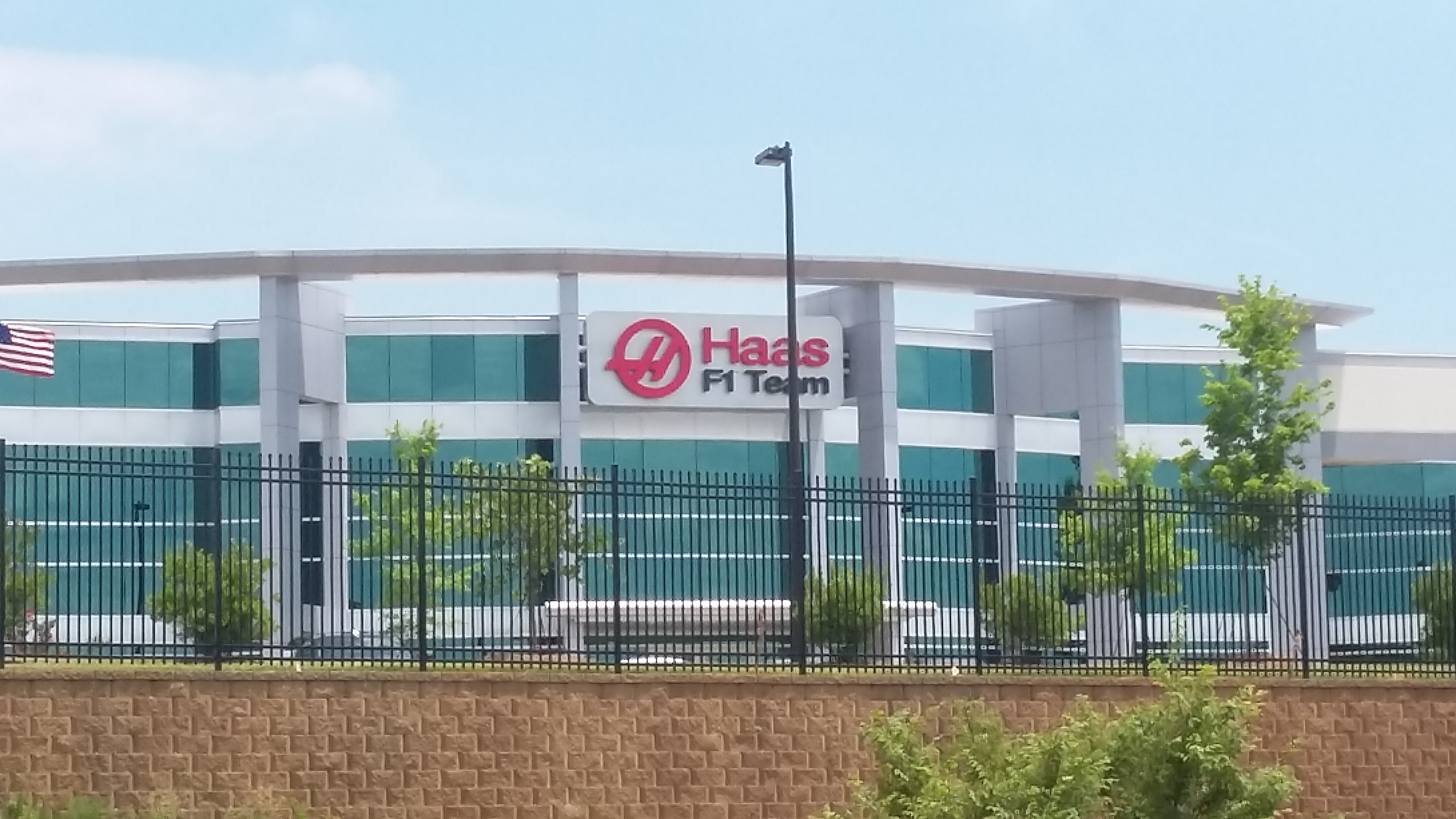
The team's American headquarters in Kannapolis, North Carolina

Haas was the first American constructor to submit an F1 entry after the failed US F1 project in 2010, and is the first American constructor to compete since the unrelated Haas Lola outfit raced in the 1985 and 1986 seasons. The Haas Lola team was owned by former McLaren boss Teddy Mayer and Carl Haas, who was not related to Gene Haas. Following the collapse of Marussia F1 during the 2014 season and the auctioning of their assets, Haas purchased the team's Banbury headquarters to serve as a forward base for their operations.

Prior to the team’s official entry, Guenther Steiner developed a formal business plan during the late-2000s economic recession, detailing the operational and financial model for a prospective Formula 1 team. According to Steiner, support from established Formula 1 figures, including Niki Lauda and Jean Todt, played a role in securing the necessary approval for the team’s entry.

Unrestricted by testing regulations until the time they actually entered Formula One, Haas shook its new car down in December 2015 ahead of official pre-season testing at Barcelona in early 2016. Haas approached Italian manufacturer Dallara to build their chassis, with a power unit supplied by Ferrari. Former Jaguar and Red Bull Racing technical director Guenther Steiner was the team principal for 10 years until 2024. Haas confirmed its new car had passed the mandatory FIA crash tests in January 2016.

== History ==
=== 2016 season ===
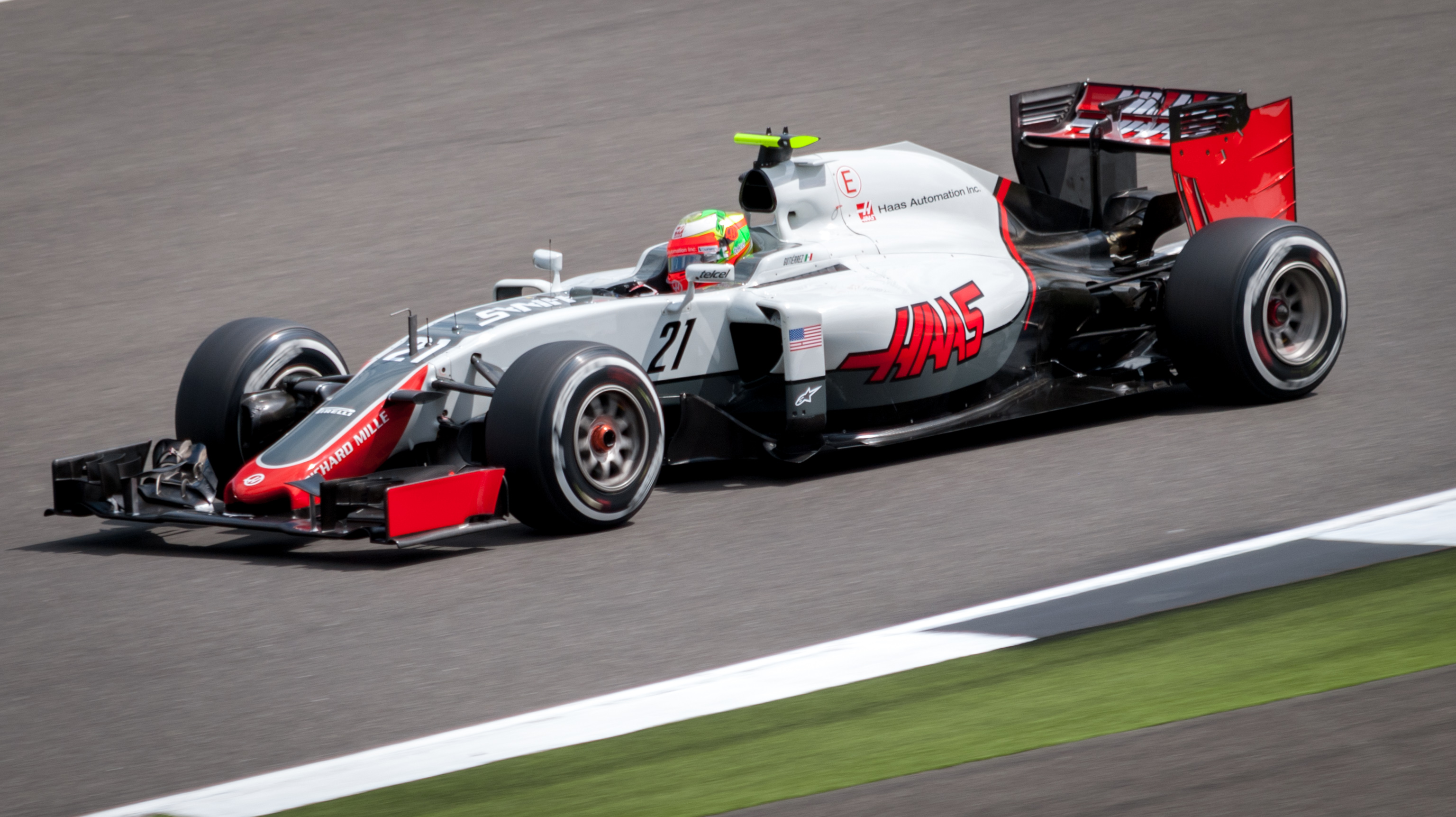
Gutiérrez driving for Haas at the 2016 British Grand Prix.

Romain Grosjean and Esteban Gutiérrez drove for the team in 2016. In the team's debut at the opening Australian Grand Prix, Grosjean finished 6th, scoring eight points for the team. This made Haas the first American constructor to win points in its first F1 race. At the same race, Gutiérrez crashed out during an incident which destroyed former world champion Fernando Alonso's McLaren and caused the race to be temporarily red-flagged. Another impressive race followed in Bahrain, where Grosjean finished 5th. However, for the rest of the season, the team fell off the pace, only scoring points on three more occasions. Grosjean picked up all 29 points en route to 8th in the Constructors' Championship.

=== 2017 season ===
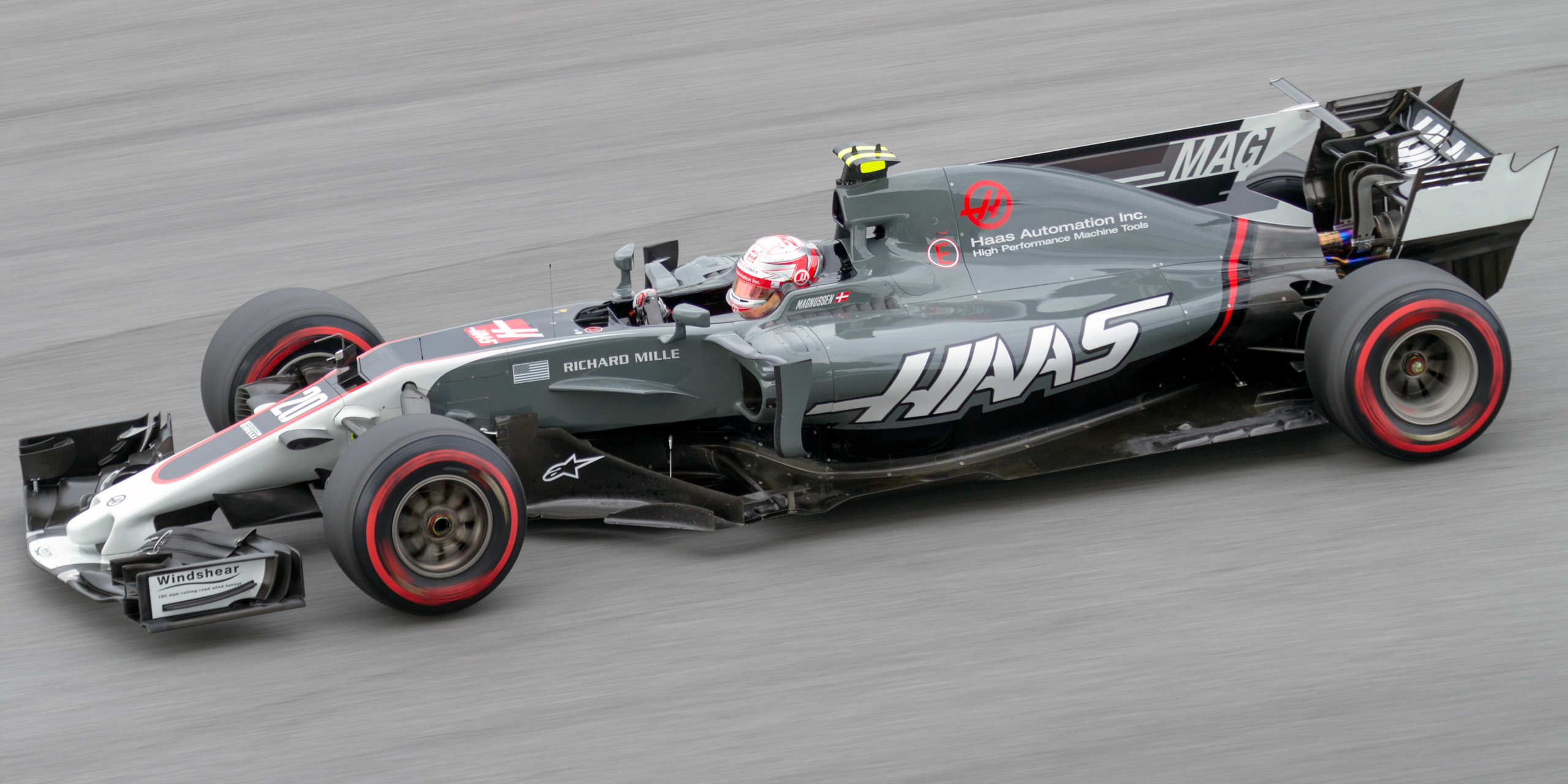
Magnussen driving the VF-17 at the 2017 Malaysian Grand Prix.

Kevin Magnussen drove alongside Grosjean in 2017, replacing Gutiérrez. In the first race of the season, the team scored its best-ever qualifying effort, with Grosjean piloting the VF-17 to 6th place. However, in the race, both cars were forced to retire with mechanical failures. The second race weekend proved better for the team with Magnussen finishing 8th, scoring his first points since his 10th-place finish at the 2016 Singapore Grand Prix, and Haas's first points since the 2016 United States Grand Prix, where Grosjean finished 10th. The team's success would continue in 2017 as Haas would go on to have their first double points finish in Monaco, with Grosjean and Magnussen finishing 8th and 10th respectively. The team finished 8th in the constructors' title for the second consecutive year after being surpassed by Renault during the final races.

=== 2018 season ===
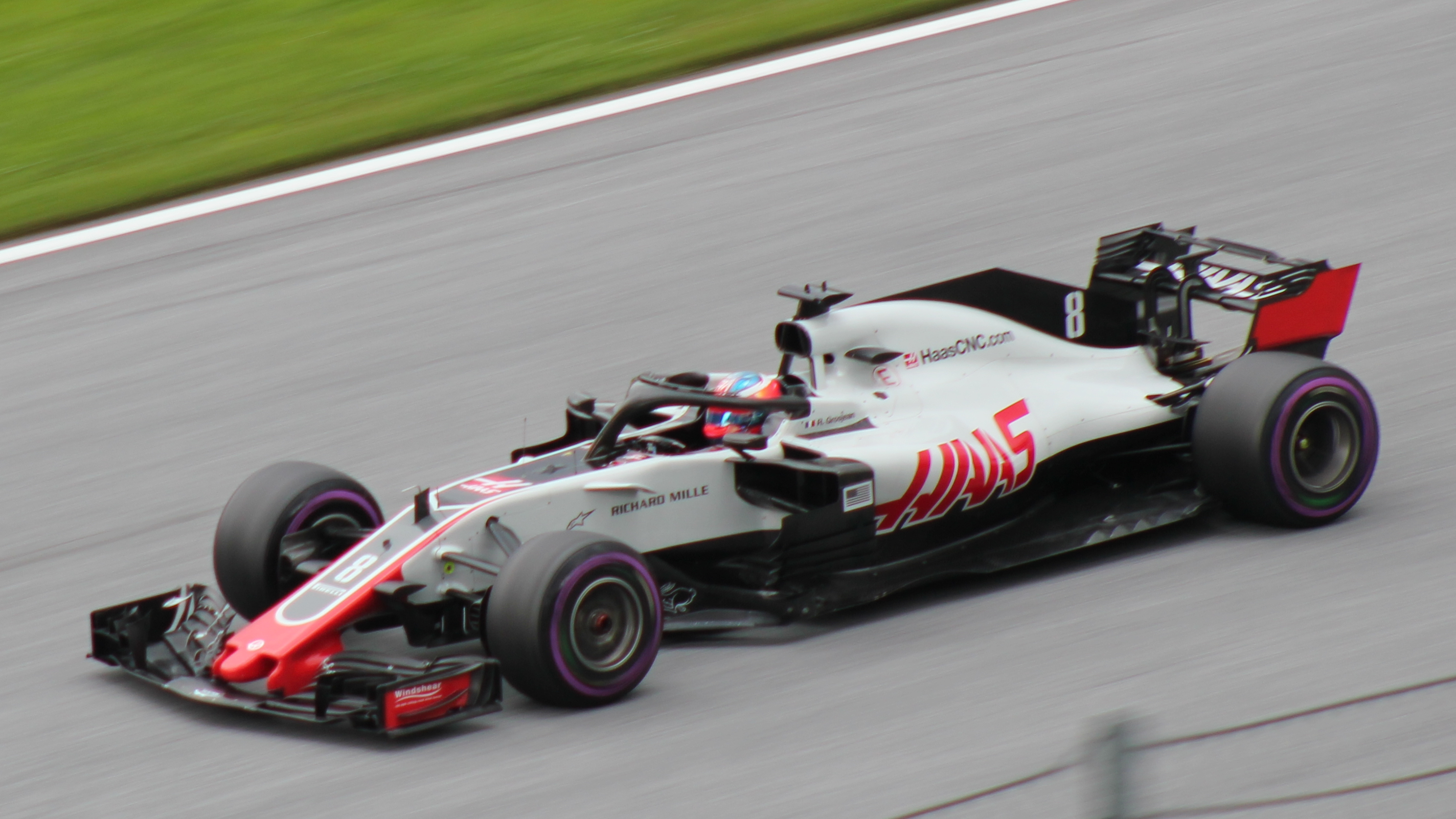
Grosjean driving the VF-18 at the 2018 Austrian Grand Prix.

In February 2018, Haas unveiled their new car, the VF-18. The design resulted in controversy, with some competitors calling for an investigation due to its resemblance to the previous year's Ferrari, the SF70H. Following a strong showing during winter testing, Haas had a competitive weekend in Australia with Magnussen starting 5th and Grosjean 6th. During the race, the two drivers were running in 4th and 5th, which would have given them the team's best result since its inception and half of their 2017 points tally, but both cars retired one lap after their respective pit stops. Gunther Steiner later stated in an interview that the pit-stop crew had cross-threaded the wheel nuts on both cars. The team would eventually match this 4th and 5th-place result in Austria, surpassing their 2017 points total after only nine races. At the Singapore Grand Prix, Magnussen scored Haas' first-ever fastest lap. 2018 was their best season to date, finishing fifth in the Constructors' Championship, one point short of doubling their previous year's performance.

=== 2019 season ===
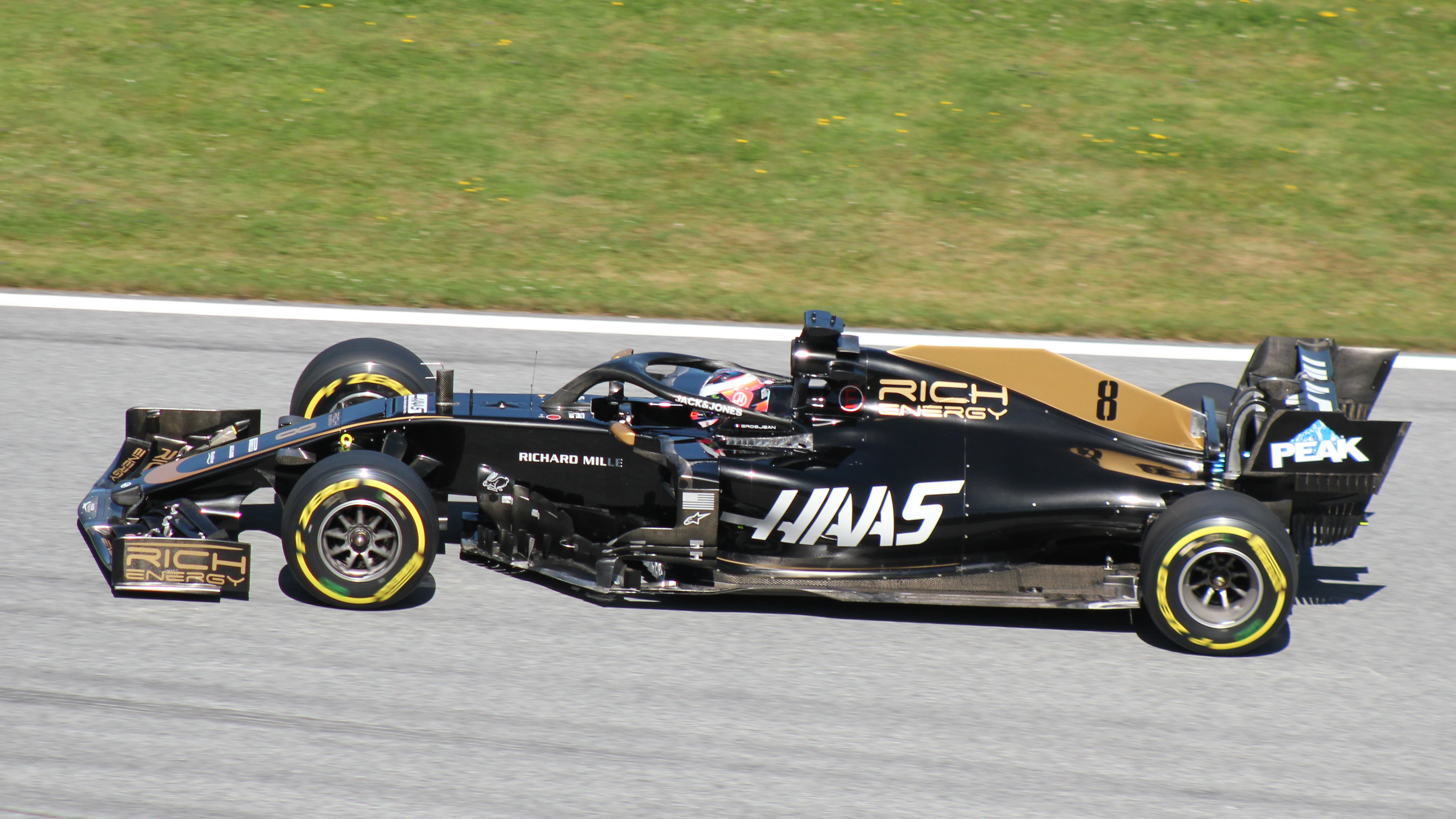
Grosjean driving the VF-19 at the 2019 Austrian Grand Prix.

The team retained their 2018 driver line up for the third consecutive year, consisting of Grosjean and Magnussen. The team also took on Rich Energy, a British energy drink company that was previously linked to an attempted purchase of Force India, as a title sponsor for 2019 and competed as Rich Energy Haas F1 Team. The VF-19 often showed impressive pace during qualifying but struggled during the race. At the opening race in Australia, Magnussen finished 6th in what would eventually be the team's best season result. The team's qualifying pace was evident in Austria, where Magnussen recorded the 5th-fastest time but finished the race in 19th with Grosjean 16th. In July, just four days before the British Grand Prix, the Rich Energy Twitter account announced that the sponsorship deal with Haas had been terminated, citing "poor performance". This was later denied by both the team and Rich Energy's shareholders, who asserted that the tweet was the result of a "rogue" individual.

For the British Grand Prix, the team elected to reverse the upgrades placed on Grosjean's car, using the same specification run in Australia, to determine the causes of the car's poor race pace. However, both drivers collided with each other on the first lap, causing a double retirement. The German Grand Prix provided the team's best-combined result of the season, being classified 7th and 8th after post-race penalties for other drivers. Title sponsor Rich Energy faced numerous legal issues during the year, including being found to have plagiarized the logo of bicycle manufacturer Whyte Bikes. In September, a day after the Italian Grand Prix, Rich Energy announced the termination of the deal with Haas with immediate effect. The team earned no points for the race at Monza, with Grosjean finishing only 16th and Magnussen retiring. Haas finished the season in 9th place in the Constructor's Championship with 28 points.

=== 2020 season ===
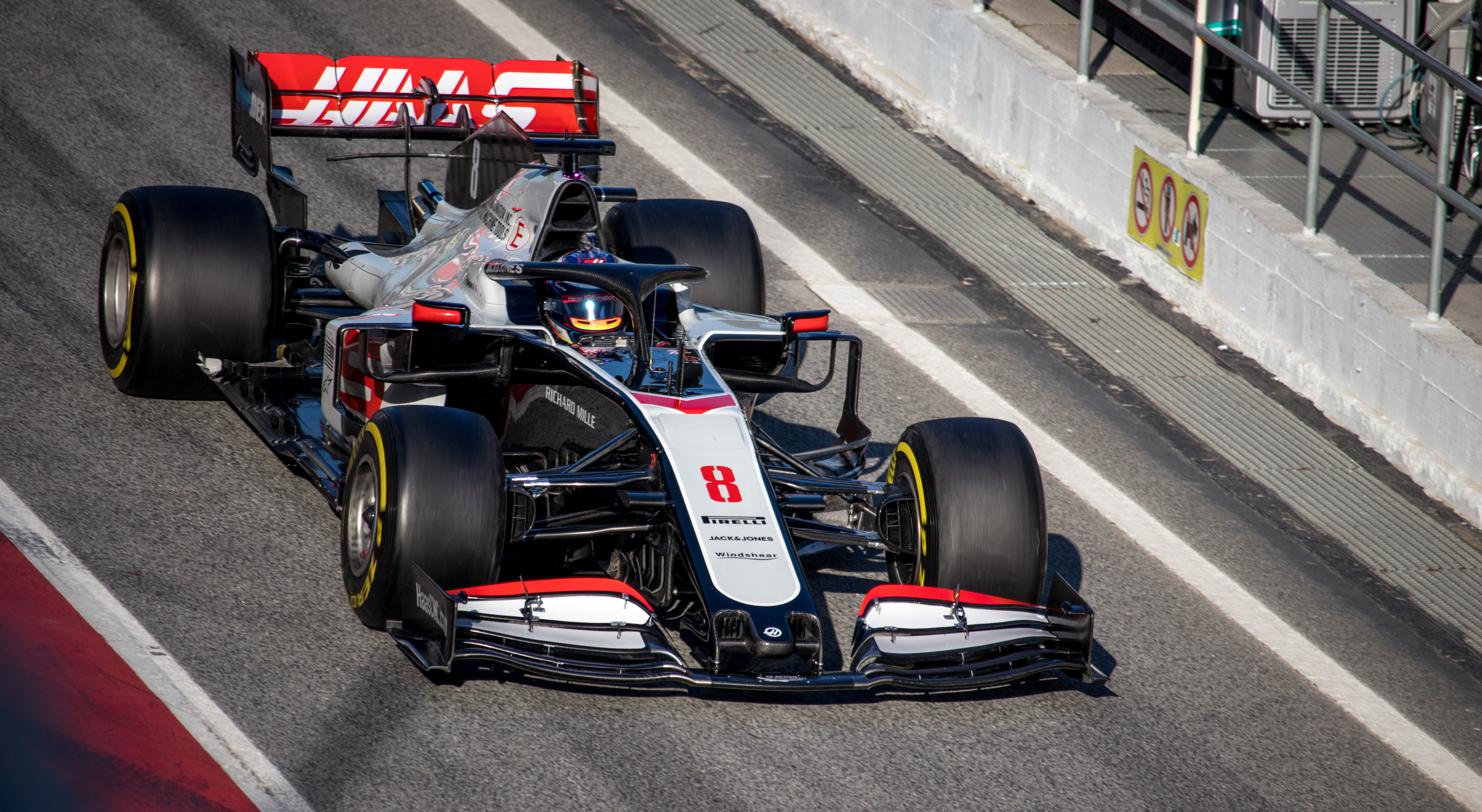
Grosjean driving the Haas VF-20 at pre-season testing in 2020

Haas once again kept an unchanged lineup of Grosjean and Magnussen for the 2020 season. On the opening lap of the Bahrain Grand Prix, Grosjean collided with AlphaTauri driver Daniil Kvyat and crashed through the barriers between turns 3 and 4. The impact resulted in the car splitting in two and bursting into flames. Grosjean escaped significant injury, suffering burns on his hands, and was hospitalized after the race. He remarked that the halo head protection device likely saved his life. The crash ruled him out for the rest of the season, with reserve driver Pietro Fittipaldi driving in his place at Sakhir and Abu Dhabi. During the season, Haas scored 3 points, with Magnussen finishing 9th in Hungary but receiving a time penalty that would drop him to 10th, and Grosjean finishing 9th in the Eifel Grand Prix. The team would not score again, finishing 9th in the Constructor's Championship.

=== 2021 season ===
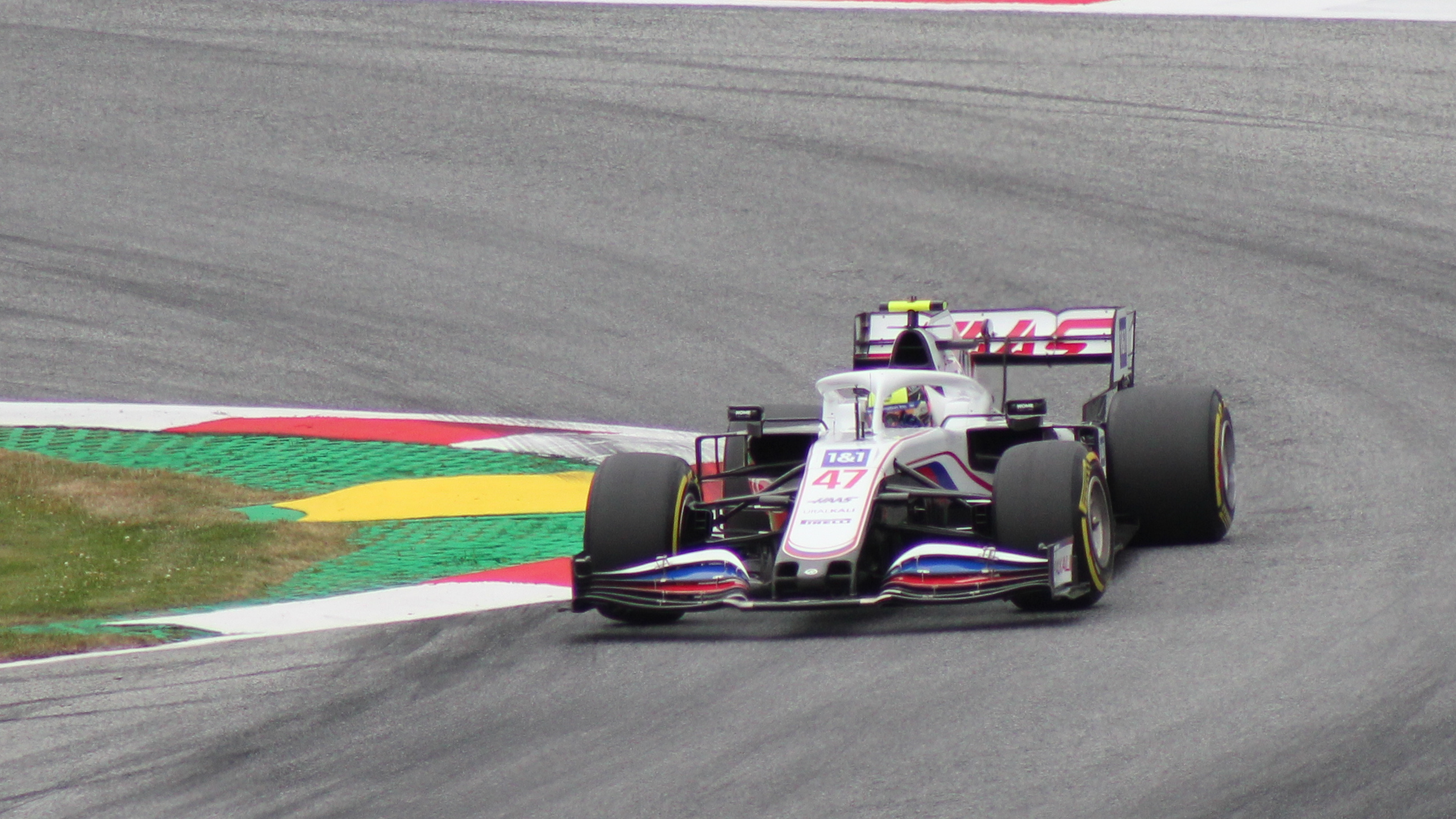
Schumacher driving the Haas VF-21 at the 2021 Austrian Grand Prix with a Russian flag–stylized livery

Grosjean and Magnussen left Haas at the end of the 2020 Championship. They were replaced by Russian Nikita Mazepin, and 2020 Formula 2 Championship winner Mick Schumacher, son of seven-time Formula One world champion Michael Schumacher. To survive financially, the team opted to halt the development of the 2021 car, instead focusing resources on the 2022 car. They also secured Uralkali, a Russian potash fertilizer producer, of which Mazepin's father Dmitry is a key shareholder, as the title sponsor for the team and competed as Uralkali Haas F1 Team. Uralkali's sponsorship resulted in a livery containing the colors of the Russian flag. Steiner denied this was to circumvent a World Anti-Doping Agency ban on the use of the Russian flag and anthem following a state-sponsored doping scandal in the country.

During the first race, Mazepin spun out on the first lap, while Schumacher finished 16th in his debut, the last of all running cars. In the season's final race, Mazepin tested positive for coronavirus and was ruled out of the race. Haas would only field one driver, rather than replace Mazepin with reserve driver Pietro Fittipaldi, as he had not fulfilled the requirement of having competed in a practice session for the team. Haas finished 10th in the Constructor's Championship scoring 0 points over the season, the team's worst finish since their founding in 2016 and their lowest ever points total.

=== 2022 season ===
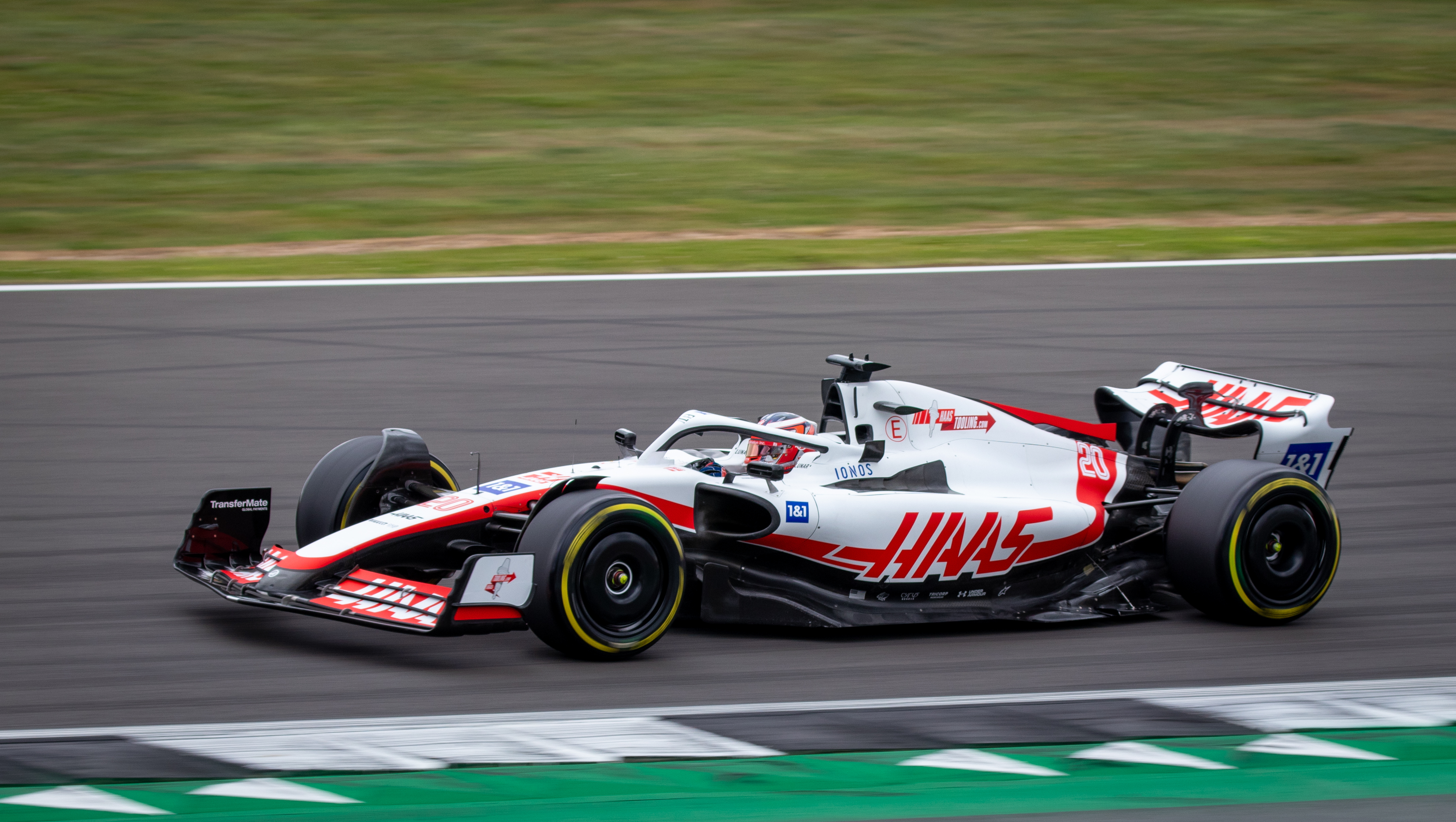
Magnussen driving the VF-22 at the British Grand Prix.

Following the Russian invasion of Ukraine, Haas removed the branding of Russian sponsor Uralkali from its cars and the colors of the Russian flag. On March 5, the team announced it had terminated its title sponsorship deal with Uralkali and its driver contract with Mazepin. Kevin Magnussen, who previously drove for the team from 2017 to 2020, was announced as his replacement. Haas's decision to focus on building the VF-22 throughout the 2021 season resulted in the car proving to be competitive among the mid-field teams. With Magnussen returning, Haas scored in the first two races of the season, with Magnussen finishing in 5th and 9th-place at the Bahrain and Saudi Arabian Grand Prix. Schumacher failed to score points in Bahrain and did not start in Saudi Arabia due to a crash in qualifying. The following races saw both Magnussen and Schumacher fail to score points and even finish the race as despite their high starting position after qualifying.

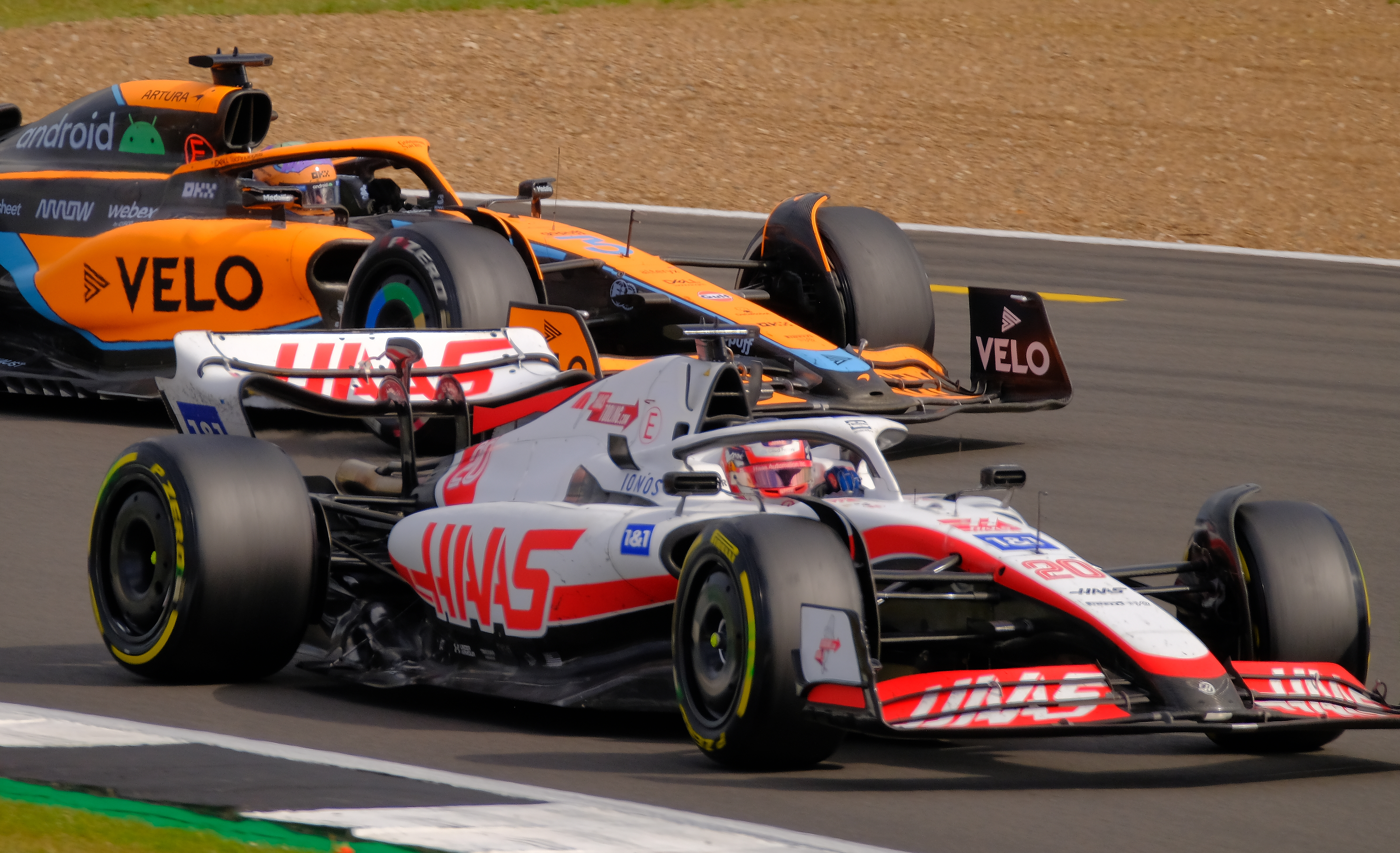
Magnussen battles Ricciardo of McLaren at Luffield corner at the 2022 British Grand Prix.

After a points drought, Haas took a double points finish at the 2022 British Grand Prix with Magnussen finishing 10th and Schumacher 8th; his first-ever point finish as a Formula One driver and the first double-point finish for Haas after three years. The momentum was maintained by Magnussen finishing 8th and Schumacher finishing 6th in the following race in Austrian Grand Prix. The team also took their maiden pole position at the 2022 São Paulo Grand Prix, with Magnussen out-qualifying the field in changing conditions to start on pole. Magnussen later retired after a collision with McLaren's Daniel Ricciardo at the start of the race. The team's two back-to-back double points finishes placed Haas eighth in the Constructors' Championship. Mick Schumacher departed from Haas at the end of the season.

=== 2023 season ===
Haas signed a title sponsorship deal with MoneyGram for the 2023 season onwards and competed as MoneyGram Haas F1 Team. Nico Hülkenberg's Formula One return was announced prior to the 2022 Abu Dhabi Grand Prix, partnering Magnussen for the 2023 season. Early 2023, Haas also announced that Pietro Fittipaldi remained as the team's official test and reserve driver for 2023 for a fifth consecutive season, participating in the development of the VF-23.

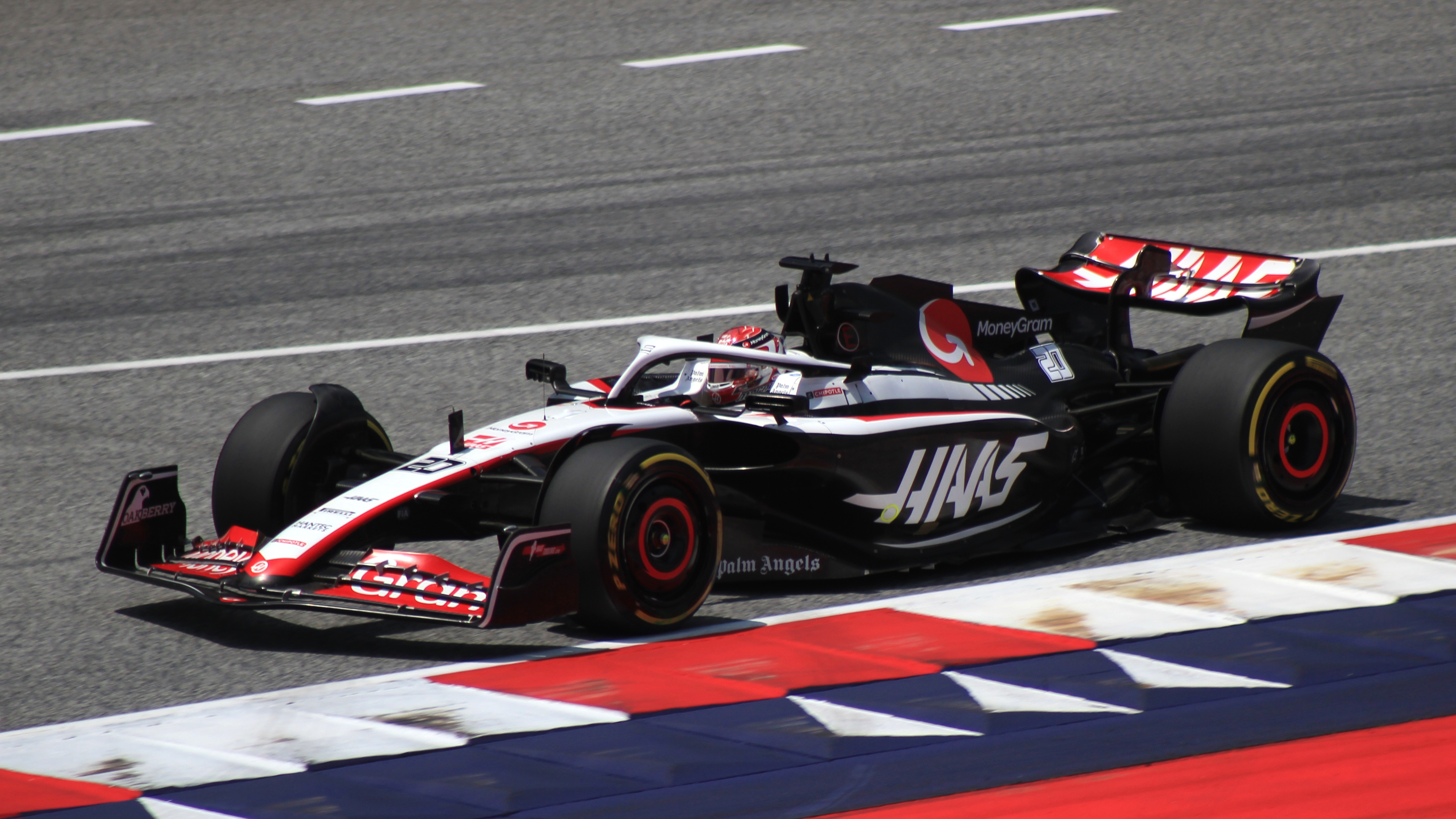
Magnussen driving the VF-23 at the 2023 Austrian Grand Prix.

At the Canadian Grand Prix, Hülkenberg achieved what would've been the team's best qualifying position of the season when he set the second fastest time during a wet qualifying session. After McLaren's Oscar Piastri crashed earlier in the session, bringing out the red flag, the rest of the grid were not able to improve on their qualifying times as the rain got heavier. However, Hülkenberg was handed a three-place grid penalty for a red flag infraction and would start the race in fifth position. Magnussen would start the race in 14th position.

Haas finished the season 10th in the Constructor's Championship with 12 points. While the team scored numerous top 10 qualifying positions, the VF-23's high tyre wear meant its drivers would slip down the order during races. The most notable example of this was Nico Hülkenberg's performance at the Canadian Grand Prix. Due to the VF-23's aggressive tyre wear, Hülkenberg had slipped down to 15th place by the chequered flag. Haas scored points just 5 times during the season with Hülkenberg's 7th-place finish at the Australian Grand Prix being the team's best finish of the season.

=== 2024 season ===
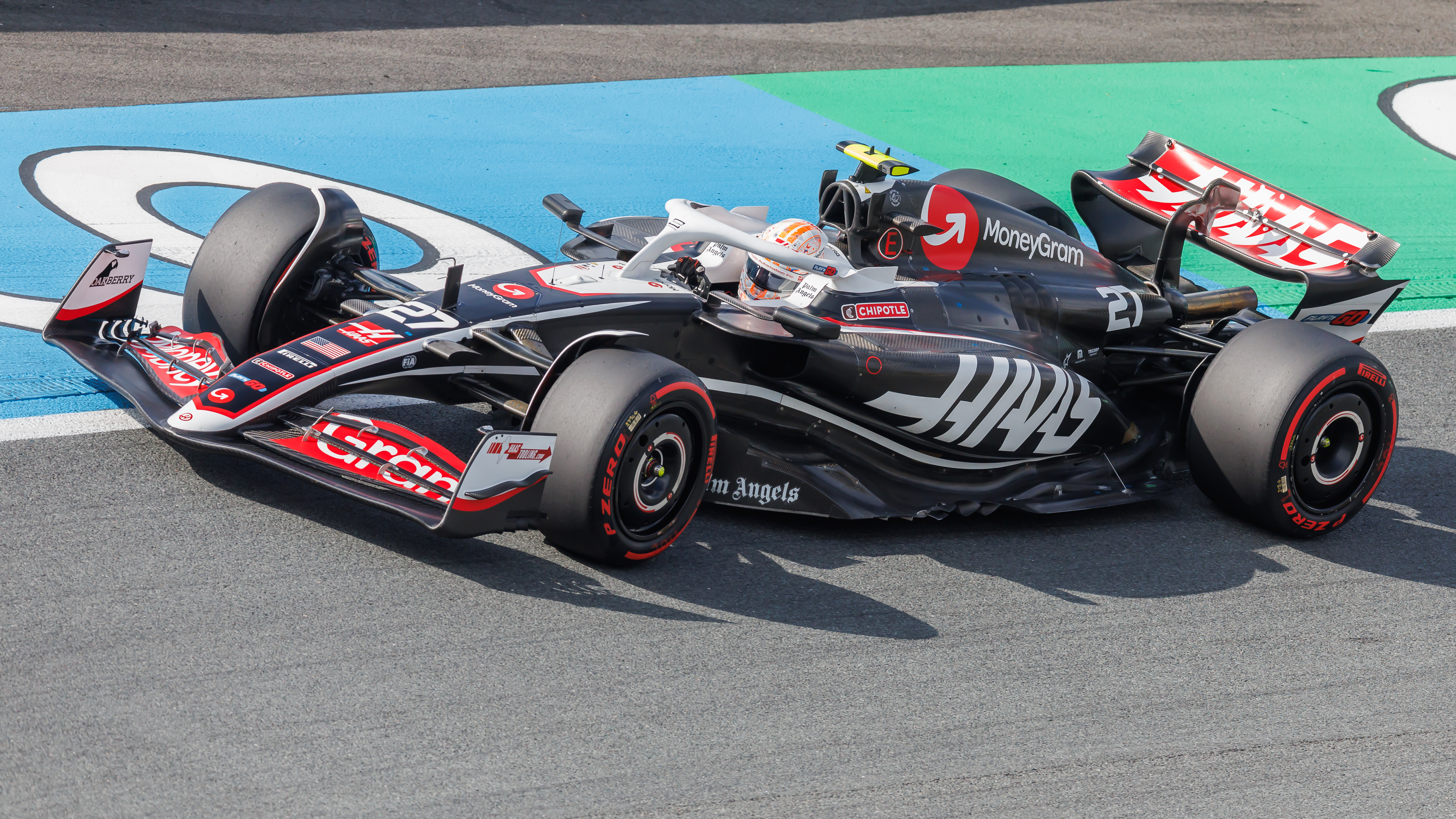
Hülkenberg driving the VF-24 at the 2024 Dutch Grand Prix.

In August 2023, Haas announced that its 2023 driver line-up of Hülkenberg and Magnussen would be retained for the 2024 season. Team principal Guenther Steiner's contract was not renewed, with the position being filled by engineer Ayao Komatsu on January 10. Technical director Simone Resta also departed.

In August 2024, it was reported that Haas has to reimburse US$9 million to former title sponsor Uralkali for the cancelled sponsorship contract two months prior. This resulted in Dutch bailiffs and police entering the Haas paddock during the Dutch Grand Prix weekend to valuate their assets for Uralkali to potentially seize should the company did not receive payment by August 26. On August 23, Gene Haas confirmed that the team has made the payment but it was complicated by the Russian sanctions. On August 26, Uralkali confirmed the receipt of the payment and Haas was allowed to leave for the Italian Grand Prix.

Magnussen received two penalty points for causing a collision at the Italian Grand Prix, taking his total to twelve points in twelve months and triggering a one race ban. Reserve driver Oliver Bearman replaced him for the Azerbaijan Grand Prix. Haas finished the season in seventh place, after double-podium for Alpine dropped them down from sixth. The team scored 58 points, the most they had scored since 2018.

=== 2025 season ===
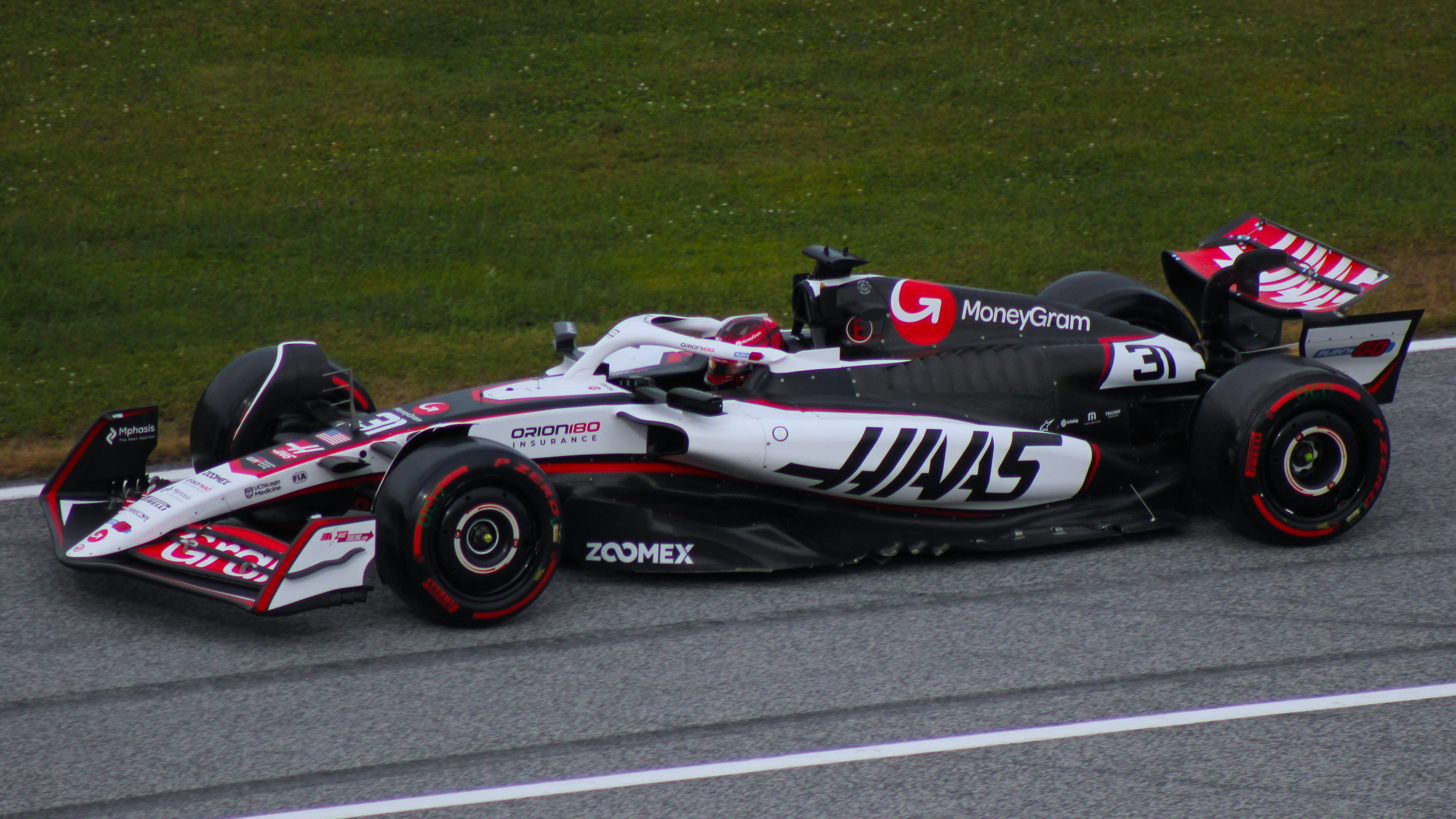
Esteban Ocon driving the VF-25 at the 2025 Austrian Grand Prix.

Hülkenberg and Magnussen departed the team after the 2024 season; the former re-joined Kick Sauber and was replaced by Formula 2 graduate and former reserve driver Oliver Bearman, the first time that Haas has taken on a rookie driver since the pairing of Nikita Mazepin and Mick Schumacher in 2021. The latter was replaced by Esteban Ocon, who departed Alpine after five seasons with Team Enstone. The season's opening race in Melbourne was an unwelcome surprise for Haas. In qualifying, Ocon was last of the classified drivers in P19 with teammate Bearman not being classified due to gearbox issues. In the race, despite rain and chaotic conditions, both drivers were again at the back of the pack finishing P13 and P14 as the last of the classified drivers.

At the second race in China, both drivers were able to score points with Ocon and Bearman crossing the line in P7 and P10 respectively. This marked the first points of the season for the team, the first points for Ocon with Haas and with a Ferrari power unit, and the first double points finish for Haas since Mexico. After the race, Scuderia Ferrari's Lewis Hamilton and Charles Leclerc, as well as Alpine's Pierre Gasly were disqualified. This promoted Ocon and Bearman to P5 and P8 respectively. At the twentieth race in Mexico, Bearman finished in P4, marking the team's second fourth-place finish since it entered the sport in 2016. Haas finished the season with 79 points. Despite scoring more points this season than in 2024, the team dropped from seventh to eighth place in the Constructors' Championship.

=== 2026 season ===
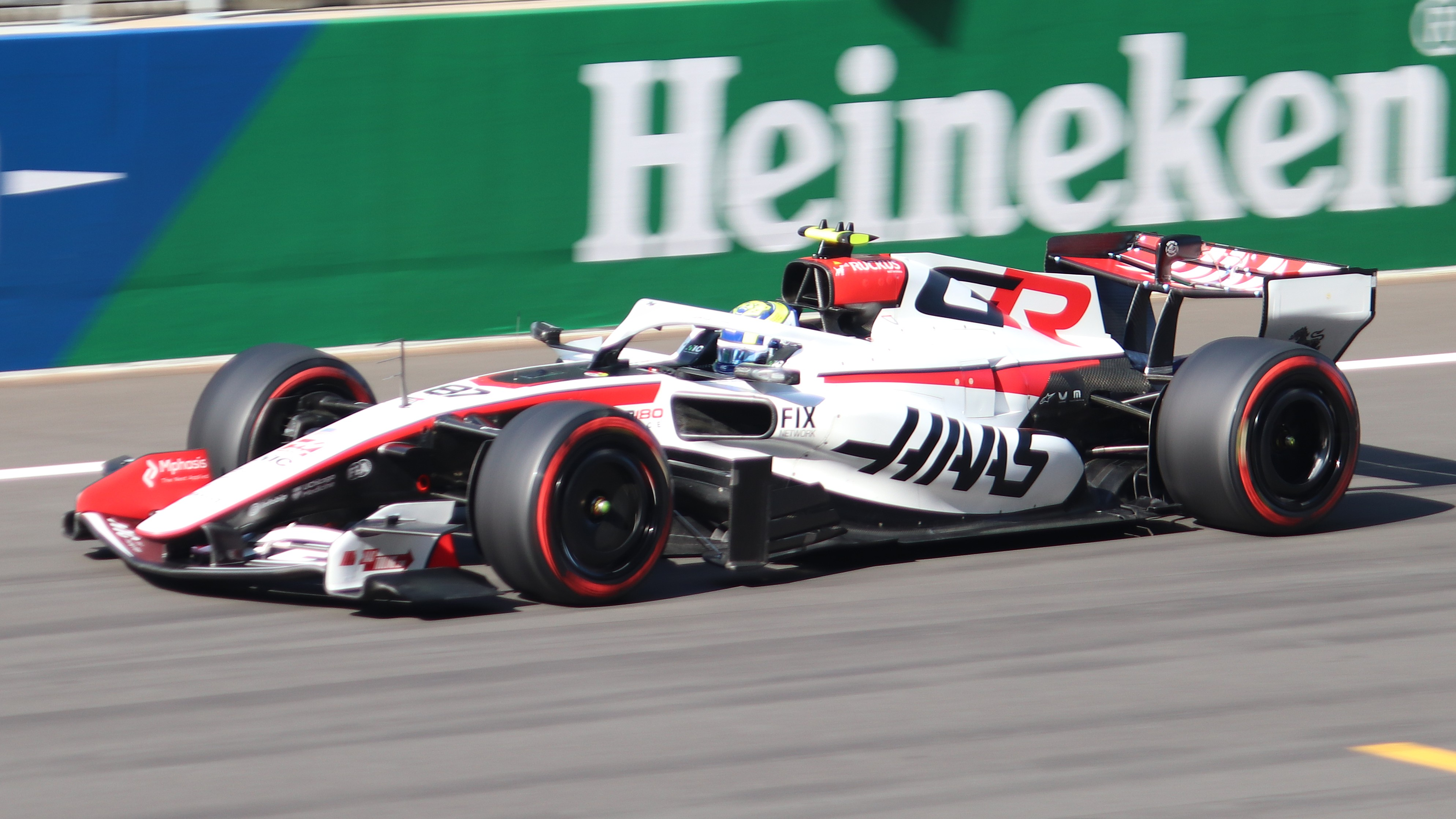
Oliver Bearman driving the VF-26 at the 2026 Chinese Grand Prix.

Haas retained Ocon and Bearman for the 2026 season, and signed former Alpine driver Jack Doohan as a reserve driver. In December 2025, Haas terminated their sponsorship agreement with MoneyGram to pursue a title sponsorship with technical partner Toyota Gazoo Racing to compete as TGR Haas F1 Team. The title sponsorship name will remain for the season despite TGR reverting its name to Gazoo Racing at the beginning of the year.

In October, it was announced that Ocon will depart the team at the end of the season. During the Mexico City Grand Prix, Ocon was abruptly replaced by test driver Ryo Hirakawa for the rest of the weekend from FP3 onwards following reports of a disagreement between Ocon and the team. Ocon was subsequently dropped by Haas for the rest of the season. While no official reason was given, team principal Ayao Komatsu said that the decision was for the best interest of the team and “the conversations that ultimately unfolded between the team and [Ocon] remain an internal matter”. BBC Sport later reported that both parties may become involved in litigation. Ocon's seat was filled by current Formula 2 championship leader Rafael Câmara, who was signed by Haas for 2027, for the São Paulo and Las Vegas Grands Prix.

=== 2027 season ===
Haas signed Formula 2 graduate Rafael Câmara for 2027. Bearman's future is yet to be confirmed.

== Relationship with other teams ==
=== Ferrari ===
Haas's approach of establishing a far-reaching partnership with Ferrari was met with a mixed response from the paddock. The constructor was applauded for pioneering a low-cost model that would allow new teams to enter the sport and be competitive, which had been of concern to the sport for some years. Conversely, Haas's approach was criticized by smaller privateer teams that had invested in their own infrastructure and expressed concerns about the close relationship between manufacturers and satellite constructors handing more political power to the sport's larger constructors.

In 2018, Haas once again came under fire after arriving at winter testing with a car that strongly resembled the Ferrari SF70H, Ferrari's 2017 car. McLaren and Force India both criticized the partnership between Ferrari and Haas. While no official grievances were filed at the time, McLaren CEO Zak Brown questioned the relationship. During rule discussions for the 2021 season in April 2019, concerns over Haas' approach of being a B-team were presented by Renault and McLaren. Ross Brawn, F1 managing director of motorsport at the time, stated that Haas' business model was "something we have to maintain for the future, for a small team to come in and be pretty respectable."

Haas depended on Ferrari for their reserve drivers. They have completed numerous practice sessions with Ferrari reserve drivers and Ferrari Driver Academy members such as Charles Leclerc, Antonio Giovinazzi, Callum Ilott and Robert Shwartzman. Former Ferrari junior Oliver Bearman, who joined the team in 2025, also participated in an FP1 session for Haas and substituted for Kevin Magnussen following his race ban and withdrawal due to illness at the 2024 Azerbaijan Grand Prix and the 2024 São Paulo Grand Prix, respectively. Additionally, during his tenure at the team, Mick Schumacher was still a Ferrari Driver Academy member and Ferrari reserve driver.

=== Toyota ===
In October 2024, Haas announced a technical partnership with Toyota. This would see the team integrate the services of Toyota Gazoo Racing (TGR), where TGR would provide design, technical and manufacturing services in exchange for Haas' technical expertise and commercial benefits. The agreement also marked the Toyota name returning to the sport for the first time in 15 years ever since the Toyota factory team withdrew at the end of 2009 season. In April 2025, as part of their technical partnership, Haas signed Toyota driver Ryō Hirakawa as their test driver for the 2025 season. In December 2025, Haas signed TGR as a title sponsor for the 2026 season onwards.

== Complete Formula One results ==
Key

Key
Colour	Result
Gold	Winner
Silver	Second place
Bronze	Third place
Green	Other points position
Blue	Other classified position
Blue	Not classified, finished (NC)
Purple	Not classified, retired (Ret)
Red	Did not qualify (DNQ)
Black	Disqualified (DSQ)
White	Did not start (DNS)
White	Race cancelled (C)
Blank	Did not practice (DNP)
Blank	Excluded (EX)
Blank	Did not arrive (DNA)
Blank	Withdrawn (WD)
Blank	Did not enter (empty cell)
Annotation	Meaning
P	Pole position
F	Fastest lap
Superscript number	Points-scoring position in sprint

Year	Chassis	Engine	Tyres	Drivers	1	2	3	4	5	6	7	8	9	10	11	12	13	14	15	16	17	18	19	20	21	22	23	24	Points	WCC
2016	VF-16	Ferrari 061; 1.6 V6 t	P		AUS	BHR	CHN	RUS	ESP	MON	CAN	EUR	AUT	GBR	HUN	GER	BEL	ITA	SIN	MAL	JPN	USA	MEX	BRA	ABU				29	8th
2016	VF-16	Ferrari 061; 1.6 V6 t	P	(France) Romain Grosjean	6	5	19	8	Ret	13	14	13	7	Ret	14	13	13	11	DNS	Ret	11	10	20	DNS	11				29	8th
2016	VF-16	Ferrari 061; 1.6 V6 t	P	(Mexico) Esteban Gutiérrez	Ret	Ret	14	17	11	11	13	16	11	16	13	11	12	13	11	Ret	20	Ret	19	Ret	12				29	8th
2017	VF-17	Ferrari 062; 1.6 V6 t	P		AUS	CHN	BHR	RUS	ESP	MON	CAN	AZE	AUT	GBR	HUN	BEL	ITA	SIN	MAL	JPN	USA	MEX	BRA	ABU					47	8th
2017	VF-17	Ferrari 062; 1.6 V6 t	P	(France) Romain Grosjean	Ret	11	8	Ret	10	8	10	13	6	13	Ret	7	15	9	13	9	14	15	15	11					47	8th
2017	VF-17	Ferrari 062; 1.6 V6 t	P	(Denmark) Kevin Magnussen	Ret	8	Ret	13	14	10	12	7	Ret	12	13	15	11	Ret	12	8	16	8	Ret	13					47	8th
2018	VF-18	Ferrari 062 EVO; 1.6 V6 t	P		AUS	BHR	CHN	AZE	ESP	MON	CAN	FRA	AUT	GBR	GER	HUN	BEL	ITA	SIN	RUS	JPN	USA	MEX	BRA	ABU				93	5th
2018	VF-18	Ferrari 062 EVO; 1.6 V6 t	P	(France) Romain Grosjean	Ret	13	17	Ret	Ret	15	12	11	4	Ret	6	10	7	DSQ	15	11	8	Ret	16	8	9				93	5th
2018	VF-18	Ferrari 062 EVO; 1.6 V6 t	P	(Denmark) Kevin Magnussen	Ret	5	10	13	6	13	13	6	5	9	11	7	8	16	18^{F}	8	Ret	DSQ	15	9	10				93	5th
2019	VF-19	Ferrari 064; 1.6 V6 t	P		AUS	BHR	CHN	AZE	ESP	MON	CAN	FRA	AUT	GBR	GER	HUN	BEL	ITA	SIN	RUS	JPN	MEX	USA	BRA	ABU				28	9th
2019	VF-19	Ferrari 064; 1.6 V6 t	P	(France) Romain Grosjean	Ret	Ret	11	Ret	10	10	14	Ret	16	Ret	7	Ret	13	16	11	Ret	13	17	15	13	15				28	9th
2019	VF-19	Ferrari 064; 1.6 V6 t	P	(Denmark) Kevin Magnussen	6	13	13	13	7	14	17	17	19	Ret	8	13	12	Ret	17^{F}	9	15	15	18^{†}	11	14				28	9th
2020	VF-20	Ferrari 065; 1.6 V6 t	P		AUT	STY	HUN	GBR	70A	ESP	BEL	ITA	TUS	RUS	EIF	POR	EMI	TUR	BHR	SKH	ABU								3	9th
2020	VF-20	Ferrari 065; 1.6 V6 t	P	(France) Romain Grosjean	Ret	13	16	16	16	19	15	12	12	17	9	17	14	Ret	Ret										3	9th
2020	VF-20	Ferrari 065; 1.6 V6 t	P	(Denmark) Kevin Magnussen	Ret	12	10	Ret	Ret	15	17	Ret	Ret	12	13	16	Ret	17†	17	15	18								3	9th
2020	VF-20	Ferrari 065; 1.6 V6 t	P	(Brazil) Pietro Fittipaldi																17	19								3	9th
2021	VF-21	Ferrari 065/6; 1.6 V6 t	P		BHR	EMI	POR	ESP	MON	AZE	FRA	STY	AUT	GBR	HUN	BEL	NED	ITA	RUS	TUR	USA	MXC	SAP	QAT	SAU	ABU			0	10th
2021	VF-21	Ferrari 065/6; 1.6 V6 t	P	(Russian Automobile Federation) Nikita Mazepin (Note: Nikita Mazepin is Russian, but he competed as a neutral competitor using the designation RAF (Russian Automobile Federation), as the Court of Arbitration for Sport upheld a ban on Russia competing at World Championships. The ban was implemented by the World Anti-Doping Agency in response to state-sponsored doping program of Russian athletes.)	Ret	17	19	19	17	14	20	18	19	17	Ret	17	Ret	Ret	18	20	17	18	17	18	Ret	WD			0	10th
2021	VF-21	Ferrari 065/6; 1.6 V6 t	P	(Germany) Mick Schumacher	16	16	17	18	18	13	19	16	18	18	12	16	18	15	Ret	19	16	Ret	18	16	Ret	14			0	10th
2022	VF-22	Ferrari 066/7; 1.6 V6 t	P		BHR	SAU	AUS	EMI	MIA	ESP	MON	AZE	CAN	GBR	AUT	FRA	HUN	BEL	NED	ITA	SIN	JPN	USA	MXC	SAP	ABU			37	8th
2022	VF-22	Ferrari 066/7; 1.6 V6 t	P	(Denmark) Kevin Magnussen	5	9	14	9^{8}	16†	17	Ret	Ret	17	10	8^{7}	Ret	16	16	15	16	12	14	9	17	Ret^{P 8}	17			37	8th
2022	VF-22	Ferrari 066/7; 1.6 V6 t	P	(Germany) Mick Schumacher	11	WD	13	17	15	14	Ret	14	Ret	8	6	15	14	17	13	12	13	17	15	16	13	16			37	8th
2023	VF-23	Ferrari 066/10 1.6 V6 t	P		BHR	SAU	AUS	AZE	MIA	MON	ESP	CAN	AUT	GBR	HUN	BEL	NED	ITA	SIN	JPN	QAT	USA	MXC	SAP	LVG	ABU			12	10th
2023	VF-23	Ferrari 066/10 1.6 V6 t	P	(Germany) Nico Hülkenberg	15	12	7	17	15	17	15	15	Ret^{6}	13	14	18	12	17	13	14	16	11	13	12	19†	15			12	10th
2023	VF-23	Ferrari 066/10 1.6 V6 t	P	(Denmark) Kevin Magnussen	13	10	17†	13	10	19†	18	17	18	Ret	17	15	16	18	10	15	14	14	Ret	Ret	13	20			12	10th
2024	VF-24	Ferrari 066/10 1.6 V6 t	P		BHR	SAU	AUS	JPN	CHN	MIA	EMI	MON	CAN	ESP	AUT	GBR	HUN	BEL	NED	ITA	AZE	SIN	USA	MXC	SAP	LVG	QAT	ABU	58	7th
2024	VF-24	Ferrari 066/10 1.6 V6 t	P	(Germany) Nico Hülkenberg	16	10	9	11	10	11^{7}	11	Ret	11	11	6	6	13	18	11	17	11	9	8^{8}	9	DSQ	8	Ret^{7}	8	58	7th
2024	VF-24	Ferrari 066/10 1.6 V6 t	P	(Denmark) Kevin Magnussen	12	12	10	13	16	19	12	Ret	12	17	8	12	15	14	18	10		19†	11^{7}	7	WD	12	9	16^{F}	58	7th
2024	VF-24	Ferrari 066/10 1.6 V6 t	P	(United Kingdom) Oliver Bearman																	10				12				58	7th
2025	VF-25	Ferrari 066/12 1.6 V6 t	P		AUS	CHN	JPN	BHR	SAU	MIA	EMI	MON	ESP	CAN	AUT	GBR	BEL	HUN	NED	ITA	AZE	SIN	USA	MXC	SAP	LVG	QAT	ABU	79	8th
2025	VF-25	Ferrari 066/12 1.6 V6 t	P	(United Kingdom) Oliver Bearman	14	8	10	10	13	Ret	17	12	17	11	11	11	11^{7}	Ret	6	12	12	9	9	4	6	10	Ret	12	79	8th
2025	VF-25	Ferrari 066/12 1.6 V6 t	P	(France) Esteban Ocon	13	5	18	8	14	12	Ret	7	16	9	10	13	15^{5}	16	10	15	14	18	15	9	12	9	15	7	79	8th
2026	VF-26	Ferrari 1.6 V6 t	P		AUS	CHN	JPN	MIA	CAN	MON	BCN	AUT	GBR	BEL	HUN	NED	ITA	ESP	AZE	BHR	SIN	USA	MXC	SAP	LVG	QAT	ABU		31*	7th*
2026	VF-26	Ferrari 1.6 V6 t	P	(United Kingdom) Oliver Bearman	7	5^{8}	Ret	11	10	Ret	17†	14	12	14	19	Ret	15	16	9	14	12^{6}	Ret	Ret	17	13				31*	7th*
2026	VF-26	Ferrari 1.6 V6 t	P	(France) Esteban Ocon	11	14	10	13	14	9	13	16	13	17	16	Ret	16	11	8	15	13	14	WD						31*	7th*
2026	VF-26	Ferrari 1.6 V6 t	P	(Japan) Ryo Hirakawa																			10						31*	7th*
2026	VF-26	Ferrari 1.6 V6 t	P	(Brazil) Rafael Câmara																				20	16				31*	7th*

Notes

- * – Season still in progress.
- ^{†} – The driver did not finish the Grand Prix but was classified, as he completed over 90% of the race distance.

== Esports ==
Year	Name	Car	Engine	Tyres	No.	Drivers	Points	WCC
2018	(United States) Haas F1 Esports Team	VF-18	Ferrari 062 EVO 1.6 V6 t	P	98. 69. 63.	(Czech Republic) Martin Stefanko (Czech Republic) Michal Smidl (United Kingdom) Tom Parker	27	8th
2019	(United States) Haas F1 Team Esports	VF-19	Ferrari 064 1.6 V6 t	P	38. N.A. 98.	(Netherlands) Floris Wijers (Germany) Jan Fehler (Czech Republic) Martin Stefanko	8	10th
2020	(United States) Haas F1 Esports	VF-20	Ferrari 065 1.6 V6 t	P	38. 2. 30.	(Germany) Simon Weiganf (Germany) Cedric Thomé (Netherlands) Floris Weijers	39	9th
2021	(United States) Uralkali Haas F1 Esports Team	VF-21	Ferrari 065/6 1.6 V6 t	P	2. 48. N.A.	(Germany) Cedric Thomé (Netherlands) Matthijs van Erven (France) Samuel Libeert	10	10th
2022	(United States) Haas F1 Team Esports	VF-22	Ferrari 066/7 1.6 V6 t	P	48. 39. 84.	(Netherlands) Matthijs van Erven (Netherlands) Thomas Ronhaar (Poland) Piotr Stachulec	177	3rd
2023-24	(United States) MoneyGram Haas F1 Team Esports	VF-23	Ferrari 066/10 1.6 V6 t	P	95. 41. 37.	(Turkey) Ulaş Özyıldrım (United Kingdom) Alfie Butcher (Hungary) Bence Szabó-Kónyi	116	5th
2025	(United States) MoneyGram Haas F1 Sim Racing Team	VF-24	Ferrari 066/10 1.6 V6 t	P	36. 34. 79.	(Netherlands) Joris Croezen (Hungary) Tamás Gál (United Kingdom) Shanaka Clay	3	10th
2026	(United States) TGR Haas F1 Sim Racing Team	VF-26	Ferrari 067/6 1.6 V6 t	P	34. 36. 71.	(Hungary) Tamás Gál (Netherlands) Joris Croezen (Hungary) Gábor Csontos	44	9th

=== Complete F1 Esports Series results ===
Year	Chassis	Drivers	1	2	3	4	5	6	7	8	9	10	11	12	Points	WCC
2018	Haas VF-18		AUS	CHN	AZE	FRA	GBR	BEL	GER	SIN	USA	ABU			27	8th
2018	Haas VF-18	(Czech Republic) Martin Stefanko	12	10	18	16	11	11	15	5	16	7			27	8th
2018	Haas VF-18	(Czech Republic) Michal Smidl	14	17	17				13	8	17	12			27	8th
2018	Haas VF-18	(United Kingdom) Tom Parker				18	16	17							27	8th
2019	Haas VF-19		BHR	CHN	AZE	CAN	RBR	GBR	GER	BEL	ITA	JPN	USA	BRA	8	10th
2019	Haas VF-19	(Netherlands) Floris Wijers	9	7	18	17	19	15	15	13	12	19	16	16	8	10th
2019	Haas VF-19	(Germany) Jan Fehler	20	17	Ret	15	13		16	19	18	17	18	14	8	10th
2019	Haas VF-19	(Czech Republic) Martin Stefanko						12							8	10th
2020	Haas VF-20		BHR	VIE	CHN	NED	CAN	RBR	GBR	BEL	ITA	JPN	MEX	BRA	39	9th
2020	Haas VF-20	(Germany) Simon Weigang	18	16	14	17	Ret	6	4	6	20	18	7	12	39	9th
2020	Haas VF-20	(Germany) Cedric Thomé	17	18	8	19	18	18		17	14	17	14	10	39	9th
2020	Haas VF-20	(Netherlands) Floris Wijers							14						39	9th
2021	Haas VF-21		BHR	CHN	RBR	GBR	ITA	BEL	POR	NED	USA	EMI	MEX	BRA	10	10th
2021	Haas VF-21	(Germany) Cedric Thomé	16	15	18	14	18	13	18	17	13	15	19	9	10	10th
2021	Haas VF-21	(Netherlands) Matthijs van Erven	15	13	11	12	13	15	15	15	17	16	20	6	10	10th
2021	Haas VF-21	(France) Samuel Libeert													10	10th
2022	Haas VF-22		BHR	EMI	GBR	RBR	BEL	NED	ITA	MEX	USA	JPN	BRA	UAE	177	3rd
2022	Haas VF-22	(Netherlands) Matthijs van Erven		6		19	19		19			8			177	3rd
2022	Haas VF-22	(Netherlands) Thomas Ronhaar	Ret	4	2	1	7	9	1	3	2	2	6	2	177	3rd
2022	Haas VF-22	(Poland) Piotr Strachulec	17		11			20		17	17	9	Ret	18	177	3rd
2023–24	Haas VF-23		BHR	JED	RBR	GBR	BEL	NED	USA	MEX	BRA	LVG	QAT	UAE	116	5th
2023–24	Haas VF-23	(Turkey) Ulaş Özyıldrım	14	11	13	17	16	19	11	17	12	5	11	17	116	5th
2023–24	Haas VF-23	(United Kingdom) Alfie Butcher	9	Ret	1	18	Ret	4	5	4	2	10	12	1	116	5th
2023–24	Haas VF-23	(Hungary) Bence Szabó-Kónyi													116	5th
2025	Haas VF-24		AUS	CHN	BHR	SAU	GBR	BEL	NED	USA	MXC	SAP	QAT	ABU	3	10th
2025	Haas VF-24	(Netherlands) Joris Croezen	12	14	17	11	20	19		17	11	13			3	10th
2025	Haas VF-24	(Hungary) Tamás Gál	14	17	19	10	18	14	11	19	13	18	18	14	3	10th
2025	Haas VF-24	(United Kingdom) Shanaka Clay							19				9	17	3	10th
2026	Haas VF-26		CHN	JPN	BHR	SAU	CAT	GBR	BEL	NED	USA	MXC	SAP	ABU	44	9th
2026	Haas VF-26	(Hungary) Tamás Gál	17	14	14	8	12	15	11	15		16	15	11	44	9th
2026	Haas VF-26	(Netherlands) Joris Croezen	5	8	6	9	15	8	14	12	12	11	8	7	44	9th
2026	Haas VF-26	(Hungary) Gábor Csontos									17				44	9th

== Driver development program ==
Since the team's foundation, multiple development drivers have been affiliated with Haas. These include:

Driver	Years	Series competed	F1 experience
(United States) Santino Ferrucci	2016–2018	GP3 Series (2016–2017); FIA Formula 2 Championship (2017–2018)	—N/a
(India) Arjun Maini	2017–2018	GP3 Series (2017); FIA Formula 2 Championship (2018)	—N/a
(Switzerland) Louis Delétraz	2018–2020	FIA Formula 2 Championship (2018–2020); GT World Challenge Europe Endurance Cup (2020)	—N/a
(Brazil) Pietro Fittipaldi	2019–2025	Deutsche Tourenwagen Masters (2019); F3 Asian Championship (2019–2020); European Le Mans Series (2021–2022, 2025); Stock Car Brasil (2021–2022); IndyCar Series (2021, 2024); FIA World Endurance Championship (2023); IMSA SportsCar Championship (2023–2025)	Haas (2020)
(United States) Chloe Chambers	2024	F1 Academy (2024); Porsche Sprint Challenge North America (2024); IMSA Ford Mustang Challenge (2024)	—N/a
(United States) Courtney Crone	2025	F1 Academy (2025)	—N/a
(United States) Kaylee Countryman	2026	F1 Academy (2026)	—N/a

== See also ==
- Stewart-Haas Racing
- Haas Automation
- Haas Factory Team
