= Rob Taylor (engineer) =

British engineer (born 1959)

- Born: Robert Taylor; 23 April 1959 (age 67); Deddington, England
- Occupation: Engineer
- Years active: 1989–2024
- Known for: Formula One Engineer

Robert Taylor (born 23 April 1959) is a retired British Formula One and motorsport engineer. He is best known for holding senior engineering positions at Haas F1 Team, Marussia F1, Red Bull Racing, Jaguar Racing and Arrows International.

== Career ==
Taylor studied mechanical engineering before beginning his career in the automotive and aerospace sectors, working for Rolls-Royce and later Cosworth, where he gained experience in powertrain and mechanical design. He moved into Formula One in 1989 with Benetton Formula as a suspension design engineer, contributing to car design and development during the team’s rise in competitiveness in the early 1990s. Taylor subsequently joined Scuderia Ferrari at its Design and Development base in Shalford, Surrey, where he worked as a design engineer responsible for suspension systems and gearbox design.

Taylor later followed a number of Ferrari Design and Development staff to Arrows International, initially serving as a senior design engineer before being promoted to Chief Designer in 1998, overseeing chassis design coordination and engineering processes. When the Arrows team folded, Taylor joined Jaguar Racing as Head of Vehicle Design, continuing to focus on the mechanical architecture of the car. He remained in this position following the team’s transformation into Red Bull Racing, heading the chassis design group until his departure at the start of 2006. He then reunited with former Ferrari and Arrows colleague Mike Coughlan at McLaren Racing as Senior Design Team Leader, contributing to the development of the championship-winning McLaren MP4-23.

Taylor joined Marussia F1 in 2011 as Deputy Chief Designer, where he played a central role in establishing the team’s in-house design capability during its transition from a customer-car model run by Wirth Research to a fully independent constructor. In 2015 he became Chief Designer of the newly established Haas F1 Team, leading the design of the American squad’s first generation of Formula One cars and helping shape its technical structure ahead of its 2016 debut. He remained Chief Designer until the end of 2020, when he transitioned to the role of Assistant Chief Engineer. Taylor departed the team in 2024.
