= 2022 British Grand Prix =

Tenth round of the 2022 F1 season

Race 10 of 22 in the 2022 Formula One World Championship
| ← Previous race | Next race → |
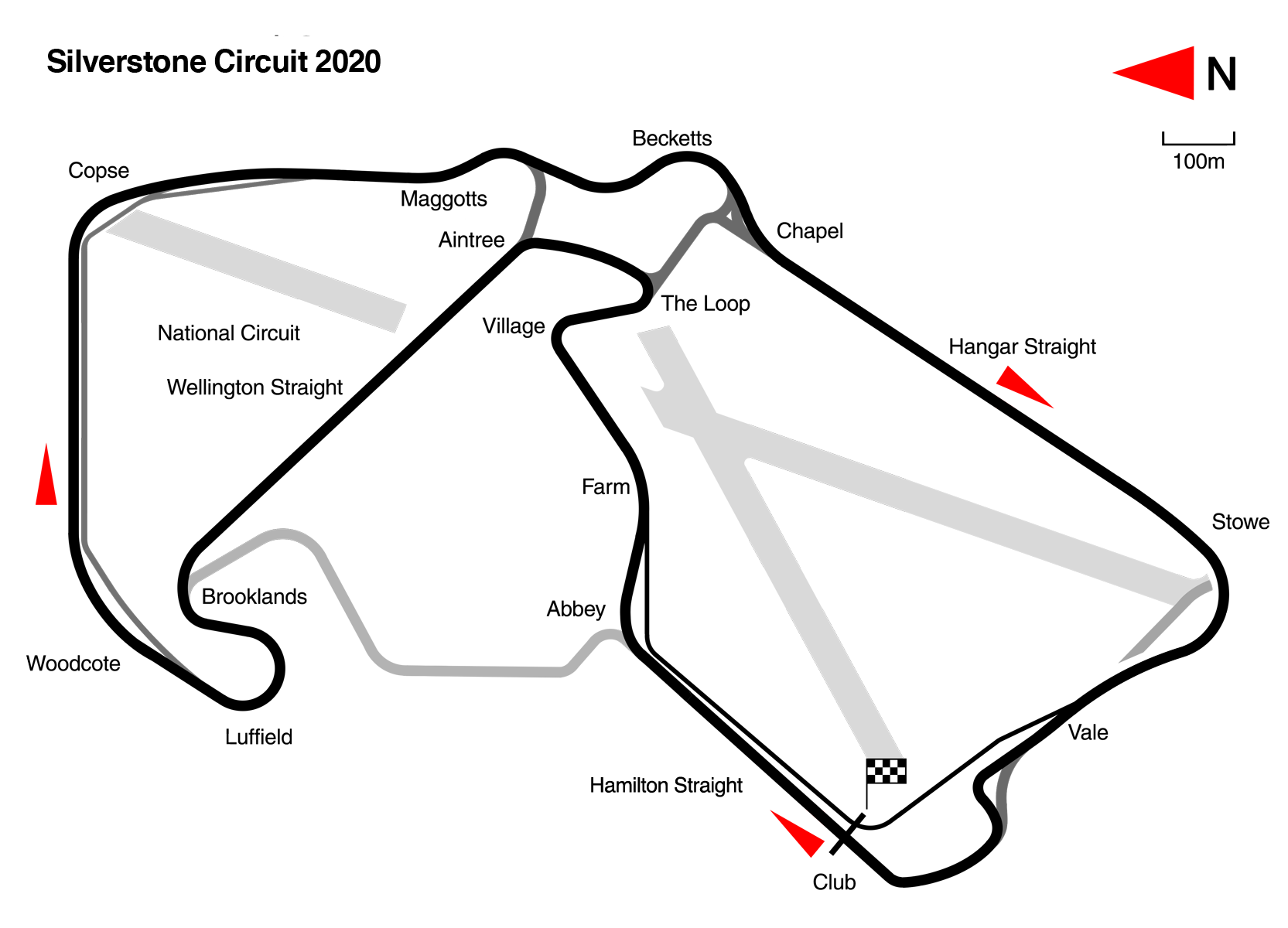
- Layout of the Silverstone Circuit

Race details
- Date: 3 July 2022
- Official name: Formula 1 Lenovo British Grand Prix 2022
- Location: Silverstone Circuit; Silverstone, United Kingdom
- Course: Permanent racing facility
- Course length: 5.891 km (3.660 miles)
- Distance: 52 laps, 306.198 km (190.263 miles)
- Weather: Partly cloudy
- Attendance: 401,000

Pole position
| Driver | (Spain) Carlos Sainz Jr. | Ferrari |
- Time: 1:40.983

Fastest lap
| Driver | (United Kingdom) Lewis Hamilton | Mercedes |
- Time: 1:30.510 on lap 52

Podium
| First | (Spain) Carlos Sainz Jr. | Ferrari |
| Second | (Mexico) Sergio Pérez | Red Bull Racing-RBPT |
| Third | (United Kingdom) Lewis Hamilton | Mercedes |

The 2022 British Grand Prix (officially known as the Formula 1 Lenovo British Grand Prix 2022) was a Formula One motor race held on 3 July 2022 at the Silverstone Circuit in Northamptonshire, England.

Carlos Sainz Jr. took both his first pole position and Formula One victory, ahead of Sergio Pérez and Lewis Hamilton. Sainz became the first Spanish driver to win a race since Fernando Alonso won the 2013 Spanish Grand Prix. Championship leader Max Verstappen finished seventh after acquiring car damage early in the race. A multi-car crash occurred on the opening lap, in which Zhou Guanyu's car flipped over the tyre wall marking the circuit boundaries.

Following this result, Pérez was able to reduce the gap to Verstappen in the World Drivers' Championship to 34 points, distancing third-placed driver Charles Leclerc by a further nine points. Sainz's victory – coupled with George Russell's first-lap retirement – moved him to fourth with 127 points, trailing his teammate Leclerc by only eleven points. In the World Constructors' Championship, Ferrari reduced the points deficit to Red Bull to 63 points.

== Background ==
The event was held across the weekend of the 1–3 July. It was the tenth round of the 2022 Formula One World Championship. It was the 73rd time the British Grand Prix has been held and the race took place two weeks after the Canadian Grand Prix and preceded the Austrian Grand Prix.

=== Championship standings before the race ===
Following the Canadian Grand Prix, Max Verstappen led the Drivers' Championship by 46 points from teammate Sergio Pérez, with Charles Leclerc third, a further three points behind. Red Bull Racing led the Constructors' Championship, leading Ferrari by 74 points. Mercedes were in third place, trailing Ferrari by 40 points.

=== Entrants ===
The drivers and teams were the same as the season entry list with no additional stand-in drivers for the race. It was the 150th race start for Carlos Sainz Jr.

=== Tyre choices ===
Tyre supplier Pirelli brought the C1, C2, and C3 tyre compounds (designated hard, medium, and soft, respectively) for teams to use at the event.

== Practice ==
The weekend had three practice sessions, each lasting one hour. The first session took place on 1 July and started at 13:00 local time (UTC+01:00). There was rain before and during the session, with teams deciding not to go on track as much as they normally would have, due to dry weather predicted for the rest of the weekend. Towards the end of the session the weather cleared and the track began to dry. A number of drivers attempted to drive the track on slick tyres, including Lance Stroll, who spun at turn 9, getting stuck in the gravel. The session was red flagged and not resumed. Valtteri Bottas was fastest, with Lewis Hamilton and Carlos Sainz Jr. in second and third respectively.

The second session took place on 1 July and started at 16:00 local time. The session was conducted in dry conditions. No major incidents meant the whole session was under green flag conditions. The Aston Martin of Sebastian Vettel picked up some floor damage in the session, but he made it back to the pits. Sainz was fastest, with Hamilton and Lando Norris in second and third respectively.

The third practice session started at 12:00 local time on 2 July. There were no major incidents and so the whole session was under green flag conditions. Max Verstappen was fastest, with Sergio Pérez and Charles Leclerc in second and third respectively.

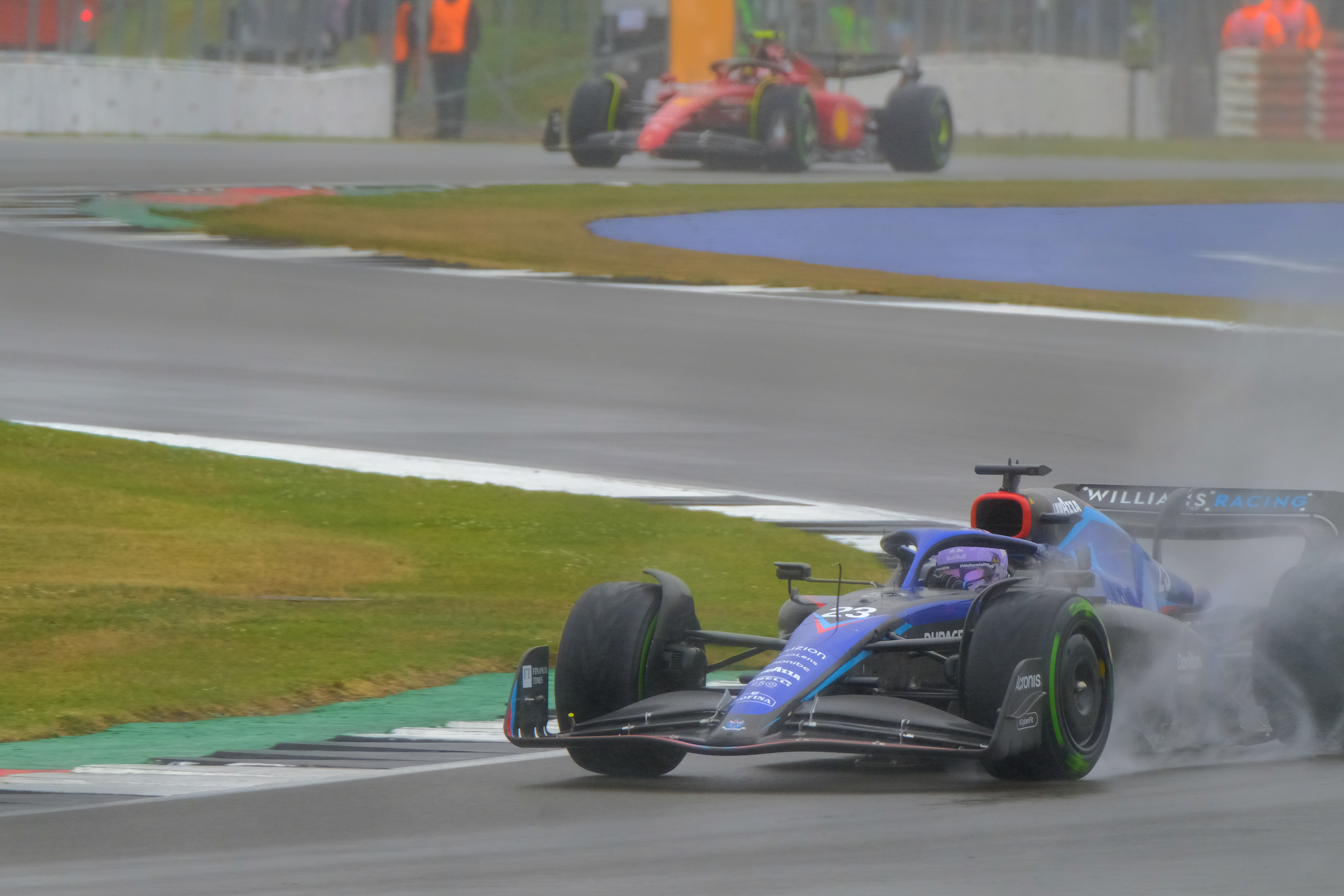
Alexander Albon of Williams Racing during the wet qualifying session. Albon was airlifted to Coventry Hospital the next day after a serious crash on the first lap of the race, but was later released without injury.

== Qualifying ==
Qualifying started at 15:00 local time on 2 July, and lasted for one hour. The session was held in wet conditions and ended with Carlos Sainz Jr. claiming his maiden pole position. Max Verstappen's final qualifying attempt was interrupted by yellow flags, after Charles Leclerc spun.

=== Qualifying classification ===
| Pos. | No. | Driver | Constructor | Qualifying times | | | Final grid |
| Pos. | No. | Driver | Constructor | Q1 | Q2 | Q3 | Final grid |
|---|---|---|---|---|---|---|---|
| 1 | 55 | (Spain) Carlos Sainz Jr. | Ferrari | 1:40.190 | 1:41.602 | 1:40.983 | 1 |
| 2 | 1 | (Netherlands) Max Verstappen | Red Bull Racing-RBPT | 1:39.129 | 1:40.655 | 1:41.055 | 2 |
| 3 | 16 | (Monaco) Charles Leclerc | Ferrari | 1:39.846 | 1:41.247 | 1:41.298 | 3 |
| 4 | 11 | (Mexico) Sergio Pérez | Red Bull Racing-RBPT | 1:40.521 | 1:42.513 | 1:41.616 | 4 |
| 5 | 44 | (United Kingdom) Lewis Hamilton | Mercedes | 1:40.428 | 1:41.062 | 1:41.995 | 5 |
| 6 | 4 | (United Kingdom) Lando Norris | McLaren-Mercedes | 1:41.515 | 1:41.821 | 1:42.084 | 6 |
| 7 | 14 | (Spain) Fernando Alonso | Alpine-Renault | 1:41.598 | 1:42.209 | 1:42.116 | 7 |
| 8 | 63 | (United Kingdom) George Russell | Mercedes | 1:40.028 | 1:41.725 | 1:42.161 | 8 |
| 9 | 24 | (China) Zhou Guanyu | Alfa Romeo-Ferrari | 1:40.791 | 1:42.640 | 1:42.719 | 9 |
| 10 | 6 | (Canada) Nicholas Latifi | Williams-Mercedes | 1:41.998 | 1:43.273 | 2:03.095 | 10 |
| 11 | 10 | (France) Pierre Gasly | AlphaTauri-RBPT | 1:41.680 | 1:43.702 | N/A | 11 |
| 12 | 77 | (Finland) Valtteri Bottas | Alfa Romeo-Ferrari | 1:41.396 | 1:44.232 | N/A | 12 |
| 13 | 22 | (Japan) Yuki Tsunoda | AlphaTauri-RBPT | 1:41.893 | 1:44.311 | N/A | 13 |
| 14 | 3 | (Australia) Daniel Ricciardo | McLaren-Mercedes | 1:41.933 | 1:44.355 | N/A | 14 |
| 15 | 31 | (France) Esteban Ocon | Alpine-Renault | 1:41.730 | 1:45.190 | N/A | 15 |
| 16 | 23 | (Thailand) Alexander Albon | Williams-Mercedes | 1:42.078 | N/A | N/A | 16 |
| 17 | 20 | (Denmark) Kevin Magnussen | Haas-Ferrari | 1:42.159 | N/A | N/A | 17 |
| 18 | 5 | (Germany) Sebastian Vettel | Aston Martin Aramco-Mercedes | 1:42.666 | N/A | N/A | 18 |
| 19 | 47 | (Germany) Mick Schumacher | Haas-Ferrari | 1:42.708 | N/A | N/A | 19 |
| 20 | 18 | (Canada) Lance Stroll | Aston Martin Aramco-Mercedes | 1:43.430 | N/A | N/A | 20 |
107% time: 1:46.068

== Race ==
=== Race report ===
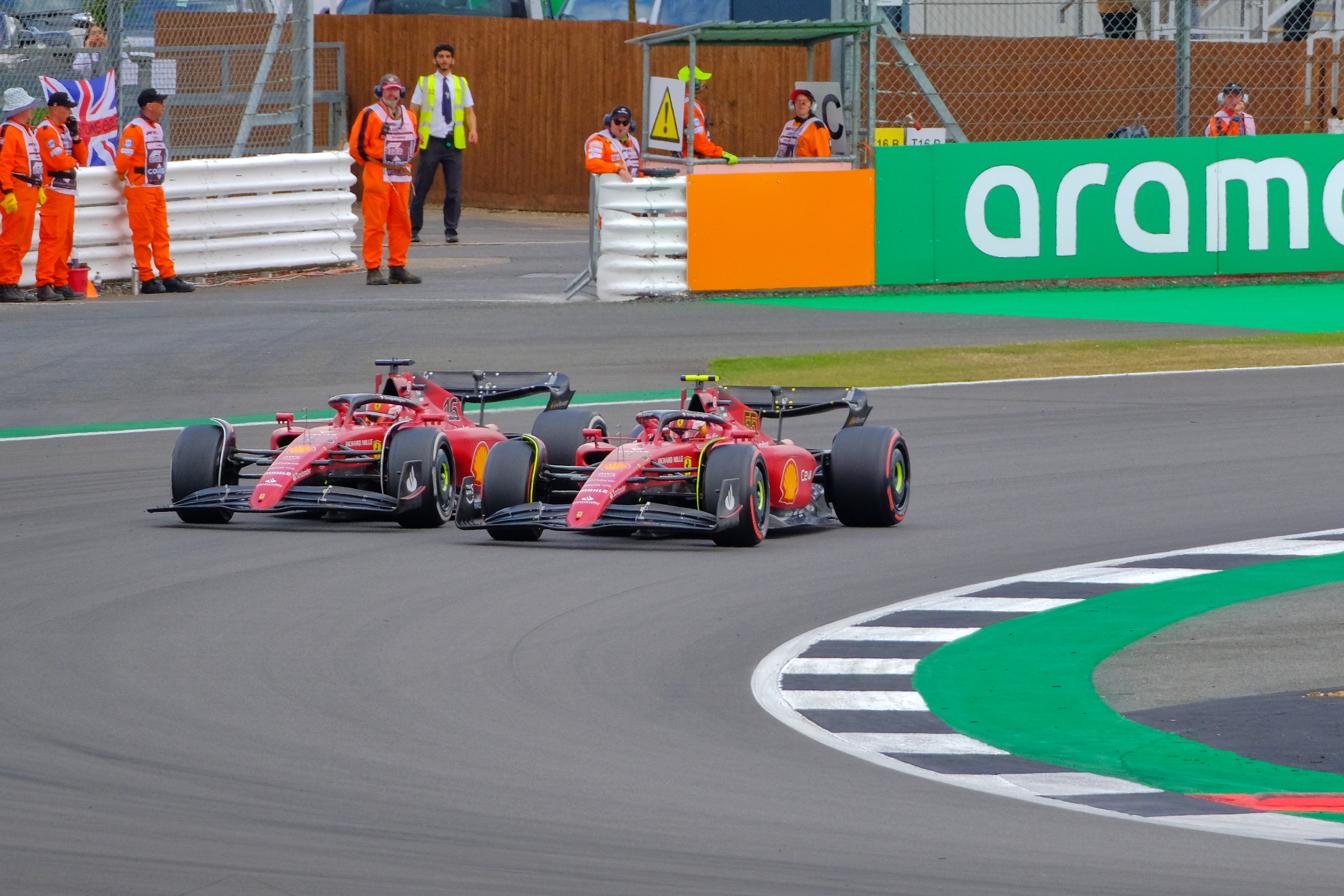
Scuderia Ferrari's Carlos Sainz Jr. (right) and Charles Leclerc battle for the lead. Sainz had started the race from pole position, his first in Formula One.

The race started at 15:00 local time on 3 July. Max Verstappen took the lead at the start from Carlos Sainz Jr., while Lewis Hamilton moved up to third. George Russell had a bad start and was passed by Nicholas Latifi, and Zhou Guanyu pulled alongside him leaving a large gap between them. Pierre Gasly attempted to pass between Zhou and Russell, but Russell moved to the left too late to close the gap causing his left rear tyre to make contact with Gasly's right front. Gasly backed out but the impact pointed Russell's car to the left shooting him across the track and directly into the side of Zhou's car. The impact launched Zhou's car into the air. He landed upside down, skidding down the track, then skipping and bouncing across the gravel trap at the end of the straight, all while barely slowing and turning sideways. The inverted car suddenly dug into the gravel carrying sufficient speed and momentum to launch it over the tire barrier, rotating 540 degrees on its axis before hitting the catch fencing sideways facing up just a few feet from the front row of the grandstand. It then dropped 8 feet and landed wedged into the small gap between the fence and tire barrier, stopping on its side with the cockpit up against the backside of the tire barrier. As a result of the incident, Valtteri Bottas slowed slightly, which caused Alexander Albon to also slow. Sebastian Vettel attempted to brake, but was too close to Albon and hit him. Albon spun into the concrete pit wall, rebounded back on the track and was hit by Yuki Tsunoda and Esteban Ocon, damaging both of their cars. Tsunoda and Ocon both returned to the pit lane for repairs, but Albon was unable to continue. Russell, who had spun and lost a rear tyre, stopped to help the marshals with Zhou's flipped car. When he returned to his car, the engine was not running, leaving him unable to continue.

Race control red-flagged the race due to both crashes. Zhou was extracted from his Alfa Romeo and stretchered to an ambulance where he was taken to the race medical centre. Albon was also taken to the race medical centre but was later transferred by helicopter to Coventry Hospital for observations. Both were later released.

The order for the race restart was set to the grid order, as not all the cars had passed the second safety car line before the race was red-flagged, meaning it was not possible to accurately determine the running order at the time of the red flag. The race restarted at 15:56 local time and Sainz retained the lead at the restart, before being passed by Verstappen once DRS was enabled. Verstappen later ran over debris, that resulted in a loss of pace. Verstappen misjudged that the loss of pace was a puncture and came into the pit for new tyres. Red Bull later realised it was floor damage that caused the pace loss.

The two AlphaTauri cars collided on lap 14, both continued initially but Gasly later retired due to the collision damage.

Bottas pitted and retired on lap 21 due to a gearbox issue and on lap 39, Ocon suffered a fuel pump problem and stopped on track, causing a safety car. The safety car allowed everyone to pit. Charles Leclerc was one of a few drivers not to pit, being told to stay out by his Ferrari team. Leclerc led the restart but was quickly passed by teammate Sainz. Leclerc subsequently defended from Sergio Pérez, which allowed Hamilton to pass them both on the exit of the last corner. Once Pérez passed Leclerc, he re-overtook Hamilton for second.

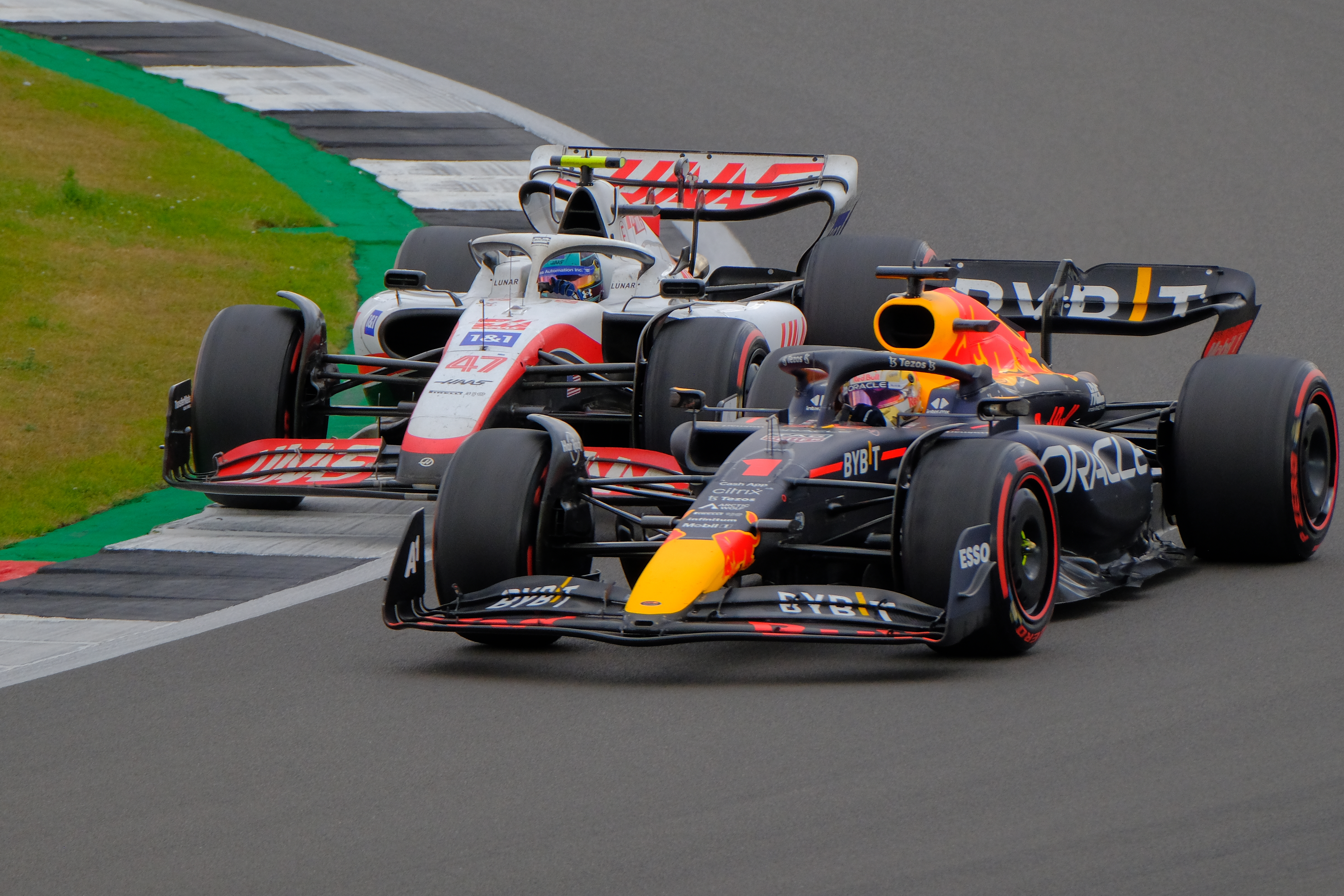
Haas driver Mick Schumacher battles Red Bull driver Max Verstappen en route to Schumacher's first points finish of his F1 career

Sainz won his first Formula One race, becoming the 112th winner in the history of the championship, the second Spaniard to win a Formula One race after Fernando Alonso, and being the first Spaniard to win a race since the 2013 Spanish Grand Prix, and the first driver who had his maiden win at the British Grand Prix since Johnny Herbert in 1995. Pérez was in second and Hamilton third, also setting the fastest lap. Leclerc managed to stay ahead of Alonso for fourth, as the latter finished fifth, ahead of Lando Norris. Despite a last lap battle, Verstappen held off Mick Schumacher for seventh. Schumacher finished inside the points for the first time in his Formula One career. Sebastian Vettel was ninth and Kevin Magnussen was tenth.

=== Attempted race disruption ===
Shortly after the race suspension on lap 1, a group of Just Stop Oil supporters walked onto the track at the Wellington Straight and sat down on the tarmac. They were later arrested by police. The protestors' cause was supported by drivers Fernando Alonso, Lewis Hamilton, and Carlos Sainz, though all three drivers said that these people should not have put themselves at risk of physical harm. F1 president Stefano Domenicali also criticized the protesting method. Before the race, Northamptonshire Police warned they had "creditable intelligence" that a group of protesters were planning to disrupt the race and potentially attempt a track invasion, and that the protest would be related to environmental issues, but the warning did not mention Just Stop Oil by name.

=== Post race ===
After the race, Russell stated that lessons needed to be learned from Zhou's crash, after rescue teams struggled to extract him from his car, which was in a narrow gap between the tyre barrier and the catch fencing, stating "[there was] nothing [Zhou] could have done". Russell went on to say that "We need think to avoid a car being stuck in such a fine gap." Concern was also raised surrounding the failure of the roll-hoop, designed to stop the driver's head hitting the ground in the event of a car being upside-down. Although Zhou's head was still protected by the halo (which he credited with saving his life), the roll-hoop failure would have trapped Zhou in his car had the car stopped upside-down. The FIA launched an investigation into the crash.

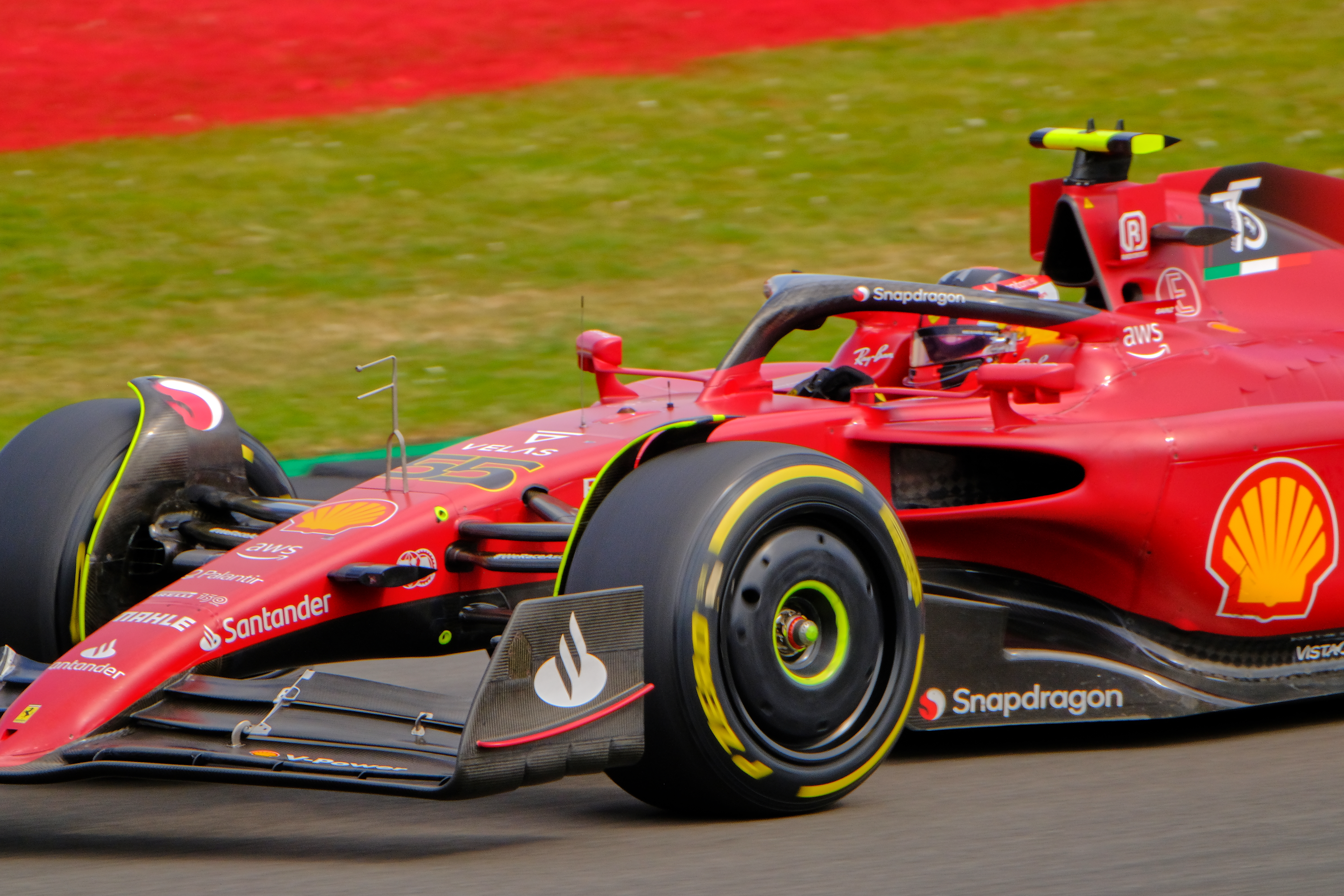
Carlos Sainz Jr. won his first race in Formula One.

=== Race classification ===
| Pos. | No. | Driver | Constructor | Laps | Time/Retired | Grid | Points |
|---|---|---|---|---|---|---|---|
| 1 | 55 | (Spain) Carlos Sainz Jr. | Ferrari | 52 | 2:17:50.311 | 1 | 25 |
| 2 | 11 | (Mexico) Sergio Pérez | Red Bull Racing-RBPT | 52 | +3.779 | 4 | 18 |
| 3 | 44 | (United Kingdom) Lewis Hamilton | Mercedes | 52 | +6.225 | 5 | 16^{1} |
| 4 | 16 | (Monaco) Charles Leclerc | Ferrari | 52 | +8.546 | 3 | 12 |
| 5 | 14 | (Spain) Fernando Alonso | Alpine-Renault | 52 | +9.571 | 7 | 10 |
| 6 | 4 | (United Kingdom) Lando Norris | McLaren-Mercedes | 52 | +11.943 | 6 | 8 |
| 7 | 1 | (Netherlands) Max Verstappen | Red Bull Racing-RBPT | 52 | +18.777 | 2 | 6 |
| 8 | 47 | (Germany) Mick Schumacher | Haas-Ferrari | 52 | +18.995 | 19 | 4 |
| 9 | 5 | (Germany) Sebastian Vettel | Aston Martin Aramco-Mercedes | 52 | +22.356 | 18 | 2 |
| 10 | 20 | (Denmark) Kevin Magnussen | Haas-Ferrari | 52 | +24.590 | 17 | 1 |
| 11 | 18 | (Canada) Lance Stroll | Aston Martin Aramco-Mercedes | 52 | +26.147 | 20 | |
| 12 | 6 | (Canada) Nicholas Latifi | Williams-Mercedes | 52 | +32.511 | 10 | |
| 13 | 3 | (Australia) Daniel Ricciardo | McLaren-Mercedes | 52 | +32.817 | 14 | |
| 14 | 22 | (Japan) Yuki Tsunoda | AlphaTauri-RBPT | 52 | +40.910 | 13 | |
| Ret | 31 | (France) Esteban Ocon | Alpine-Renault | 37 | Fuel pump | 15 | |
| Ret | 10 | (France) Pierre Gasly | AlphaTauri-RBPT | 26 | Collision damage | 11 | |
| Ret | 77 | (Finland) Valtteri Bottas | Alfa Romeo-Ferrari | 21 | Gearbox | 12 | |
| Ret | 63 | (United Kingdom) George Russell | Mercedes | 0 | Collision | 8 | |
| Ret | 24 | (China) Zhou Guanyu | Alfa Romeo-Ferrari | 0 | Collision | 9 | |
| Ret | 23 | (Thailand) Alexander Albon | Williams-Mercedes | 0 | Collision | 16 | |
Fastest lap: (United Kingdom) Lewis Hamilton (Mercedes) – 1:30.510 (lap 52)

Notes

- ^1 – Includes one point for fastest lap.

== Championship standings after the race ==
Drivers' Championship standings

| | Pos. | Driver | Points |
|---|---|---|---|
| | 1 | (Netherlands) Max Verstappen | 181 |
| | 2 | (Mexico) Sergio Pérez | 147 |
| | 3 | (Monaco) Charles Leclerc | 138 |
| 1 | 4 | (Spain) Carlos Sainz Jr. | 127 |
| 1 | 5 | (United Kingdom) George Russell | 111 |

Constructors' Championship standings

| Pos. | Constructor | Points |
|---|---|---|
| 1 | (Austria) Red Bull Racing-RBPT | 328 |
| 2 | (Italy) Ferrari | 265 |
| 3 | (Germany) Mercedes | 204 |
| 4 | (United Kingdom) McLaren-Mercedes | 73 |
| 5 | (France) Alpine-Renault | 67 |

- Note: Only the top five positions are included for both sets of standings.

== See also ==
- 2022 Silverstone Formula 2 round
- 2022 Silverstone Formula 3 round
- 2022 W Series Silverstone round

| Previous race: 2022 Canadian Grand Prix | FIA Formula One World Championship; 2022 season | Next race: 2022 Austrian Grand Prix |
| Previous race: 2021 British Grand Prix | British Grand Prix | Next race: 2023 British Grand Prix |
