= Lilian Cushon =

British healthcare worker

Lilian Cushon RRC & Bar
- Born: Lilian Ellen Cushon; 1873; Acton, Middlesex, England
- Died: 1967 (aged 93–94); Christchurch, Dorset, England
- Burial place: Lytchett Minster
- Education: The London Hospital
- Occupations: Nursing leader and principal matron

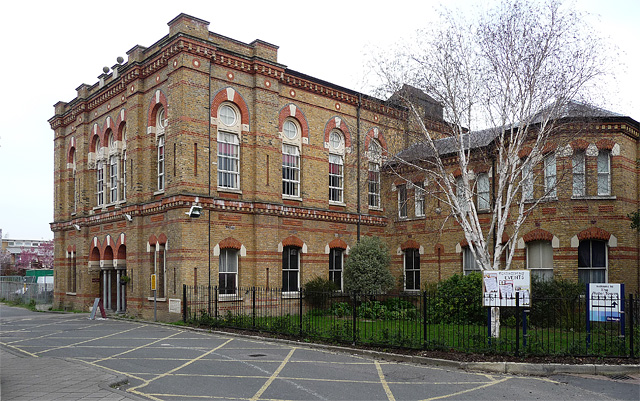
Lambeth Hospital, Brook Drive

Lilian Ellen Cushon RRC & Bar (1873–1967) was a British nursing leader. During World War I, she was principal matron of the British Red Cross Hospital at Netley. She was awarded the Royal Red Cross in 1917 and the Bar in 1919.

== Early life ==
Cushon was born in 1873 in Acton, Middlesex. She was the middle child of seven born to her father Thomas, a gardener, and her mother Martha.

== Career ==
Cushon worked at the London Fever Hospital in Islington for three years before she trained at The London Hospital under Eva Luckes. From 1898 to 1900, she trained as a probationer nurse at The London. After her training was complete she remained at The London, firstly as a Staff Nurse, and then as a Ward Sister until 1906. She was then appointed as a Home Sister at Bristol Royal Infirmary under fellow Londoner, and matron Anna Baillie. In 1909 Cushon became Assistant Matron of Lambeth Infirmary, London, where she was highly regarded for her efficient work. During 1915, because of the shortage of medical staff who were away at war, she singlehandedly prepared the probationer nurses for their examinations. She was appointed as Principal Matron of the British Red Cross Hospital in Netley in 1915. She held this post until 1919. Cushon briefly worked as matron of Birmingham and Midland Eye Hospital, Birmingham from August 1919. She was matron of Gifford House Hospital in 1921 before she returned to Lambeth Infirmary during the 1920s. She was also a trained midwife.

== Retirement ==
Cushon retired in the 1930s and lived in Malmesbury, Wiltshire. She died in September 1967 in Christchurch. Her cremated ashes were buried on 7 October 1967 at Lytchett Minster, Dorset.

== Honours ==
Cushon was awarded the Royal Red Cross in 1917 and the bar in 1919. Receiving the RRC and a bar was extremely rare. This award was introduced for nurses from December 1917. During the Great War eighty-two women received this ultimate honour, all senior members of the military nursing services.
