= Hisham Mehanna =

British head and neck surgeon and academic

Hisham Mehanna FMedSci
- Education: University of Glasgow (MBChB, BMedSci)
- Alma mater: Erasmus University Rotterdam (PhD)
- Occupations: Professor of Head and Neck Surgery
- Known for: Principal Investigator of the De-ESCALaTE HPV and PETNECK trials
- Awards: Fellow of the Academy of Medical Sciences (FMedSci)
- Scientific career
- Fields: Head and Neck Surgery, Oncology
- Workplaces: University of Birmingham, University Hospitals Birmingham NHS Foundation Trust

Hisham Mehanna FMedSci is a British academic and surgeon specialising in Head and Neck Surgery and Oncology. He is Professor of Head and Neck Surgery at the University of Birmingham, Honorary Consultant Head and Neck and Thyroid Surgeon at University Hospitals Birmingham NHS Foundation Trust, and Director of the Institute of Head and Neck Studies and Education (InHANSE).

Mehanna is internationally recognised for his work in clinical trials and translational research, particularly relating to HPV-positive oropharyngeal cancer. He is a Fellow of the Academy of Medical Sciences.

== Early life and education ==
Mehanna earned a Bachelor of Medical Sciences (Hons) from the University of Kuwait in 1990, followed by an MBChB (Hons) from the University of Glasgow in 1994. He completed fellowship training at the Auckland Head and Neck Surgery Unit in New Zealand in 2004, and was awarded the FRCS (1998) and FRCS (ORL-HNS) (2002) by the Royal College of Physicians and Surgeons of Glasgow. In 2010, he received a PhD from Erasmus University Rotterdam for research on quality-of-life assessment in patients with head and neck cancer.

== Career ==
Mehanna served as Consultant Head and Neck and Thyroid Surgeon at University Hospitals Coventry and Warwickshire NHS Trust between 2004 and 2012.

He joined the University of Birmingham in 2012 as Professor of Head and Neck Surgery in the Institute of Cancer and Genomic Sciences. He became Director of the Institute of Head and Neck Studies and Education (InHANSE).

From 2020 to 2025, he served as Deputy Pro Vice-Chancellor for Interdisciplinary Research at the University of Birmingham, where he oversaw the development and coordination of research strategy across the institution’s five colleges. He previously directed the Institute for Global Innovation from 2018 to 2022 and the Institute of Advanced Studies from 2019 to 2022. He also served as the College of Medical and Dental Sciences’ Director of Business Engagement from 2014 to 2017.

== Research ==
Mehanna’s research focuses on the epidemiology, prevention, and management of head and neck cancer, with particular emphasis on HPV-associated oropharyngeal cancer (HPV-associated OPC). His clinical trials and translational research have informed head and neck cancer practice guidelines internationally, with impact reflected in national and multinational guideline updates across the USA, UK, Europe, and Asia.

His research interests include:

Epidemiology and prevention of HPV-associated OPC: Mehanna has contributed to studies examining the rising incidence and geographical variation of HPV-associated oropharyngeal cancer. He has also led research assessing the effectiveness of HPV vaccination in preventing oral HPV infection.

Development and evaluation of treatments: He has led several multinational randomised trials—including PET-NECK (New England Journal of Medicine, 2016) and De-ESCALaTE HPV (The Lancet, 2019)—which evaluated treatment strategies for HPV-related head and neck cancer, including chemotherapy selection and PET-CT–guided reductions in routine neck dissection.

Personalised treatment approaches: His work includes the EPIC international study, published in The Lancet Oncology (2023), investigating diagnostic approaches for HPV-associated OPC. Mehanna has also contributed to the development of prognostic and predictive molecular biomarkers, including the PredICTR and CorrelaTE classifiers, some of which are under patent application.

Artificial intelligence and real-world data: Mehanna has collaborated on early applications of artificial intelligence and machine learning in head and neck cancer, including the development of algorithms for automated diagnosis and risk stratification. He leads TacTIC, the first multinational trial evaluating AI-supported approaches in head and neck cancer.

== Leadership and professional roles ==
Mehanna has held numerous national and international leadership roles, including:

- President, Head and Neck Cancer International Group (HNCIG) (2019–present)
- Research Lead and Executive Committee Member, International Federation of Head and Neck Oncologic Societies (IFHNOS) (2023–present)
- NIHR Senior Investigator (2019–2024)
- President, British Association of Head and Neck Oncologists (2017–2019)

== Honors and awards ==
- Order of Merit, International Federation of Head and Neck Oncology Societies (2025)
- Fellow of the Academy of Medical Sciences (FMedSci) (2024)
- University of Birmingham’s Founders’ Award for Excellence in Business Advancement (2015)

== Selected Publications ==
- Mehanna H, et al. PET-CT Surveillance versus Neck Dissection in Advanced Head and Neck Cancer. N Engl J Med. 2016;374(15):1444–1454.
- Mehanna H, et al. Radiotherapy plus cisplatin or cetuximab in low-risk HPV-positive oropharyngeal cancer (De-ESCALaTE HPV). The Lancet. 2019;393(10166):51–60.
- Mehanna H, et al. Prognostic implications of p16 and HPV discordance in oropharyngeal cancer (HNCIG-EPIC-OPC). Lancet Oncol. 2023;24(3):239–251.
- Wilson JA, O'Hara J, Fouweather T, ... Mehanna H, et al. Conservative management versus tonsillectomy in adults with recurrent acute tonsillitis (NATTINA). The Lancet. 2023;401(10393):2051–2059.
- Mehanna H, et al. Evaluation of US Elastography in Thyroid Nodule Diagnosis (ElaTION Trial). Radiology. 2024;313(1):e240705.
- Mehanna H, Moledina J, Travis J. Refeeding syndrome: what it is, and how to prevent and treat it. BMJ. 2008;336:1495–1498.
- Mehanna H, et al. Prevalence of human papillomavirus in head and neck cancer: systematic review and meta-analysis. Head Neck.
