= Temozolomide overprescription incident =

Medical incident in the United Kingdom

The Temozolomide overprescription incident occurred at the University Hospitals Coventry and Warwickshire NHS Trust (UHCW). It involved an investigation into consultant clinical oncologist, Ian Brown, who was alleged to have kept patients on the chemotherapy drug temozolomide for much longer than the NHS recommended guideline of six months.

== Background ==
Ian Brown is a consultant clinical oncologist who worked in University Hospitals Coventry and Warwickshire NHS Trust (UHCW) until 2023. Brown gained his medical qualification at the University of Cambridge, graduating in 1980. He gained his provisional registration with the General Medical Council (GMC) in December 1979 and had this extended to a full registration in February 1981. In January 2001 he joined the Specialist Register as a clinical oncologist.

== Overprescription ==
In 2023, it was found that Brown had been keeping patients on temozolomide for much longer than the NHS recommended guideline of six months. Temozolomide is a chemotherapy drug that is normally prescribed following radiotherapy. It is used to treat brain tumours, normally being taken in six cycles over six months but the drug manufacturers claim it can be taken for up to twelve months. The overprescription of the medication was only discovered when Brown retired in 2023 and his patient's care was taken over by new consultants. Since Brown's retirement more than 30 other brain cancer patients have raised concerns about their care.

Patients reported a range of side effects as a result of the extended use of the drug, including joint pain, chronic fatigue, dental problems, and nausea. One patient has reported that the drug may have caused a secondary cancer, and another reported developing liver damage. A female patient was told she would be unable to have children due to the temozolomide she had taken over a six-year period. She was told to freeze her eggs before the medication was started, but claimed she was not given enough time to arrange fertility preservation before she began the medication. When patients questioned if they should still be on the medication, Brown informed them that they would die without it. Some patients asked clinicians in the UHCW about gastrointestinal problems they were struggling with as a side effect, but their concerns were dismissed.

One patient had been taking the medication for 16 years. Another patient was told initially told she would be on the medication for six months as part of a medical trial, but her medical record contained no record of this. After six months, she was then told she needed to be on the medication for life. In one case, a patient later discovered that they had been misdiagnosed and their tumour was never cancerous. They had undergone surgery and taken temozolomide for 13 years. Some patients had already had their medication stopped by Brown, as a result of him declaring their condition was stable. One woman described how she took temozolomide for over six years, before being discharged by Brown, only discovering that she did not need to have taken the medication for that long when UHCW contacted her after Brown's retirement. Lawyers representing the affected patients say they have heard from one patient who began long term temozolomide prescribed by Brown in 1998.

=== Investigation ===
Following patient complaints and contact from lawyers, UHCW began an internal patient safety review, covering patients from 2017 to 2023. As of 2025, the findings had not publicly shared, as the Trust said it was waiting for the Royal College of Physicians review. The Trust said they have reviewed and spoken to all patients who were receiving temozolomide at the end of 2023 to ensure they had care plans in place. Lawyers representing the patients have called for the investigations to extend to 2006 and for the scope of the review to be expanded to include other clinicians and pharmacists. Following Freedom of Information requests, it was discovered that UHCW had spent over £3.6 million on temozolomide between 2009–2024, more than 10 times the amount used by comparable NHS hospitals.

Since the discovery of the overprescription of temozolamide for some patients, UHCW have ensured patients stop temozolomide cycles between six or twelve cycles, and that additional input is given from other medical professionals during diagnosis and the creation of a patient's treatment plan.

On 23 August 2024 the General Medical Council placed restrictions on Brown's medical licence and began an investigation into his practice. These interim restrictions prevent Brown from prescribing or administering chemotherapy drugs.

UHCW commissioned the Royal College of Physicians to conduct an independent review into any patients who received more than 12 cycles of temozolomide between 2017–2023. The Care Quality Commission confirmed in January 2025 that they were investigating the misuse of the medication at UHCW.

=== Findings ===
In September 2026, preliminary findings from the Royal College of Physicians review were leaked to the BBC. The preliminary findings found that there was little or no evidence of benefit for the extended use of temozolomide. Brown was not involved in the review, with the review team saying they were unable to discuss their concerns directly with him. They found that Brown often failed to attend departmental meetings, avoided his managerial demands, and had developed a backlog of patient mortality reviews. An anonymous doctor at the hospital was also criticised, with the review finding that he was practising outside of recognised standards. The review also highlighted that the pharmacy team had failed to notice the extended use of temozolomide.

The final findings from the Royal College of Physicians review were published on 18 November 2026. UHCW issued a public apology related to the failures of care.
