= Hospital of St Cross, Rugby =

Hospital in Rugby, England

Hospital of St Cross
- University Hospitals Coventry and Warwickshire NHS Trust
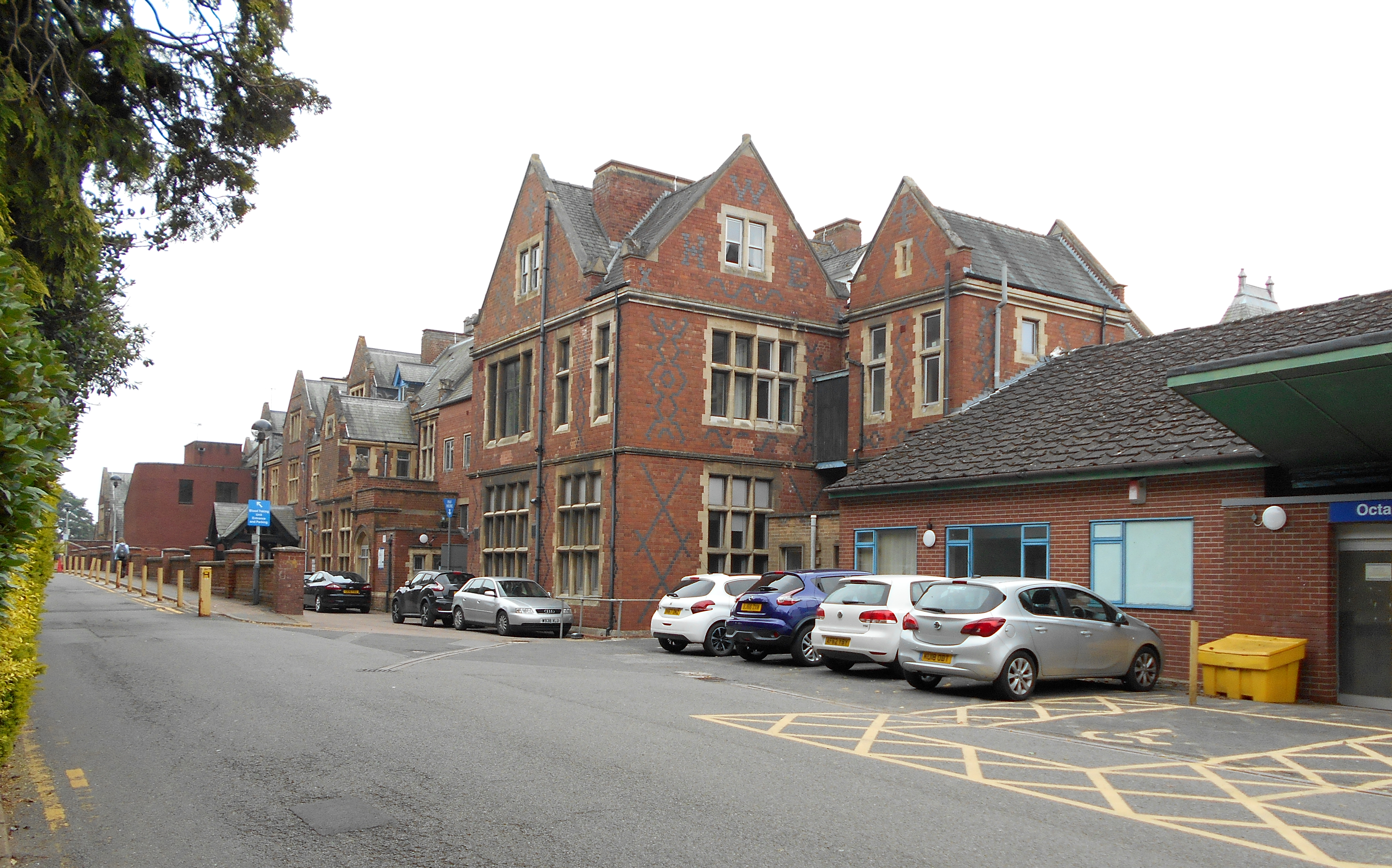
- Victorian buildings at the old part of the hospital

Geography
- Location: Barby Road, Rugby, Warwickshire, England
- Coordinates: 52.3640°N 1.2589°W

Organisation
- Care system: NHS
- Type: General
- Affiliated university: Warwick Medical School

Services
- Emergency department: No (has an Urgent Treatment Centre)
- Beds: 110

History
- Founded: 1884

Links
- Website: www.uhcw.nhs.uk/find/stcross

The Hospital of St Cross is a National Health Service hospital on Barby Road, in Rugby, Warwickshire, England, managed by the University Hospitals Coventry and Warwickshire NHS Trust. It is on the south edge of Rugby above a steep slope running down to the Sow Brook valley.

== History ==
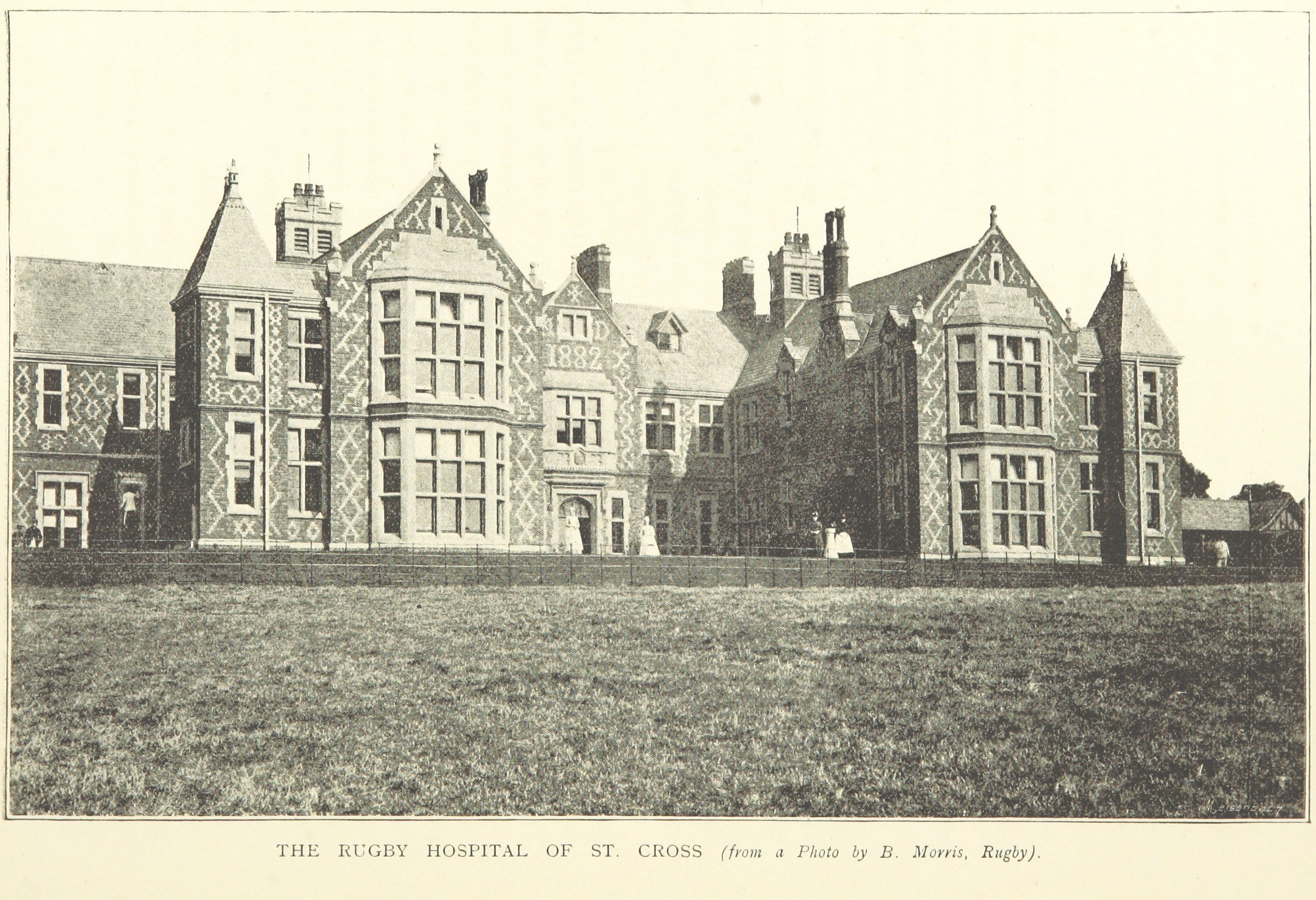
1890s picture of the original hospital

The hospital was founded by Richard Henry Wood DL, a wealthy stockbroker who was originally from Manchester, but who had lived in Rugby for 21 years, and his wife, Elizabeth Wood (née Hatton) to replace an earlier nursing home in Castle Street, which had opened in 1869, and was no-longer adequate for the town's needs. The Woods' donated a plot of land off Barby Road and a donation of a million pounds to build the hospital. Named after the Hospital of St Cross in Winchester, it was designed by Henry Wilson, of Gray's Inn Square, and opened in July 1884. When opened it had three nurses, four support staff, and 31 beds. The hospital has undergone numerous extensions since, with many new buildings added. The original building is still extant.

The Victoria Diamond Jubilee Wing was opened by the founder in July 1899, the children's wing was opened by Princess Henry of Battenburg in October 1907 and a new out-patient department was opened by the Duchess of York in April 1929. In 1932 a sun pavilion was added on the south side, when fresh air was viewed as an effective treatment.

It joined the National Health Service in 1948. In the early-1990s, St Cross was further enlarged, after the decision was taken to close St Luke's Hospital in Rugby, and move all of its services to St Cross, this was completed in 1993. A new Diamond Jubilee rehabilitation centre was opened by Princess Alexandra of Kent in April 2014. 2021 saw the opening of The Maple Unit, a £1 million purpose-built Haematology and Oncology centre.

== Notable staff ==
Between 1896 and 1925 all three matrons trained at The London Hospital under Eva Luckes.

- Anna Beatrix Baillie R.R.C. (1864–1958), Matron 1896–1898, trained at The London in 1888 and between 1890 and 1892. She initiated the building of the Victoria Wing, but left before it was completed to become matron of Bristol Royal Infirmary in 1898.
- Caroline Walker (1866– ), Matron, 1898-1899 Walker trained at The London between 1889 and 1891.
- Florence Osborne (1869– ), Matron, 1899 to 1925, trained at Tyrone County Infirmary and partly at The London between 1897 and 1898. Osborne was appointed Charge Nurse at Rugby in 1898, becoming matron shortly afterwards. During the First World War Osborne kept pigs, poultry and rabbits to feed the patients.

== Facilities ==
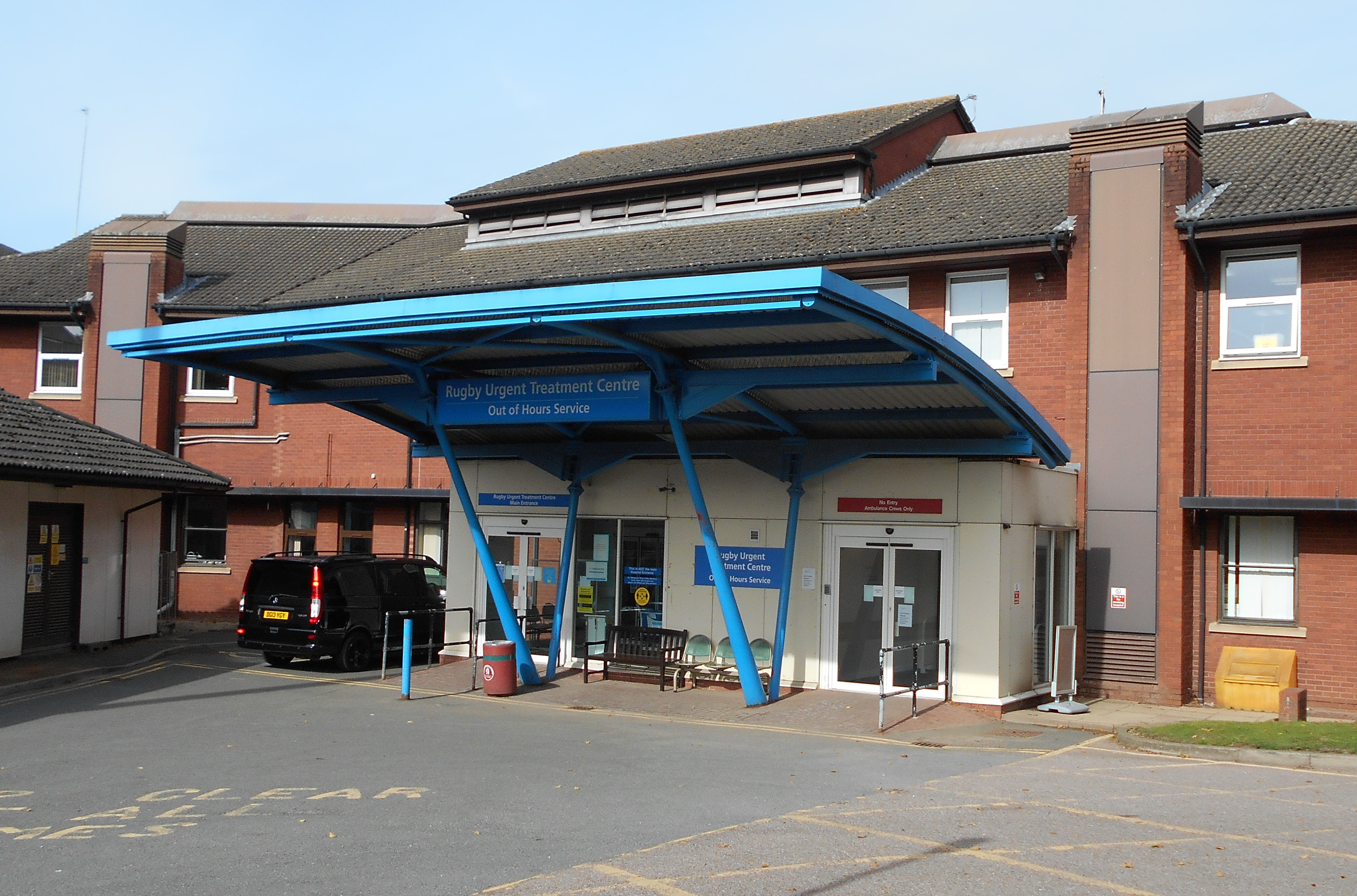
Entrance to urgent treatment centre

The hospital has 110 beds and six operating theatres, which specialise in elective surgery. It has an urgent treatment centre for minor injuries and illnesses, which is open every day, 24 hours a day, but does not have a full Accident and Emergency department, the nearest of which is based at University Hospital Coventry. It has a blood taking unit. It also provides rehabilitation, outpatient and screening services. A more extensive range of medical services are provided at the University Hospital Coventry which is the principal hospital serving the Coventry and Rugby area.

In 1997, the hospital's Accident and Emergency department was downgraded to a minor injuries unit; there has been a campaign locally to restore full A&E services to the hospital, citing a growing local population, and the long journey to the nearest A&E department in Coventry, some 12 miles (19 km) away.

== Rating ==
In 2020, the Care Quality Commission rated the hospital as "good" overall.

== Myton Hospice ==
Sharing the site of St Cross Hospital is Rugby Myton Hospice which was opened in 2002. This is not an NHS facility, but is funded largely by charitable donations.

== See also ==
- List of hospitals in England
