= St Luke's Hospital, Rugby =

St Luke's Hospital
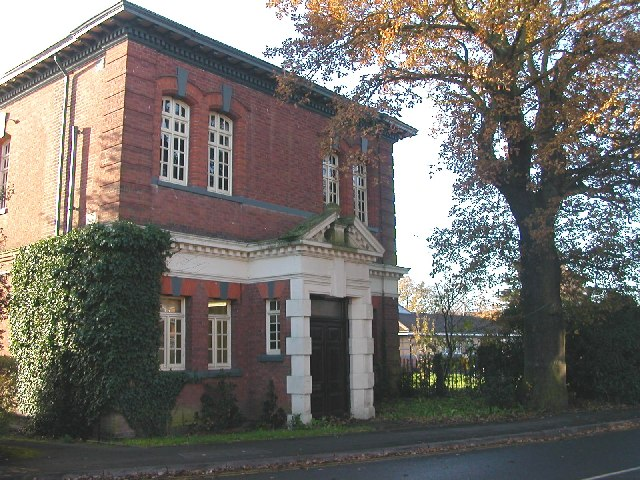
- The former workhouse boardroom, the only surviving building of the former workhouse and hospital.

Geography
- Location: Lower Hillmorton Road, Rugby, Warwickshire, England, United Kingdom
- Coordinates: 52.370297°N 1.251532°W

Organisation
- Care system: National Health Service

History
- Founded: 1948
- Closed: 1993

Links
- Lists: Hospitals in the United Kingdom

St Luke's Hospital was a former hospital in Rugby, Warwickshire, England, on Lower Hillmorton Road, between 1948 and 1993, although the facility had its origins in 1819 as a workhouse.

== History ==
The site originated as the Rugby Union Workhouse, which was opened just off Lower Hillmorton Road in 1819. The institution was enlarged gradually over the years, until 1930, when it became a local-authority-run Public Assistance Institution for caring for the elderly, infirm and chronically sick. During the Second World War it was used as a hospital under the Emergency Hospital Service. From 1948 the site was taken over by the newly-established National Health Service (NHS) and named St Luke's Hospital.

St Luke's primarily functioned as an infirmary, though a nurses' training school opened there in 1951, and child development services were moved there in 1982. In the early 1990s the decision was taken to close St Luke's and move its services to nearby St Cross Hospital, which was enlarged at the same time. By April 1993 all of the patients had been transferred, and St Luke's was closed.

In 1994 the site was sold to housing developers, who demolished most of the buildings for a new housing development called Morton Gardens. Only the former workhouse boardroom remains. The site of the hospital is now covered by housing, a general practice surgery, and an NHS clinic called the Orchard Centre.
