= 2022 Canadian Grand Prix =

9th round of the Formula One season

Race 9 of 22 in the 2022 Formula One World Championship
← Previous race	Next race →
- Layout of the Circuit Gilles Villeneuve

Race details
- Date: 19 June 2022
- Official name: Formula 1 AWS Grand Prix du Canada 2022
- Location: Circuit Gilles Villeneuve; Montreal, Quebec, Canada
- Course: Street circuit
- Course length: 4.361 km (2.710 miles)
- Distance: 70 laps, 305.270 km (189.700 miles)
- Weather: Sunny
- Attendance: 338,000

Pole position
Driver	(Netherlands) Max Verstappen	Red Bull Racing-RBPT
- Time: 1:21.299

Fastest lap
Driver	(Spain) Carlos Sainz Jr.	Ferrari
- Time: 1:15.749 on lap 63

Podium
First	(Netherlands) Max Verstappen	Red Bull Racing-RBPT
Second	(Spain) Carlos Sainz Jr.	Ferrari
Third	(United Kingdom) Lewis Hamilton	Mercedes

The 2022 Canadian Grand Prix (officially known as the Formula 1 AWS Grand Prix du Canada 2022) was a Formula One motor race, which was held on 19 June 2022 at the Circuit Gilles Villeneuve in Montreal, Quebec, Canada. It was the ninth round of the 2022 Formula One World Championship. Max Verstappen took pole position, in a rain affected qualifying, from Fernando Alonso and Carlos Sainz Jr. Verstappen converted his pole into victory, ahead of Sainz and Lewis Hamilton.

His victory – coupled with his teammate Sergio Pérez retiring from the race – enabled Verstappen to increase his points advantage in the World Drivers' Championship to 46 points over Pérez, with Leclerc trailing the latter further three points in third. Red Bull maintained their lead in the World Constructors' Championship, but it was slightly cut short by two points to 76 points over Ferrari.

== Background ==
The race was the 57th running of the Canadian Grand Prix, the 51st time the event had been included as a round of the Formula One World Championship since the inception of the series in 1950, the 41st time that a World Championship had been held at Circuit Gilles Villeneuve and the first race in Canada since 2019 as the 2020 and 2021 races were cancelled due to the COVID-19 pandemic. The race took place one week after the Azerbaijan Grand Prix and precedes the British Grand Prix. The race was also Lance Stroll's and Nicholas Latifi's home race. It was also Max Verstappen's 150th F1 race.

=== Championship standings before the race ===
In the Drivers' Championship, Max Verstappen led with 150 points, 21 points ahead of teammate Sergio Pérez in second, with Charles Leclerc in third position. Red Bull Racing led Ferrari by 80 points, and Mercedes by 118 points in the Constructors' Championship.

=== Entrants ===
The drivers and teams were the same as the season entry list with no additional stand-in drivers for the race.

=== Tyre choices ===
Tyre supplier Pirelli brought the C3, C4, and C5 tyre compounds (designated hard, medium, and soft, respectively) for teams to use at the event.

== Practice ==
Three practice sessions for the Grand Prix were held, each one hour in length. The first practice session took place on 17 June, at 14:00 local time (UTC−04:00). The session ended with no major incidents. Early in the session, Esteban Ocon got a paper towel lodged in his brake duct and was forced to return to the pits. Alexander Albon, Mick Schumacher, Kevin Magnussen and Nicholas Latifi all missed turn 12 corner and retreated to the escape road in separate incidents. All four were unscathed and carried on. Championship leader, Max Verstappen was fastest, with Carlos Sainz Jr. and Fernando Alonso in second and third, respectively.

The second practice session took place on 17 June at 17:00 local time. Charles Leclerc stopped at the exit of the pitlane because of issues with his turbocharger. After the session, Leclerc would require a change of turbo, resulting in a 10-place grid drop for exceeding his allocation of turbos. Sebastian Vettel was released into the path of Magnussen in the pit lane. The FIA deemed the release to be unsafe and Aston Martin team was fined €5,000. Sainz was also released into the path of Lando Norris, but the FIA did not feel it was unsafe. Verstappen was once again fastest, with Leclerc and Sainz in second and third, respectively.

The third practice session was held at 13:00 local time on 18 June. Rain meant the drivers were completing laps on the wet and intermediate tyres throughout the session. Yuki Tsunoda, Magnussen and Vettel all went off at turn 1, while Verstappen spun onto the grass at turn 2. Sainz took to the escape road at turn 3 and used the run off at turn 8. Alonso was fastest, with Pierre Gasly and Vettel in second and third respectively.

== Qualifying ==
=== Qualifying report ===
Qualifying took place at 16:00 local time on 18 June, and lasted for one hour. The whole session was conducted with water on the track and so all drivers used the wet and intermediate tyres to complete their laps, with the exception of George Russell who changed to slick tyres in the latter stages of qualifying.

The first section of qualifying had all drivers completing their laps with no issues. Carlos Sainz Jr., Charles Leclerc and Alexander Albon were all noted by the stewards for driving too slow, but they were not penalised. Yuki Tsunoda, who was required to start from the back after taking new power unit components, Nicholas Latifi, Lance Stroll, Sebastian Vettel and Pierre Gasly were knocked out from the first part of qualifying.

The second section of qualifying had Albon in the wall at turn 5 early in the session. He was able to find reverse and carry on. Sergio Pérez hit the wall at turn 3. A red flag was waved and Pérez jumped out the car and was out of the session. Issues for Lando Norris meant he was unable to set a lap time and was also out of the session. Leclerc, who had taken new power unit components, and was due to start from the back of the grid, did not risk going out on the wet track and was also out of the session. Albon, Valtteri Bottas, Zhou Guanyu and Esteban Ocon all improved their lap times at the end of the session, with Albon and Bottas not fast enough and being eliminated from qualifying.

In the third part of qualifying, all drivers completed banker laps on intermediate tyres with Max Verstappen putting himself on provisional pole. Noticing a dry line around most of the track, George Russell gambled on slick tyres for his final attempt, believing that if he could survive the wet turns 1 and 2, he would have a shot at pole. At turn 2 on his qualifying lap, Russell drove through a puddle, spun, and hit the wall. He was able to carry on and found his way back to the pit lane. Verstappen took pole position, Fernando Alonso took second, and Sainz was third after making a mistake out of the final corner. Hamilton finished fourth and the two Haases were fifth and sixth, their best team qualifying since the 2018 German Grand Prix.

=== Qualifying classification ===
Pos.	No.	Driver	Constructor	Qualifying times			Final grid
Pos.	No.	Driver	Constructor	Q1	Q2	Q3	Final grid
1	1	(Netherlands) Max Verstappen	Red Bull Racing-RBPT	1:32.219	1:23.746	1:21.299	1
2	14	(Spain) Fernando Alonso	Alpine-Renault	1:32.277	1:24.848	1:21.944	2
3	55	(Spain) Carlos Sainz Jr.	Ferrari	1:32.781	1:25.197	1:22.096	3
4	44	(United Kingdom) Lewis Hamilton	Mercedes	1:33.841	1:25.543	1:22.891	4
5	20	(Denmark) Kevin Magnussen	Haas-Ferrari	1:32.957	1:26.254	1:22.960	5
6	47	(Germany) Mick Schumacher	Haas-Ferrari	1:33.707	1:25.684	1:23.356	6
7	31	(France) Esteban Ocon	Alpine-Renault	1:33.012	1:26.135	1:23.529	7
8	63	(United Kingdom) George Russell	Mercedes	1:33.160	1:24.950	1:23.557	8
9	3	(Australia) Daniel Ricciardo	McLaren-Mercedes	1:33.636	1:26.375	1:23.749	9
10	24	(China) Zhou Guanyu	Alfa Romeo-Ferrari	1:33.692	1:26.116	1:24.030	10
11	77	(Finland) Valtteri Bottas	Alfa Romeo-Ferrari	1:33.689	1:26.788	N/A	11
12	23	(Thailand) Alexander Albon	Williams-Mercedes	1:34.047	1:26.858	N/A	12
13	11	(Mexico) Sergio Pérez	Red Bull Racing-RBPT	1:33.929	1:33.127	N/A	13
14	4	(United Kingdom) Lando Norris	McLaren-Mercedes	1:34.066	No time	N/A	14
15	16	(Monaco) Charles Leclerc	Ferrari	1:33.008	No time	N/A	19^{1}
16	10	(France) Pierre Gasly	AlphaTauri-RBPT	1:34.492	N/A	N/A	15
17	5	(Germany) Sebastian Vettel	Aston Martin Aramco-Mercedes	1:34.512	N/A	N/A	16
18	18	(Canada) Lance Stroll	Aston Martin Aramco-Mercedes	1:35.532	N/A	N/A	17
19	6	(Canada) Nicholas Latifi	Williams-Mercedes	1:35.660	N/A	N/A	18
20	22	(Japan) Yuki Tsunoda	AlphaTauri-RBPT	1:36.575	N/A	N/A	20^{2}
107% time: 1:38.674

Notes

- ^1 – Charles Leclerc was required to start the race from the back of the grid for exceeding his quota of power unit elements.
- ^2 – Yuki Tsunoda was required to start the race from the back of the grid for exceeding his quota of power unit elements. The penalty made no difference as he qualified in the last position.

== Race ==
=== Race report ===
The race started at 14:00 local time on 19 June, and ran for 70 laps. From the front row, Max Verstappen got a better start than Fernando Alonso and kept the lead into turn one. Into turn three, Kevin Magnussen and Lewis Hamilton were going side by side and made slight contact. Nothing was broken on Hamilton's car, but Magnussen's front wing endplate was hanging off. After complaints from Esteban Ocon and others, Magnussen was black and orange flagged, meaning he was forced to pit to repair the damage. After the race, Magnussen claimed it is too easy to "influence" the race directors. On lap eight, Sergio Pérez pulled off the circuit at turn eight due to a gearbox failure, retiring from the race and bringing out the virtual safety car (VSC). Red Bull took advantage of the VSC period and pitted Verstappen onto a new set of hard compound tyres. Verstappen rejoined the race in third behind Carlos Sainz Jr. and Alonso. On Lap 19, Mick Schumacher retired his car in the runoff of turn eight with an engine failure, bringing out the race's second VSC. Ferrari chose to pit Sainz and he rejoined in second, 9.5 seconds behind Verstappen. Verstappen pitted on lap 43 for new hard tyres under green flag conditions, rejoining in third behind Sainz and Hamilton. On fresh tyres, Verstappen was able to closely follow Hamilton through the first two sectors before overtaking him between turns 10 and 12 at the end of lap 43 to retake second. On lap 48 Yuki Tsunoda crashed at turn two after locking up on the pit exit, bringing out the safety car which allowed Sainz to pit for new hard tyres and rejoin just behind the leader Verstappen with six-laps-younger tyres. A 16-lap sprint to the finish saw Sainz get close to overtaking Verstappen down the straight between turns 10 and 12, (Note: As turn 11 is taken flat-out, the stretch of track between turns 10 and 12 is referred to as one straight.) but was unable to pass. Verstappen won by just under a second with Sainz finishing in second. Hamilton rounded out the podium with George Russell fourth. Charles Leclerc made his way up to fifth after taking a new power unit and starting 19th on the grid, limiting the damage in his title challenge. Ocon crossed the line in sixth ahead of his teammate Alonso, who was suffering with an engine issue that started in the middle of the race. A post-race penalty for weaving down the straight saw Alonso drop from seventh at the flag to ninth behind Valtteri Bottas and Zhou Guanyu. Lance Stroll rounded out the top ten finishers in his home race.

=== Race classification ===
Pos.	No.	Driver	Constructor	Laps	Time/Retired	Grid	Points
1	1	(Netherlands) Max Verstappen	Red Bull Racing-RBPT	70	1:36:21.757	1	25
2	55	(Spain) Carlos Sainz Jr.	Ferrari	70	+0.993	3	19^{1}
3	44	(United Kingdom) Lewis Hamilton	Mercedes	70	+7.006	4	15
4	63	(United Kingdom) George Russell	Mercedes	70	+12.313	8	12
5	16	(Monaco) Charles Leclerc	Ferrari	70	+15.168	19	10
6	31	(France) Esteban Ocon	Alpine-Renault	70	+23.890	7	8
7	77	(Finland) Valtteri Bottas	Alfa Romeo-Ferrari	70	+25.247	11	6
8	24	(China) Zhou Guanyu	Alfa Romeo-Ferrari	70	+26.952	10	4
9	14	(Spain) Fernando Alonso	Alpine-Renault	70	+29.945^{2}	2	2
10	18	(Canada) Lance Stroll	Aston Martin Aramco-Mercedes	70	+38.222	17	1
11	3	(Australia) Daniel Ricciardo	McLaren-Mercedes	70	+43.047	9	
12	5	(Germany) Sebastian Vettel	Aston Martin Aramco-Mercedes	70	+44.245	16	
13	23	(Thailand) Alexander Albon	Williams-Mercedes	70	+44.893	12	
14	10	(France) Pierre Gasly	AlphaTauri-RBPT	70	+45.183	15	
15	4	(United Kingdom) Lando Norris	McLaren-Mercedes	70	+52.145^{3}	14	
16	6	(Canada) Nicholas Latifi	Williams-Mercedes	70	+59.978	18	
17	20	(Denmark) Kevin Magnussen	Haas-Ferrari	70	+1:08.180	5	
Ret	22	(Japan) Yuki Tsunoda	AlphaTauri-RBPT	47	Accident	20	
Ret	47	(Germany) Mick Schumacher	Haas-Ferrari	18	Engine	6	
Ret	11	(Mexico) Sergio Pérez	Red Bull Racing-RBPT	7	Gearbox	13	
Fastest lap: (Spain) Carlos Sainz Jr. (Ferrari) – 1:15.749 (lap 63)

Notes

- ^1 – Includes one point for fastest lap.
- ^2 – Fernando Alonso finished seventh on track, but he received a post-race five-second time penalty for making more than one change of direction to defend a position.
- ^3 – Lando Norris received a five-second time penalty for speeding in the pit lane. His final position was not affected by the penalty.

== Championship standings after the race ==
Drivers' Championship standings

Pos.	Driver	Points
1	(Netherlands) Max Verstappen	175
2	(Mexico) Sergio Pérez	129
3	(Monaco) Charles Leclerc	126
4	(United Kingdom) George Russell	111
5	(Spain) Carlos Sainz Jr.	102

Constructors' Championship standings

Pos.	Constructor	Points
1	(Austria) Red Bull Racing-RBPT	304
2	(Italy) Ferrari	228
3	(Germany) Mercedes	188
4	(United Kingdom) McLaren-Mercedes	65
5	(France) Alpine-Renault	57

- Note: Only the top five positions are included for both sets of standings.

== Notes ==
Previous race: 2022 Azerbaijan Grand Prix	FIA Formula One World Championship; 2022 season	Next race: 2022 British Grand Prix
Previous race: 2019 Canadian Grand Prix	Canadian Grand Prix	Next race: 2023 Canadian Grand Prix
