= University Hospitals Coventry and Warwickshire NHS Trust =

NHS hospital trust

- Type: NHS trust
- Established: 2006
- Headquarters: Clifford Bridge Road, Coventry
- Population: 1.7 million
- Hospitals: University Hospital Coventry; Hospital of St Cross, Rugby
- Chair: Sue Noyes
- Chief executive: Prof Andy Hardy
- Staff: 10,000+
- Website: www.uhcw.nhs.uk

University Hospitals Coventry and Warwickshire NHS Trust (UHCW) runs University Hospital Coventry and the Hospital of St Cross situated in Rugby, Warwickshire. The trust works in partnership with the University of Warwick's Warwick Medical School.

== Development ==
The trust was one of five to benefit from a five-year, £12.5 million programme announced by Jeremy Hunt in July 2015 to bring in Virginia Mason Medical Center to assist English using their clinical engagement and culture tools including the Patient Safety Alert System and electronic dashboard. Hunt said "The achievements at Virginia Mason over the past decade are truly inspirational and I’m delighted they will now help NHS staff to learn the lessons that made their hospital one of the safest in the world – patients will see real benefits as a result."

== Research and teaching ==
The University Hospitals Coventry and Warwickshire NHS Trust works in partnership with the University of Warwick's Warwick Medical School on particular research themes and areas of clinical research as well as providing training and education for postgraduates.

Dr Raj Mattu, a consultant cardiologist was dismissed by the Trust in 2010. In 2001, he had exposed the cases of two patients who had died in crowded bays at Walsgrave Hospital in Coventry. In April 2014 an Employment Tribunal found "did not cause or contribute to his dismissal" and had been subject to "many detriments" by the trust as a consequence of being a Whistleblower. He submitted a claim for damages of more than £6.5 million. Two locum consultants had to be hired cover his position. An independent £500,000 QC-led inquiry recommended in 2007 that Dr Mattu should be allowed to return to work. In 2016, he was awarded compensation of £1.2 million. The judge found that he had done nothing to "cause or contribute" to his dismissal and he had been "unfavourably" treated by the trust.

== Performance ==
The trust keeps unusually high-quality performance data and uses the VitalPac observations system, the Datix incident reporting tool and Allocate's HealthRoster staffing software. This formed the basis of a study, led by Alison Leary, professor and chair of healthcare and workforce modelling at London South Bank University along with colleagues Dr Rob Cook Wolfram and Dr Sarahjane Jones Birmingham City University at which demonstrated a significant relationship between the number of nurses on duty in hospitals and 40 indicators of patient care and outcomes. These included slips, trips, and falls, sickness, blood pressure, respiratory rate and temperature. The study, commissioned by Jane Cummings of NHS England was leaked shortly after the National Institute for Health and Care Excellence abandoned its work on safe staffing in hospitals.

It was the first large teaching trust in England to have eliminated two-year waits for elective care in 2022.

In 2019, the trust announced that it was dispensing with the blood courier services of Warwickshire and Solihull Blood Bikes, and their services would be replaced by a commercial contract with QE Facilities Limited, a subsidiary company of Gateshead Health NHS Foundation Trust.

== Incidents ==
In 2023, the temozolomide overprescription incident was discovered when Ian Brown, a consultant clinical oncologist, retired and his patient's care was taken over by new consultants. It was found that Brown had been prescribing temozolomide to cancer patients for much longer than the NHS recommended guideline of six months.

== See also ==
- Healthcare in West Midlands
- List of NHS trusts
