= The Meriden Hospital =

- Circle Health
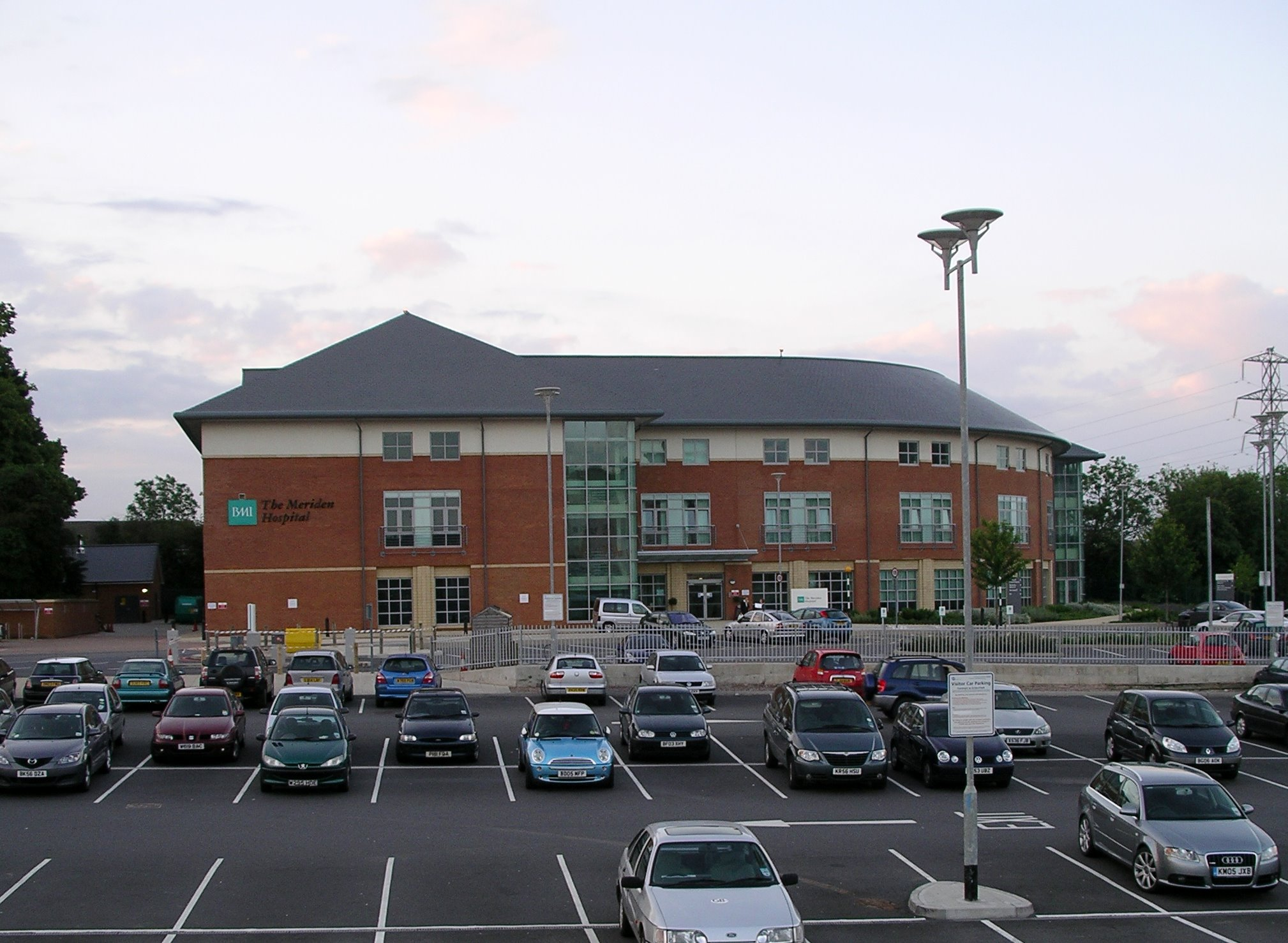
- The Meriden Hospital

- Shown in West Midlands

Geography
- Location: Walsgrave; Coventry, West Midlands, England
- Coordinates: 52.4233°N 1.4383°W

Organisation
- Care system: Private
- Type: General

Services
- Emergency department: No

The Meriden Hospital is a private hospital run by Circle Health. It is situated adjacent to the University Hospital Coventry, Walsgrave, Coventry, England.

== History ==
The hospital, which was designed to have 48 beds and was built at a cost of £25 million, opened in February 2006. In April 2013 it was accused of instructing doctors to delay NHS operations to encourage patients to go private instead.

== See also ==
- List of hospitals in England
