= Coventry and Warwickshire Hospital =

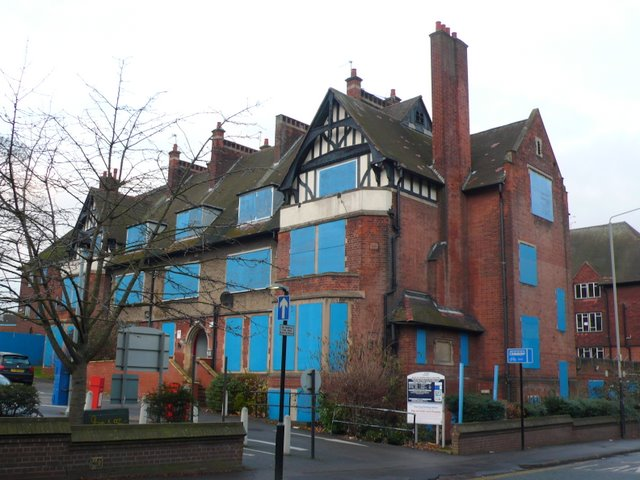
- One of the hospital buildings derelict in 2010; this has since been converted into student accommodation.

Geography
- Location: Stoney Stanton Road, Coventry, West Midlands, England
- Coordinates: 52°24′46.5″N 1°30′26.3″W

Organisation
- Care system: NHS (from 1948)
- Type: General

History
- Founded: 1867
- Closed: 2006

Links
- Lists: Hospitals in England

The Coventry and Warwickshire Hospital was a former hospital in Coventry, England, on Stoney Stanton Road on the northern edge of the city centre. The hospital was opened in 1867 and closed in 2006, to be replaced by the new University Hospital Coventry sited about 4 miles (6.4 km) north east of the centre.

== History ==
The hospital replaced a small hospital on Little Park Street which had opened in 1840. It employed three doctors for 12 beds in one ward. It became clear that this was not sufficient for the growing city, and in the 1860s fundraising began for a new purpose built general hospital. Construction began in 1864, and it was opened in 1867.

The hospital sustained extensive damage during the Coventry Blitz in the Second World War. During the large raid of 14 November 1940, the hospital took several direct hits, but no staff or patients were killed, and the hospital treated many of the injured. Much greater damage occurred during the large raid of 8 April 1941; the hospital suffered ten direct hits, which killed 21 patients, two doctors, seven nurses, and three St John Ambulance Brigade stretcher-bearers. All of the hospital's windows were shattered, and several buildings were ruined.

The hospital joined the National Health Service in 1948; until then it had been a voluntary institution. The hospital grew, and new buildings were added but its city centre site left it with little space to expand. In the 1960s a new hospital, Walsgrave Hospital, was built on the edge of the city and upon its opening in 1970, Coventry and Warwickshire Hospital ceased to be the city's main hospital. It retained outpatient services, the accident and emergency, ophthalmology, and orthopaedics departments, and provided laboratory services to both sites

The division of Coventry's medical services between two hospitals caused operational problems; in 2002 a private finance initiative contract was signed to build a new 'super hospital' on the site of Walsgrave Hospital to replace both that and Coventry and Warwickshire Hospital. Upon its opening in July 2006, both of the older hospitals closed.

After the closure of the hospital the post-war buildings were demolished and the site was used as a car park. However, the former nurses’ home and outpatients department, which were listed buildings and dated from 1908 and 1909 respectively, were left standing. They remained empty and derelict for 13 years. In 2015 plans were submitted to convert these buildings into student accommodation, work on which began in 2019.
