= University Hospital Coventry =

Hospital in Coventry, West Midlands, England

- University Hospitals Coventry and Warwickshire NHS Trust
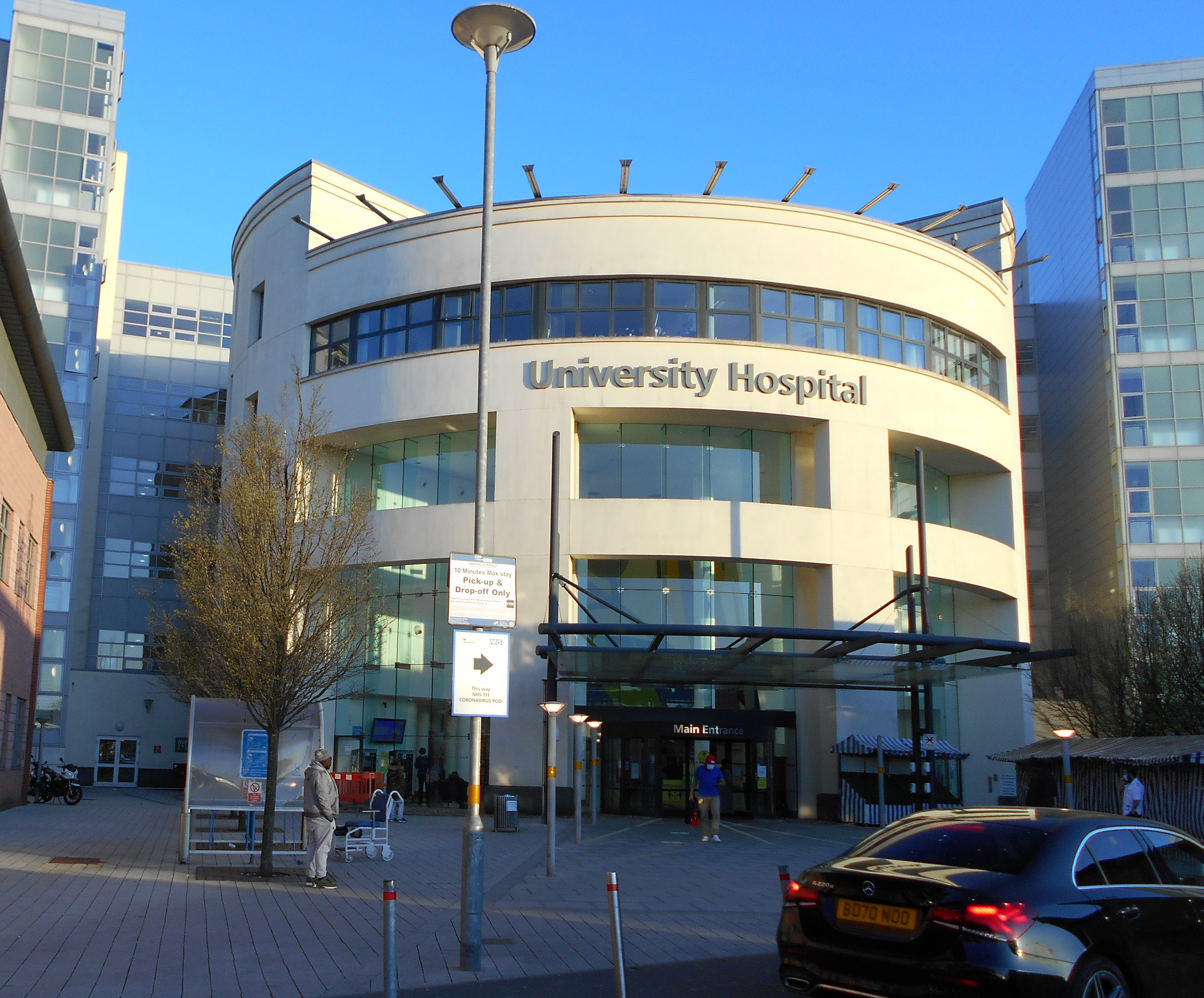
- The main entrance

Geography
- Location: Clifford Bridge Road, Coventry, England
- Coordinates: 52.4212°N 1.4378°W

Organisation
- Care system: NHS
- Type: General
- Affiliated university: University of Warwick

Services
- Emergency department: Major Trauma Centre
- Beds: 1,064

Helipads
- Helipad: Yes
Number	Length		Surface
Number	ft	m	Surface
H1	46	14	Paved

History
- Constructed: July 2002
- Opened: 10 July 2006

Links
- Website: uhcw.nhs.uk
- Lists: Hospitals in England

University Hospital Coventry is a large National Health Service (NHS) hospital situated in the Walsgrave on Sowe area of Coventry, West Midlands, England, 4 miles (6 km) north-east of the city centre. It is part of the University Hospitals Coventry and Warwickshire NHS Trust (UHCW), and is the principal hospital serving Coventry and Rugby, providing a wide range of services. It works in partnership with the University of Warwick's Warwick Medical School. It has a large, progressive accident & emergency department providing a trauma service to Coventry and Warwickshire.

The hospital was opened in 2006 as a 1,250 bed 'super hospital', replacing the previous Walsgrave Hospital on the same site, and the city-centre Coventry and Warwickshire Hospital.

== History ==
=== Walsgrave Hospital ===
The original hospital on the site, known as Walsgrave Hospital, was mostly constructed in the 1960s, with work beginning in 1963, It had four major units; they were the Maternity Unit, the Geriatric Unit, the General Unit, which had a number of specialist departments and ten operating theatres, and the Psychiatric Unit. It was opened in stages: the maternity unit opened in 1966, the general unit opened in 1969 and the psychiatric unit opened in 1973.

Medical services in Coventry were split between Walsgrave Hospital and the older Coventry and Warwickshire Hospital in the city-centre, which caused operational difficulties; the separation of accident and emergency from the main hospital services was considered especially problematic. Accordingly, in 1992 plans were announced to close the Coventry and Warwickshire Hospital, and move all medical services to a single site, however it would take another decade before this came to fruition.

=== Current hospital ===
The Walsgrave, and Coventry and Warwickshire Hospitals were replaced by a new 'super hospital' at the Walsgrave site which was procured under a private finance initiative (PFI) contract in 2002. The new hospital was designed by Nightingale Associates and built by Skanska at a cost of £440 million. Construction started in July 2002 and it was opened on 10 July 2006, and the two older hospitals it replaced were closed at the same time. Skanska subsequently sold its stake to Innisfree for £66 million. Demolition of the old Walsgrave Hospital began in late 2006, and was completed in 2008, with the hospital car park now covering its site.

The new hospital created several controversies: The decision to close the city-centre Coventry and Warwickshire Hospital, which was easily accessible by public transport, and move all of the city's medical services to a site on the eastern edge of the city, was controversial with people who lived on the other side of Coventry. Supporters of the hospital however argued in favour of having all of the services under one roof. Another controversy was the long term cost of the private finance initiative (pfi) deal to build the hospital: In 2019 it was revealed that University Hospitals Coventry and Warwickshire NHS Trust paid 12.5% of their income per year to the contractor, and that by the end of the contract, they would have spent an estimated £3.7 billion, almost ten times the original capital expenditure of £379 million. However, HM Treasury published a full list of PFI contracts in March 2015: this showed that the total unitary payments over the life of the contract would be £3.7 billion i.e. not just covering debt interest and repayments but also including estate management, cleaning, catering, security, electricity, water etc.

As of 2020, the hospital was equipped with 1,064 beds and 26 operating theatres. On 26 March 2012, the hospital was designated as one of four trauma units in the West Midlands Region. In 2012, the planning committee approved an application to build a new car park at the hospital, to help improve ongoing congestion and traffic issues.

The trust was one of 26 responsible for half of the national growth in patients waiting more than four hours in accident and emergency over the 2014/5 winter.

On 8 December 2020, the UK's COVID-19 vaccination programme began at the hospital, when Margaret Keenan became the first person in the world to receive a COVID-19 vaccine outside of trial conditions. In 2024, it ran tests on a machine named Aura-10 which scans cancer surgery results in real time.

== Performance ==
It was named by the Health Service Journal as one of the top hundred NHS trusts to work for in 2015. At that time it had 6198 full-time equivalent staff and a sickness absence rate of 3.99%. 70% of staff recommend it as a place for treatment and 64% recommended it as a place to work.

In January 2023 it was revealed that only 59% of A&E patients at the hospital were seen within four hours, below the average in England (65%), and significantly below the target set by the NHS of 95% of patients being seen within this time.

In 2023 the Care Quality Commission rated the hospital as "good" overall, but noted that neurosurgery needed improvement.

== Coventry Hospital Radio ==
The hospital plays host to Coventry Hospital Radio, a free station provided through the Hospedia bedside units and now online via their website. The station is situated on the 5th floor and is available to all wards and online via the website providing music, entertainment and chat 24 hours a day, 7 days a week.

In 2019, Coventry Hospital Radio was shortlisted for three National HBA Radio Awards. Radio presenter, Dan Sambell, won a Gold award for "Best Male Presenter" and husband and wife team Colin and Annette Gutteridge were awarded Bronze for Programme With Multiple Presenters.

== The Meriden Hospital ==
The Meriden Hospital is a private hospital run by BMI Healthcare. It is opposite the NHS hospital in the hospital complex.

== Myton Hospice ==
Also within the hospital complex, adjacent to the NHS hospital is Coventry Myton Hospice which was opened in 2009. This is not an NHS facility, but is funded mostly by charitable donations.

== Transport ==
There are connections to a variety of areas across Coventry and other towns including bus services to Nuneaton, Bedworth and Rugby St Cross Hospital. The first line of the planned Coventry Very Light Rail system is proposed to run from University Hospital Coventry to Coventry railway station.

== Gallery ==
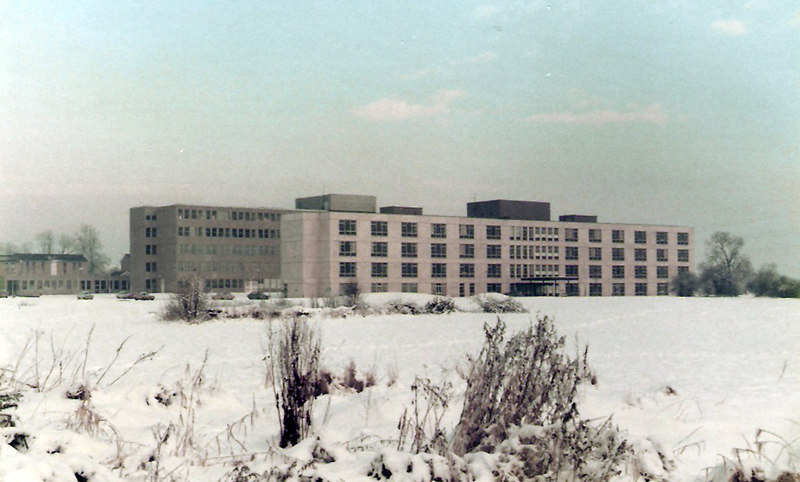
Walsgrave Hospital in 1978

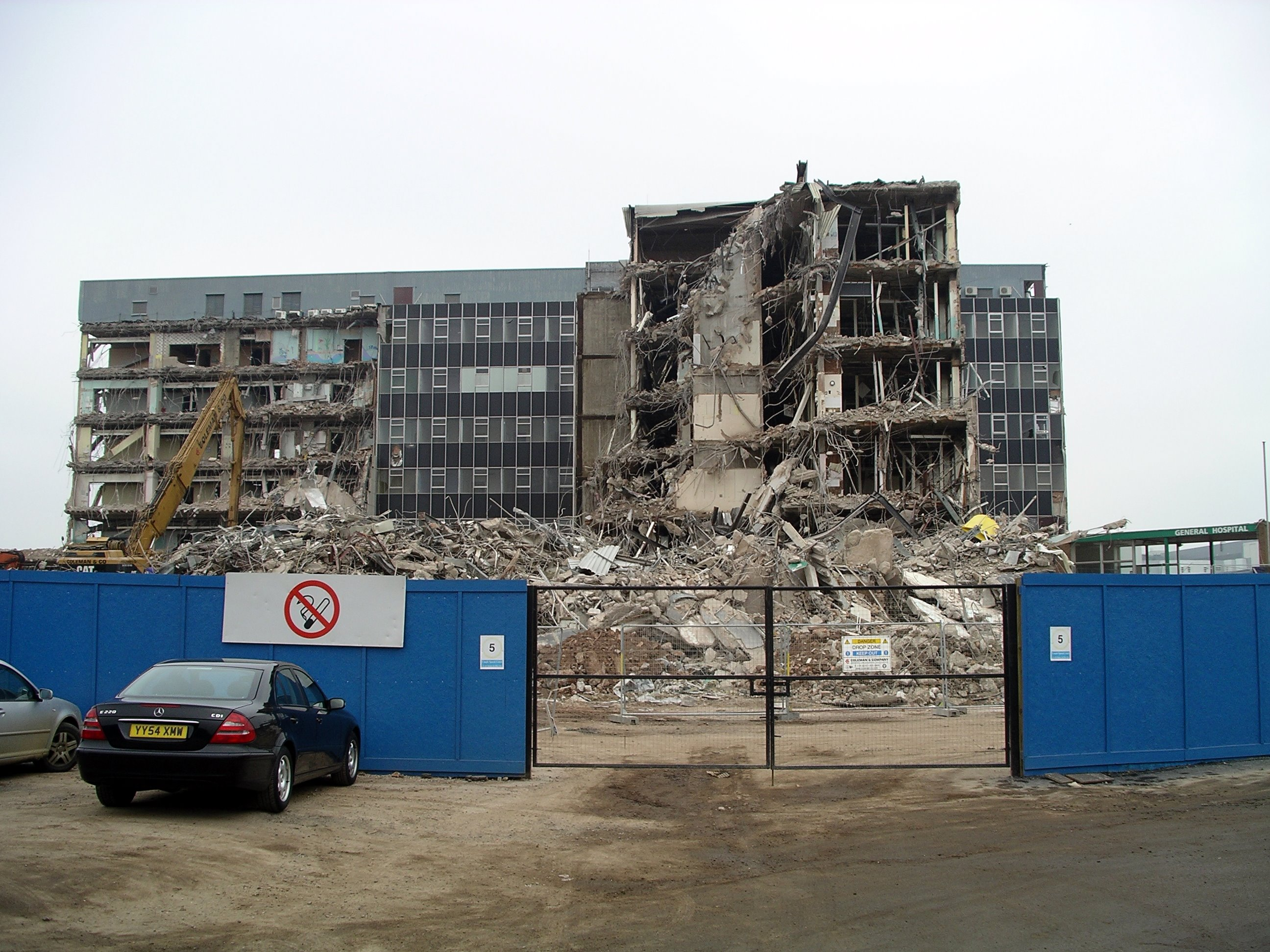
The old Walsgrave Hospital during demolition on 1 February 2007

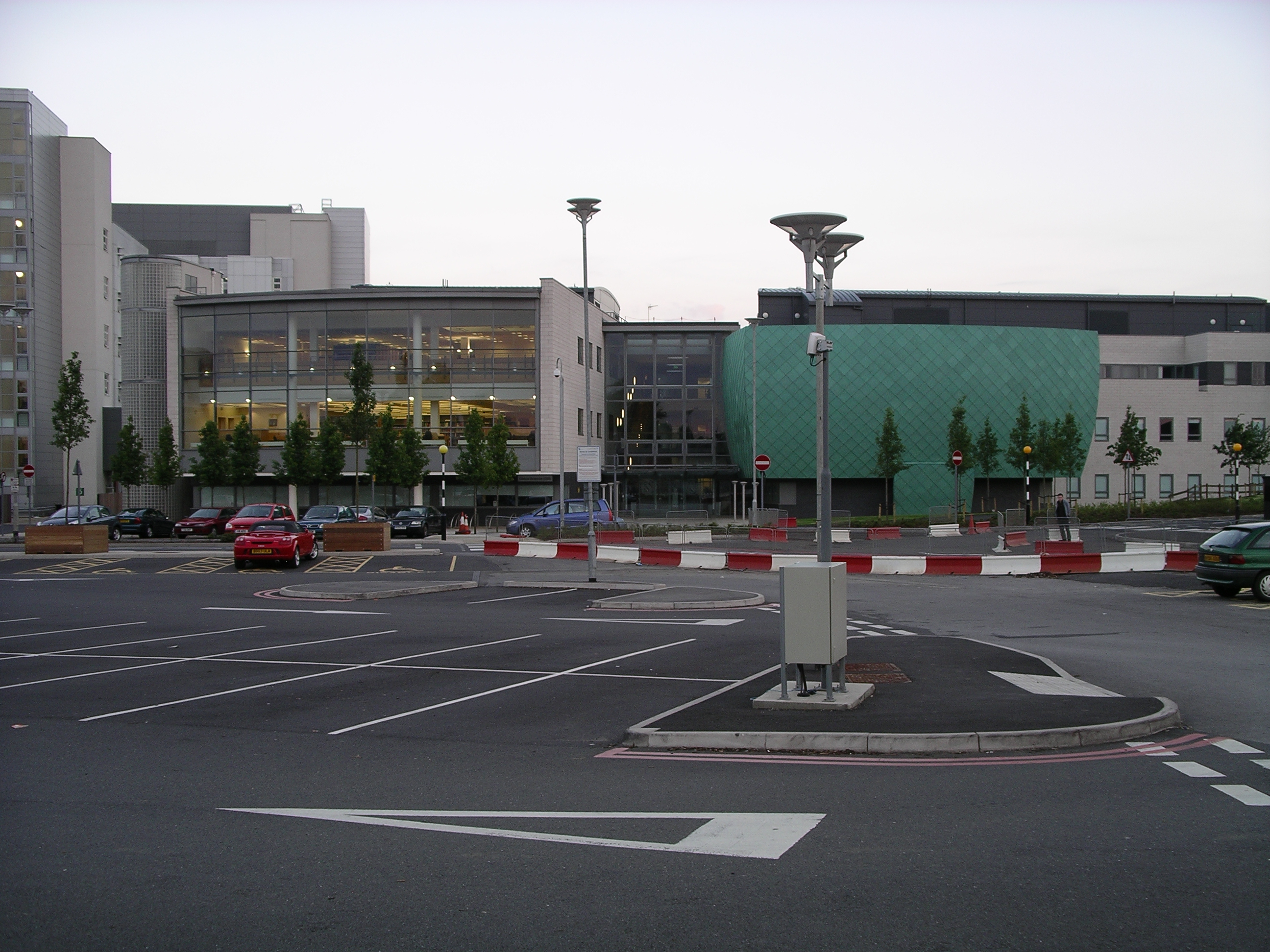
The Clinical Sciences Building, University Hospital Coventry

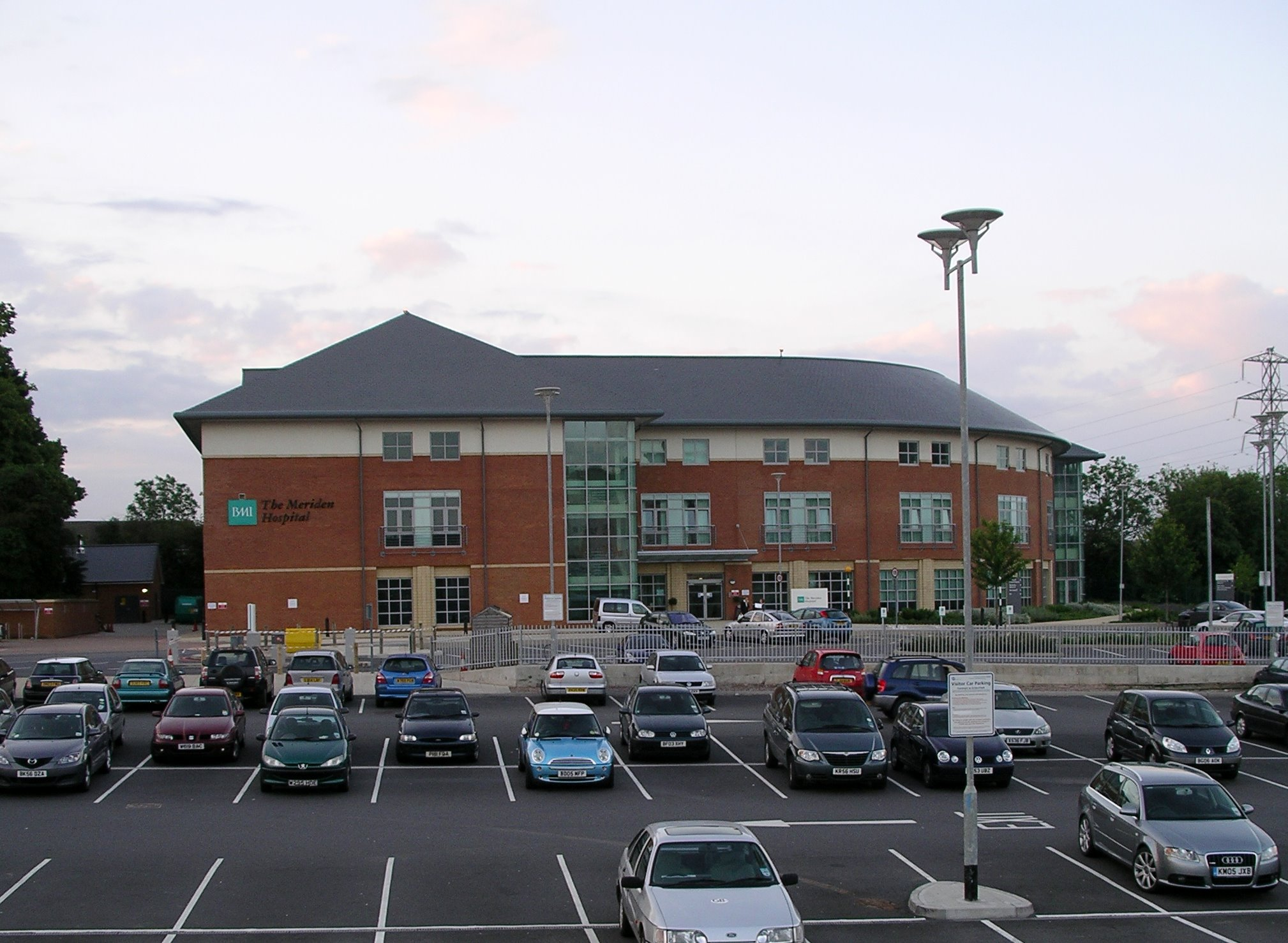
The BMI Meriden Hospital (private hospital)

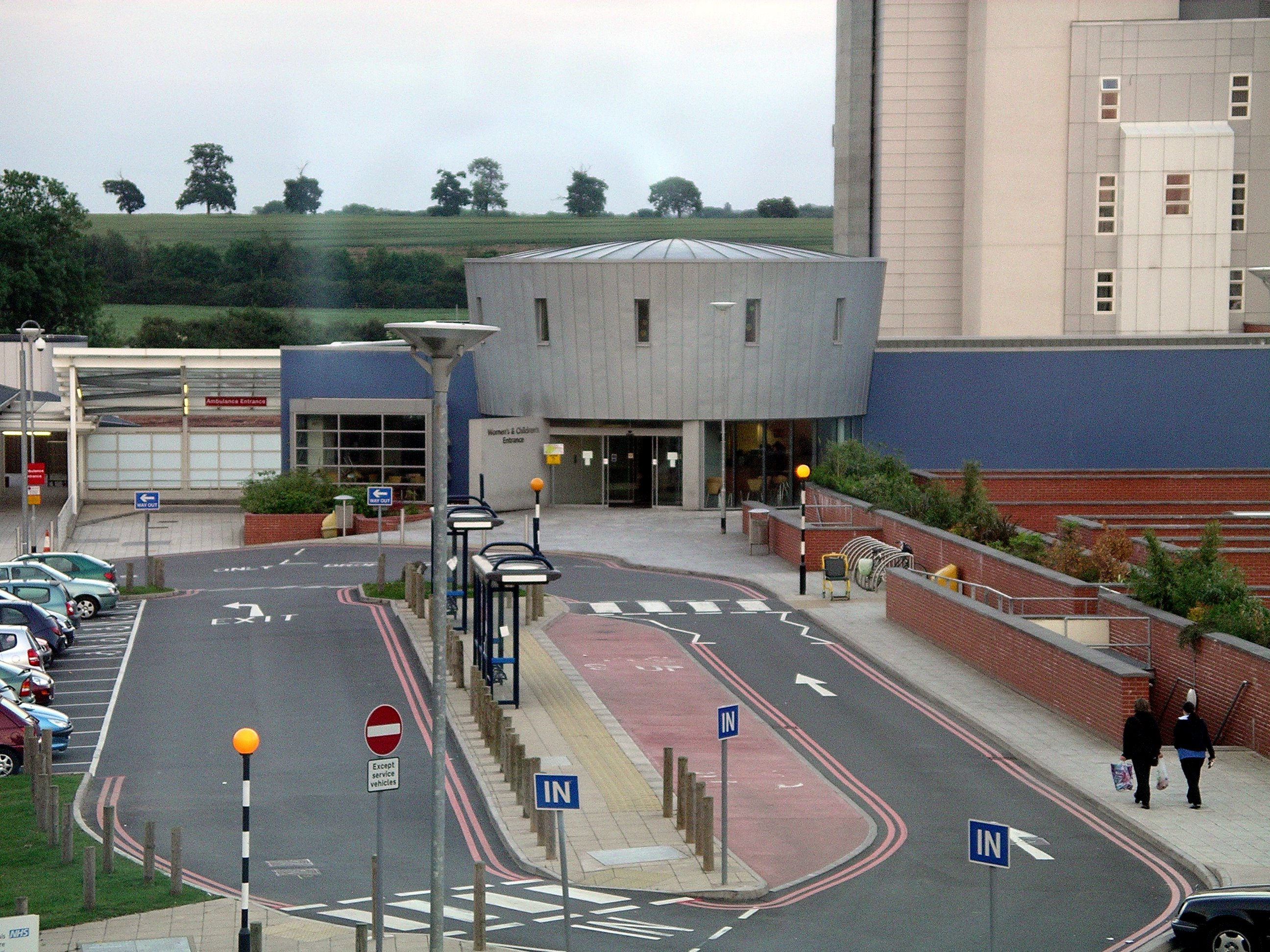
The women's and children's hospital entrance

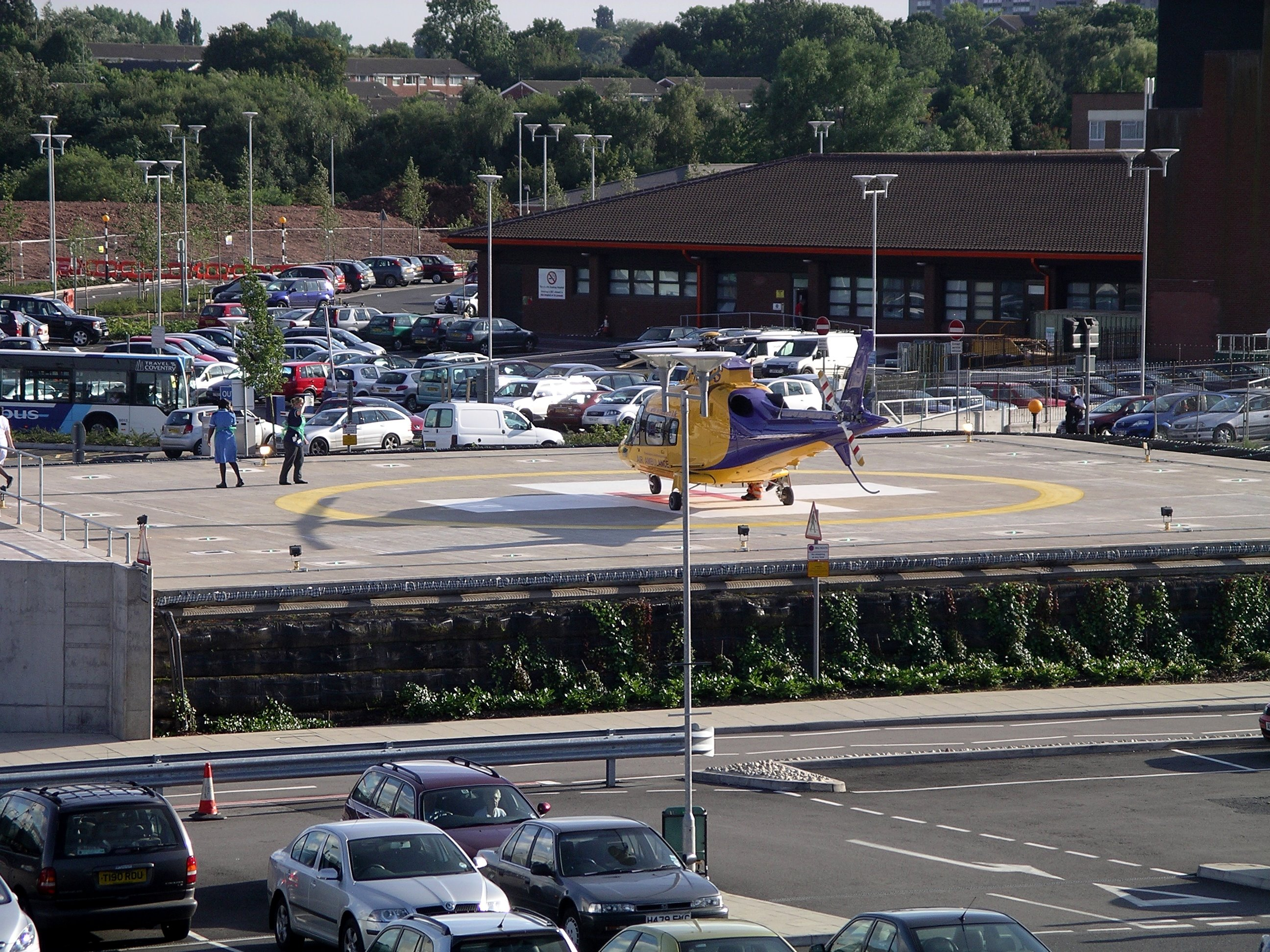
An air ambulance on the helipad

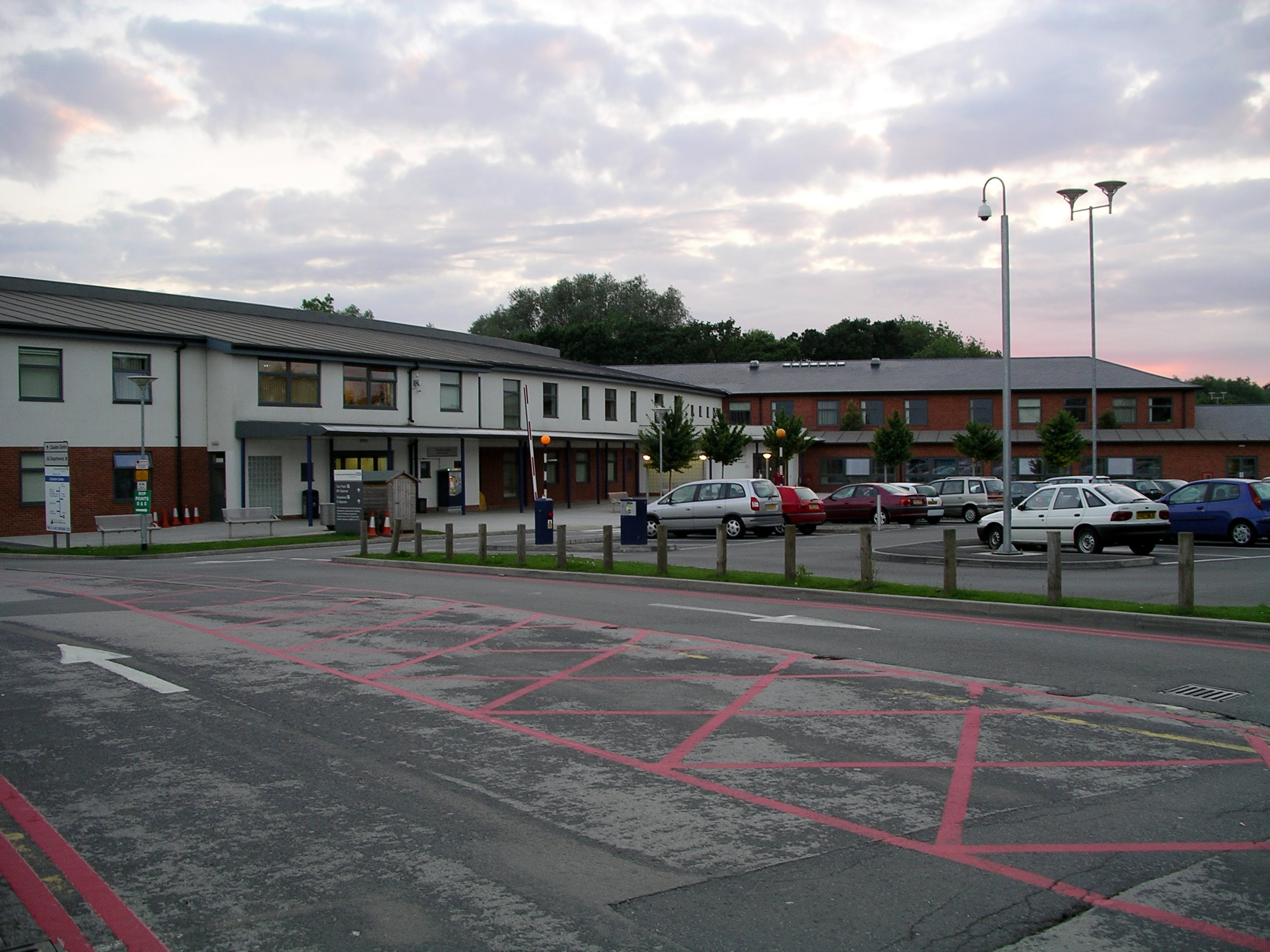
The new Caludon Centre

== See also ==
- Hospital of St Cross, Rugby
- Coventry and Warwickshire Hospital
- University of Warwick
- List of hospitals in England
