= Staffing software =

Staffing software is a classification of line-of-business software solutions for temporary staffing agencies, such as Adecco, Manpower, Inc., and Randstad. Staffing software is different from talent management software, as talent management software is used by corporate HR departments as opposed to third-party placement firms. Typically, staffing software is a combination of an Applicant Tracking System or Customer Relationship Management system and Job Posting, Human Resource Management, payroll and/or accounting functions. Most staffing software products are front-office-based applications used for the management and placement of people on temporary work assignments.

Staffing software also differs from other HR software because of the temporary nature of job orders handled. A key entity in staffing software is assignment, which links the job candidate to the job order and stipulates the bill and pay rates involved. Staffing software is a unified platform that combines tools like ATS (Applicant Tracking System), CRM (Customer Relationship Management), payroll, onboarding, and workforce management into a single system. It eliminates the need for multiple tools, simplifies processes, reduces costs, and improves overall staffing efficiency.

Each week, active assignment records are used to create transaction entries against which a number of hours worked by the candidate on the job order is entered. These transaction data are then used to create a paycheck and invoice as well as accommodating ancillary financial data such as mileage, equipment and parking, any of which may or may be paid or charged to the candidate or similarly billed to the client.

Staffing software systems also mirror many of the functions in Vendor Management Software (VMS) such as distributing job orders out to subcontractors, controlling overall spend and managing the quality of worker by third-party vendor. The ability to offer these features to end-clients without having to roll out separate VMS software saves money and time for both the end-client and the staffing company. Critics of staffing-software integrated VMS argue that such functions should be 'vendor neutral' and that only independent VMS offerings can maintain that neutrality.
