= Anna Baillie =

British nurse (1864–1958)

Anna Beatrix Baillie RRC
- Born: 1864
- Died: 21 August 1958 (aged 93–94)
- Occupation: Nursing Leader

Anna Beatrix Ballie R.R.C. (1864–1958), was an inspiring manager who established the first provincial Preliminary Training School for Nurses, and served as a Principal military Matron of Bristol during the First World War. She was one of the first supporters and promoters of the College of Nursing (later the Royal College of Nursing).

== Early life ==
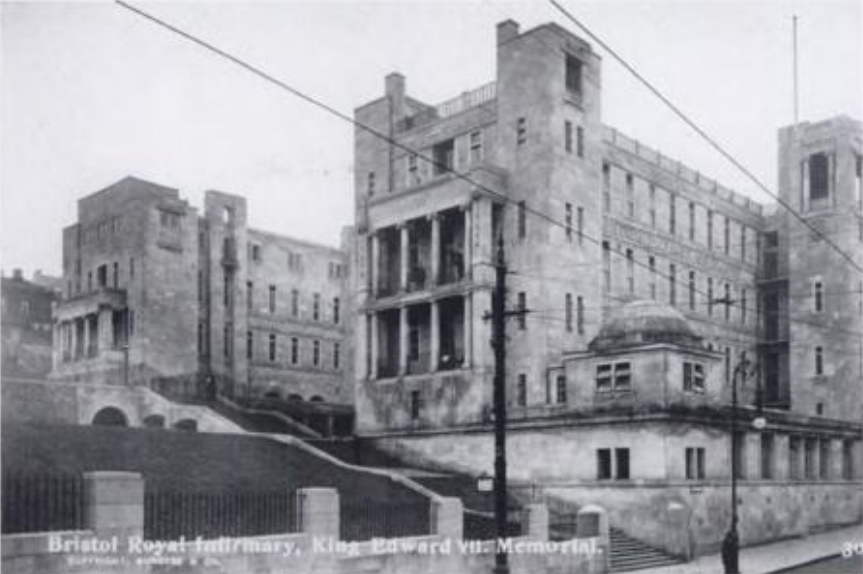
Bristol Royal Infirmary extension

Baillie was born in the Plomsegate registration district in Suffolk in 1864. She was the eldest of at least ten children born to her father William and mother Anna. From 1871, Anna's father ran a drapery business in Harleston, Suffolk. Anna was working as an assistant in the family business by the time she was 16 years old.

== Early career ==
Later in the 1880s Baillie worked at Gloucester Infirmary for 22 months. In 1888 she became a paying probationer for three months at The London Hospital under Eva Luckes. From September 1890, she became a full-time probationer at The London for two years. She was promoted rapidly and in November 1892, just two months after she had successfully completed her nurse training, Baillie was appointed as a ward sister.

== Matronships ==
Baillie was appointed as Matron of The Hospital of St Cross, Rugby, Warwickshire in 1896. After two years as matron in Rugby, Baillie was appointed as matron of the Bristol Royal Infirmary, Gloucestershire in 1898. She remained there for 25 years until October 1923. Whilst she was matron she oversaw the building of a new nurses home and updated the nurses training. In 1908 she was the first matron of a provincial hospital to introduce a Preliminary Training School for Nurses in England. After her retirement from Bristol Royal Infirmary Baillie became matron of St. Monica’s Home of Rest at Westbury-on-Trym, near Bristol.

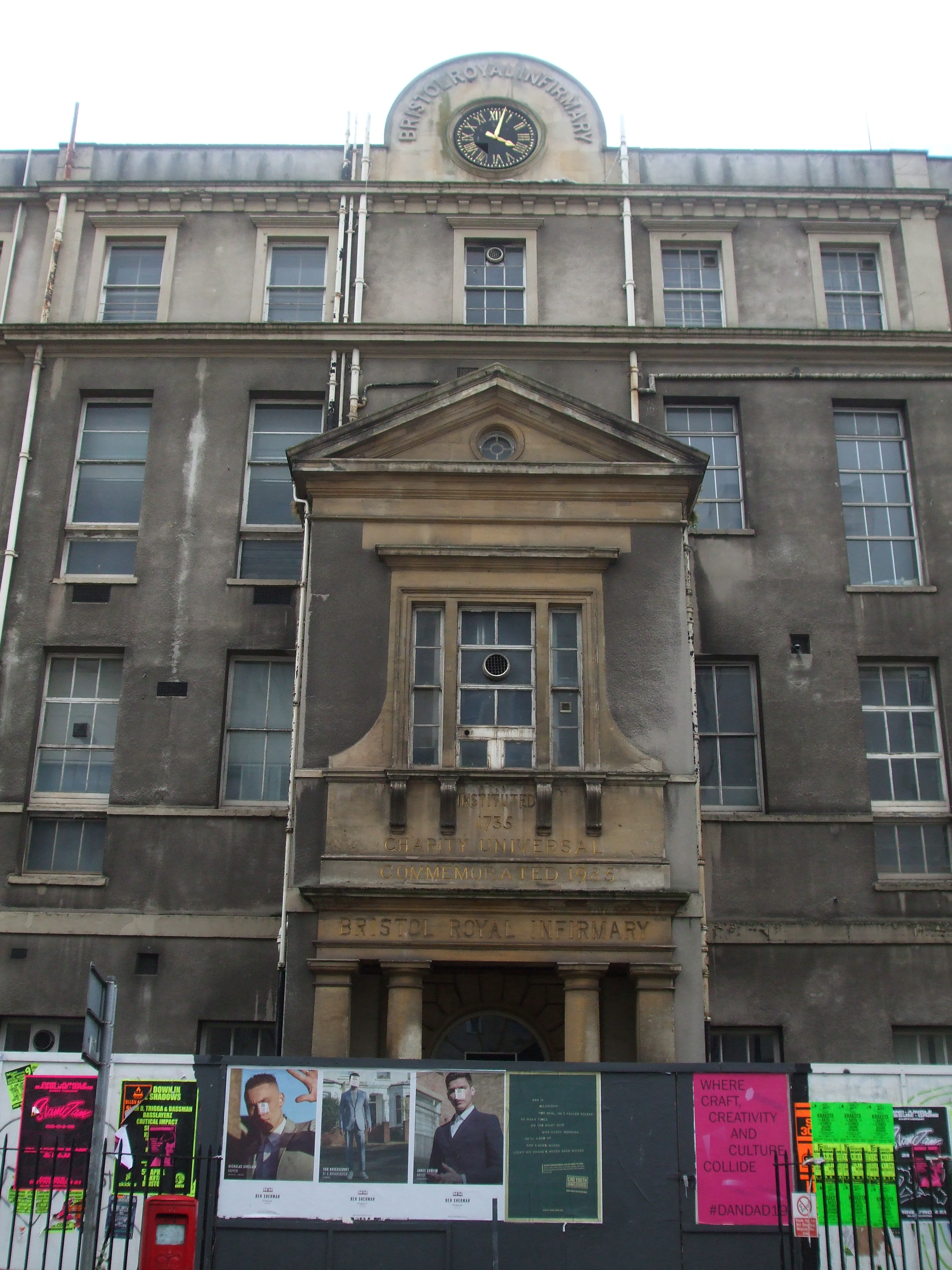
Bristol Royal Infirmary

== Military service ==
As part of the preparedness in the event of a large scale military conflict, Baillie was appointed in 1909 as organising matron of the local General Territorial Hospitals. Baillie was Principal Matron Territorial Force Nursing Service 2nd Southern General Hospital (BRI and Southmead Hospitals), for the duration of the First World War, 1914–1919.

== Professional activity ==
During the First World War, Baillie became one of the first supporters and promoters of the College of Nursing (now Royal College of Nursing). In March 1916, she was appointed to their first Council, she remained a Council member until her term ended in 1918.

== Honours ==
In 1916, Baillie and Agnes Watt, a fellow Londoner and matron of the Radcliffe Infirmary received the Royal Red Cross at Buckingham Palace.

== Retirement ==
Baillie died twenty years after she retired on 21 August 1958 in St. Monica’s Home of Rest at Westbury-on-Trym, where she had previously been matron.
