= 2021 United States Grand Prix =

17th round of the 2021 Formula One season

Race 17 of 22 in the 2021 Formula One World Championship
← Previous race	Next race →
- Layout of the Circuit of the Americas

Race details
- Date: October 24, 2021
- Official name: Formula 1 Aramco United States Grand Prix 2021
- Location: Circuit of the Americas, Austin, Texas
- Course: Permanent racing facility
- Course length: 5.513 km (3.426 miles)
- Distance: 56 laps, 308.405 km (191.634 miles)
- Weather: Sunny
- Attendance: 400,000

Pole position
Driver	(Netherlands) Max Verstappen	Red Bull Racing-Honda
- Time: 1:32.910

Fastest lap
Driver	(United Kingdom) Lewis Hamilton	Mercedes
- Time: 1:38.485 on lap 41

Podium
First	(Netherlands) Max Verstappen	Red Bull Racing-Honda
Second	(United Kingdom) Lewis Hamilton	Mercedes
Third	(Mexico) Sergio Pérez	Red Bull Racing-Honda

The 2021 United States Grand Prix (officially known as the Formula 1 Aramco United States Grand Prix 2021) was a Formula One motor race, held on October 24, 2021, at the Circuit of the Americas in Austin, Texas, United States. The race was the 17th round of the 2021 Formula One World Championship and the 50th running of the United States Grand Prix, the 42nd time the race was run as a World Championship event since the inaugural 1950 season, and the ninth time a World Championship round was held at the venue.

== Background ==
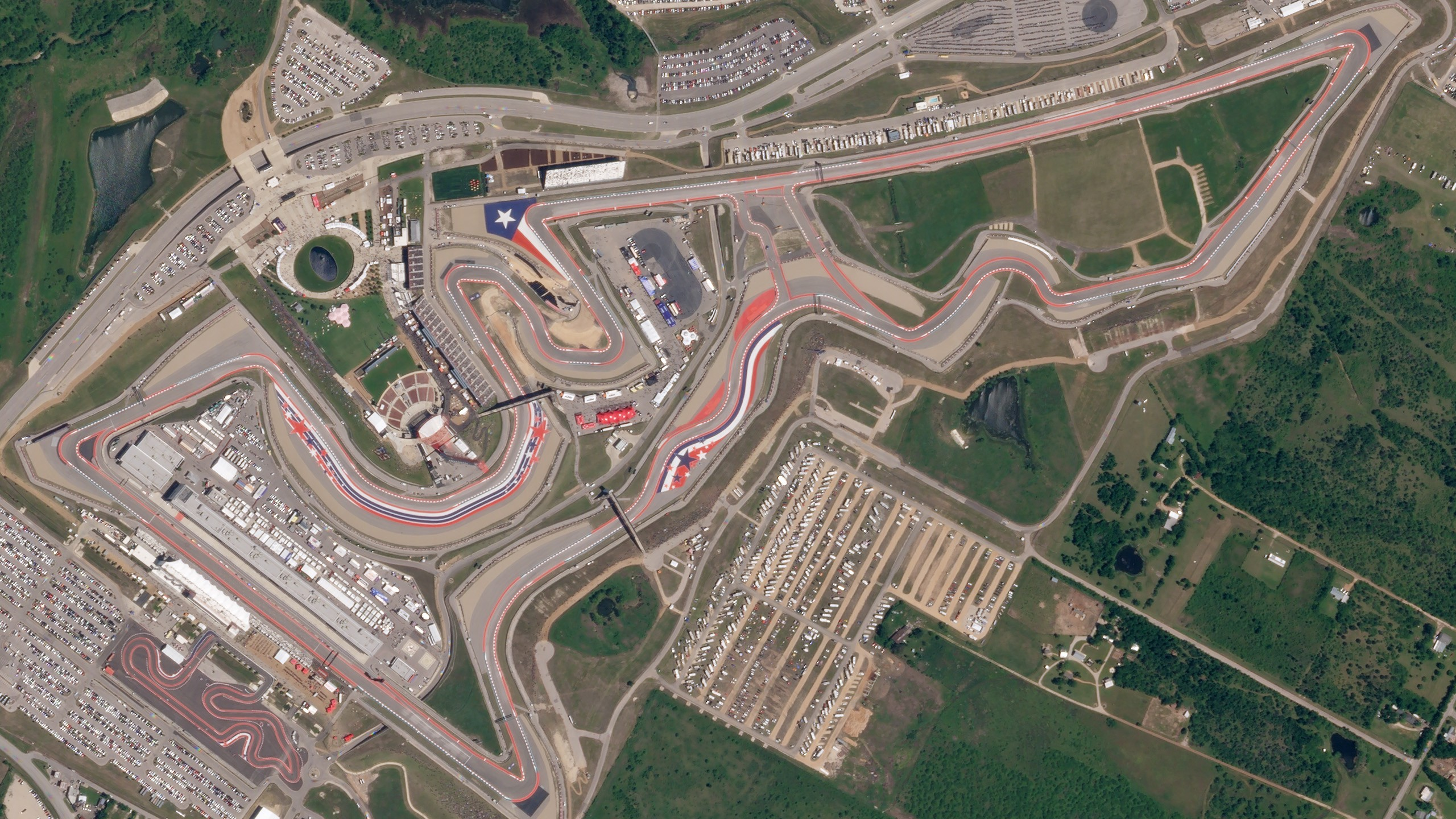
Aerial view of Circuit of the Americas.

The race returned after being cancelled in 2020 due to the COVID-19 pandemic. There was a 20% risk of rain for qualifying and 40% for the race. From this race onward, any practice times set during waved yellow flags would be deleted. The final two rounds of the 2021 W Series were held as support races for the Grand Prix. This was the ninth time that Austin has hosted a Formula One Grand Prix. Some restrictions on paddock access related to the COVID-19 pandemic were lowered starting from this event. 400,000 spectators attended the event across the three days.

=== Championship standings before the race ===
After finishing second in the preceding Turkish Grand Prix, Max Verstappen led the drivers' championship from Lewis Hamilton by six points, Verstappen with 262.5 and Hamilton with 256.5. Behind them, Valtteri Bottas was in third place with 177 points. Lando Norris trailed him by 32 points, and Sergio Pérez trailed Norris by 10 points. In the constructors' championship, Mercedes led Red Bull Racing by 36 points. Behind them, third-placed McLaren led fourth-placed Ferrari by 7.5 points with 240 points, with Alpine a distant fifth with 104 points.

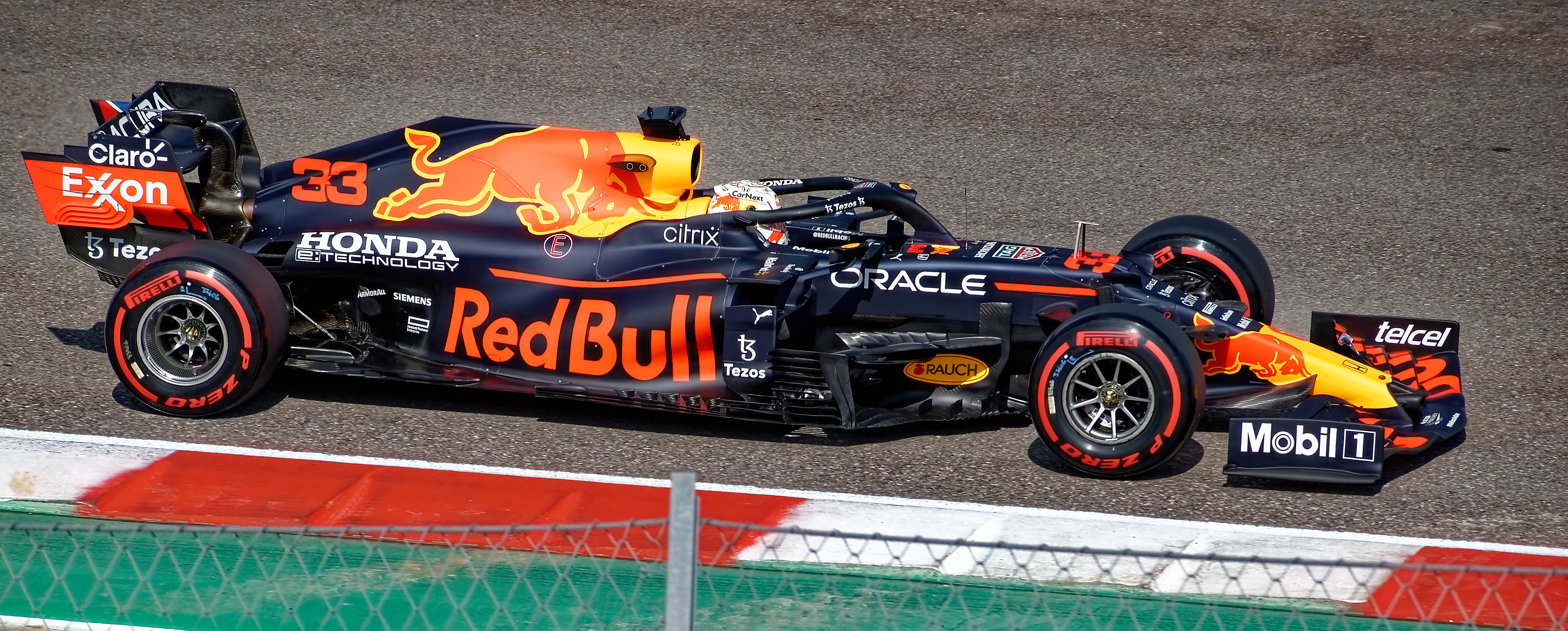
Verstappen, the race winner, during Friday's free practice.

=== Entrants ===
The drivers and teams were the same as the season entry list with no additional stand-in drivers for the race.

The title sponsor of Ferrari, Mission Winnow, returned for this race. The name and sponsor logos were used by Ferrari at the Bahrain, Emilia Romagna, Portuguese, Spanish, Monaco, Azerbaijan, and Russian Grands Prix, but were not used in any races from the French Grand Prix to the Italian Grand Prix, and the Turkish Grand Prix, for legal reasons. For this weekend exclusively, Honda-powered teams Red Bull Racing and Scuderia AlphaTauri raced with sponsorship by Honda's American brand Acura, replacing the engine manufacturer's logos in their cars' respective liveries.

=== Tyre choices ===
Sole tyre supplier Pirelli allocated the C2, C3, and C4 compounds of tyre to be used in the race.

== Practice ==
The first practice session started at 11:30 local time (UTC−05:00) on Friday, October 22. Valtteri Bottas was the fastest in the session, with Lewis Hamilton and Max Verstappen behind. The second session started at 15:00 local time, also on Friday, and ended with Sergio Pérez fastest ahead of Lando Norris and Hamilton. The third practice session started at 13:00 local time on Saturday, October 23. There were very stiff winds and high temperatures catching the drivers out throughout the session and Verstappen and Hamilton both had quicker lap times deleted for exceeding track limits on Turns 19 and 9, respectively, Pérez was once again the fastest driver, ahead of Carlos Sainz Jr. for Ferrari and Verstappen.

== Qualifying ==
Qualifying started at 16:00 local time (UTC−05:00) on Saturday, October 23. The surface temperature was around 37 °C (99 °F). Before qualifying, Red Bull made alterations to the rear wings of their cars after a crack was found on one of them. Verstappen qualified on pole. Hamilton qualified second, a fifth of a second slower than Verstappen. Pérez qualified third, while Bottas qualified fourth, although the latter had a five-place grid penalty and was relegated to ninth on the starting grid.

=== Qualifying classification ===
Pos.	No.	Driver	Constructor	Qualifying times			Final grid
Pos.	No.	Driver	Constructor	Q1	Q2	Q3	Final grid
1	33	(Netherlands) Max Verstappen	Red Bull Racing-Honda	1:34.352	1:33.464	1:32.910	1
2	44	(United Kingdom) Lewis Hamilton	Mercedes	1:34.579	1:33.797	1:33.119	2
3	11	(Mexico) Sergio Pérez	Red Bull Racing-Honda	1:34.369	1:34.178	1:33.134	3
4	77	(Finland) Valtteri Bottas	Mercedes	1:34.590	1:33.959	1:33.475	9^{a}
5	16	(Monaco) Charles Leclerc	Ferrari	1:34.153	1:33.928	1:33.606	4
6	55	(Spain) Carlos Sainz Jr.	Ferrari	1:34.558	1:34.126	1:33.792	5
7	3	(Australia) Daniel Ricciardo	McLaren-Mercedes	1:34.407	1:34.643	1:33.808	6
8	4	(United Kingdom) Lando Norris	McLaren-Mercedes	1:34.551	1:33.880	1:33.887	7
9	10	(France) Pierre Gasly	AlphaTauri-Honda	1:34.567	1:34.583	1:34.118	8
10	22	(Japan) Yuki Tsunoda	AlphaTauri-Honda	1:35.360	1:35.137	1:34.918	10
11	31	(France) Esteban Ocon	Alpine-Renault	1:35.747	1:35.377	N/A	11
12	5	(Germany) Sebastian Vettel	Aston Martin-Mercedes	1:35.281	1:35.500	N/A	18^{b}
13	99	(Italy) Antonio Giovinazzi	Alfa Romeo Racing-Ferrari	1:35.920	1:35.794	N/A	12
14	14	(Spain) Fernando Alonso	Alpine-Renault	1:35.756	1:44.549	N/A	19^{c}
15	63	(United Kingdom) George Russell	Williams-Mercedes	1:35.746	No time	N/A	20^{d}
16	18	(Canada) Lance Stroll	Aston Martin-Mercedes	1:35.983	N/A	N/A	13
17	6	(Canada) Nicholas Latifi	Williams-Mercedes	1:35.995	N/A	N/A	14
18	7	(Finland) Kimi Räikkönen	Alfa Romeo Racing-Ferrari	1:36.311	N/A	N/A	15
19	47	(Germany) Mick Schumacher	Haas-Ferrari	1:36.499	N/A	N/A	16
20	9	(Russian Automobile Federation) Nikita Mazepin (Note: Nikita Mazepin is Russian, but he competed as a neutral competitor using the designation RAF (Russian Automobile Federation), as the Court of Arbitration for Sport upheld a ban on Russia competing at World Championships. The ban was implemented by the World Anti-Doping Agency in response to the state-sponsored doping program of Russian athletes.)	Haas-Ferrari	1:36.796	N/A	N/A	17
107% time: 1:40.743

Notes

- ^a – Valtteri Bottas received a five-place grid penalty for a new internal combustion engine.
- ^b – Sebastian Vettel was required to start the race from the back of the grid for exceeding his quota of power unit elements.
- ^c – Fernando Alonso was required to start the race from the back of the grid for exceeding his quota of power unit elements.
- ^d – George Russell was required to start the race from the back of the grid for exceeding his quota of power unit elements.

== Race ==
The race started at 14:00 local time (UTC−05:00) on Sunday, October 24. The race ran for 191.634 miles (308.405 km) over fifty-six laps of the 3.426-mile (5.514 km) circuit under clear skies with an ambient temperature between 81 and 86 °F (27 and 30 °C) and a surface temperature between 97 and 102 °F (36 and 39 °C). There were 140,000 spectators in attendance that day. Hamilton overtook Verstappen at the first corner, with Pérez attempting to pass Hamilton but backing out to avoid risking a collision with his teammate Verstappen. Stroll and Latifi clashed at the first corner, leaving the pair at the back of the field. Ricciardo moved into fifth-place when he overtook Sainz at the sixteenth corner on the first lap. Russell started last, but was in fourteenth place by the end of the first lap. Tsunoda had passed Bottas and Gasly on the first lap, with Gasly then overtaking Bottas on the third lap. Ocon made a pit stop to repair damage at the end of the third lap, dropping him to last place. At the end of the tenth lap Verstappen made a pit stop to change from old medium-compound tyres to new hard-compound tyres. Pérez made a pit stop at the end of the twelfth lap and changed onto another pair of used medium tyres. Red Bull successfully undercut Mercedes when Hamilton stopped from the lead at the end of the thirteenth lap and emerged on the fourteenth lap five-and-a-half seconds behind Verstappen. On the fourteenth lap Gasly retired due to a suspension failure. Verstappen won the race by a margin of one-and-a-third seconds from Hamilton, with third-placed Pérez over forty seconds behind and fourth-placed Leclerc the only other driver within a minute of the two leaders at the end.

=== Race classification ===
Pos.	No.	Driver	Constructor	Laps	Time/Retired	Grid	Points
1	33	(Netherlands) Max Verstappen	Red Bull Racing-Honda	56	1:34:36.552	1	25
2	44	(United Kingdom) Lewis Hamilton	Mercedes	56	+1.333	2	19^{a}
3	11	(Mexico) Sergio Pérez	Red Bull Racing-Honda	56	+42.223	3	15
4	16	(Monaco) Charles Leclerc	Ferrari	56	+52.246	4	12
5	3	(Australia) Daniel Ricciardo	McLaren-Mercedes	56	+1:16.854	6	10
6	77	(Finland) Valtteri Bottas	Mercedes	56	+1:20.128	9	8
7	55	(Spain) Carlos Sainz Jr.	Ferrari	56	+1:23.545	5	6
8	4	(United Kingdom) Lando Norris	McLaren-Mercedes	56	+1:24.395	7	4
9	22	(Japan) Yuki Tsunoda	AlphaTauri-Honda	55	+1 lap	10	2
10	5	(Germany) Sebastian Vettel	Aston Martin-Mercedes	55	+1 lap	18	1
11	99	(Italy) Antonio Giovinazzi	Alfa Romeo Racing-Ferrari	55	+1 lap	12	
12	18	(Canada) Lance Stroll	Aston Martin-Mercedes	55	+1 lap	13	
13	7	(Finland) Kimi Räikkönen	Alfa Romeo Racing-Ferrari	55	+1 lap	15	
14	63	(United Kingdom) George Russell	Williams-Mercedes	55	+1 lap	20	
15	6	(Canada) Nicholas Latifi	Williams-Mercedes	55	+1 lap	14	
16	47	(Germany) Mick Schumacher	Haas-Ferrari	54	+2 laps	16	
17	9	(Russian Automobile Federation) Nikita Mazepin	Haas-Ferrari	54	+2 laps	17	
Ret	14	(Spain) Fernando Alonso	Alpine-Renault	49	Rear wing	19	
Ret	31	(France) Esteban Ocon	Alpine-Renault	40	Mechanical	11	
Ret	10	(France) Pierre Gasly	AlphaTauri-Honda	14	Suspension	8	
Fastest lap: (United Kingdom) Lewis Hamilton (Mercedes) – 1:38.485 (lap 41)

Notes

- ^a – Includes one point for fastest lap.

== Championship standings after the race ==
Drivers' Championship standings

	Pos.	Driver	Points
Unchanged	1	(Netherlands) Max Verstappen*	287.5
Unchanged	2	(United Kingdom) Lewis Hamilton*	275.5
Unchanged	3	(Finland) Valtteri Bottas*	185
1	4	(Mexico) Sergio Pérez	150
1	5	(United Kingdom) Lando Norris	149

Constructors' Championship standings

	Pos.	Constructor	Points
Unchanged	1	(Germany) Mercedes*	460.5
Unchanged	2	(Austria) Red Bull Racing-Honda*	437.5
Unchanged	3	(United Kingdom) McLaren-Mercedes*	254
Unchanged	4	(Italy) Ferrari*	250.5
Unchanged	5	(France) Alpine-Renault	104

- Note: Only the top five positions are included for both sets of standings.
- Bold text and an asterisk indicates competitors who still had a theoretical chance of becoming World Champion.

== See also ==
- 2021 W Series Austin round

== Notes ==
Previous race: 2021 Turkish Grand Prix	FIA Formula One World Championship; 2021 season	Next race: 2021 Mexico City Grand Prix
Previous race: 2019 United States Grand Prix	United States Grand Prix	Next race: 2022 United States Grand Prix
