= Mick Schumacher =

German racing driver (born 1999)

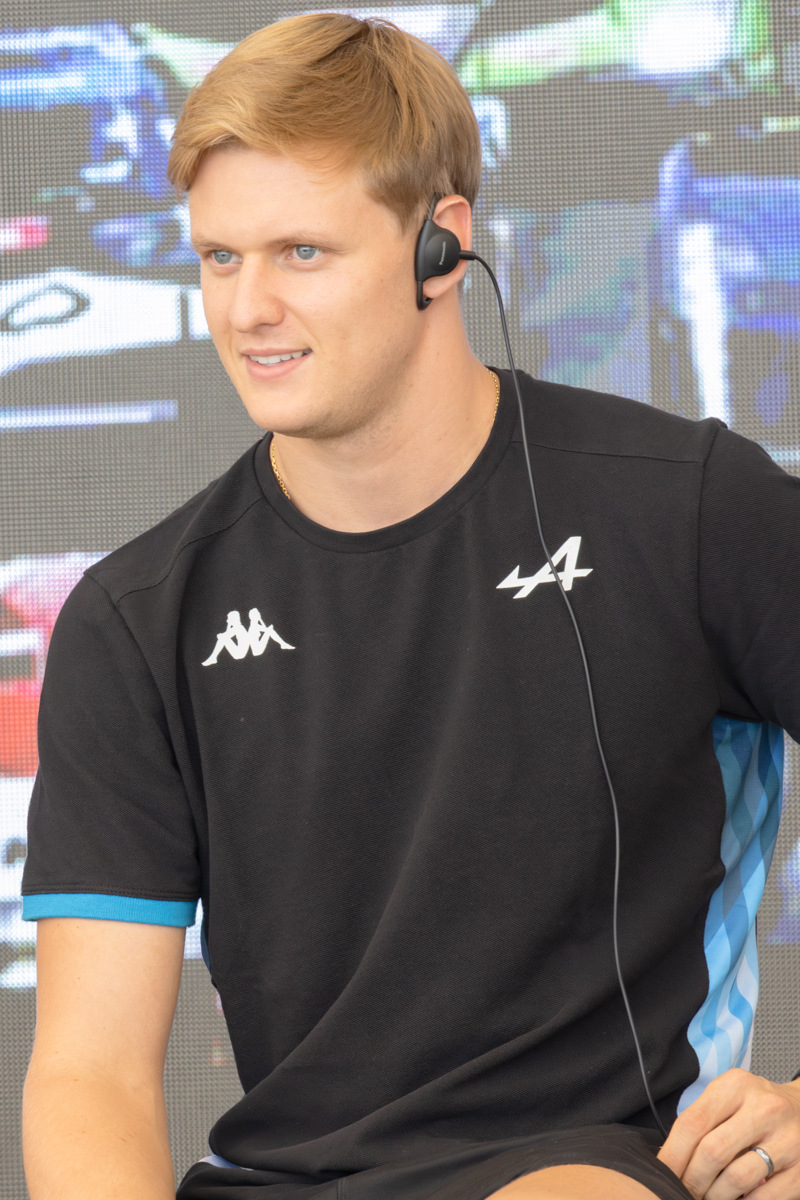
- Schumacher at the 2024 6 Hours of Fuji
- Born: 22 March 1999 (age 27); Genolier, Vaud, Switzerland
- Parents: Michael Schumacher (father); Corinna Schumacher (mother)
- Relatives: Gina-Maria Bethke (sister); Ralf Schumacher (uncle); Cora Schumacher (aunt); David Schumacher (cousin)

IndyCar Series career
- 18 races run over 1 year
- Team: No. 66 (Meyer Shank Racing)
- Best finish: 23rd (2026)
- First race: 2026 Firestone Grand Prix of St. Petersburg (St. Petersburg)
- Last race: 2026 Mission Grand Prix of Monterey (Laguna Seca)
Wins	Podiums	Poles
0	0	0

Formula One World Championship career
- Nationality: (Germany) German
- Active years: 2021–2022
- Team: Haas
- Car number: 47
- Entries: 44 (43 starts)
- Championships: 0
- Wins: 0
- Podiums: 0
- Career points: 12
- Pole positions: 0
- Fastest laps: 0
- First entry: 2021 Bahrain Grand Prix
- Last entry: 2022 Abu Dhabi Grand Prix

FIA World Endurance Championship career
- Categorisation: FIA Platinum
- Years active: 2024–2025
- Teams: Alpine
- Car number: 36
- Starts: 16
- Championships: 0
- Wins: 0
- Podiums: 3
- Poles: 0
- Fastest laps: 0
- Best finish: 16th in 2025 (HY)

24 Hours of Le Mans career
- Years: 2024–2025
- Teams: Alpine
- Best finish: 10th (2025)
- Class wins: 0

Previous series
- 2019–2020; 2017–2018; 2015–2017; 2016; 2015–2016: FIA Formula 2; FIA F3 European; MRF Challenge; Italian F4; ADAC F4

Championship titles
- 2020; 2018: FIA Formula 2; FIA F3 European

Awards
- 2026: Indianapolis 500 Rookie of the Year
Medal record
Motor racing
Representing Germany
Race of Champions
Runner-up	2023 Piteå	Individual
- Statistics up to date as of 4 September 2026.

Signature
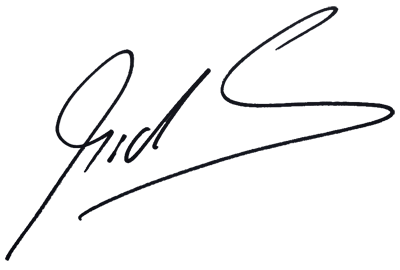

Mick Schumacher (German pronunciation: [ˈmɪk ˈʃuːmaxɐ]; born 22 March 1999) is a German racing driver who competes in the IndyCar Series, driving the No. 66 Dallara–Honda for Meyer Shank Racing. Schumacher competed in Formula One from 2021 to 2022, and the FIA World Endurance Championship from 2024 to 2025.

Born and raised in Switzerland, Schumacher is the son of seven-time Formula One World Drivers' Champion Michael Schumacher and equestrian Corinna Betsch, as well as the nephew of former Formula One driver Ralf and the cousin of sportscar racing driver David. Initially competing under the pseudonyms Mick Betsch and Mick Junior, Schumacher finished runner-up to Enaam Ahmed at the junior World and European Championships in 2014. Graduating to junior formulae in 2015, Schumacher finished runner-up in both ADAC F4 and Italian F4 the next year. After finishing third in the MRF Challenge Championship, Schumacher moved to FIA European Formula 3, winning the championship with Prema the following season. Progressing to FIA Formula 2 for 2019, Schumacher won the title in his 2020 campaign with Prema.

A member of the Ferrari Driver Academy since 2019, Schumacher was a test driver for Alfa Romeo and Haas in 2020, before signing with the latter as a full-time driver in 2021. Making his Formula One debut at the Bahrain Grand Prix alongside Nikita Mazepin, Haas failed to score points all season with the VF-21, with Schumacher finishing a season-best twelfth in Hungary. Retaining his seat to partner Kevin Magnussen for 2022, Schumacher scored his maiden points finish at the British Grand Prix, followed by a career-best sixth at the Austrian Grand Prix. After a series of high-profile crashes, Schumacher was released by Haas at the end of the season, returning as a reserve driver for both Mercedes and McLaren in 2023; he left both positions in 2024.

Schumacher moved to the FIA World Endurance Championship in 2024 with Alpine, achieving his maiden podium finish at the 6 Hours of Fuji. He achieved further podiums at the 6 Hours of Imola and Spa-Francorchamps in 2025, before moving to the IndyCar Series in 2026 with Rahal Letterman Lanigan Racing. In 2027, he will drive for Meyer Shank Racing.

== Early and personal life ==
Mick Schumacher was born on 22 March 1999 in Genolier, and grew up in Vufflens-le-Château and Gland. He is the son of seven-time Formula One World Champion Michael Schumacher and Western riding European Champion Corinna Schumacher and the brother of Western rider Gina-Maria Bethke. His uncle Ralf Schumacher is also a retired racing driver and former Formula One driver, and his cousin David is a racing driver as well. Schumacher is named after five-time 500cc motorcycle World Champion Mick Doohan.

Schumacher was skiing with his father when Michael suffered life-threatening brain injuries on 29 December 2013. In March 2017, Mick first talked publicly about his father, describing him as "my idol" and "my role model".

Before the start of the 2017 Belgian Grand Prix, he drove his father's championship-winning Benetton B194. He drove another of his father's championship winning cars, the Ferrari F2004, in a demonstration before the 2020 Tuscan Grand Prix at Mugello, to mark Scuderia Ferrari's 1000th Formula One race, wearing his father's helmet for the occasion.

Schumacher credits chess as being an integral part of his mental preparation before a Formula One race. He stated: "I feel like these games kind of bring focus back, as you always have to be switched on with your mind. In a weekend, I always want to be mentally ready for every challenge that comes."

== Junior racing career ==
=== Karting ===
Schumacher started his motorsport career in 2008. To avoid attention because of his famous father, he started his career under the pseudonym 'Mick Betsch', using his mother's maiden name.

In 2011 and 2012, Schumacher drove in the KF3 class in the ADAC Kart Masters, ending in ninth and seventh respectively. In 2011, he finished third in the Euro Wintercup in the KF3 class, repeating his success the following year.

In 2013, Schumacher continued his starts in the junior class, which got renamed to the KF-Junior. He finished third in the German Championship and the CIK-FIA International Super Cup. In 2014, Schumacher competed under the pseudonym Mick Junior—having already competed under the name Mick Betsch—and continued to race in KF-Junior. He finished second in the German Championship as well as in the European and World Championships. Although he did not race under his real surname, his successes in karting were picked up by the international press.

=== Formula 4 ===
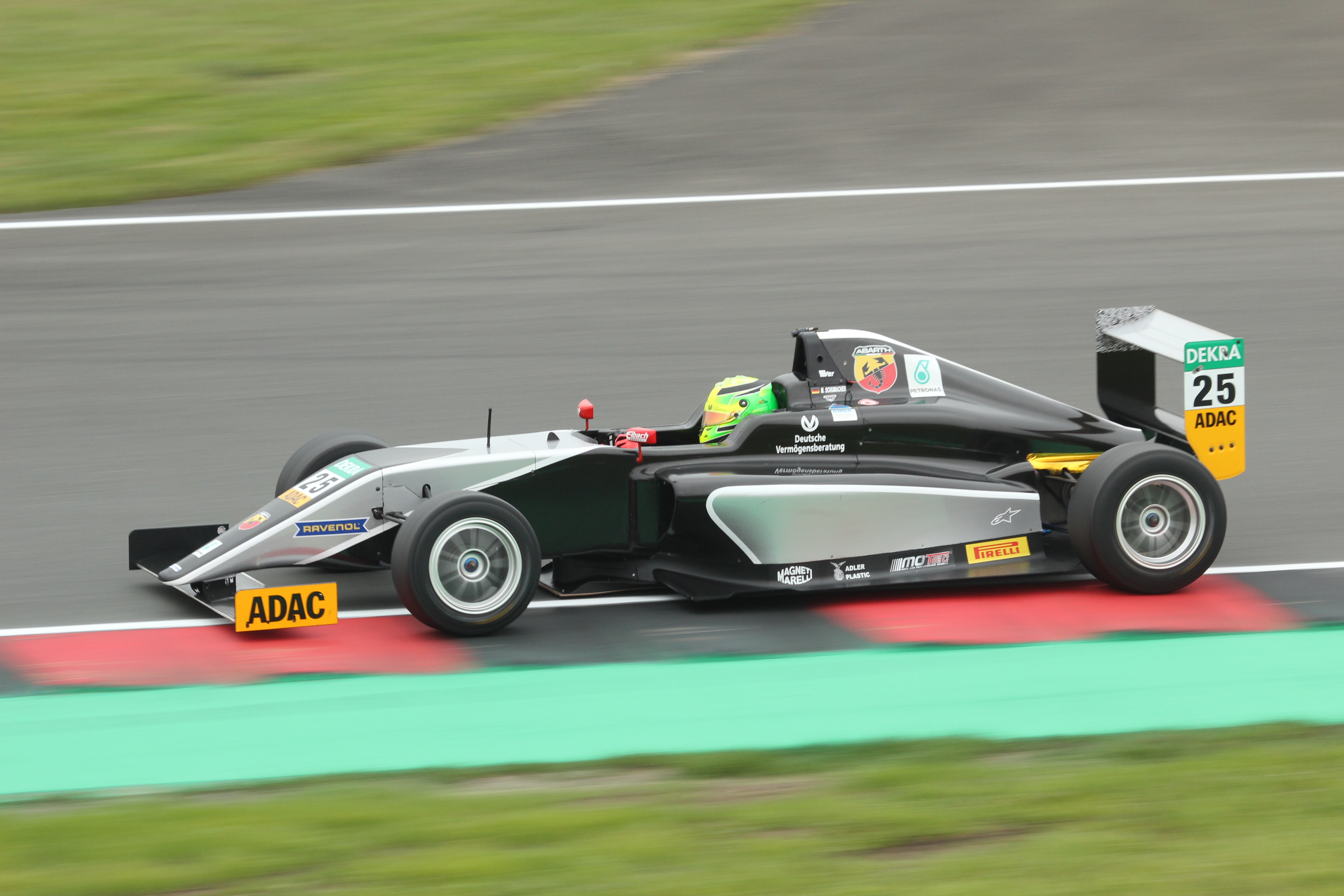
Schumacher competing in ADAC Formula 4 for Van Amersfoort Racing in 2015

At the end of 2014, Schumacher completed test drives for Jenzer Motorsport in a Formula 4 racing car. In 2015, Schumacher started racing in formula classes for the first time, racing for Van Amersfoort Racing in the ADAC Formula 4, using the Schumacher name. In 2016, Schumacher remained in ADAC Formula 4 but switched to Prema Powerteam, a team known for its close links to the Ferrari Driver Academy. He also entered the Italian F4 Championship and finished runner-up in both championships to Joey Mawson and Marcos Siebert respectively.

=== Formula Three ===
In November 2016, Schumacher made his first appearance in Formula 3 machinery by taking part in the MRF Challenge, a championship based in India. He competed in the upper Formula 2000 class and finished the series in third place, collecting four wins, nine podiums, and two pole positions. Schumacher finished behind Harrison Newey and Joey Mawson, but ahead of his future Formula 3 and Formula 2 competitors Jüri Vips and Felipe Drugovich.

==== 2017 ====
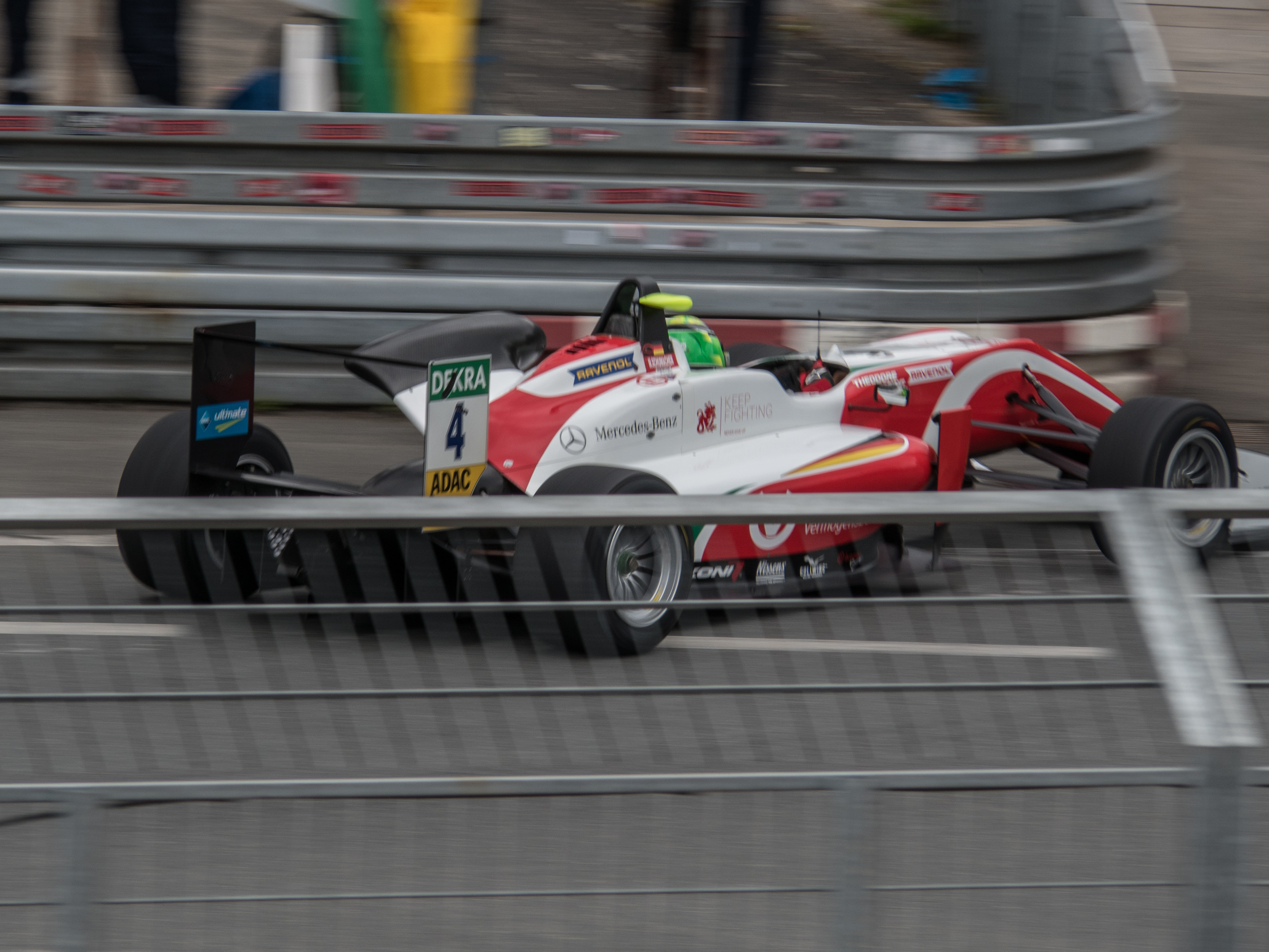
Mick Schumacher during the FIA Formula 3 round at Norisring in 2018

In April 2017, Schumacher made his debut in the FIA Formula 3 European Championship with Prema Powerteam. He finished the season in 12th place, his best finish being a third place at Monza. Schumacher was the lowest finisher of the four Prema drivers, however, he was the third-best-placed rookie in the championship.

==== 2018 ====
Schumacher continued driving for Prema in the 2018 championship. He suffered a slow start to the season, eventually taking his first win at the 15th race of the year at Spa-Francorchamps, almost halfway through the season. Before this race, he sat in tenth place in the championship, 67 points behind championship leader Dan Ticktum. However, Schumacher dominated the latter half of the season, taking seven more wins, including five consecutively. He ended the season as champion, 57 points clear of second-placed Ticktum, taking eight wins, fourteen total podium finishes, seven pole positions, and four fastest laps.

=== FIA Formula 2 ===
==== 2019 ====
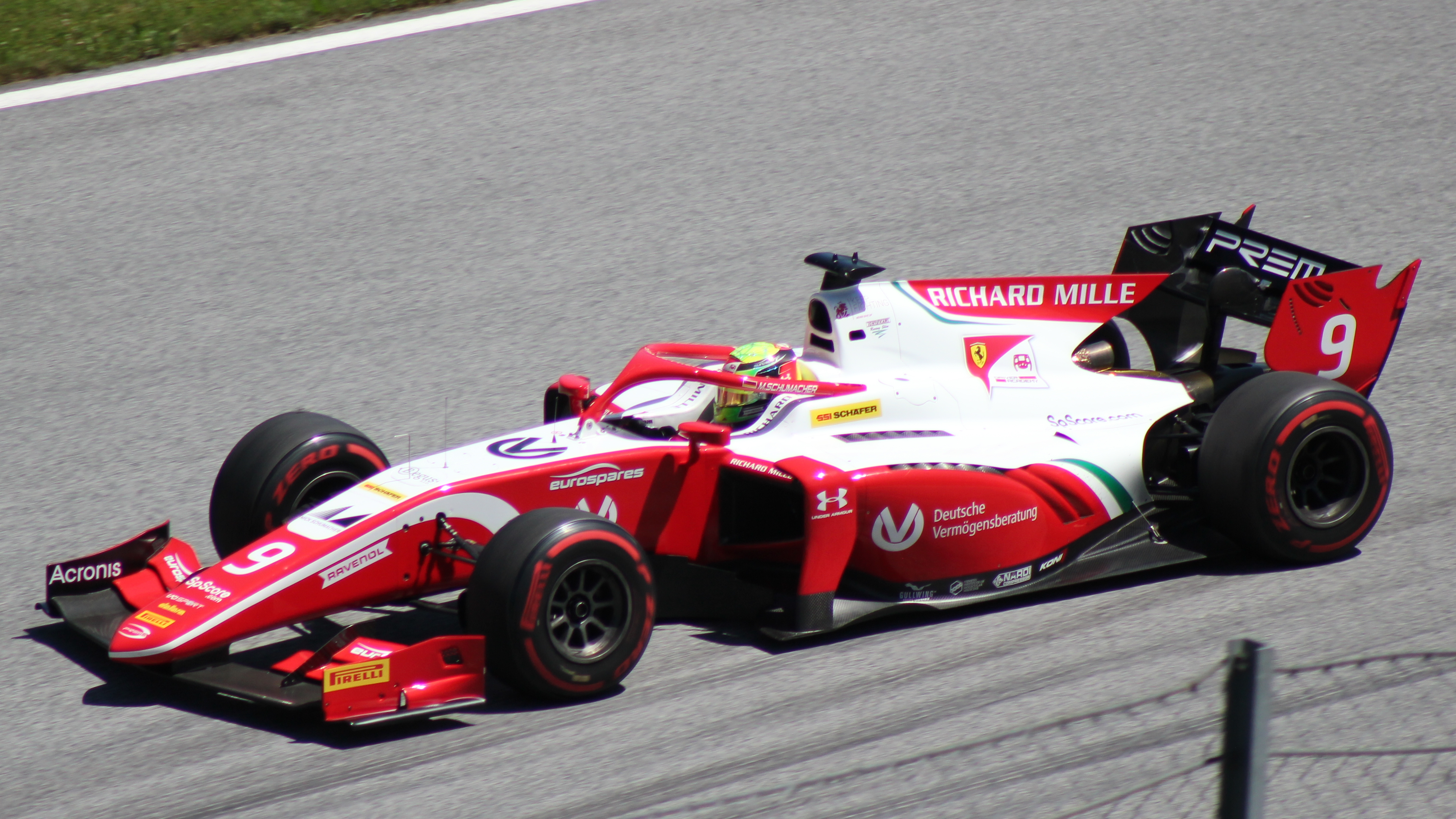
Schumacher racing in the 2019 Spielberg Formula 2 round

Schumacher moved up to the FIA Formula 2 Championship in 2019 with Prema Racing, alongside Sean Gelael. At the first round of the season in Bahrain, Schumacher started tenth and finished eighth after passing Nobuharu Matsushita on the final lap, giving him reverse-grid pole position for the sprint race, in which he finished sixth. Schumacher started from seventh in the feature race at Baku but was forced into retirement after a spin. He recovered from 19th to finish fifth in the sprint race. He failed to score points at Barcelona, suffering a collision in the first race and a time penalty for an illegal overtake on Jack Aitken in the second. At Monaco, Schumacher collided with multiple cars in the feature race, bringing out the red flag. He would fail to score points in either race. A double retirement came at the Circuit Paul Ricard, after he was involved in a collision with teammate Gelael in the first race and suffered a puncture in the second.

Schumacher stalled on the grid at the Red Bull Ring and finished in 18th place before a charge through the field in the sprint race saw him finish fourth. Another sprint race points-finish came at Silverstone with sixth place. He finished eighth at the feature race in Hungary, taking reverse-grid pole for the sprint race and holding the position to take his first win in Formula 2. Schumacher qualified sixth at Spa-Francorchamps, but both races were cancelled due to an accident that caused the death of Anthoine Hubert. At Monza, he retired from the feature race from a power issue but recovered to finish sixth in the sprint race, also achieving the fastest lap. He retired from both races in Russia, after an engine issue in the first and a collision with Giuliano Alesi in the second. Schumacher finished the season with ninth and 11th-place finishes in Abu Dhabi. He ended the season in 12th place in the championship with 53 points, considerably ahead of teammate Gelael, and took one win and one fastest lap.

==== 2020 ====
Schumacher continued with Prema in the 2020 FIA Formula 2 Championship, joined by reigning FIA Formula 3 champion and fellow Ferrari Driver Academy member Robert Shwartzman. In the feature race at Austria, he went off while battling Callum Ilott for the race lead. In the second round at the same circuit, his fire extinguisher went off in the sprint race. In Hungary, Schumacher bounced back with a double podium. He then went on a run of five consecutive podiums from Spain to Monza, including a win in the Feature race at Monza, and took the Championship lead at Mugello. He won the feature race at the next round in Russia and came third in the sprint race which was shortened due to a crash between Luca Ghiotto and Jack Aitken.

At the Bahrain Round, Schumacher qualified in tenth and rose to fourth in the Feature race. He finished seventh in the Sprint race. As a result, Callum Ilott was able to bring the deficit down to 14 points going into the final round on the Outer Track at the same venue.

In Sakhir, Schumacher qualified a career-worst 18th following an incident with Roy Nissany. He produced a good recovery drive up to sixth with the fastest lap. This meant that the points gap stayed the same going into the final race. In the Sprint race, Schumacher flat-spotted his tyres while fighting for the lead, which led to him defending from Ilott for the first half of the race. After a few more lock-ups, he pitted for softs, dropping him out of the points. As a result of hard attacking and defending, Ilott's tires didn't fare much better and he too slowly fell out of the points. This result confirmed Schumacher as the 2020 FIA Formula 2 Champion.

== Formula One career ==
Schumacher joined the Ferrari Driver Academy in January 2019, citing Ferrari's ties with his family as a significant reason for joining. In April 2019, he made his debut behind the wheel of a modern Formula One car, piloting the Ferrari SF90 during the first day of in-season testing at Bahrain International Circuit. He completed 56 laps during the test. He commented that being with Ferrari "felt like home" and that he was impressed by the braking power of the SF90. He continued in-season testing for Alfa Romeo Racing the following day.

Schumacher was due to make his Formula One practice debut at the 2020 Eifel Grand Prix in the first practice session, driving for Alfa Romeo in place of Antonio Giovinazzi. Due to bad weather conditions, the session was cancelled and he performed no running. Schumacher instead made his practice debut at the 2020 Abu Dhabi Grand Prix, driving for Haas in place of Kevin Magnussen. He later made an appearance for Haas at the post-season young drivers' test.

Ahead of the 2021 season, Schumacher requested to use the 'MSC' abbreviation for his name, shown on TV coverage. MSC was the abbreviation used by his father Michael, to distinguish between Michael and his brother Ralf, whose time in Formula One coincided. Schumacher had previously raced under the 'SCH' abbreviation in Formula 2.

=== Haas (2021–2022) ===
==== 2021 ====
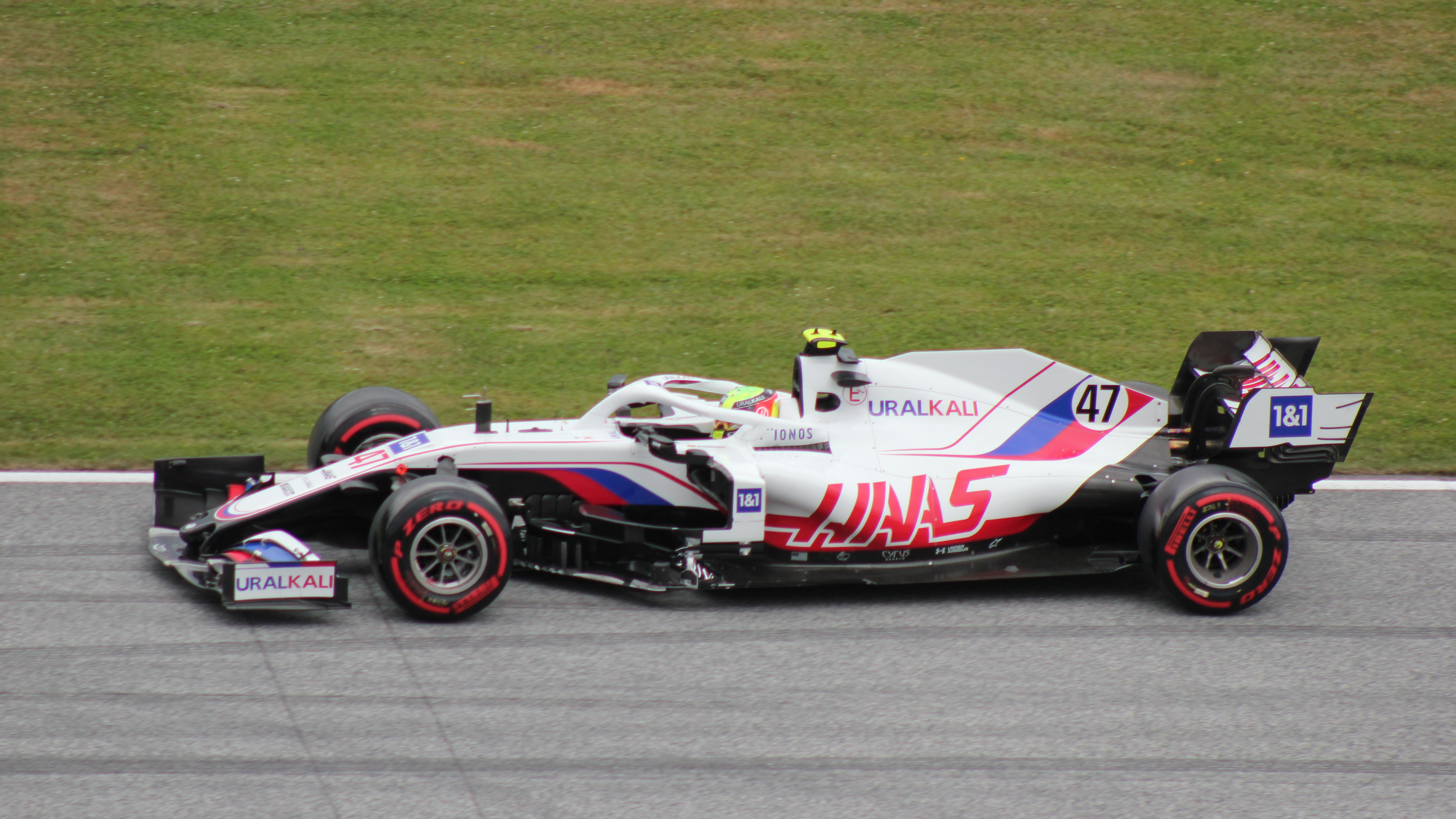
Schumacher at the 2021 Austrian Grand Prix

Schumacher drove for the Haas team in 2021 after signing a multi-year contract, alongside Nikita Mazepin, with whom he raced in go-karts. He chose to race with the number 47 as his two favourite numbers, 4 and 7, were already in use by Lando Norris and Kimi Räikkönen respectively. Ferrari team principal Mattia Binotto said that he expected Schumacher to have a "very difficult" first season, but added that he believed he could drive for Ferrari as early as 2023.

Schumacher qualified nineteenth for his debut race, the Bahrain Grand Prix, ahead of teammate Mazepin. He spun on the first lap but was able to continue, eventually finishing last of the remaining drivers in sixteenth place. At the next race, the Emilia Romagna Grand Prix, he crashed in front of the pit lane exit during a safety car period, breaking off his front wing, and went on to finish sixteenth. He crashed heavily in practice for the Monaco Grand Prix and the team was unable to repair his car in time for qualifying. He performed one of the only on-track overtakes of the Grand Prix, passing Mazepin at the Grand Hotel Hairpin on the opening lap. At the Azerbaijan Grand Prix, he overtook Mazepin shortly before the finish line, beating him by 0.074 seconds to claim thirteenth place.

Schumacher caused qualifying at the French Grand Prix to be red-flagged after crashing, although this secured him fifteenth place on the grid and marked his first appearance in the second segment of qualifying (Q2). He crashed in the final practice session for the Hungarian Grand Prix and was forced to miss qualifying as his car was not repaired in time. He avoided the collisions on the opening lap and was classified twelfth in the race, later commenting that he was proud of his performance after having on-track battles with Max Verstappen. His first retirement of the season came at the Russian Grand Prix with an oil leak. At the Turkish Grand Prix, Schumacher reached Q2 and qualified fourteenth, the highest qualifying position of his Formula One career at this point. He and Fernando Alonso collided on the opening lap, causing Schumacher to spin and eventually finish nineteenth. Alonso later apologised for his role in the incident. He started the Mexico City Grand Prix fourteenth on the grid but was eliminated at the first corner after a collision with Esteban Ocon. At the Saudi Arabian Grand Prix, his race ended on lap eight after crashing into a barrier, causing the race to be red-flagged.

Schumacher ended his debut season nineteenth in the drivers' championship, ahead of teammate Mazepin but with no points scored. He continued testing for Ferrari during the season, completing test sessions in the SF71H at Fiorano Circuit.

==== 2022 ====
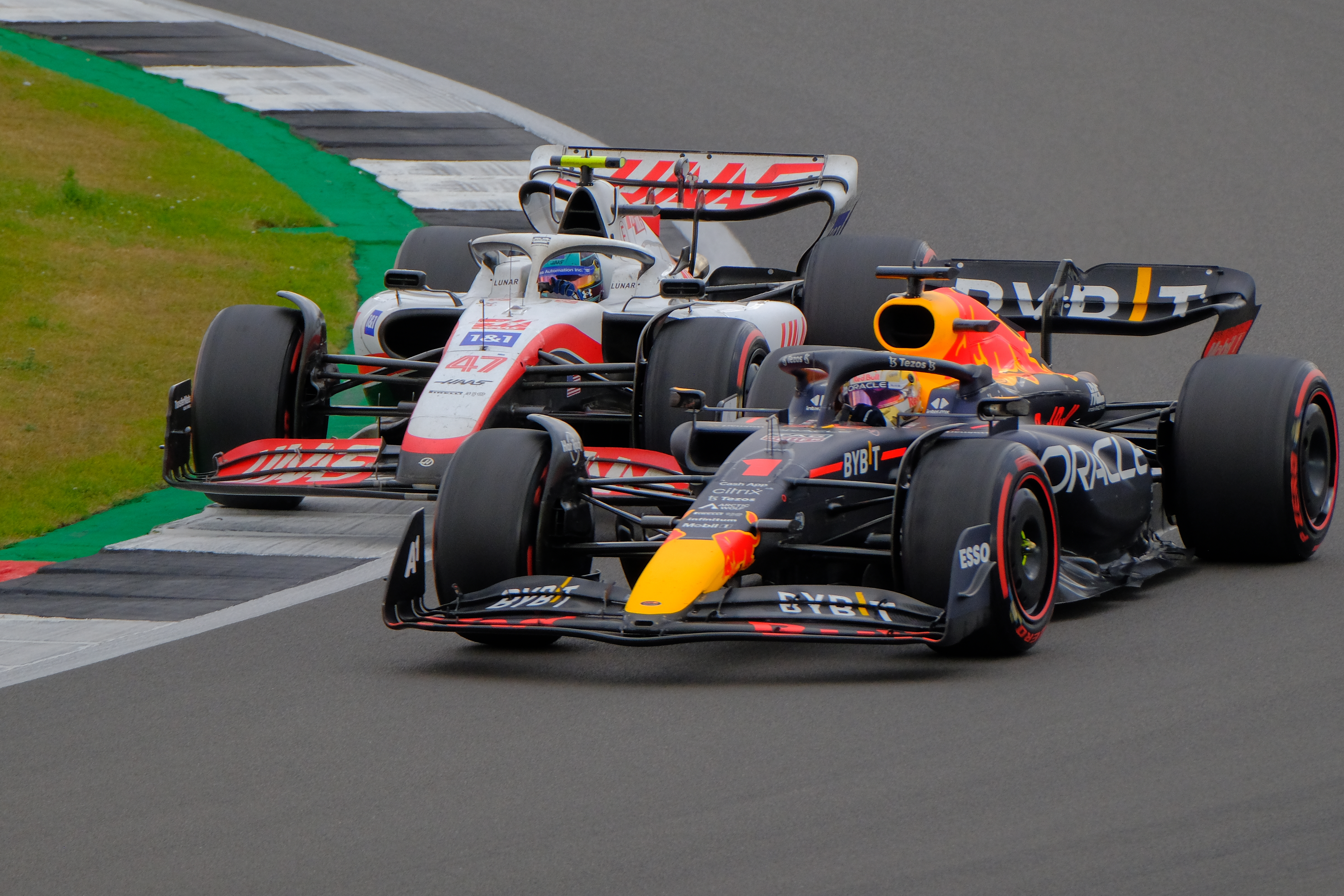
Schumacher (left) scored his maiden points finish in Formula One at the British Grand Prix in 2022 in a battle with Max Verstappen (right).

Schumacher remained with Haas for the 2022 season, partnering Kevin Magnussen. He also served as a reserve driver for Ferrari during the season, sharing duties with Antonio Giovinazzi.

Schumacher qualified twelfth and finished eleventh at the season opening Bahrain Grand Prix, gaining positions due to the retirements of both Red Bulls and Pierre Gasly and achieving his best Formula One race result thus far. Schumacher missed the Saudi Arabian Grand Prix after a high-impact crash in qualifying. He was transferred to hospital for precautionary checks and was released with no injuries. He made his racing return for the Australian Grand Prix, starting fifteenth and finishing thirteenth. Schumacher was running in the top ten with three laps remaining of the Miami Grand Prix, but collided with Sebastian Vettel during an overtake attempt and dropped to fifteenth. He reached the third qualifying session (Q3) for the first time in Formula One at the Spanish Grand Prix but finished the race outside the points. He had a heavy crash that split his car in half at the Monaco Grand Prix, causing the race to be red-flagged.

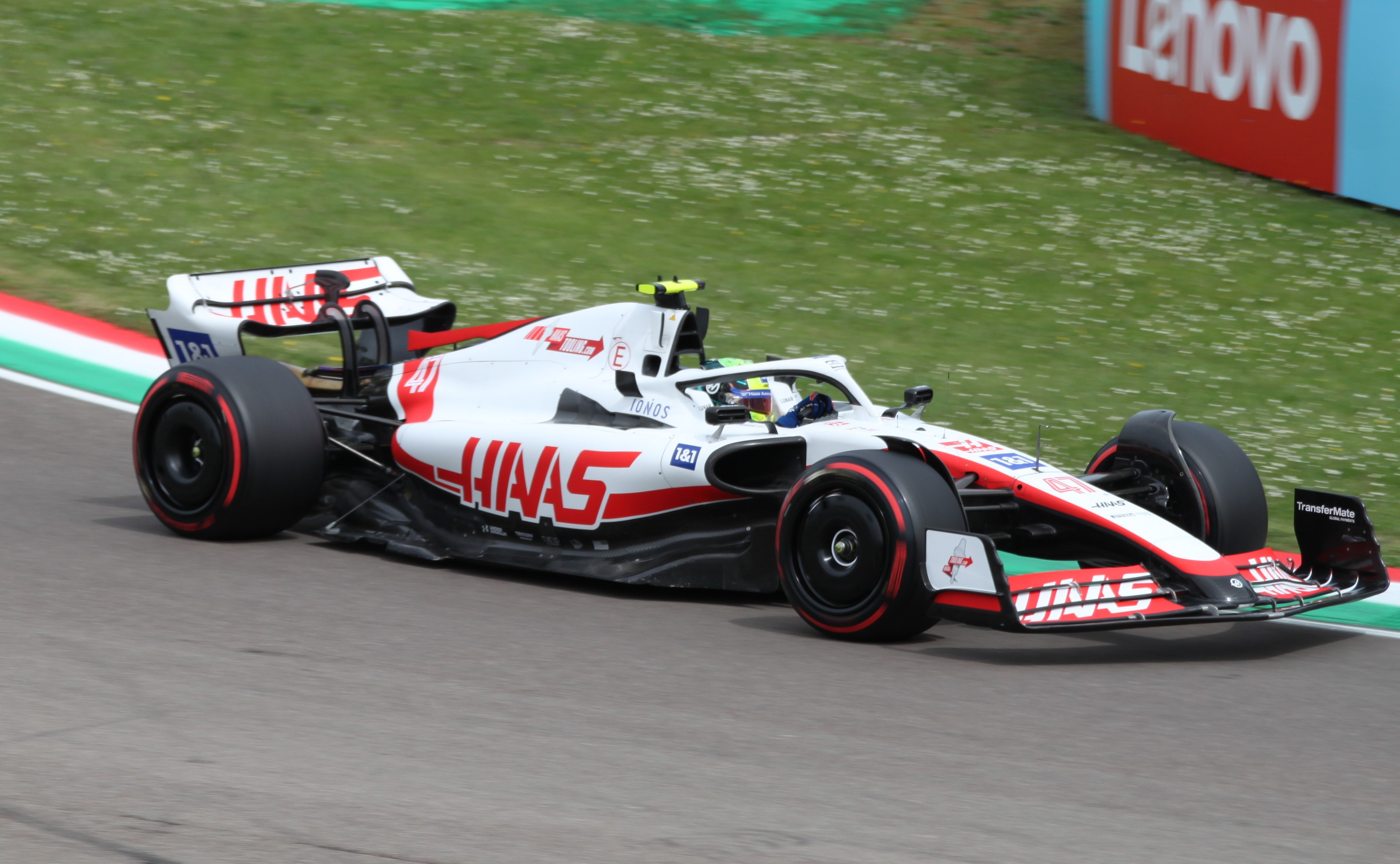
Schumacher at the 2022 Emilia Romagna Grand Prix

Schumacher improved his best qualifying position at the Canadian Grand Prix, starting sixth. He was running in seventh place until an engine failure ended his race. At the following race, the British Grand Prix, he started nineteenth and recovered to eighth to score his first Formula One points. A week later at the Austrian Grand Prix, Schumacher qualified seventh and finished sixth; his best Formula One result, promoting him to fifteenth place in the drivers' championship at the halfway point of the 2022 season. However, this would be his final points finish of the season. He reached Q3 again at the Dutch Grand Prix but finished outside the points. He qualified last at the São Paulo Grand Prix whilst teammate Magnussen claimed pole position and a point in the sprint race.

Ahead of the season-ending Abu Dhabi Grand Prix, Haas announced that they would part ways with Schumacher following the 2022 season. He was replaced by Nico Hülkenberg for 2023. Schumacher ended the season sixteenth in the World Drivers' Championship, with twelve points to Magnussen's 25.

=== Reserve driver roles (2023–2024) ===
In December 2022, Ferrari announced that they would be ending their collaboration with Schumacher after four years, Schumacher having joined the Ferrari Driver Academy back in 2019. On the same day, Mercedes-AMG confirmed Schumacher would take on the role of reserve driver for 2023, following his departure from Haas. Mercedes team principal Toto Wolff described Schumacher as "still hungry to learn and improve" and "ready to step into the car at short notice" should Lewis Hamilton or George Russell be unable to race. Schumacher was also made available as a reserve driver for McLaren, in a continuation of an arrangement between Mercedes and its engine customer. On 7 June, Schumacher drove the Mercedes W14 for a Pirelli tyre test at the Circuit de Barcelona-Catalunya. On 5 July, he drove the McLaren MCL35M in testing at Portimão.

Schumacher continued as a Mercedes reserve driver for the 2024 season, sharing the role with Frederik Vesti. He drove the Mercedes W15 during a test at Silverstone, before driving the W13 alongside Andrea Kimi Antonelli at Circuit de Barcelona-Catalunya. Ahead of the British Grand Prix, Schumacher was announced to be driving the Alpine A522 at the Circuit Paul Ricard with Alpine reserve Jack Doohan, as the Enstone outfit continued to assess their options for their 2025 lineup. On 28 November, it was announced that Schumacher would leave his Mercedes reserve driver role at the end of the season to focus on his commitments to Alpine's WEC division.

At the end of 2025, Schumacher confirmed that he was in talks of a return to the sport with new team Cadillac, but the team ultimately prioritised experience in their lineup with Sergio Pérez and Valtteri Bottas.

== WEC career ==
=== 2024 ===
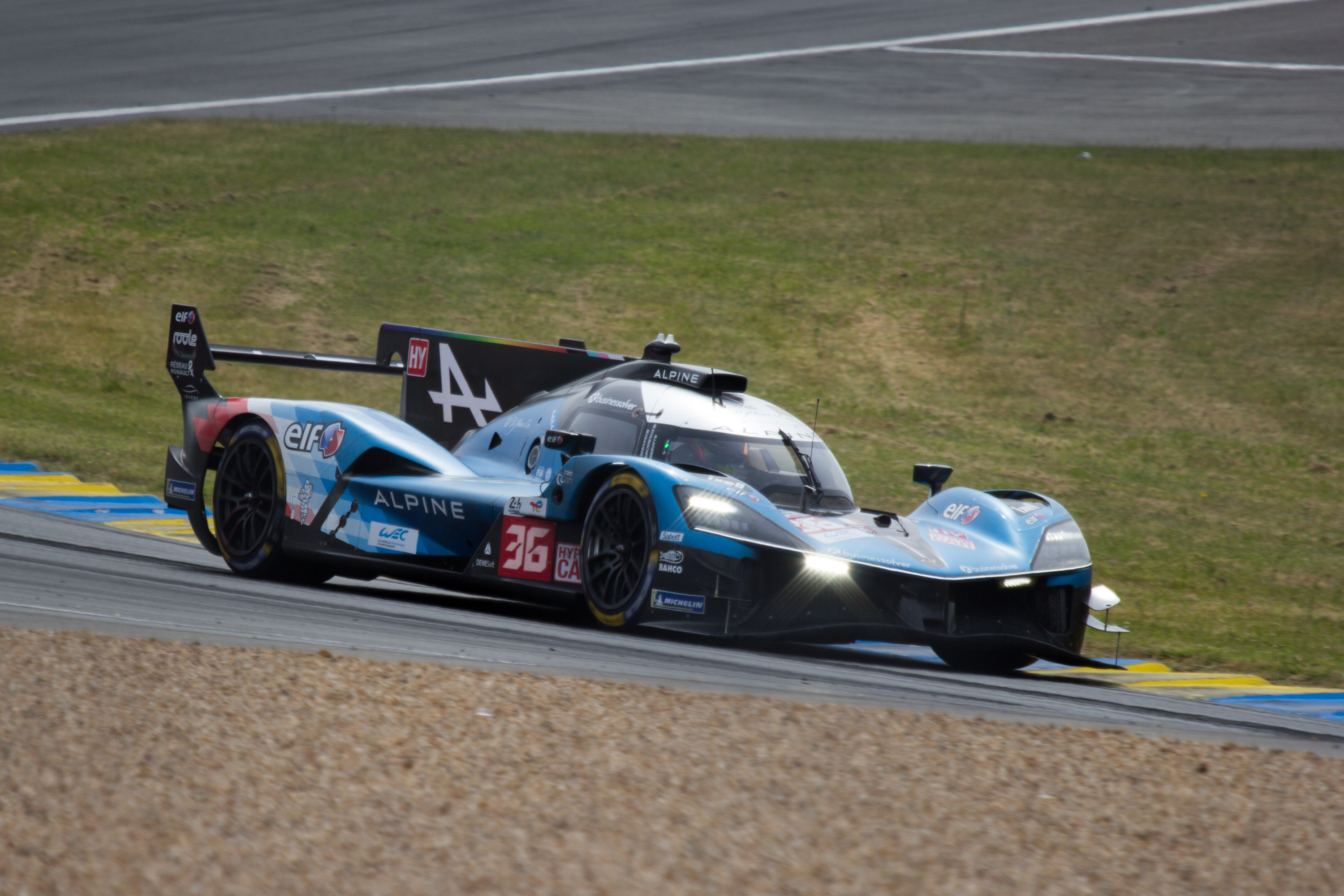
The No. 36 A424 being driven at the 2024 24 Hours of Le Mans

On 22 November 2023, it was announced that Schumacher would join Alpine's World Endurance Hypercar team for the 2024 season. His teammates would be Nicolas Lapierre, Ferdinand Habsburg, Paul-Loup Chatin, Matthieu Vaxivière and Charles Milesi.

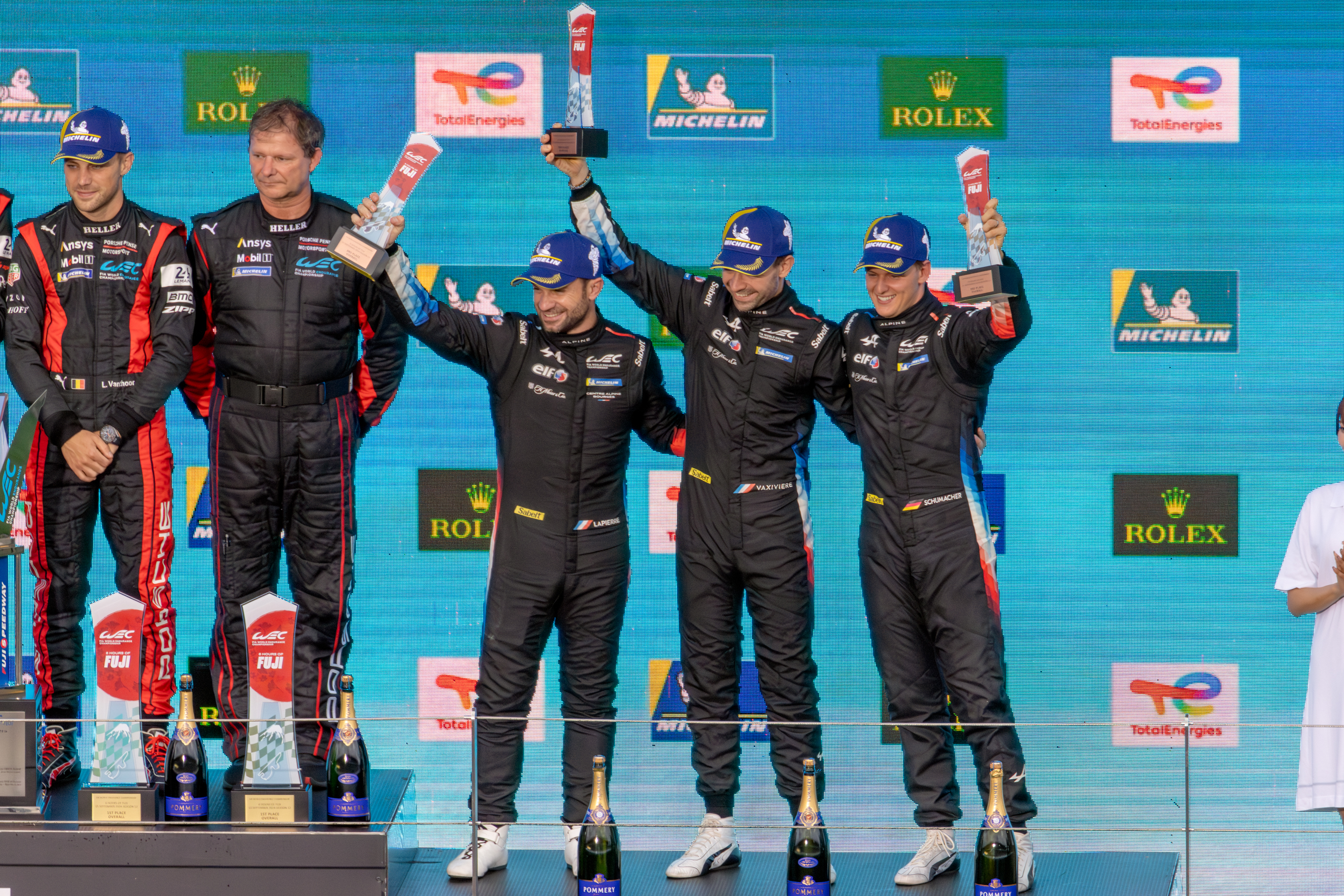
Schumacher standing alongside his Alpine teammates on the third step of the podium of the 2024 6 Hours of Fuji

The French outfit took their only podium finish of the year in Fuji where they took third in the closing laps, this result also marks Schumacher's first podium appearance since the 2020 Sochi Formula 2 round.

=== 2025 ===
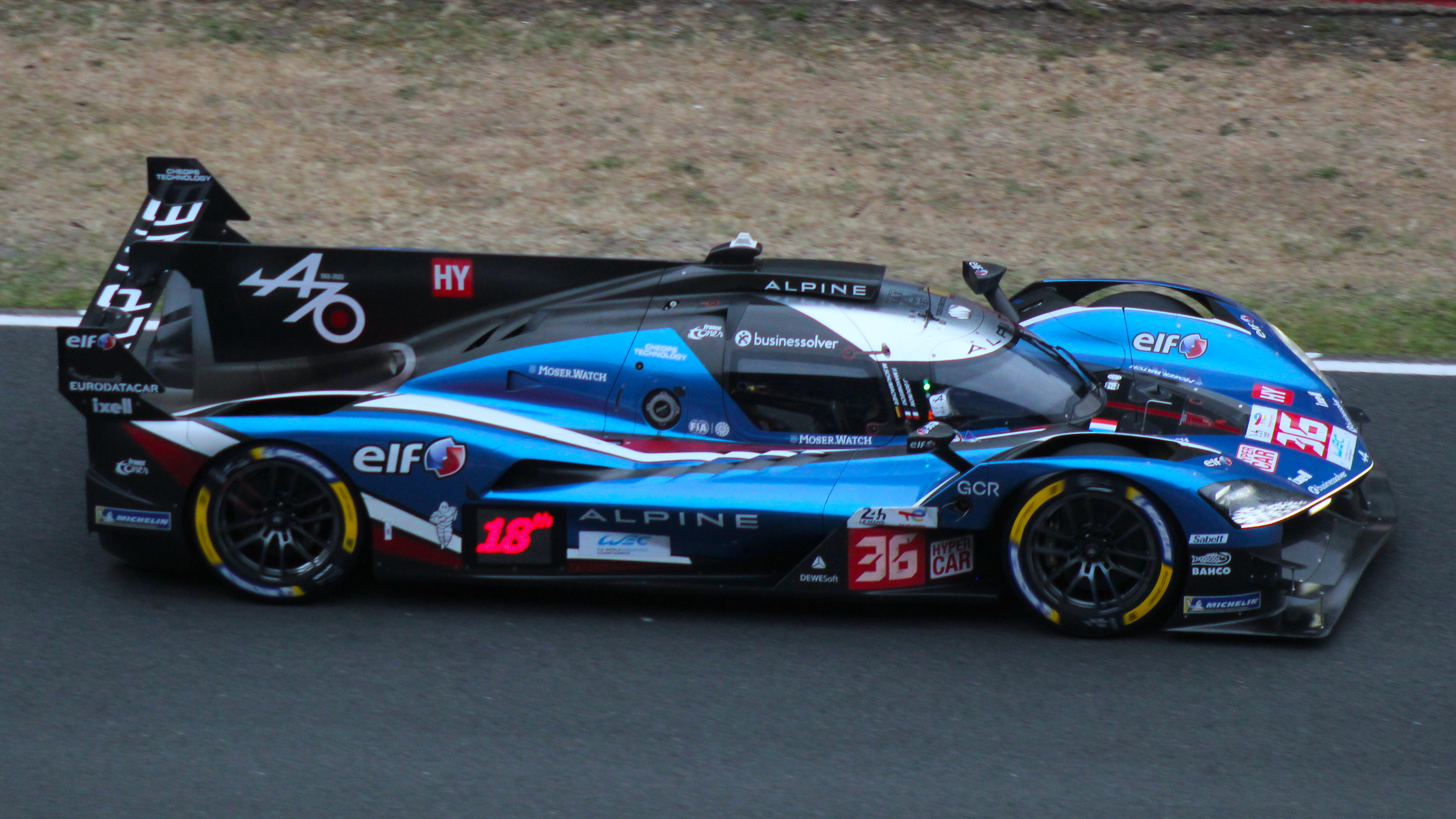
Schumacher's No. 36 car at the 2025 24 Hours of Le Mans

Schumacher stayed with Alpine Hypercar for the 2025 season, where his teammates in the No. 36 car were Frédéric Makowiecki and Jules Gounon. They managed podium finishes in Imola and Spa-Francorchamps. Schumacher departed Alpine at the end of the season.

== IndyCar career ==
In October 2025, Schumacher tested IndyCar machinery for the first time with Rahal Letterman Lanigan Racing at the Indianapolis Motor Speedway.

=== Rahal Letterman Lanigan Racing (2026) ===
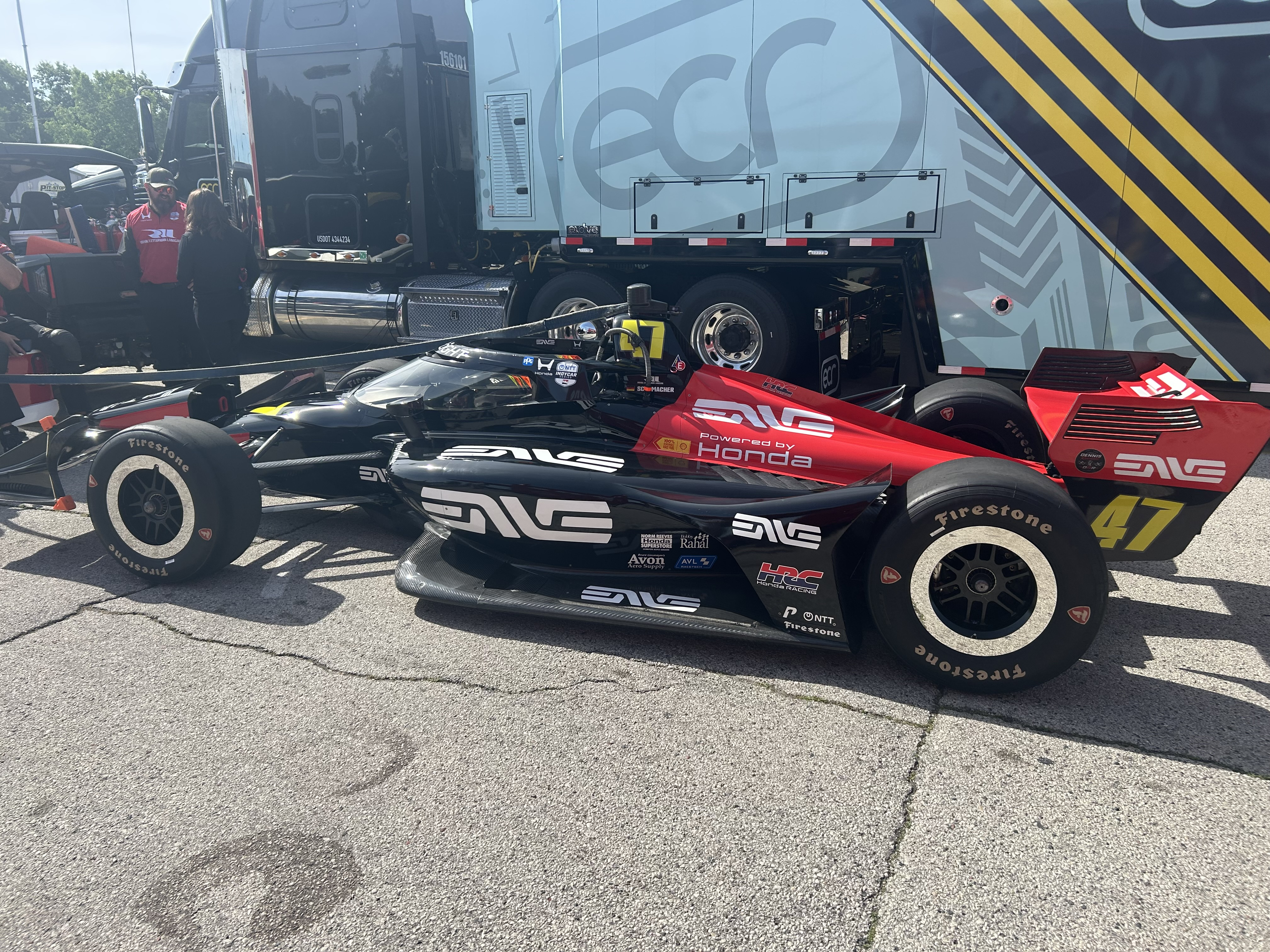
Schumacher's No. 47 at Road America in 2026

On 24 November 2025, it was announced that Schumacher would join RLL as a full-time driver for the 2026 IndyCar Series, driving the No. 47 Honda. Schumacher was named Indianapolis 500 Rookie of the Year for his performance in the 2026 Indianapolis 500.

=== Meyer Shank Racing (2027) ===
On 4 September 2026, it was announced that Schumacher would leave RLL for Meyer Shank Racing, piloting their No. 66 car.

== Karting record ==
=== Karting career summary ===
Season	Series	Team	Position
2008	Kerpener Kartchallenge — Bambini		11th
2008	Open RACC		DNF
2009	Kerpener Kartchallenge — Bambini	KSM Racing Team	4th
2010	Kerpener Kartchallenge — Bambini	KSM Motorsport	1st
2010	Werner-Grossevollmer-Memory-Trophy	Bambino A	33rd
2011	Euro Wintercup — KF3		3rd
2011	ADAC Kart Masters — KF3		9th
2011	DMV Kart Championship — KF3	KSM Racing Team	11th
2011	Ciao Thomas Knopper Memorial — KF3		6th
2012	South Garda Winter Cup — KF3		NC
2012	Bridgestone Cup Europe — KF3	KSM Motorsport	21st
2012	ADAC Kart Masters — KF3	KSM Motorsport	7th
2012	DMV Kart Championship — KF3	KSM Motorsport	3rd
2012	Euro Wintercup — KF3		3rd
2012	German Karting Championship — Junior		NC†
2013	South Garda Winter Cup — KF3		17th
2013	WSK Super Master Series — KFJ	Tony Kart Racing Team	16th
2013	WSK Euro Series — KFJ	Tony Kart Racing Team	19th
2013	CIK-FIA European Championship — KFJ	Tony Kart Racing Team	27th
2013	CIK-FIA International Super Cup — KFJ	Tony Kart Racing Team	3rd
2013	Trofeo delle Industrie — KF3	Tony Kart Racing Team	7th
2013	CIK-FIA World Championship — KFJ	Tony Kart Racing Team	58th
2013	German Karting Championship — Junior	KSM Racing Team	3rd
2014	WSK Champions Cup — KFJ	Tony Kart Racing Team	4th
2014	WSK Super Master Series — KFJ	Tony Kart Racing Team	10th
2014	CIK-FIA European Championship — KFJ	Tony Kart Racing Team	2nd
2014	CIK-FIA World Championship — KFJ	Tony Kart Racing Team	2nd
2014	German Karting Championship — Junior	KSM Racing-Team	2nd

== Racing record ==
=== Racing career summary ===
Season	Series	Team	Races	Wins	Poles	F/Laps	Podiums	Points	Position
2015	ADAC Formula 4 Championship	Van Amersfoort Racing	22	1	0	0	2	92	10th
2015	Remus Formel 4 – Formel 1800 Pokal	Van Amersfoort Racing	2	0	?	2	0	6	5th
2015–16	MRF Challenge Formula 2000	MRF Racing	4	0	0	0	2	51	10th
2016	ADAC Formula 4 Championship	Prema Powerteam	24	5	4	2	12	322	**2nd**
2016	Italian Formula 4 Championship	Prema Powerteam	18	5	4	6	10	216	**2nd**
2016–17	MRF Challenge Formula 2000	MRF Racing	16	4	2	1	9	215	**3rd**
2017	FIA Formula 3 European Championship	Prema Powerteam	30	0	0	0	1	94	12th
2017	Macau Grand Prix	Theodore Racing by Prema	1	0	0	1	0	N/A	16th
2018	FIA Formula 3 European Championship	Prema Theodore Racing	30	8	7	4	14	365	**1st**
2018	Macau Grand Prix	SJM Theodore Racing by Prema	1	0	0	0	0	N/A	5th
2019	Formula 2 Championship	Prema Racing	22	1	0	2	1	53	12th
2020	Formula 2 Championship	Prema Racing	24	2	0	2	10	215	**1st**
2020	Formula One	Alfa Romeo Racing Orlen	Test driver						
2020	Formula One	Haas F1 Team	Test driver						
2021	Formula One	Uralkali Haas F1 Team	22	0	0	0	0	0	19th
2021	Formula One	Scuderia Mission Winnow Ferrari	Reserve driver						
2022	Formula One	Haas F1 Team	22	0	0	0	0	12	16th
2022	Formula One	Scuderia Ferrari	Reserve driver						
2023	Formula One	Mercedes-AMG Petronas F1 Team	Reserve driver						
2023	Formula One	McLaren F1 Team	Reserve driver						
2024	FIA World Endurance Championship - Hypercar	Alpine Endurance Team	8	0	0	0	1	21	22nd
2024	Formula One	Mercedes-AMG Petronas F1 Team	Reserve driver						
2025	FIA World Endurance Championship - Hypercar	Alpine Endurance Team	8	0	0	0	2	36	16th
2026	IndyCar Series	Rahal Letterman Lanigan Racing	18	0	0	0	0	213	23rd

^{*} Season still in progress.

=== Complete ADAC Formula 4 Championship results ===
(key) (Races in bold indicate pole position) (Races in italics indicate fastest lap)

Year	Team	1	2	3	4	5	6	7	8	9	10	11	12	13	14	15	16	17	18	19	20	21	22	23	24	DC	Points
2015	Van Amersfoort Racing	OSC1; 1; 9	OSC1; 2; 12	OSC1; 3; 1	RBR; 1 Ret	RBR; 2; 10	RBR; 3 DNS	SPA; 1; 15	SPA; 2; 15	SPA; 3; 34	LAU; 1 EX	LAU; 2; 16	LAU; 3 Ret	NÜR; 1; 9	NÜR; 2; 6	NÜR; 3; 10	SAC; 1; 5	SAC; 2 Ret	SAC; 3; 18	OSC2; 1; 4	OSC2; 2; 3	OSC2; 3; 31	HOC; 1 Ret	HOC; 2; 5	HOC; 3; 7	10th	92
2016	Prema Powerteam	OSC1; 1; 4	OSC1; 2; 4	OSC1; 3; 1	SAC; 1; 4	**SAC**; **2**; 2	SAC; 3; 4	**LAU**; **1**; 1	**LAU**; **2**; 1	LAU; 3; 6	OSC2; 1; 3	OSC2; 2; 2	OSC2; 3; 26	RBR; 1; 6	RBR; 2; 11	RBR; 3; 2	**NÜR**; **1**; 1	NÜR; 2; 15	NÜR; 3; 2	ZAN; 1; 3	ZAN; 2; 3	ZAN; 3; 6	HOC; 1; 6	HOC; 2; 8	HOC; 3; 1	2nd	322

=== Complete MRF Challenge Formula 2000 Championship results ===
(key) (Races in bold indicate pole position; races in italics indicate fastest lap)

Year	Team	1	2	3	4	5	6	7	8	9	10	11	12	13	14	15	16	DC	Points
2015–16	MRF Racing	YMC; 1	YMC; 2	YMC; 3	YMC; 4	BHR; 1	BHR; 2	DUB; 1	DUB; 2	DUB; 3	DUB; 4	CHE; 1; 3	CHE; 2; 6	CHE; 3; 5	CHE; 4; 2			10th	51
2016–17	MRF Racing	BHR; 1; 5	BHR; 2; 1	BHR; 3; 3	BHR; 4; 1	DUB; 1; 3	DUB; 2; 4	DUB; 3 Ret	DUB; 4 Ret	**GNO**; **1**; 1	GNO; 2; 3	**GNO**; **3**; 1	GNO; 4 Ret	CHE; 1; 2	CHE; 2; 7	CHE; 3 Ret	CHE; 4; 2	3rd	213

=== Complete Italian Formula 4 Championship results ===
(key) (Races in bold indicate pole position) (Races in italics indicate fastest lap)

Year	Team	1	2	3	4	5	6	7	8	9	10	11	12	13	14	15	16	17	18	19	20	21	22	23	DC	Points
2016	Prema Powerteam	MIS; 1; 1	**MIS**; **2**; 1	MIS; 3	**MIS**; **4**; 4	ADR; 1	ADR; 2	ADR; 3	ADR; 4	IMO1; 1; 2	**IMO1**; **2**; 1	IMO1; 3; 4	MUG; 1; 2	MUG; 2 Ret	MUG; 3; 11	VLL; 1; 3	VLL; 2; 1	VLL; 3; 2	**IMO2**; **1**; 12	IMO2; 2 Ret	IMO2; 3; 22	MNZ; 1; 1	MNZ; 2; 25	MNZ; 3; 2	2nd	216

=== Complete FIA Formula 3 European Championship results ===
(key) (Races in bold indicate pole position) (Races in italics indicate fastest lap)

Year	Entrant	1	2	3	4	5	6	7	8	9	10	11	12	13	14	15	16	17	18	19	20	21	22	23	24	25	26	27	28	29	30	DC	Points
2017	Prema Powerteam	SIL; 1; 8	SIL; 2; 6	SIL; 3; 17	MNZ; 1; 6	MNZ; 2; 3	MNZ; 3; 6	PAU; 1; 9	PAU; 2; 11	PAU; 3; 12	HUN; 1; 9	HUN; 2; 9	HUN; 3; 11	NOR; 1; 7	NOR; 2; 12	NOR; 3 Ret	SPA; 1; 6	SPA; 2; 9	SPA; 3; 8	ZAN; 1; 6	ZAN; 2; 9	ZAN; 3; 11	NÜR; 1; 8	NÜR; 2; 15	NÜR; 3; 11	RBR; 1; 7	RBR; 2; 10	RBR; 3; 8	HOC; 1; 11	HOC; 2; 18	HOC; 3; 18	12th	94
2018	Prema Theodore Racing	PAU; 1; 16	PAU; 2; 10	PAU; 3; 7‡	HUN; 1; 4	HUN; 2; 7	HUN; 3; 3	NOR; 1; 5	NOR; 2; 9	NOR; 3; 15	ZAN; 1; 3	ZAN; 2 Ret	ZAN; 3; 13	SPA; 1; 4	**SPA**; **2** Ret	SPA; 3; 1	SIL; 1 Ret	SIL; 2; 1	SIL; 3; 5	**MIS**; **1**; 1	MIS; 2; 3	MIS; 3; 5	NÜR; 1; 1	**NÜR**; **2**; 1	**NÜR**; **3**; 1	**RBR**; **1**; 1	**RBR**; **2**; 1	**RBR**; **3**; 2	HOC; 1; 12	HOC; 2; 2	HOC; 3; 2	**1st**	**365**

^{‡} Half points were awarded as less than 75% of race distance was completed.

=== Complete Macau Grand Prix results ===
Year	Team	Car	Qualifying	Quali Race	Main race
2017	(Italy) Prema Powerteam	Dallara F317	7th	20th	16th
2018	(Italy) SJM Theodore Racing by Prema	Dallara F317	9th	6th	5th

=== Complete FIA Formula 2 Championship results ===
(key) (Races in bold indicate pole position) (Races in italics indicate points for the fastest lap of top ten finishers)

Year	Entrant	1	2	3	4	5	6	7	8	9	10	11	12	13	14	15	16	17	18	19	20	21	22	23	24	DC	Points
2019	Prema Racing	BHR; FEA; 8	BHR; SPR; 6	BAK; FEA; Ret	BAK; SPR; 5	CAT; FEA; 15	CAT; SPR; 12	MON; FEA; 13	MON; SPR; 11	LEC; FEA; Ret	LEC; SPR; Ret	RBR; FEA; 18	RBR; SPR; 4	SIL; FEA; 11	SIL; SPR; 6	HUN; FEA; 8	HUN; SPR; 1	SPA; FEA; C	SPA; SPR; C	MNZ; FEA; NC	MNZ; SPR; 6	SOC; FEA; Ret	SOC; SPR; Ret	YMC; FEA; 9	YMC; SPR; 11	12th	53
2020	Prema Racing	RBR1; FEA; 11	RBR1; SPR; 7	RBR2; FEA; 4	RBR2; SPR; Ret	HUN; FEA; 3	HUN; SPR; 3	SIL1; FEA; 9	SIL1; SPR; 14	SIL2; FEA; 7	SIL2; SPR; 2	CAT; FEA; 6	CAT; SPR; 3	SPA; FEA; 3	SPA; SPR; 2	MNZ; FEA; 1	MNZ; SPR; 3	MUG; FEA; 5	MUG; SPR; 4	SOC; FEA; 1	SOC; SPR; 3‡	BHR1; FEA; 4	BHR1; SPR; 7	BHR2; FEA; 6	BHR2; SPR; 18	1st	215

^{‡} Half points were awarded as less than 75% of race distance was completed.

=== Complete Formula One results ===
(key) (Races in bold indicate pole position) (Races in italics indicate fastest lap)

Year	Entrant	Chassis	Engine	1	2	3	4	5	6	7	8	9	10	11	12	13	14	15	16	17	18	19	20	21	22	WDC	Points
2020	Alfa Romeo Racing Orlen	Alfa Romeo Racing C39	Ferrari 065 1.6 V6 t	AUT	STY	HUN	GBR	70A	ESP	BEL	ITA	TUS	RUS	EIF; TD (Note: Schumacher was due to take part in the first practice session as a test driver, but it was cancelled due to bad weather conditions.)	POR	EMI	TUR	BHR	SKH							–	–
2020	Haas F1 Team	Haas VF-20	Ferrari 065 1.6 V6 t																	ABU; TD						–	–
2021	Uralkali Haas F1 Team	Haas VF-21	Ferrari 065/6 1.6 V6 t	BHR; 16	EMI; 16	POR; 17	ESP; 18	MON; 18	AZE; 13	FRA; 19	STY; 16	AUT; 18	GBR; 18	HUN; 12	BEL; 16	NED; 18	ITA; 15	RUS; Ret	TUR; 19	USA; 16	MXC; Ret	SAP; 18	QAT; 16	SAU; Ret	ABU; 14	19th	0
2022	Haas F1 Team	Haas VF-22	Ferrari 066/7 1.6 V6 t	BHR; 11	SAU; WD	AUS; 13	EMI; 17	MIA; 15	ESP; 14	MON; Ret	AZE; 14	CAN; Ret	GBR; 8	AUT; 6	FRA; 15	HUN; 14	BEL; 17	NED; 13	ITA; 12	SIN; 13	JPN; 17	USA; 15	MXC; 16	SAP; 13	ABU; 16	16th	12

=== Complete FIA World Endurance Championship results ===
(key) (Races in bold indicate pole position) (Races in italics indicate fastest lap)

Year	Entrant	Class	Chassis	Engine	1	2	3	4	5	6	7	8	Rank	Points
2024	Alpine Endurance Team	Hypercar	Alpine A424	Alpine 3.4 L Turbo V6	QAT; 11	IMO; 16	SPA; 12	LMS; Ret	SÃO; 10	COA; 9	FUJ; 3	BHR; 9	22nd	21
2025	Alpine Endurance Team	Hypercar	Alpine A424	Alpine 3.4 L Turbo V6	QAT; 13	IMO; 3	SPA; 3	LMS; 10	SÃO; 9	COA; 15	FUJ; 14	BHR; 12	16th	36

=== Complete 24 Hours of Le Mans results ===
Year	Team	Co-Drivers	Car	Class	Laps	Pos.	Class Pos.
2024	(France) Alpine Endurance Team	(France) Nicolas Lapierre (France) Matthieu Vaxivière	Alpine A424	Hypercar	88	DNF	DNF
2025	(France) Alpine Endurance Team	(France) Jules Gounon (France) Frédéric Makowiecki	Alpine A424	Hypercar	384	10th	10th

=== American open–wheel racing results ===
==== IndyCar Series ====
(key)

Year	Team	No.	Chassis	Engine	1	2	3	4	5	6	7	8	9	10	11	12	13	14	15	16	17	18	Rank	Points	Ref
2026	Rahal Letterman Lanigan Racing	47	Dallara DW12	Honda	STP; 25	PHX; 18	ARL; 22	ALA; 24	LBH; 17	IMS; 20	INDY; 18	DET; 21	GTW; 16	ROA; 17	MOH; 24	NSH; 8	POR; 16	MRK; 25	WSH; 11	MIL; 12	MIL; 13	LAG; 22	23rd	213	

^{*} Season still in progress.

==== Indianapolis 500 ====
Year	Chassis	Engine	Start	Finish	Team
2026	Dallara	Honda	27	18	Rahal Letterman Lanigan Racing

== Notes ==
Sporting positions
Preceded by Lando Norris	FIA Formula 3 European Championship; Champion; 2018	Succeeded by Robert Shwartzman (FIA Formula 3 Championship)
Preceded by Nyck de Vries	FIA Formula 2 Championship; Champion; 2020	Succeeded by Oscar Piastri
Preceded by Robert Shwartzman	Indianapolis 500; Rookie of the Year; 2026	Succeeded by Incumbent
