= 2021 Russian Grand Prix =

15th round of the 2021 Formula One season

Race 15 of 22 in the 2021 Formula One World Championship
← Previous race	Next race →
- Layout of Sochi Autodrom

Race details
- Date: 26 September 2021
- Official name: Formula 1 VTB Russian Grand Prix 2021
- Location: Sochi Autodrom, Krasnodar Krai, Russia
- Course: Permanent racing facility
- Course length: 5.848 km (3.634 miles)
- Distance: 53 laps, 309.745 km (192.467 miles)
- Weather: Cloudy and rainy

Pole position
Driver	(United Kingdom) Lando Norris	McLaren-Mercedes
- Time: 1:41.993

Fastest lap
Driver	(United Kingdom) Lando Norris	McLaren-Mercedes
- Time: 1:37.423 on lap 39

Podium
First	(United Kingdom) Lewis Hamilton	Mercedes
Second	(Netherlands) Max Verstappen	Red Bull Racing-Honda
Third	(Spain) Carlos Sainz Jr.	Ferrari

The 2021 Russian Grand Prix (officially known as the Formula 1 VTB Russian Grand Prix 2021) was a Formula One motor race, held on 26 September 2021 at the Sochi Autodrom. It was the 15th round of the 2021 Formula One World Championship. It was the tenth running of the Russian Grand Prix, and the eighth and final held in Sochi.

McLaren's Lando Norris took pole position in drying conditions. He led the majority of the race, but lost the lead as he opted not to switch to intermediates amidst worsening conditions. The race was won by Mercedes' Lewis Hamilton, who became the first driver to win 100 Grands Prix, ahead of Max Verstappen and Carlos Sainz Jr. Hamilton's victory allowed him to regain the championship lead over Verstappen.

This was the last Formula One race held at Sochi Autodrom and the last Russian Grand Prix, as of the 2026 season, due to the Russian invasion of Ukraine that happened five months after the race was held.

== Background ==
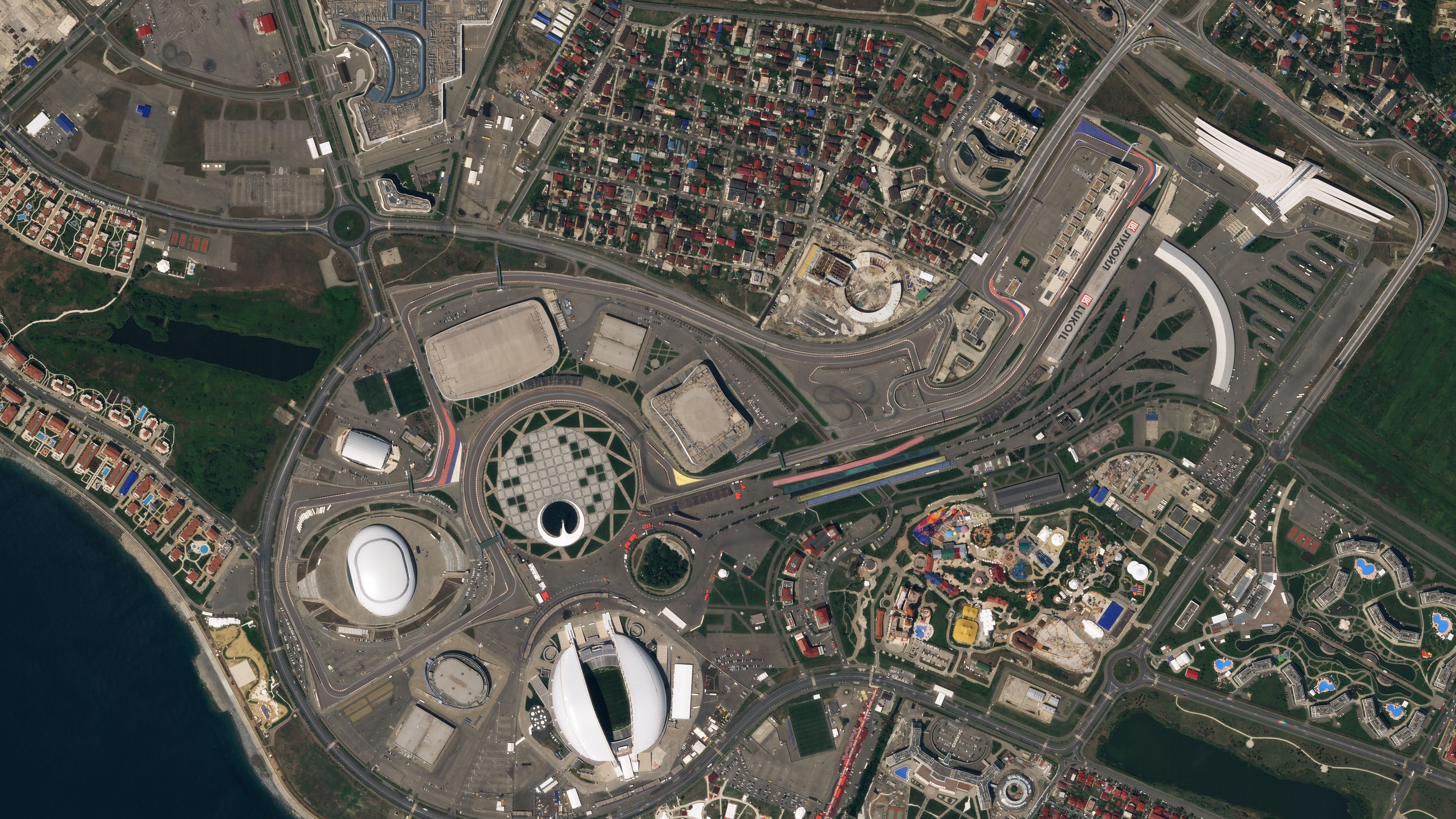
Aerial view of Sochi Autodrom.

The event, held over the weekend of 24–26 September, at the Sochi Autodrom, was the fifteenth round of the 2021 World Championship. The race took place two weeks after the Italian Grand Prix and two weeks before the Turkish Grand Prix. Despite having to race as a neutral competitor, using the designation RAF (Russian Automobile Federation), it was Nikita Mazepin's home race.

The rules surrounding practice starts for the event have been clarified following controversy in the 2020 event when Lewis Hamilton was penalised with two five-second penalties for conducting two practice starts outside of the designated area. The race director's notes state that when doing practice starts, cars must line up and leave in the order they arrive unless another car is unduly delayed.

=== Championship standings before the race ===
Heading into the race, Max Verstappen led the Drivers' Championship with 226.5 points, five points ahead of Lewis Hamilton. Valtteri Bottas was third with 141 points, nine points ahead of Lando Norris in fourth. Sergio Pérez remained fifth with 118 points. In the Constructors' Championship, Mercedes led with 362.5 points, 18 ahead of Red Bull in second. McLaren were third with 215 points, 13.5 points ahead of Ferrari in fourth. Alpine were fifth with 95 points.

=== Entrants ===
The drivers and teams were the same as the season entry list with no additional stand-in drivers for the race. Kimi Räikkönen returned for this event, after missing the previous two races due to testing positive for coronavirus.

The title sponsor of Ferrari, Mission Winnow, returned for this race. The name and sponsor logos were used by Ferrari at the Bahrain, Emilia Romagna, Portuguese, Spanish, Monaco, and Azerbaijan Grands Prix, but were not used in any races from the French Grand Prix to the Italian Grand Prix for legal reasons.

=== Tyre choices ===
Sole tyre supplier Pirelli allocated the C3, C4, and C5 compounds of tyre to be used in the race.

=== Penalties ===
At the previous race in Italy, Max Verstappen and Lewis Hamilton made contact, and both retired from the race. The stewards investigated the incident and ruled that Verstappen was predominantly to blame, and awarded him a three-place grid penalty for this event.

== Practice ==
The first practice session started at 11:30 MST, on 24 September 2021, and ended with no major incidents. Lando Norris spun and grazed the wall on his in lap but he was able to get back to the pits. Valtteri Bottas finished first, with his Mercedes teammate Lewis Hamilton in second. Red Bull's Max Verstappen was third.

Free practice 2 started at 15:00 MST, on the same day. It ended with only 1 interruption. Antonio Giovinazzi spun and hit the wall, ending his session and causing a red flag. At the end of the session, AlphaTauri's Pierre Gasly ran over a curb and dislodged his front wing. No red flag was required because it was the end of the session. Bottas and Hamilton finished first and second again, with Gasly in third.

Free practice 3 was scheduled to start at 12:00 MST, on 25 September 2021, but it was cancelled due to adverse weather conditions.

== Qualifying ==
Qualifying started at 15:00 MST, on 25 September 2021. Lando Norris started on pole for the first time in his Formula One career, having set the fastest time on slick tyres on a drying track. The result was McLaren's first pole position since the 2012 Brazilian Grand Prix, and Norris became the 102nd driver in the history of the World Championship to achieve a pole position. Carlos Sainz Jr. of Ferrari qualified second to claim his first front-row start in Formula One. George Russell qualified 3rd for Williams, his second top-three starting position of the season, having previously qualified second for the Belgian Grand Prix. Hamilton, who topped the first two segments of qualifying, finished the session in fourth, having crashed into the wall on the pit lane entry when coming in to change from intermediate tyres to slick tyres. His car needed a new front wing, and he was unable to build enough temperature in his tyres for his final flying lap due to the lack of time left in the session, as well as having to move out of the way of cars on their fast laps. Hamilton's delayed stop also held up his teammate Valtteri Bottas, who had also come into the pits for slick tyres. Bottas qualified seventh. The other McLaren of Daniel Ricciardo qualified 5th. Charles Leclerc and Nicholas Latifi did not set lap times in the second segment of qualifying due to engine penalties that demoted them to the back of the grid, regardless of their qualifying results. Championship leader Max Verstappen did not set a lap time in the first segment for the same reason.

=== Qualifying classification ===
Pos.	No.	Driver	Constructor	Qualifying times			Final grid
Pos.	No.	Driver	Constructor	Q1	Q2	Q3	Final grid
1	4	(United Kingdom) Lando Norris	McLaren-Mercedes	1:47.238	1:45.827	1:41.993	1
2	55	(Spain) Carlos Sainz Jr.	Ferrari	1:47.924	1:46.521	1:42.510	2
3	63	(United Kingdom) George Russell	Williams-Mercedes	1:48.303	1:46.435	1:42.983	3
4	44	(United Kingdom) Lewis Hamilton	Mercedes	1:45.992	1:45.129	1:44.050	4
5	3	(Australia) Daniel Ricciardo	McLaren-Mercedes	1:48.345	1:46.361	1:44.156	5
6	14	(Spain) Fernando Alonso	Alpine-Renault	1:47.877	1:45.514	1:44.204	6
7	77	(Finland) Valtteri Bottas	Mercedes	1:46.396	1:45.306	1:44.710	16^{1}
8	18	(Canada) Lance Stroll	Aston Martin-Mercedes	1:48.322	1:46.360	1:44.956	7
9	11	(Mexico) Sergio Pérez	Red Bull Racing-Honda	1:46.455	1:45.834	1:45.337	8
10	31	(France) Esteban Ocon	Alpine-Renault	1:48.099	1:46.070	1:45.865	9
11	5	(Germany) Sebastian Vettel	Aston Martin-Mercedes	1:47.205	1:46.573	N/A	10
12	10	(France) Pierre Gasly	AlphaTauri-Honda	1:47.828	1:46.641	N/A	11
13	22	(Japan) Yuki Tsunoda	AlphaTauri-Honda	1:48.854	1:46.751	N/A	12
14	6	(Canada) Nicholas Latifi	Williams-Mercedes	1:48.252	No time	N/A	18^{2}
15	16	(Monaco) Charles Leclerc	Ferrari	1:48.470	No time	N/A	19^{3}
16	7	(Finland) Kimi Räikkönen	Alfa Romeo Racing-Ferrari	1:49.586	N/A	N/A	13
17	47	(Germany) Mick Schumacher	Haas-Ferrari	1:49.830	N/A	N/A	14
18	99	(Italy) Antonio Giovinazzi	Alfa Romeo Racing-Ferrari	1:51.023	N/A	N/A	17^{4}
19	9	(Russian Automobile Federation) Nikita Mazepin (Note: Nikita Mazepin is Russian, but he competed as a neutral competitor using the designation RAF (Russian Automobile Federation), as the Court of Arbitration for Sport upheld a ban on Russia competing at World Championships. The ban was implemented by the World Anti-Doping Agency in response to the state-sponsored doping program of Russian athletes.)	Haas-Ferrari	1:53.764	N/A	N/A	15
20	33	(Netherlands) Max Verstappen	Red Bull Racing-Honda	No time	N/A	N/A	20^{5}
107% time: 1:53.411^{6}

Notes

- ^1 – Valtteri Bottas received a 15-place grid penalty for exceeding his quota of power unit elements.
- ^2 – Nicholas Latifi was required to start the race from the back of the grid for exceeding his quota of power unit elements.
- ^3 – Charles Leclerc was required to start the race from the back of the grid for exceeding his quota of power unit elements.
- ^4 – Antonio Giovinazzi received a five-place grid penalty for unscheduled gearbox change. The penalty was nullified by penalties incurred by other drivers. As a result, he made a net gain of one place from his qualifying position.
- ^5 – Max Verstappen received a three-place grid penalty for causing a collision at the previous round. He was later required to start the race from the back of the grid for exceeding his quota of power unit elements. Verstappen neglected to set a qualifying time because of his penalties. However, the penalties did not affect his last position.
- ^6 – As qualifying was held on a wet track, the 107% rule was not in force.

== Race ==
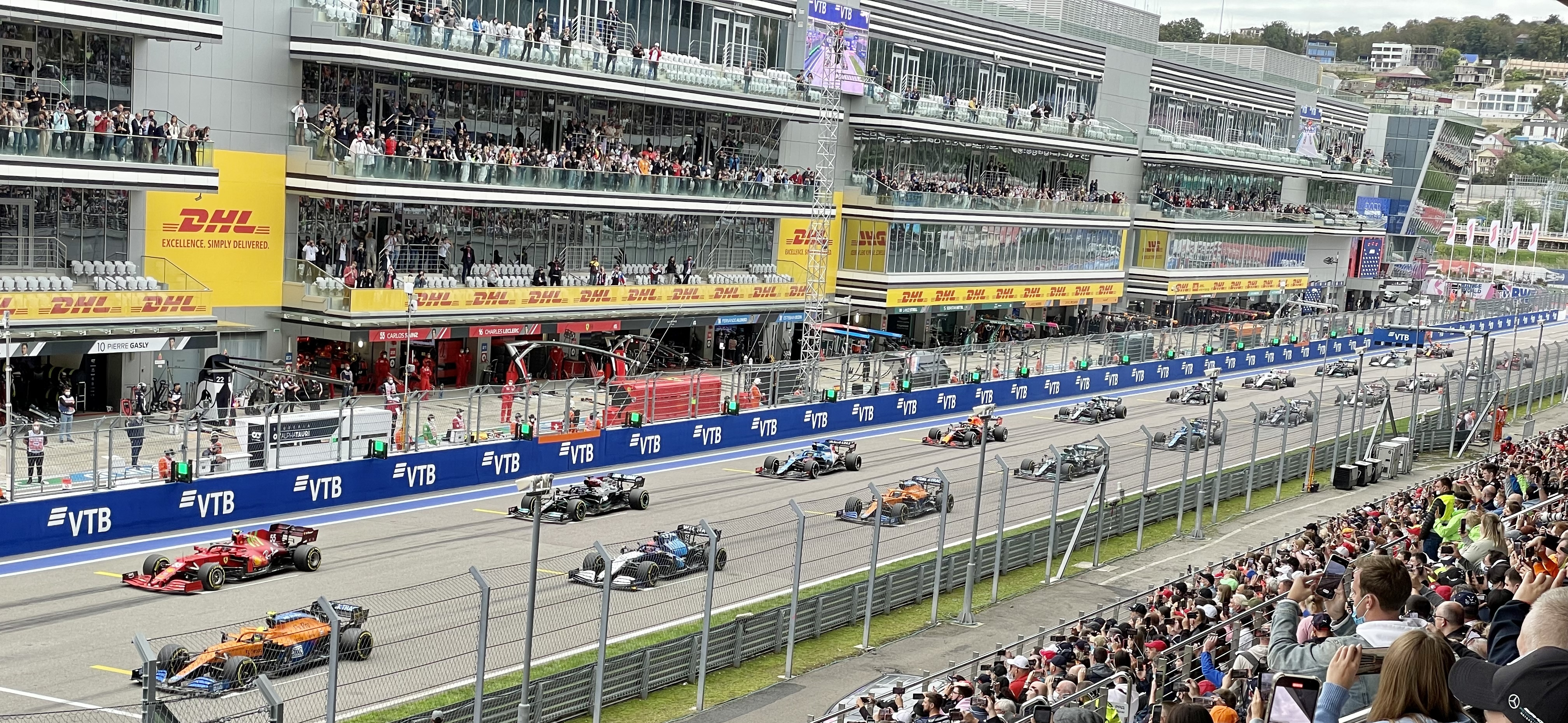
Cars on the starting grid

The race started at 15:00 MST, on 26 September 2021. Carlos Sainz Jr. took the lead from Lando Norris into turn two, while Lewis Hamilton fell down the order to sixth. Fernando Alonso overtook Hamilton at the start, but the latter re-overtook on the following lap by going around the outside of turn three. Charles Leclerc climbed up to twelfth after starting from nineteenth. On lap 13, Norris overtook Sainz through the left-hand sweep at turn 12, into the entry of turn 13. to retake first place, retaining the lead until the closing laps. After gaining three positions on the first lap, Max Verstappen climbed up the order into seventh. Hamilton recovered to second, coming within DRS range of Norris as rain began to fall on parts of the track. Kimi Räikkönen, George Russell, and Valtteri Bottas were the first to pit for intermediate tyres on lap 48, allowing all three drivers to move up into the points by race end. Further up the order, Verstappen and Daniel Ricciardo followed suit on lap 49, as did Sainz who had dropped from third to seventh in the deteriorating conditions. Hamilton initially stayed out to battle Norris for the lead before switching to intermediate tyres the following lap, after which it became clear the rain would continue. Sergio Pérez, Alonso, and Leclerc also chose to continue on slicks while in a close fight for third. Despite running off the track multiple times, Norris refused to stop for intermediates against the advice of his engineers, having accumulated a fifty-second gap over third place.

Hamilton emerged from the pits twenty-five seconds behind the race leader, closing to under two seconds on lap 51 before Norris aquaplaned off the track at turn 5, leaving Hamilton to take the lead and the win. Early stoppers Verstappen, Sainz, and Ricciardo overtook the three drivers running slicks and battling for third: Alonso and Pérez eventually pitted on lap 51, managing to stay in the points, but Leclerc continued on and fell from fourth to fifteenth in his final two laps. Norris finally entered the pits for intermediate tyres on lap 52; however, Norris aquaplaned on the pit entry and crossed the white line separating the pit lane entry from the track, for which he was reprimanded. Norris finished the race in seventh. Verstappen finished the race in second from 20th on the starting grid, and Sainz finished in third, taking his fifth Formula One podium. Hamilton's race victory made him the first driver in Formula One history to take 100 wins. Mercedes team member Tom Mason appeared on the podium to receive the winning manufacturer's award.

=== Post-race ===
Hamilton hailed his Mercedes team after securing his 100th win. Mercedes team boss Toto Wolff hailed Hamilton's achievement of 100 wins as "mindblowing". The 1998 and 1999 Formula One World Champion Mika Häkkinen felt patience was the key factor in Hamilton securing the race victory. Valtteri Bottas felt a podium would have been possible for him if he had pitted one lap earlier for intermediate tyres. Alonso also believed a podium had been possible on merit for him before the weather intervention. McLaren said it would launch a review of the procedures which contributed to Norris not pitting earlier for intermediate tyres when the rain started to fall. McLaren Team Principal Andreas Seidl said the team would also not dwell on what might or should have been. Norris said he was "not happy" with his result and stated he may have pitted for wet weather tyres had he been given clearer information on the weather by the team. Formula One Managing Director Ross Brawn praised Norris for his weekend performance, though felt his inexperience showed in the tricky conditions during the race. Brawn defended Norris, pointing out that there were occasions when drivers were correct to ignore team orders and follow their instincts. Brawn also praised Formula One veterans like Kimi Räikkönen, Alonso, and Hamilton for how they responded to the same situation.

Former Renault Formula One driver-turned-analyst and radio commentator Jolyon Palmer said he felt the responsibility for not pitting Norris soon enough for wet weather tyres lay with the McLaren team. Seven-times Grand Prix race winner Juan Pablo Montoya said that Norris's performance meant he now would know he could get the job done. Red Bull Racing hailed Verstappen's second-place finish from starting last on the grid as "like a victory". Alfa Romeo Racing team boss Frédéric Vasseur felt Norris should have been given a time penalty for his pit entry infringement. Journalist David Tremayne praised Norris for his performance and said Norris should learn and take heart from the experiences of past British Formula One champions, such as James Hunt, Nigel Mansell, and Damon Hill, all of whom had to deal with disappointment of near misses trying to get their first Grand Prix wins before achieving them.

=== Race classification ===
Pos.	No.	Driver	Constructor	Laps	Time/Retired	Grid	Points
1	44	(United Kingdom) Lewis Hamilton	Mercedes	53	1:30:41.001	4	25
2	33	(Netherlands) Max Verstappen	Red Bull Racing-Honda	53	+53.271	20	18
3	55	(Spain) Carlos Sainz Jr.	Ferrari	53	+1:02.475	2	15
4	3	(Australia) Daniel Ricciardo	McLaren-Mercedes	53	+1:05.607	5	12
5	77	(Finland) Valtteri Bottas	Mercedes	53	+1:07.533	16	10
6	14	(Spain) Fernando Alonso	Alpine-Renault	53	+1:21.321	6	8
7	4	(United Kingdom) Lando Norris	McLaren-Mercedes	53	+1:27.224	1	7^{a}
8	7	(Finland) Kimi Räikkönen	Alfa Romeo Racing-Ferrari	53	+1:28.955	13	4
9	11	(Mexico) Sergio Pérez	Red Bull Racing-Honda	53	+1:30.076	8	2
10	63	(United Kingdom) George Russell	Williams-Mercedes	53	+1:40.551	3	1
11	18	(Canada) Lance Stroll	Aston Martin-Mercedes	53	+1:56.198^{b}	7	
12	5	(Germany) Sebastian Vettel	Aston Martin-Mercedes	52	+1 lap	10	
13	10	(France) Pierre Gasly	AlphaTauri-Honda	52	+1 lap	11	
14	31	(France) Esteban Ocon	Alpine-Renault	52	+1 lap	9	
15	16	(Monaco) Charles Leclerc	Ferrari	52	+1 lap	19	
16	99	(Italy) Antonio Giovinazzi	Alfa Romeo Racing-Ferrari	52	+1 lap	17	
17	22	(Japan) Yuki Tsunoda	AlphaTauri-Honda	52	+1 lap	12	
18	9	(Russian Automobile Federation) Nikita Mazepin	Haas-Ferrari	51	+2 laps	15	
19^{c}	6	(Canada) Nicholas Latifi	Williams-Mercedes	47	Accident damage	18	
Ret	47	(Germany) Mick Schumacher	Haas-Ferrari	32	Oil leak	14	
Fastest lap: (United Kingdom) Lando Norris (McLaren-Mercedes) – 1:37.423 (lap 39)

Notes

- ^a – Includes one point for fastest lap.
- ^b – Lance Stroll received a post-race ten-second time penalty for causing a collision with Pierre Gasly. His final position was not affected by the penalty.
- ^c – Nicholas Latifi was classified, as he completed more than 90% of the race distance.

== Championship standings after the race ==
Drivers' Championship standings

	Pos.	Driver	Points
1	1	(United Kingdom) Lewis Hamilton	246.5
1	2	(Netherlands) Max Verstappen	244.5
Unchanged	3	(Finland) Valtteri Bottas	151
Unchanged	4	(United Kingdom) Lando Norris	139
Unchanged	5	(Mexico) Sergio Pérez	120

Constructors' Championship standings

	Pos.	Constructor	Points
Unchanged	1	(Germany) Mercedes	397.5
Unchanged	2	(Austria) Red Bull Racing-Honda	364.5
Unchanged	3	(United Kingdom) McLaren-Mercedes	234
Unchanged	4	(Italy) Ferrari	216.5
Unchanged	5	(France) Alpine-Renault	103

- Note: Only the top five positions are included for both sets of standings.

== See also ==
- 2021 Sochi Formula 2 round
- 2021 Sochi Formula 3 round

== Notes ==
Previous race: 2021 Italian Grand Prix	FIA Formula One World Championship; 2021 season	Next race: 2021 Turkish Grand Prix
Previous race: 2020 Russian Grand Prix	Russian Grand Prix	Next race: N/A
