= 2021 Italian Grand Prix =

14th round of the 2021 Formula One season

Race 14 of 22 in the 2021 Formula One World Championship
← Previous race	Next race →
- Layout of the Autodromo Nazionale Monza

Race details
- Date: 12 September 2021
- Official name: Formula 1 Heineken Gran Premio d'Italia 2021
- Location: Autodromo Nazionale Monza, Monza, Italy
- Course: Permanent racing facility
- Course length: 5.793 km (3.600 miles)
- Distance: 53 laps, 306.720 km (190.587 miles)
- Weather: Sunny

Pole position
Driver	(Netherlands) Max Verstappen (Note: Valtteri Bottas finished first in sprint qualifying but was required to start the race from the back of the grid for exceeding his quota of power unit elements. Max Verstappen was promoted to pole position in his place.)	Red Bull Racing-Honda
- Grid positions set by results of sprint qualifying

Fastest lap
Driver	(Australia) Daniel Ricciardo	McLaren-Mercedes
- Time: 1:24.812 on lap 53

Podium
First	(Australia) Daniel Ricciardo	McLaren-Mercedes
Second	(United Kingdom) Lando Norris	McLaren-Mercedes
Third	(Finland) Valtteri Bottas	Mercedes

The 2021 Italian Grand Prix (officially known as the Formula 1 Heineken Gran Premio d'Italia 2021) was a Formula One motor race held on 12 September 2021 at Autodromo Nazionale Monza. It was the 14th round of the 2021 Formula One World Championship and the second Grand Prix in Italy in the season, after the Emilia Romagna Grand Prix on 18 April. The 53 lap race was won by McLaren driver Daniel Ricciardo, who capitalised on a good front-row start and an accident between Max Verstappen and Lewis Hamilton to take the race lead. Ricciardo was joined by Lando Norris in second with Mercedes' Valtteri Bottas in third. It was Ricciardo's first victory since the 2018 Monaco Grand Prix, and his last victory as a whole. In addition, the race was McLaren's first Grand Prix victory since Jenson Button's victory at the 2012 Brazilian Grand Prix and the last until a victory for Norris at the 2024 Miami Grand Prix. This was also McLaren's first 1-2 finish since the 2010 Canadian Grand Prix, and also McLaren's first win at Monza since the 2012 Italian Grand Prix and first double podium since the 2014 Australian Grand Prix. As of 2025, this is the final Grand Prix appearance for Robert Kubica. It was also the last win for an Australian driver until Oscar Piastri at the 2024 Hungarian Grand Prix.

== Background ==
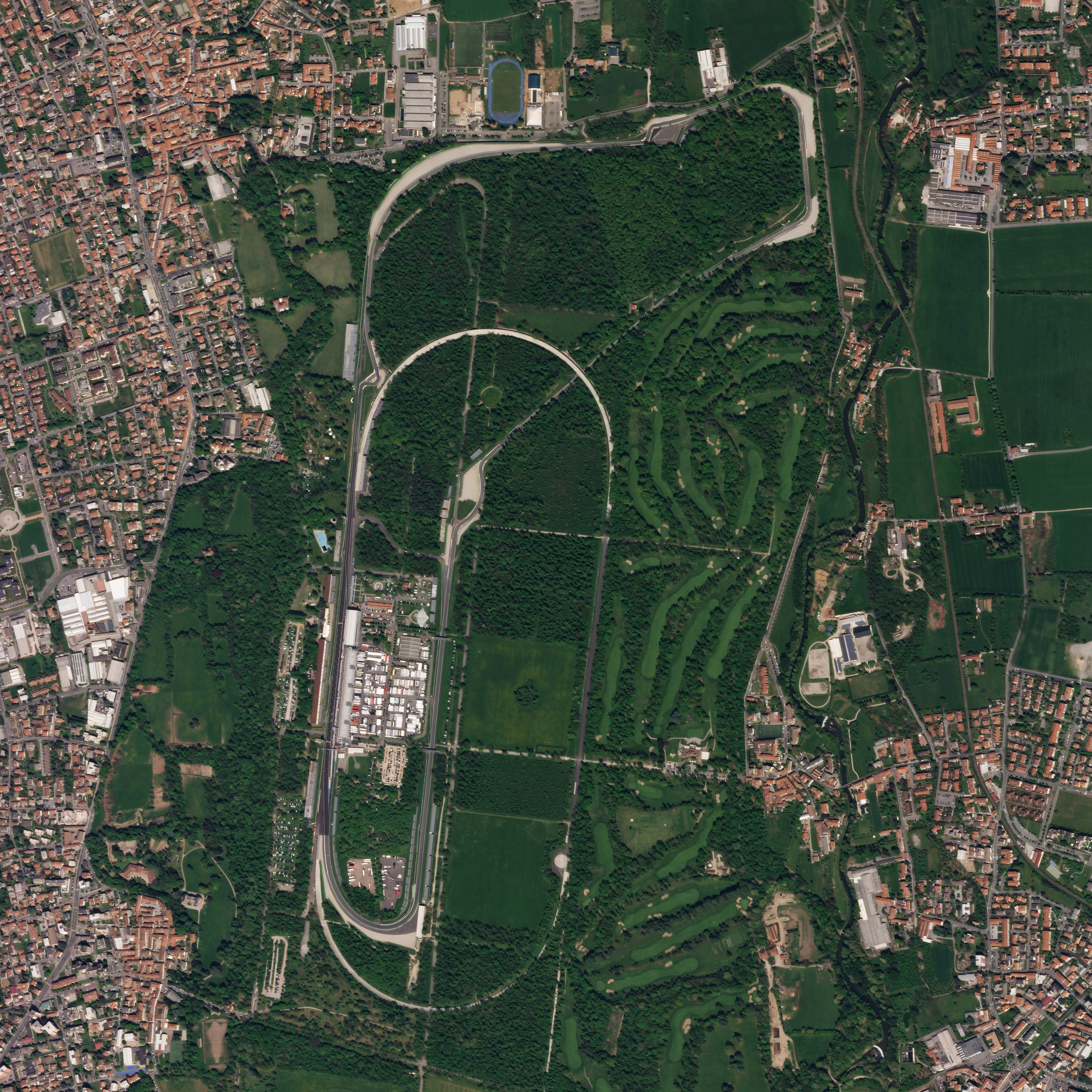
Satellite view of Autodromo Nazionale Monza.

The event, held over the weekend of 10–12 September at the Autodromo Nazionale Monza, was the fourteenth round of the 2021 World Championship. The race took place one week after the Dutch Grand Prix and preceded the Russian Grand Prix. Pierre Gasly is the previous race winner, having won the 2020 event.

=== Championship standings before the race ===
After Max Verstappen's win at the Dutch Grand Prix, he took the lead of the Drivers' Championship with 224.5 points. He led Lewis Hamilton by three points. Valtteri Bottas' third place at the previous race saw him jump Lando Norris, leaving Bottas in third, trailing his teammate by 98.5 points. Norris was fourth, on 114 points, while Sergio Pérez was fifth, eight points behind Norris.

Mercedes retained their lead of the Constructors' Championship, leading Red Bull by 12 points. After a double points finish, Ferrari jumped McLaren into third place, with McLaren 11.5 points behind. Alpine stayed fifth, 80 points behind McLaren.

=== Entrants ===
The drivers and teams were the same as the season entry list with the only exception being Kimi Räikkönen, who was replaced by Robert Kubica, as was the case in the preceding Dutch Grand Prix, when Räikkönen tested positive for coronavirus.

=== Tyre choices ===
Sole tyre supplier Pirelli allocated the C2, C3, and C4 compounds of tyre to be used in the race.

=== Weekend format ===
The event was the second, of three, to implement a trial weekend format. The first race to use this format occurred during the British Grand Prix. The change in format means that Free Practice 1 and Qualifying took place on the Friday. Free Practice 2 and sprint qualifying took place on the Saturday, while the race is the sole event on the Sunday.

The sprint qualifying is a 100 km (62 mi) race which would decide the starting order for the race on Sunday, for this event this is equivalent to 18 laps. The grid order for sprint qualifying was decided via the normal Q1, Q2, Q3 qualifying session. The final classification of the sprint qualifying race would be the starting grid for the race. The winner of the sprint qualifying would be on pole. Additionally, sprint qualifying awards points to the top three finishers: 3 for 1st, 2 for 2nd, and 1 for 3rd. The maximum time limit is 60 minutes, and normal fuel flow limits still apply. The top three in sprint qualifying would also be given a victory parade and special wreaths for their efforts.

== Practice ==
Free Practice 1 took place at 14:30 CEST on 10 September. The first practice ended with no major incidents. Lewis Hamilton set the fastest time, with Max Verstappen in second and Valtteri Bottas in third.

Free Practice 2 took place at 12:00 CEST on 11 September. The first practice ended with one interruption. The red flag was brought out when Carlos Sainz Jr. spun and crashed at the Ascari chicane. He said over the radio that it "hurt" but he was cleared during the precautionary checks. The other Ferrari of Charles Leclerc, had to stop his session early because he was feeling unwell. His situation was monitored by medical staff and ultimately, he was cleared to take part in the Sprint. The session ended with Hamilton in first, Bottas in second and Verstappen in third.

== Qualifying ==
Qualifying took place at 18:00 CEST on 10 September. All three parts of qualifying ended with no major incidents. At the end of the first part of qualifying, Lewis Hamilton was fastest, with Valtteri Bottas second and Lando Norris third. The second part of qualifying saw Hamilton, Bottas and Norris go first, second and third, respectively. The final part of qualifying saw Bottas go fastest, with Hamilton second and Max Verstappen third.

=== Qualifying classification ===
Pos.	No.	Driver	Constructor	Qualifying times			SQ grid
Pos.	No.	Driver	Constructor	Q1	Q2	Q3	SQ grid
1	77	(Finland) Valtteri Bottas	Mercedes	1:20.685	1:20.032	1:19.555	1
2	44	(United Kingdom) Lewis Hamilton	Mercedes	1:20.543	1:19.936	1:19.651	2
3	33	(Netherlands) Max Verstappen	Red Bull Racing-Honda	1:21.035	1:20.229	1:19.966	3
4	4	(United Kingdom) Lando Norris	McLaren-Mercedes	1:20.916	1:20.059	1:19.989	4
5	3	(Australia) Daniel Ricciardo	McLaren-Mercedes	1:21.292	1:20.435	1:19.995	5
6	10	(France) Pierre Gasly	AlphaTauri-Honda	1:21.440	1:20.556	1:20.260	6
7	55	(Spain) Carlos Sainz Jr.	Ferrari	1:21.118	1:20.750	1:20.462	7
8	16	(Monaco) Charles Leclerc	Ferrari	1:21.219	1:20.767	1:20.510	8
9	11	(Mexico) Sergio Pérez	Red Bull Racing-Honda	1:21.308	1:20.882	1:20.611	9
10	99	(Italy) Antonio Giovinazzi	Alfa Romeo Racing-Ferrari	1:21.197	1:20.726	1:20.808	10
11	5	(Germany) Sebastian Vettel	Aston Martin-Mercedes	1:21.394	1:20.913	N/A	11
12	18	(Canada) Lance Stroll	Aston Martin-Mercedes	1:21.415	1:21.020	N/A	12
13	14	(Spain) Fernando Alonso	Alpine-Renault	1:21.487	1:21.069	N/A	13
14	31	(France) Esteban Ocon	Alpine-Renault	1:21.500	1:21.103	N/A	14
15	63	(United Kingdom) George Russell	Williams-Mercedes	1:21.890	1:21.392	N/A	15
16	6	(Canada) Nicholas Latifi	Williams-Mercedes	1:21.925	N/A	N/A	16
17	22	(Japan) Yuki Tsunoda	AlphaTauri-Honda	1:21.973	N/A	N/A	17
18	47	(Germany) Mick Schumacher	Haas-Ferrari	1:22.248	N/A	N/A	18
19	88	(Poland) Robert Kubica	Alfa Romeo Racing-Ferrari	1:22.530	N/A	N/A	19
20	9	(Russian Automobile Federation) Nikita Mazepin (Note: Nikita Mazepin is Russian, but he competed as a neutral competitor using the designation RAF (Russian Automobile Federation), as the Court of Arbitration for Sport upheld a ban on Russia competing at World Championships. The ban was implemented by the World Anti-Doping Agency in response to the state-sponsored doping program of Russian athletes.)	Haas-Ferrari	1:22.716	N/A	N/A	20
107% time: 1:26.181

== Sprint qualifying ==
Sprint qualifying took place at 16:30 CEST on 11 September. Valtteri Bottas kept first from the start and led all laps of the race. Lewis Hamilton lost four places at the second corner. He managed to make up one place, due to Pierre Gasly crashing out at Curva Grande. Gasly's crash was caused by contact with Daniel Ricciardo. The damage meant Gasly's front wing came off and subsequently went under his car, bouncing him through the gravel and into the wall. The stewards deemed it a racing incident and didn't apportion blame for the contact. The safety car was deployed due to this crash. Yuki Tsunoda and Robert Kubica also made contact on lap 1, resulting in Tsunoda losing his front wing and Kubica spinning into the gravel. Both drivers were able to carry on.

After lap 1, the positions of the top 8 drivers did not change. The session ended with Valtteri Bottas, Max Verstappen, and Daniel Ricciardo finishing on the top three positions respectively. However, while Bottas finished first in sprint qualifying, Verstappen took pole position for the race, due to Bottas having a penalty for exceeding his quota of engine components, which demoted him to 19th. Ricciardo and his McLaren teammate, Lando Norris, was promoted to second and third for the grid respectively.

In the aftermath of the sprint qualifying, Sergio Pérez criticised the format, saying the sprint at Monza was "very boring" and did not add anything. Formula One managing director Ross Brawn defended it, saying there was "plenty of action". Fernando Alonso advocated for single lap qualifying (the qualifying system in Formula One previously used from the start of the 2003 season to end of the 2005 season) as a method of setting the grid for sprint qualifying.

=== Sprint qualifying classification ===
Pos.	No.	Driver	Constructor	Laps	Time/Retired	Grid	Points	Final grid
1	77	(Finland) Valtteri Bottas	Mercedes	18	27:54.078	1	3	19^{a}
2	33	(Netherlands) Max Verstappen	Red Bull Racing-Honda	18	+2.325	3	2	1
3	3	(Australia) Daniel Ricciardo	McLaren-Mercedes	18	+14.534	5	1	2
4	4	(United Kingdom) Lando Norris	McLaren-Mercedes	18	+18.835	4		3
5	44	(United Kingdom) Lewis Hamilton	Mercedes	18	+20.011	2		4
6	16	(Monaco) Charles Leclerc	Ferrari	18	+23.442	8		5
7	55	(Spain) Carlos Sainz Jr.	Ferrari	18	+27.952	7		6
8	99	(Italy) Antonio Giovinazzi	Alfa Romeo Racing-Ferrari	18	+31.089	10		7
9	11	(Mexico) Sergio Pérez	Red Bull Racing-Honda	18	+31.680	9		8
10	18	(Canada) Lance Stroll	Aston Martin-Mercedes	18	+38.671	12		9
11	14	(Spain) Fernando Alonso	Alpine-Renault	18	+39.795	13		10
12	5	(Germany) Sebastian Vettel	Aston Martin-Mercedes	18	+41.177	11		11
13	31	(France) Esteban Ocon	Alpine-Renault	18	+43.373	14		12
14	6	(Canada) Nicholas Latifi	Williams-Mercedes	18	+45.977	16		13
15	63	(United Kingdom) George Russell	Williams-Mercedes	18	+46.821	15		14
16	22	(Japan) Yuki Tsunoda	AlphaTauri-Honda	18	+49.977	17		15
17	9	(Russian Automobile Federation) Nikita Mazepin	Haas-Ferrari	18	+1:02.599	20		16
18	88	(Poland) Robert Kubica	Alfa Romeo Racing-Ferrari	18	+1:05.096	19		17
19	47	(Germany) Mick Schumacher	Haas-Ferrari	18	+1:06.154	18		18
Ret	10	(France) Pierre Gasly	AlphaTauri-Honda	0	Accident	6		PL^{b}
Fastest lap: (Netherlands) Max Verstappen (Red Bull Racing-Honda) – 1:23.502 (lap 9)

Notes

- ^a – Valtteri Bottas won the sprint, but he was required to start the race from the back of the grid for exceeding his quota of power unit elements.
- ^b – Pierre Gasly received a five-place grid penalty for an unscheduled gearbox change. He was also required to start the race from the back of the grid for exceeding his quota of power unit elements. He was then required to start the race from the pit lane for a new energy store specification.

== Race ==
The race started at 15:00 CEST on 12 September. Daniel Ricciardo overtook Max Verstappen for the lead while Lewis Hamilton passed Lando Norris to take third. Hamilton attempted an overtake on Verstappen into turn 4, but was pushed wide, causing him to lose his position to Norris. Further down the grid, Antonio Giovinazzi went off the track at turn 5 and rejoined the track into the path of Carlos Sainz Jr., with the two making contact. Giovinazzi was spun around and clipped the barrier, losing his front wing. Giovinazzi was given a 5-second time penalty for rejoining the track in an unsafe manner. Ricciardo held Verstappen behind for 21 laps, until he pitted for hard tyres on lap 22. Verstappen entered the pits on the next lap, but was held for 11.1 seconds due to an issue with the right front tyre. While Verstappen was in the pits, Hamilton overtook Norris, prompting Norris to pit. Norris came out of the pits ahead of Verstappen, and Hamilton pitted for medium tyres on the following lap. Hamilton's stop was also slow, being stationary for 4.2 seconds. Due to this, Norris was able to overtake him, and Hamilton ended up side-by-side with Verstappen on the pit exit and into turn 1. Verstappen was squeezed into turn 2, bouncing over a sausage kerb and making contact with Hamilton's left rear tyre, launching Verstappen's car into the air and over the top of Hamilton's car. Both drivers were uninjured, but were forced to retire from the race. This was Hamilton's first retirement in 63 races, the previous being the 2018 Austrian Grand Prix.

The crash brought out the safety car. Charles Leclerc and George Russell took advantage by pitting during the safety car period, resulting in Leclerc and Russell exiting the pits in second and ninth, respectively. On the safety car restart, Norris overtook Leclerc to move up into second place. A few laps later, Sergio Pérez attempted an overtake on Leclerc into turn 4, but went off the track; Pérez took third place from Leclerc, but was given a 5-second time penalty for leaving the track and gaining an advantage. On lap 32 Nikita Mazepin attempted an overtake on his teammate Mick Schumacher and collided with Schumacher, spinning him around. Mazepin was handed a 5-second time penalty for the incident. Mazepin suffered a damaged front wing and a flat-spotted tyre from the incident and eventually retired on lap 42 due to a power unit failure. On lap 34, Valtteri Bottas overtook Leclerc to take fourth place. Pérez held off Bottas until the end of the race, but dropped to fifth after the race due to his penalty.

Ricciardo finished first, winning his first race since the 2018 Monaco Grand Prix, and taking the first win for McLaren since Jenson Button did so for the team at the 2012 Brazilian Grand Prix. Norris finished second, making it a one-two finish for McLaren; their first since the 2010 Canadian Grand Prix when Lewis Hamilton and Jenson Button were driving for the team. Bottas rounded out the podium places, finishing the race in third. Damage to his Aston Martin's front wing meant that Sebastian Vettel could not finish higher than twelfth. Kubica's fourteenth-place finish allowed him to move ahead of Nikita Mazepin into twentieth place in the Drivers' Championship standings.

=== Post-race ===
After the race, Verstappen and Hamilton were summoned to the stewards regarding their crash. The stewards ruled that Verstappen was predominantly at fault and awarded him a three-place grid penalty for the following race in Sochi, as well as two penalty points on his Super Licence. Hamilton said he was proud of the stewards for being willing to give Verstappen a penalty for the incident. Three-time Formula One World Champion Sir Jackie Stewart criticised Verstappen's behaviour following the incident with Hamilton, saying he was "taking longer than expected to mature". The FIA announced it would carry out a safety investigation into the Hamilton-Verstappen crash after considering it an 'unusual incident'. Meanwhile, race winner Ricciardo stated that that was the first time he had ever been overwhelmed by winning, especially considering he had been consistently outperformed by teammate Lando Norris in the first half of the season. Norris himself felt he could have challenged Ricciardo, but decided it would be in the best interests of the McLaren team not to, fearing challenging his teammate could have resulted in a Hamilton-Verstappen-style crash between the pair.

=== Race classification ===
Pos.	No.	Driver	Constructor	Laps	Time/Retired	Grid	Points
1	3	(Australia) Daniel Ricciardo	McLaren-Mercedes	53	1:21:54.365	2	26^{1}
2	4	(United Kingdom) Lando Norris	McLaren-Mercedes	53	+1.747	3	18
3	77	(Finland) Valtteri Bottas	Mercedes	53	+4.921	19	15
4	16	(Monaco) Charles Leclerc	Ferrari	53	+7.309	5	12
5	11	(Mexico) Sergio Pérez	Red Bull Racing-Honda	53	+8.723^{2}	8	10
6	55	(Spain) Carlos Sainz Jr.	Ferrari	53	+10.535	6	8
7	18	(Canada) Lance Stroll	Aston Martin-Mercedes	53	+15.804	9	6
8	14	(Spain) Fernando Alonso	Alpine-Renault	53	+17.201	10	4
9	63	(United Kingdom) George Russell	Williams-Mercedes	53	+19.742	14	2
10	31	(France) Esteban Ocon	Alpine-Renault	53	+20.868	12	1
11	6	(Canada) Nicholas Latifi	Williams-Mercedes	53	+23.743	13	
12	5	(Germany) Sebastian Vettel	Aston Martin-Mercedes	53	+24.621	11	
13	99	(Italy) Antonio Giovinazzi	Alfa Romeo Racing-Ferrari	53	+27.216	7	
14	88	(Poland) Robert Kubica	Alfa Romeo Racing-Ferrari	53	+29.769	17	
15	47	(Germany) Mick Schumacher	Haas-Ferrari	53	+51.088	18	
Ret	9	(Russian Automobile Federation) Nikita Mazepin	Haas-Ferrari	41	Power unit	16	
Ret	44	(United Kingdom) Lewis Hamilton	Mercedes	25	Collision	4	
Ret	33	(Netherlands) Max Verstappen	Red Bull Racing-Honda	25	Collision	1	
Ret	10	(France) Pierre Gasly	AlphaTauri-Honda	3	Suspension	PL	
DNS	22	(Japan) Yuki Tsunoda	AlphaTauri-Honda		Brakes	—^{3}	
Fastest lap: (Australia) Daniel Ricciardo (McLaren-Mercedes) – 1:24.812 (lap 53)

Notes

- ^1 – Includes one point for fastest lap.
- ^2 – Sergio Pérez finished third, but received a five-second time penalty for leaving the track and gaining an advantage.
- ^3 – Yuki Tsunoda did not start the race. His place on the grid was left vacant.

== Championship standings after the race ==
Drivers' Championship standings

	Pos.	Driver	Points
Unchanged	1	(Netherlands) Max Verstappen	226.5
Unchanged	2	(United Kingdom) Lewis Hamilton	221.5
Unchanged	3	(Finland) Valtteri Bottas	141
Unchanged	4	(United Kingdom) Lando Norris	132
Unchanged	5	(Mexico) Sergio Pérez	118

Constructors' Championship standings

	Pos.	Constructor	Points
Unchanged	1	(Germany) Mercedes	362.5
Unchanged	2	(Austria) Red Bull Racing-Honda	344.5
1	3	(United Kingdom) McLaren-Mercedes	215
1	4	(Italy) Ferrari	201.5
Unchanged	5	(France) Alpine-Renault	95

- Note: Only the top five positions are included for both sets of standings.

== See also ==
- 2021 Monza Formula 2 round

== Notes ==
Previous race: 2021 Dutch Grand Prix	FIA Formula One World Championship; 2021 season	Next race: 2021 Russian Grand Prix
Previous race: 2020 Italian Grand Prix	Italian Grand Prix	Next race: 2022 Italian Grand Prix
