= Haas VF-22 =

Haas F1 Team's 2022 Formula One racing car

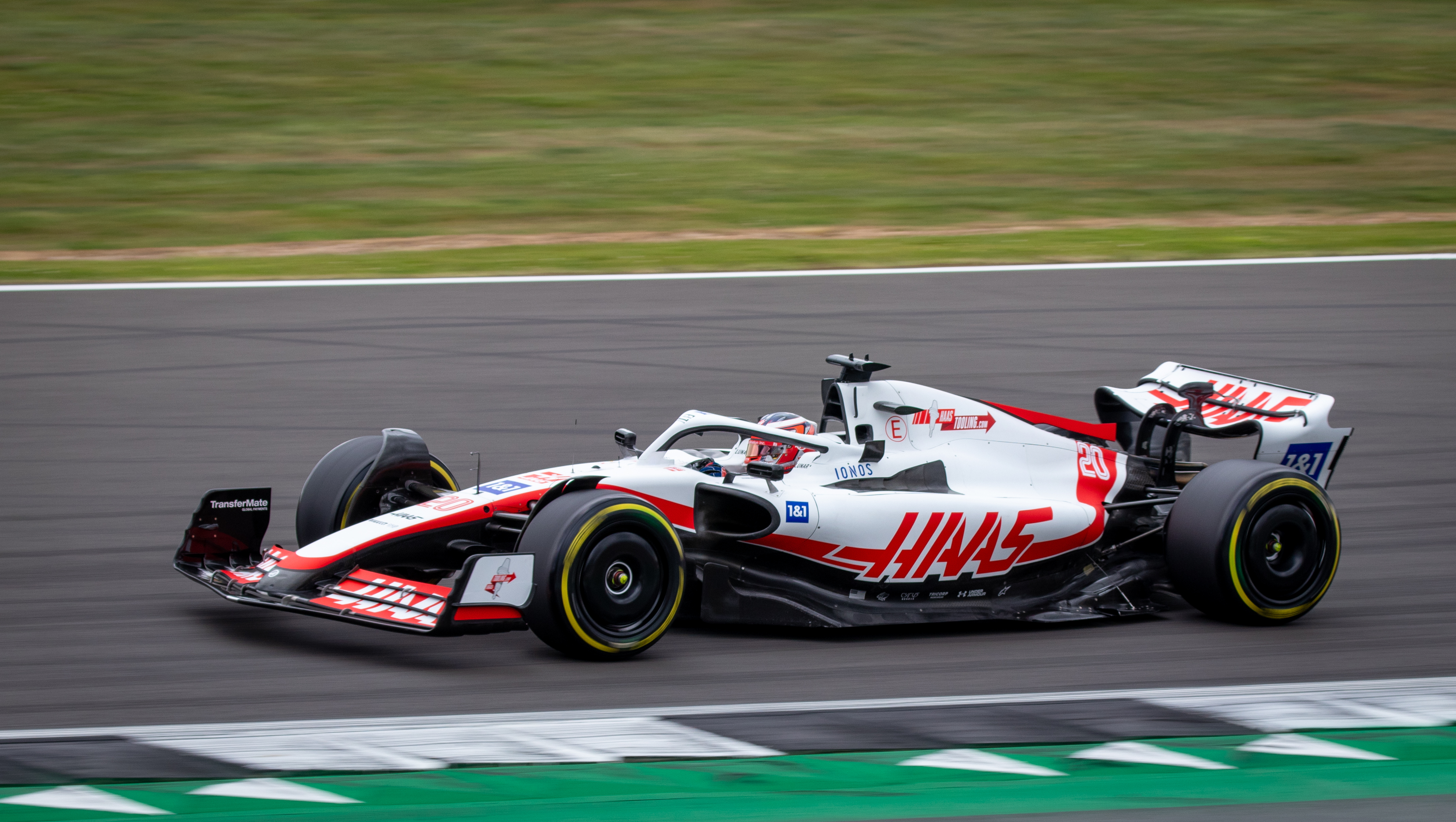
- Kevin Magnussen driving the Haas VF-22 at the British Grand Prix
- Category: Formula One
- Constructor: Haas F1 Team
- Designers: Simone Resta (Technical Director); Andrea De Zordo (Chief Designer); Matteo Piraccini (Head of Chassis Design); Maurizio Bocchi (Performance Development Manager); Damien Brayshaw (Head of Vehicle Performance); Arron Melvin (Head of Aerodynamics); Davide Paganelli (Head of Aerodynamic Operations)
- Predecessor: Haas VF-21
- Successor: Haas VF-23

Technical specifications
- Chassis: Carbon-fibre and honeycomb composite
- Suspension (front): Double wishbone, push-rod
- Suspension (rear): Double wishbone, pull-rod
- Width: 2,000 mm (79 in)
- Engine: Ferrari 066/7 1.6 L (98 cu in) direct injection V6 turbocharged engine limited to 15,000 RPM in a mid-mounted, rear-wheel drive layout 1.6 V6
- Electric motor: Kinetic and thermal energy recovery systems
- Transmission: Ferrari 8 speed + 1 reverse
- Weight: 795 kg (1,753 lb)
- Brakes: 6 piston carbon disk brakes
- Tyres: Pirelli P Zero (dry); Pirelli Cinturato (wet)

Competition history
- Notable entrants: Haas F1 Team
- Notable drivers: 20. (Denmark) Kevin Magnussen; 47. (Germany) Mick Schumacher
- Debut: 2022 Bahrain Grand Prix
- Last event: 2022 Abu Dhabi Grand Prix
Races	Wins	Podiums	Poles	F/Laps
22	0	0	1	0

The Haas VF-22 is a Formula One racing car designed and constructed by the Haas F1 Team to compete in the 2022 Formula One World Championship. The VF-22 is Haas' seventh car entry into Formula One. It has been driven by Kevin Magnussen, Mick Schumacher, and Nikita Mazepin, the lattermost who was replaced by Magnussen before the season-opening Bahrain Grand Prix. The car runs on power units supplied by Ferrari.

The VF-22 was the first Formula One car of 2022 to be revealed pre-season. Due to the major change to the Formula One regulations which affected the appearance of the cars, development on the VF-21 used in the 2021 season was cut short, and the team instead focused on the 2022 season.

This car is notable for being the first ever Haas Formula One car to take a pole position, in the hands of Magnussen, at the 2022 São Paulo Grand Prix at Interlagos. Haas had an overall improved season, moving up from 10th in the constructors championship to 8th and back to scoring points regularly.

== Development ==
Haas did not develop its previous car in 2021 and instead focused on the VF-22 during the whole 2021 championship due to a regulation change. For a seventh consecutive year, Haas selected a Ferrari engine for its car. On 4 February, the VF-22 became the first 2022 car to be revealed.

== Livery ==
The car was revealed and initially tested in a livery similar to the previous season's VF-21, with the title sponsorship from Russian company Uralkali and designs across the car, particularly on the front wing, resembling the Russian flag. Following the 2022 Russian invasion of Ukraine on 24 February, Haas removed the Uralkali branding from their car and website. The final day of the first pre-season test on 25 February was run with the car carrying a modified black-and-white livery. The sponsorship was later terminated along with Mazepin's contract on 5 March. An updated livery with the colour red replacing the Russian flag stripe, was used during the second test in Bahrain.

== Competition history ==
Magnussen drove the car to 7th in qualifying and finished 5th in the Bahrain Grand Prix. In the same race, Schumacher placed 12th in qualifying and 11th in the actual race.

The following weekend in Saudi Arabia, Magnussen qualified 10th and finished 9th. Schumacher's VF-22 lost back end control after hitting a curb in Q2, and hitting a wall. While Schumacher sustained no injuries, the damages to the VF-22 were estimated at $1M. Only one VF-22 raced the following day.

At Imola, Magnussen scored points in both the sprint race and full Grand Prix with an 8th and 9th-place finish respectively. The following races would prove barren for both drivers, including a large crash for Schumacher at Monaco where his car split in two after an incident in the Swimming Pool section of the circuit.

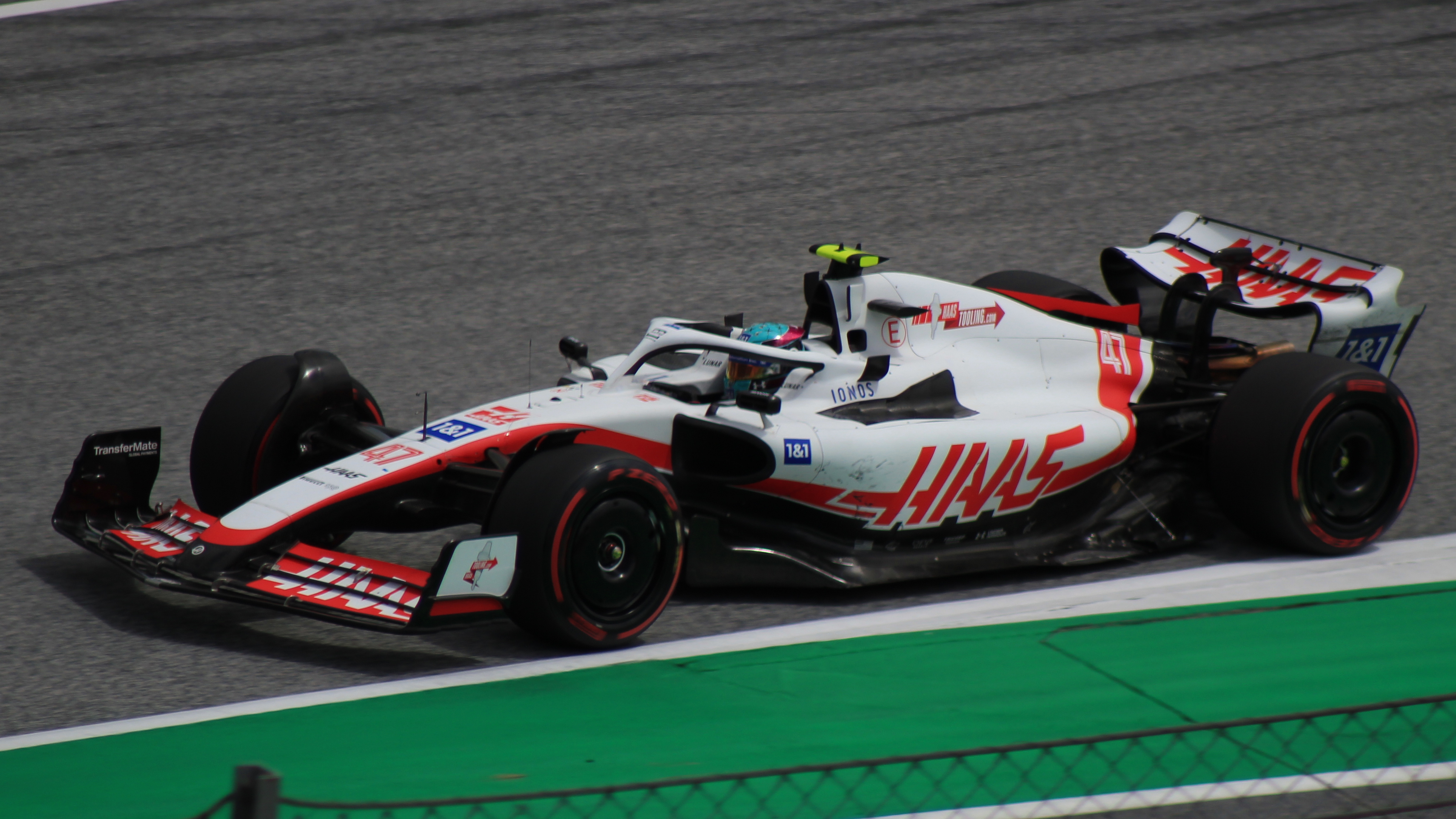
Schumacher at the Austrian Grand Prix, where he finished sixth

At the British Grand Prix Mick Schumacher scored his first Formula One points driving the VF-22 finishing in 8th place. Magnussen was 10th. At the following round in Austria, Schumacher finished in 6th. Teammate Kevin Magnussen also scored points in Austria in both sprint and Grand Prix races.

At the São Paulo Grand Prix, Kevin Magnussen took the team's as well as his first pole position. Haas became the first US-based constructor to take pole since Shadow Racing Cars at the 1975 British Grand Prix.

== Complete Formula One results ==
Key

Key
Colour	Result
Gold	Winner
Silver	Second place
Bronze	Third place
Green	Other points position
Blue	Other classified position
Blue	Not classified, finished (NC)
Purple	Not classified, retired (Ret)
Red	Did not qualify (DNQ)
Black	Disqualified (DSQ)
White	Did not start (DNS)
White	Race cancelled (C)
Blank	Did not practice (DNP)
Blank	Excluded (EX)
Blank	Did not arrive (DNA)
Blank	Withdrawn (WD)
Blank	Did not enter (empty cell)
Annotation	Meaning
P	Pole position
F	Fastest lap
Superscript number	Points-scoring position in sprint

Year	Entrant	Power unit	Tyres	Driver name	Grands Prix																						Points	WCC pos.
Year	Entrant	Power unit	Tyres	Driver name	BHR	SAU	AUS	EMI	MIA	ESP	MON	AZE	CAN	GBR	AUT	FRA	HUN	BEL	NED	ITA	SIN	JPN	USA	MXC	SAP	ABU	Points	WCC pos.
2022	Haas F1 Team	Ferrari 066/7	P	(Denmark) Kevin Magnussen	5	9	14	9^{8}	16†	17	Ret	Ret	17	10	8^{7}	Ret	16	16	15	16	12	14	9	17	Ret^{P 8}	17	37	8th
2022	Haas F1 Team	Ferrari 066/7	P	(Germany) Mick Schumacher	11	WD	13	17	15	14	Ret	14	Ret	8	6	15	14	17	13	12	13	17	15	16	13	16	37	8th
