= Haas VF-23 =

2023 Formula One racing car

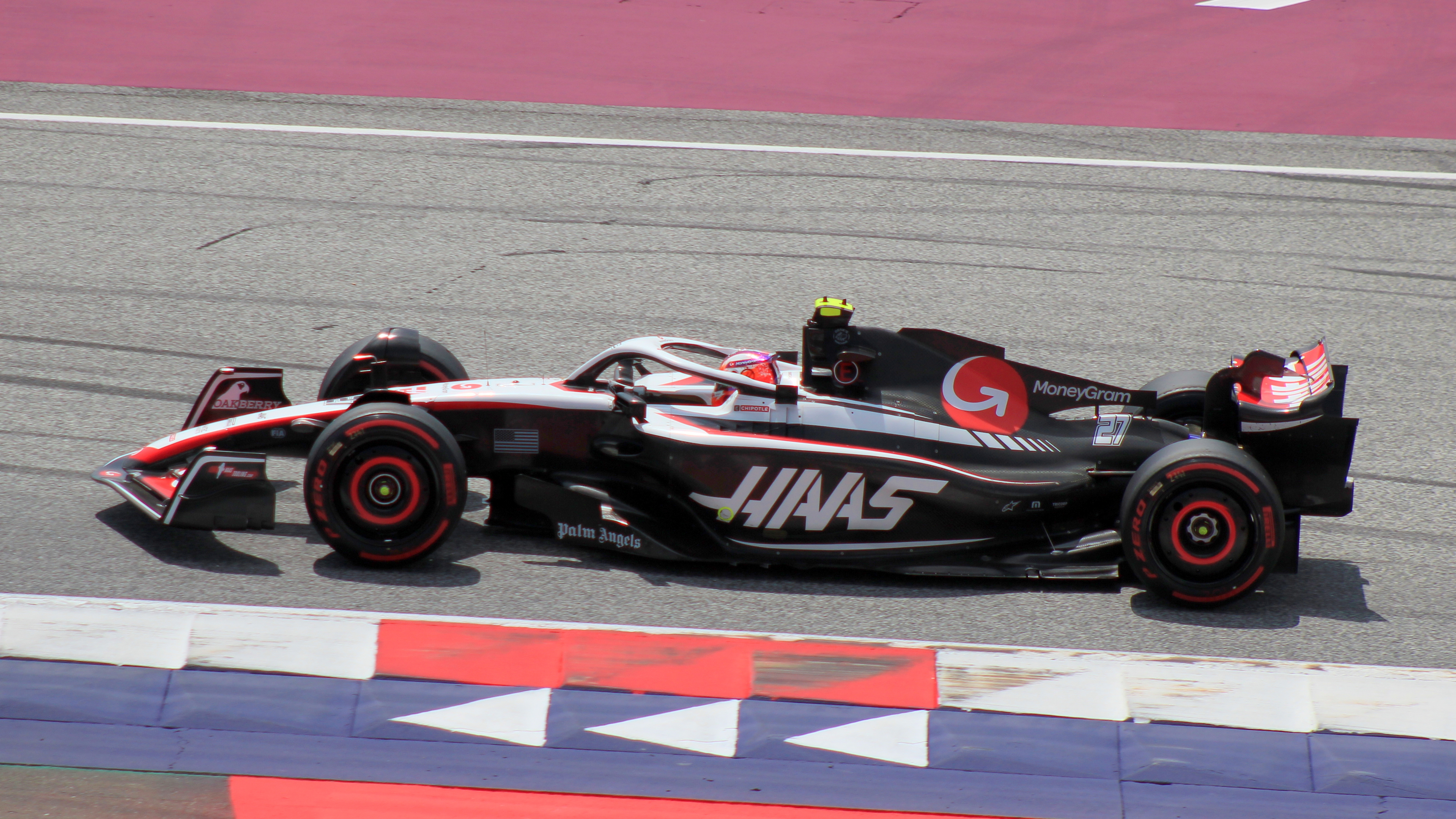
- Nico Hülkenberg driving a VF-23 during the Austrian Grand Prix
- Category: Formula One
- Designers: Simone Resta (Technical Director); Andrea De Zordo (Chief Designer); Matteo Piraccini (Head of Chassis Design); Maurizio Bocchi (Performance Development Manager); Damien Brayshaw (Head of Vehicle Performance); Arron Melvin (Head of Aerodynamics); Davide Paganelli (Head of Aerodynamic Operations)
- Predecessor: Haas VF-22
- Successor: Haas VF-24

Technical specifications
- Chassis: Carbon fibre composite
- Engine: Ferrari
- Electric motor: MGU-H and MGU-K kinetic/thermal energy recovery motor
- Transmission: 8 drive gears – 1 reverse gear Single-clutch sequential
- Tyres: Pirelli P Zero (Dry/Slick); Pirelli Cinturato (Wet/Treaded)
- Clutch: Single-clutch

Competition history
- Notable entrants: MoneyGram Haas F1 Team
- Notable drivers: 20. (Denmark) Kevin Magnussen; 27. (Germany) Nico Hülkenberg
- Debut: 2023 Bahrain Grand Prix
- Last event: 2023 Abu Dhabi Grand Prix
Races	Wins	Podiums	Poles	F/Laps
22	0	0	0	0

The Haas VF-23 is a race car built by Haas F1 Team that competed in the 2023 Formula One World Championship. In December 2022, the car became the first of the 2023 models to pass FIA homologation. The VF-23 was driven by Kevin Magnussen for his second consecutive year with the team, having also raced for them from 2017 to 2020 and Nico Hülkenberg, who returned to Formula One in 2023 after 3 years without a full-time race contract.

== Sponsorship and livery ==
Haas revealed the livery of the car on January 31, 2023. The livery integrates the branding of MoneyGram International Inc., the team's third title sponsor after Rich Energy and Uralkali, which was first announced at the 2022 United States Grand Prix. Furthermore, the team announced a partnership with Chipotle Mexican Grill ahead of the 2023 championship on February 16, 2023. During the three American Grands Prix – Miami, Austin and Las Vegas – the Chipotle Mexican Grill logo will feature on both the nose and side of the VF-23.

The livery is colored in red, white and black, all key colors for both team title sponsor MoneyGram and the MoneyGram Haas F1 Team, and the first time Haas had utilized a predominantly dark color scheme for their car since the Haas VF-19.

For the United States Grand Prix, Haas's home race, the two VF-23 cars featured a celebratory livery, distinguished by the addition of horizontal white and red stripes and red and blue stars running along the entire length of the sidepods, inspired by the U.S. national flag as well as the phrase "We The People," the opening words of the Preamble to the United States Constitution.

== Racing performance ==
=== First 10 races ===
Magnussen qualified 17th for the first race in Bahrain whilst Hülkenberg qualified 10th on his full time return to Formula One. Magnussen finished 13th whilst Hülkenberg, who got a 15-second time penalty for track limit violations, finished in 15th place. Hülkenberg qualified 11th and Magnussen qualified 13th in Jeddah. In the race Hülkenberg finished 12th whilst Magnussen scored the team's first point of the season by finishing 10th.

Hülkenberg qualified 10th for the Australian Grand Prix whilst Magnussen qualified 14th. Hülkenberg ran in the top 10 and even had a wheel to wheel battle with Lando Norris whilst Magnussen ran out of the points for most of the race. Late in the race Magnussen hit the wall, retiring his car and causing a red flag. Hülkenberg sat 7th at the restart but the restart was chaotic where many other cars were eliminated, meaning when the race was red flagged again, Hülkenberg was running 4th in the order and with Carlos Sainz receiving a penalty for colliding with Fernando Alonso, Haas thought their first (and Hülkenberg's first) podium was on the cards, but then it transpired that since the cars hadn't gone far enough for a restart order to be established, Hülkenberg was placed back to P7 in the order which he finished due to the race finishing behind the safety car. Haas protested the decision to reset the order but the protest was rejected as no new evidence could be given that the stewards had made a mistake denying Haas a first F1 podium. After the first 3 races Haas sat 7th in the constructors' championship with 7 points; 6 scored by Hülkenberg, one scored by Magnussen.

Hülkenberg and Magnussen qualified 17th and 18th respectively for the Azerbaijan Grand Prix. The first sprint qualifying went better with the drivers qualifying 12th (Hülkenberg) and 14th (Magnussen) respectively. Magnussen finished the sprint 11th whilst Hülkenberg ended the shorter race 15th. Magnussen finished the main race in 13th whilst Hülkenberg finished 17th. At the Miami Grand Prix Hülkenberg suffered a crash in FP1 putting him on the back foot. Hülkenberg would qualify 12th for the race whilst Magnussen qualified a brilliant 4th place, his highest grid slot since his pole at the 2022 Sao Paulo Grand Prix. Hülkenberg finished the race a difficult 15th whilst Magnussen finished 10th scoring a point for the team. Haas left the first 5 races 7th in the championship with 8 points.

Monaco however was a disaster as Magnussen qualified 17th and Hülkenberg qualified 18th. The race would be even worse as Hülkenberg collided with Logan Sargeant earning him a penalty limiting him to 17th place whilst Magnussen retired on lap 70 with damage after hitting the wall at Rascasse due to a late rain shower. Magnussen was knocked out in Q1 in Spain, whilst Hülkenberg qualified a brilliant 8th place. The race however was a disaster as Hülkenberg's tyres wore out dropping him to 15th at the flag whilst Magnussen struggled to 18th place. Magnussen qualified 14th for the Canadian Grand Prix whilst Hülkenberg qualified 2nd meaning he would start on the front row but was penalised for a red flag infringement dropping him to 5th on the grid. Like in Spain Hülkenberg's tyres wore out dropping him down to 15th at the flag again. Magnussen during the race got involved in an incident with Nyck de Vries where the Dutchman locked up forcing him and Magnussen down the escape road at turn 2 ending Magnussen's chance for points meaning he finished in 17th place.

Magnussen was knocked out in Q1, qualifying 19th for the second sprint weekend in Austria whilst Hülkenberg again impressed by qualifying 8th for the main race. Hülkenberg qualified 4th for the sprint with Magnussen qualifying 10th, the team's first double Q3 appearance for any sprint or race in the season. Magnussen fell back to 14th in the sprint whilst Hülkenberg ran in second for a few laps before slipping back to sixth but he scored his first points since Australia. In the main race Hülkenberg would retire early on with an engine failure whilst Magnussen got involved in another incident with Nyck de Vries where the AlphaTauri driver pushed him off the track at turn 6 but he would finish 18th after a 5-second time penalty for track limit violations. Magnussen again struggled in qualifying for the British Grand Prix qualifying 19th due to an engine failure but gained a position due to Valtteri Bottas's disqualification from qualifying, whilst Hülkenberg qualified 11th. Neither driver would score points in the race as Magnussen retired with another engine failure whilst Hülkenberg finished 13th.

After the first 10 races Haas were 8th in the constructors' championship with 11 points level with Williams but behind on countback. Hülkenberg sat 14th in the drivers' championship with 9 points, whilst Magnussen was 18th with 2 points.

=== Hungary to Italy: A barren run ===
Magnussen's qualifying struggles continued in Hungary as he qualified 19th whilst Hülkenberg qualified 10th. Hülkenberg finished the race 14th whilst Magnussen finished 17th. Hülkenberg qualified last for the Belgian Grand Prix after a hydraulic issue meant it was too late to set another lap whilst Magnussen qualified 13th. For the sprint Hülkenberg ended up last after failing to set a time due to the team having issues with the front jack whilst Magnussen qualified 18th for the shorter race. Magnussen finished the sprint 14th with Hülkenberg finishing 17th. Magnussen finished the main race 15th with Hülkenberg finishing 18th and last of the runners. Haas ended the first half of the season 8th in the constructors' championship with 11 points with Hülkenberg still 14th in the drivers' championship and Magnussen still 19th in the drivers' championship.

Magnussen qualified 18th for the Dutch Grand Prix whilst Hülkenberg qualified 15th. Hülkenberg finished the main race in 12th whilst Magnussen finished a disappointing 16th place.

Magnussen qualified a poor 19th at Monza with Hülkenberg qualifying 13th. But in the race both drivers slipped back a lap behind with Hülkenberg finishing 17th and Magnussen finishing 18th. After Monza the team were holding 8th on countback to Alfa Romeo.

=== Singapore to Qatar: results get worse ===
Magnussen and Hülkenberg qualified 6th and 9th respectively for the Singapore Grand Prix. This marked the team's best qualifying of the season. Hülkenberg finished 13th after a failed double stack but Magnussen finished 10th scoring his first point since Miami after benefitting from George Russell crashing out on the last lap. This extended the gap over Alfa Romeo to 1 point in the fight for 8th in the constructors' championship.

Hülkenberg qualified 18th for the Japanese Grand Prix whilst Magnussen qualified 15th. During the race Magnussen was spun around by Sergio Pérez leading to a 15th-place finish whilst Hülkenberg had a quite race finishing 14th.

In Qatar Magnussen again qualified 19th whilst Hülkenberg qualified 16th, with Magnussen again qualifying 19th for the sprint whilst Hülkenberg qualified a brilliant 7th. Magnussen had a quiet sprint finishing 13th, Hülkenberg however retired with damage after Esteban Ocon collided with him damaging his suspension forcing him to retire. Magnussen and Hülkenberg finished 14th and 16th in the main race respectively but due to Alfa Romeo's double points finish they fell behind them meaning they left Qatar 9th in the constructors' championship 6 points ahead of AlphaTauri.

=== USA to Abu Dhabi: upgrades fail and the team slip to last ===
Haas bought some upgrades for their home race in Austin but in qualifying Hülkenberg qualified a shocking 16th and Magnussen ended up 14th. For the sprint Hülkenberg again qualified 16th whilst Magnussen qualified 17th. Hülkenberg finished the sprint 15th whilst Magnussen finished 18th. In the main race both cars started from the pit lane and Magnussen drove to 16th whilst Hülkenberg finished 13th but they moved up two places when Lewis Hamilton and Charles Leclerc were disqualified for plank wear violations meaning Magnussen ended up 14th and Hülkenberg ended up 11th. But AlphaTauri were now 1 point behind them in the fight for 9th in the constructors' championship.

Magnussen qualified 17th for the Mexico City Grand Prix with Hülkenberg qualifying 12th. Halfway through the race Magnussen ran off track and damaged his rear suspension which later failed sending him into the wall at turn 9 leading to a red flag. Hülkenberg meanwhile had a great race trying to hold onto to 10th place but slipped back to 13th finishing without points. Due to Daniel Ricciardo's 7th-place finish AlphaTauri overtook Haas in the constructors' championship, dropping them to 10th and last in the standings. Brazil qualifying saw Hülkenberg end up with 11th and Magnussen end up 14th. Sprint qualifying saw Magnussen 11th and Hülkenberg 12th. The sprint would see Hülkenberg finish 18th and Magnussen 16th but the main race was a disaster as Hülkenberg got sandwiched between Magnussen and Alex Albon sending Albon spinning into Magnussen causing both cars to go heavily into the wall ending both drivers races. Hülkenberg ended up 12th but still didn't score meaning the team remained in last place in the constructors' championship.

At the first ever Las Vegas Grand Prix Magnussen qualified 9th whilst Hülkenberg qualified 13th. Magnussen slipped back to 13th place whilst Hülkenberg retired with an engine failure.

For the season finale in Abu Dhabi Hülkenberg qualified 8th whilst Magnussen qualified 17th. Magnussen finished the race 20th and last a lap down whilst Hülkenberg slipped to 15th. This meant Haas couldn't pass Alfa Romeo for 9th in the constructors' championship, finishing 4 points behind the Swiss team.

Haas finished 2023 10th and last in the constructors' championship with 12 points with Hülkenberg's 7th place at the Australian Grand Prix being their best result. Hülkenberg finished his first full time season back in F1 16th in the drivers' championship with 9 points with Magnussen a disappointing 19th in the championship with 3 points compared to 25 the previous season. The team's last place finish was a result of the VF-23's great qualifying pace which Hülkenberg showed many times with 8 Q3 appearances across the season but high tyre wear during the races forcing multiple pit stops, losing the drivers time or the drivers would struggle with the tyres during races meaning the drivers were sitting ducks on the straights. The best example was Canada where Hülkenberg qualified 5th but slipped to 15th due to the cars high tyre wear. The upgrades at the United States Grand Prix were intended to combat this issue but the upgrades did not work forcing the team to revert to the old spec car meaning them finishing last in the constructors' championship for the second time in 3 seasons was something the team had to accept by the Sao Paulo Grand Prix.

== Later use ==
The VF-23 was run in a private test at Circuito de Jerez in January 2025 for Haas drivers Esteban Ocon and Oliver Bearman, as well as Toyota Gazoo Racing driver Ritomo Miyata as part of a technical partnership between Toyota and Haas. In September 2025, former Haas driver Romain Grosjean was announced to be driving the Haas VF-23, marking his return to Formula One machinery following his 2020 crash.

== Complete Formula One results ==
Key

Key
Colour	Result
Gold	Winner
Silver	Second place
Bronze	Third place
Green	Other points position
Blue	Other classified position
Blue	Not classified, finished (NC)
Purple	Not classified, retired (Ret)
Red	Did not qualify (DNQ)
Black	Disqualified (DSQ)
White	Did not start (DNS)
White	Race cancelled (C)
Blank	Did not practice (DNP)
Blank	Excluded (EX)
Blank	Did not arrive (DNA)
Blank	Withdrawn (WD)
Blank	Did not enter (empty cell)
Annotation	Meaning
P	Pole position
F	Fastest lap
Superscript number	Points-scoring position in sprint

Year	Entrant	Power unit	Tyres	Driver name	Grands Prix																						Points	WCC pos.
Year	Entrant	Power unit	Tyres	Driver name	BHR	SAU	AUS	AZE	MIA	MON	ESP	CAN	AUT	GBR	HUN	BEL	NED	ITA	SIN	JPN	QAT	USA	MXC	SAP	LVG	ABU	Points	WCC pos.
2023	MoneyGram Haas F1 Team	Ferrari 066/10	P	(Germany) Nico Hülkenberg	15	12	7	17	15	17	15	15	Ret^{6}	13	14	18	12	17	13	14	16	11	13	12	19†	15	12	10th
2023	MoneyGram Haas F1 Team	Ferrari 066/10	P	(Denmark) Kevin Magnussen	13	10	17†	13	10	19†	18	17	18	Ret	17	15	16	18	10	15	14	14	Ret	Ret	13	20	12	10th
