= Haas VF-21 =

2021 Formula One racing car

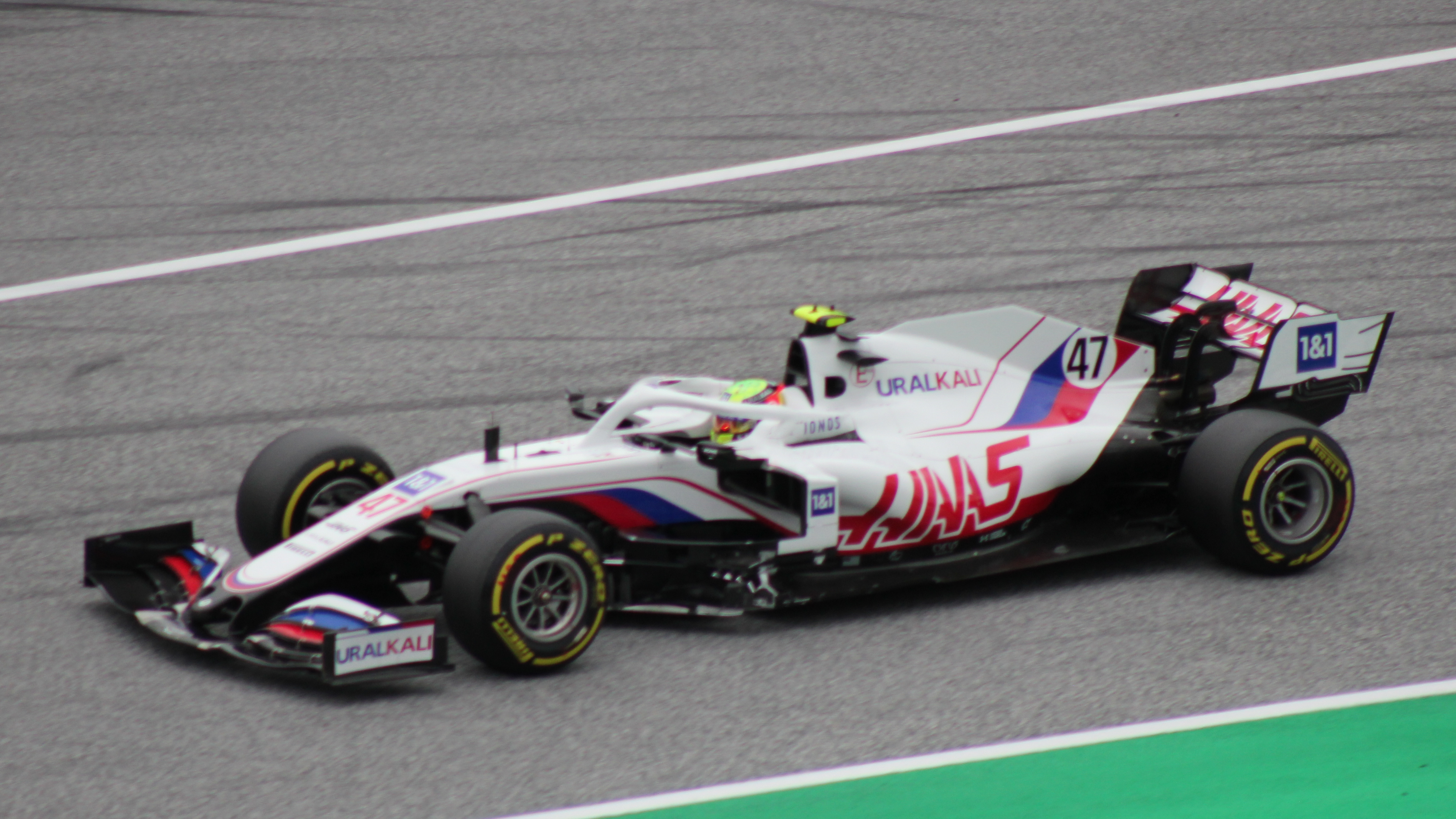
- Mick Schumacher in the VF-21 during practice at the Austrian Grand Prix
- Category: Formula One
- Constructor: Haas F1 Team
- Designers: Simone Resta (Technical Director); Matteo Piraccini (Head of Chassis Design); Andrea De Zordo (Chief Designer); Maurizio Bocchi (Performance Development Manager); Damien Brayshaw (Head of Vehicle Performance); Arron Melvin (Head of Aerodynamics); Davide Paganelli (Head of Aerodynamic Operations)
- Predecessor: Haas VF-20
- Successor: Haas VF-22

Technical specifications
- Engine: Ferrari 065/6 1.6 litre V6
- Tyres: Pirelli

Competition history
- Notable entrants: Uralkali Haas F1 Team
- Notable drivers: 9. (Russian Automobile Federation) Nikita Mazepin; 47. (Germany) Mick Schumacher
- Debut: 2021 Bahrain Grand Prix
- Last event: 2021 Abu Dhabi Grand Prix
Races	Wins	Podiums	Poles	F/Laps
22	0	0	0	0

The Haas VF-21 is a Formula One racing car designed and constructed by Haas to compete during the 2021 Formula One World Championship. The car was driven by Nikita Mazepin and Mick Schumacher, both of whom competed in their first season, with additional testing work carried out by Pietro Fittipaldi and Kevin Magnussen.

== Design and development ==
The Haas VF-21 was powered by the 2021 Ferrari power unit, the 065/6. Ferrari developed an in-season engine upgrade which was introduced to the works team at the Turkish Grand Prix. Haas declined to take the upgrade.

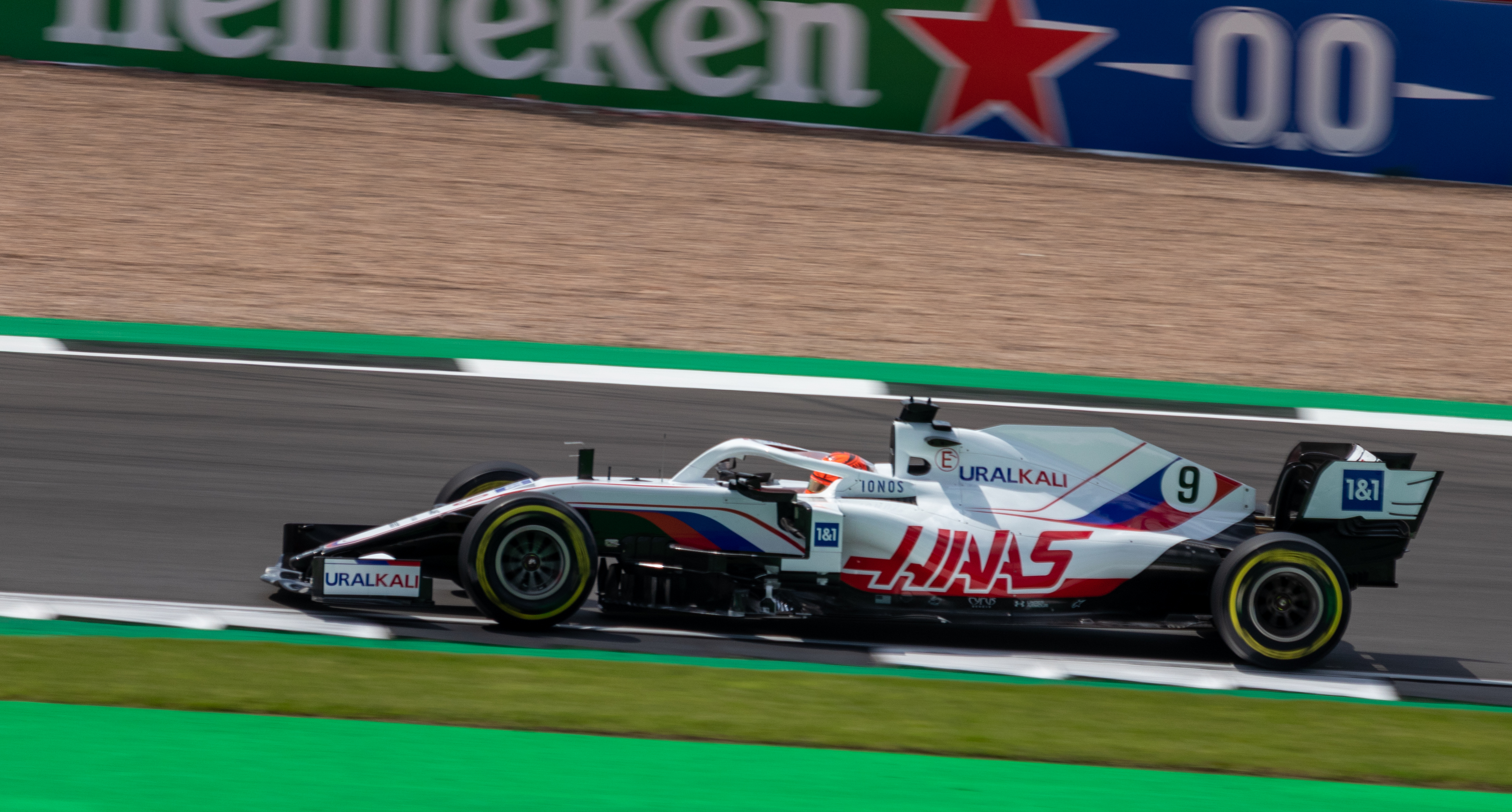
Mazepin at the British Grand Prix

The VF-21 chassis used in the 2021 season are modified VF-20 chassis, rather than new vehicles. The chassis, as it was raced at the Bahrain Grand Prix, was identical to the VF-20 except for the downforce cuts mandated by the 2021 regulations.

Haas introduced an upgrade package for the chassis at the Emilia Romagna Grand Prix, which would be the one and only change to the chassis in 2021. The upgrade package was not significant enough to require spending development tokens (introduced for development from 2020 to 2021 as a cost-saving measure), meaning Haas was the only constructor not to make any significant changes to its 2020 vehicle. Haas constructed a new chassis for Mazepin which was put into use at the Belgian Grand Prix.

== Livery ==
When the car's livery was revealed, it was a cause for controversy as it appeared to feature the Russian flag (due to the team having a Russian title sponsor and driver, Uralkali and Nikita Mazepin respectively). Guenther Steiner, the Haas team principal, stated that "it's the athlete who can't display the Russian flag, not the team. The team is an American team."

== Complete Formula One results ==
(key)

Year	Entrant	Power unit	Tyres	Driver name	Grands Prix																						Points	WCC pos.
Year	Entrant	Power unit	Tyres	Driver name	BHR	EMI	POR	ESP	MON	AZE	FRA	STY	AUT	GBR	HUN	BEL	NED	ITA	RUS	TUR	USA	MXC	SAP	QAT	SAU	ABU	Points	WCC pos.
2021	Uralkali Haas F1 Team	Ferrari 065/6; 1.6 V6 t	P	(Russian Automobile Federation) Nikita Mazepin	Ret	17	19	19	17	14	20	18	19	17	Ret	17	Ret	Ret	18	20	17	18	17	18	Ret	WD	0	10th
2021	Uralkali Haas F1 Team	Ferrari 065/6; 1.6 V6 t	P	(Germany) Mick Schumacher	16	16	17	18	18	13	19	16	18	18	12	16	18	15	Ret	19	16	Ret	18	16	Ret	14	0	10th

Notes

- † Driver failed to finish the race, but was classified as they had completed over 90% of the winner's race distance.
