= Haas VF-24 =

2024 Formula One car

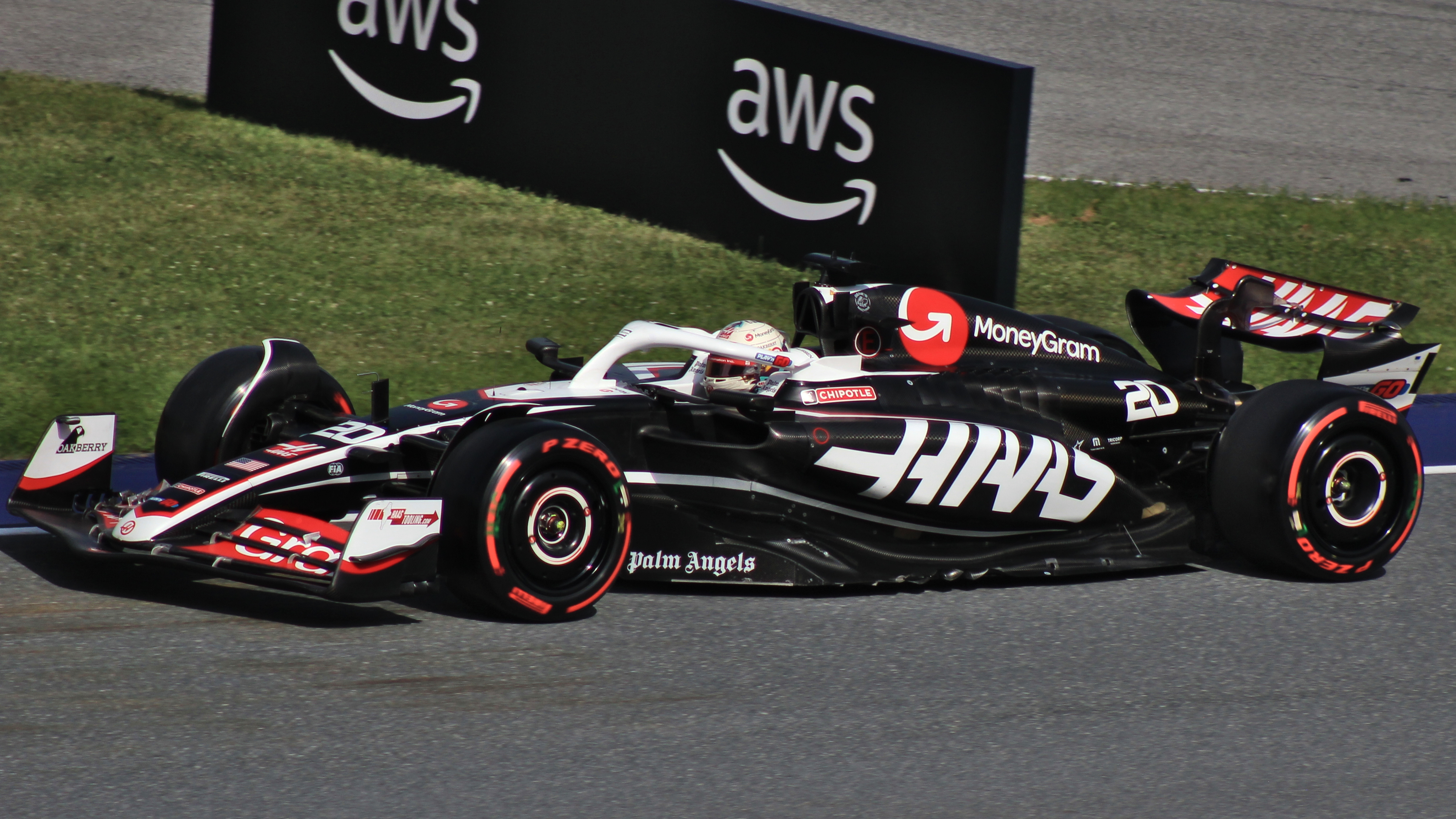
- A VF-24 driven by Kevin Magnussen during the Austrian Grand Prix
- Category: Formula One
- Constructor: Haas F1 Team
- Designers: Simone Resta (Technical Director); Andrea De Zordo (Chief Designer); Matteo Piraccini (Head of Chassis Design); Maurizio Bocchi (Performance Development Manager); Damien Brayshaw (Head of Vehicle Performance); Davide Paganelli (Head of Aerodynamics)
- Predecessor: Haas VF-23
- Successor: Haas VF-25

Technical specifications
- Chassis: Carbon-fibre and honeycomb composite
- Suspension (front): Double wishbone, push-rod
- Suspension (rear): Double wishbone, pull-rod
- Width: 2,000 mm (79 in)
- Engine: Ferrari 066/10 1.6 L (98 cu in) direct injection V6 turbocharged engine limited to 15,000 RPM in a mid-mounted, rear-wheel drive layout 1.6 V6
- Electric motor: Kinetic and thermal energy recovery systems
- Transmission: Ferrari 8 speed + 1 reverse
- Fuel: Shell
- Lubricants: Shell
- Brakes: 6 piston carbon disk brakes
- Tyres: Pirelli P Zero (dry); Pirelli Cinturato (wet)

Competition history
- Notable entrants: MoneyGram Haas F1 Team
- Notable drivers: 20. (Denmark) Kevin Magnussen; 27. (Germany) Nico Hülkenberg; 50. (United Kingdom) Oliver Bearman
- Debut: 2024 Bahrain Grand Prix
- Last event: 2024 Abu Dhabi Grand Prix
Races	Wins	Podiums	Poles	F/Laps
24	0	0	0	1

The Haas VF-24 is a Formula One racing car designed and constructed by the Haas F1 Team to compete in the 2024 Formula One World Championship. It was driven by Kevin Magnussen, Nico Hülkenberg and reserve driver Oliver Bearman, the former two drivers in their last year with Haas and the latter driving the car for four practice sessions and two Grands Prix: the first in Azerbaijan while Magnussen served a one-race ban, and the second during the São Paulo Grand Prix while Magnussen was unwell. An improvement over its predecessor, it scored one fastest lap, and achieved a highest finish of sixth.

== Livery ==
Haas continued the similar black and white livery for 2024 season with subtle changes while retaining MoneyGram as a title sponsor for the second year. Haas raced with an American flag inspired special livery at the United States Grand Prix. The team supported a technical partnership with Toyota Gazoo Racing and promoted the film Venom: The Last Dance at the same event.

== Competitive history ==
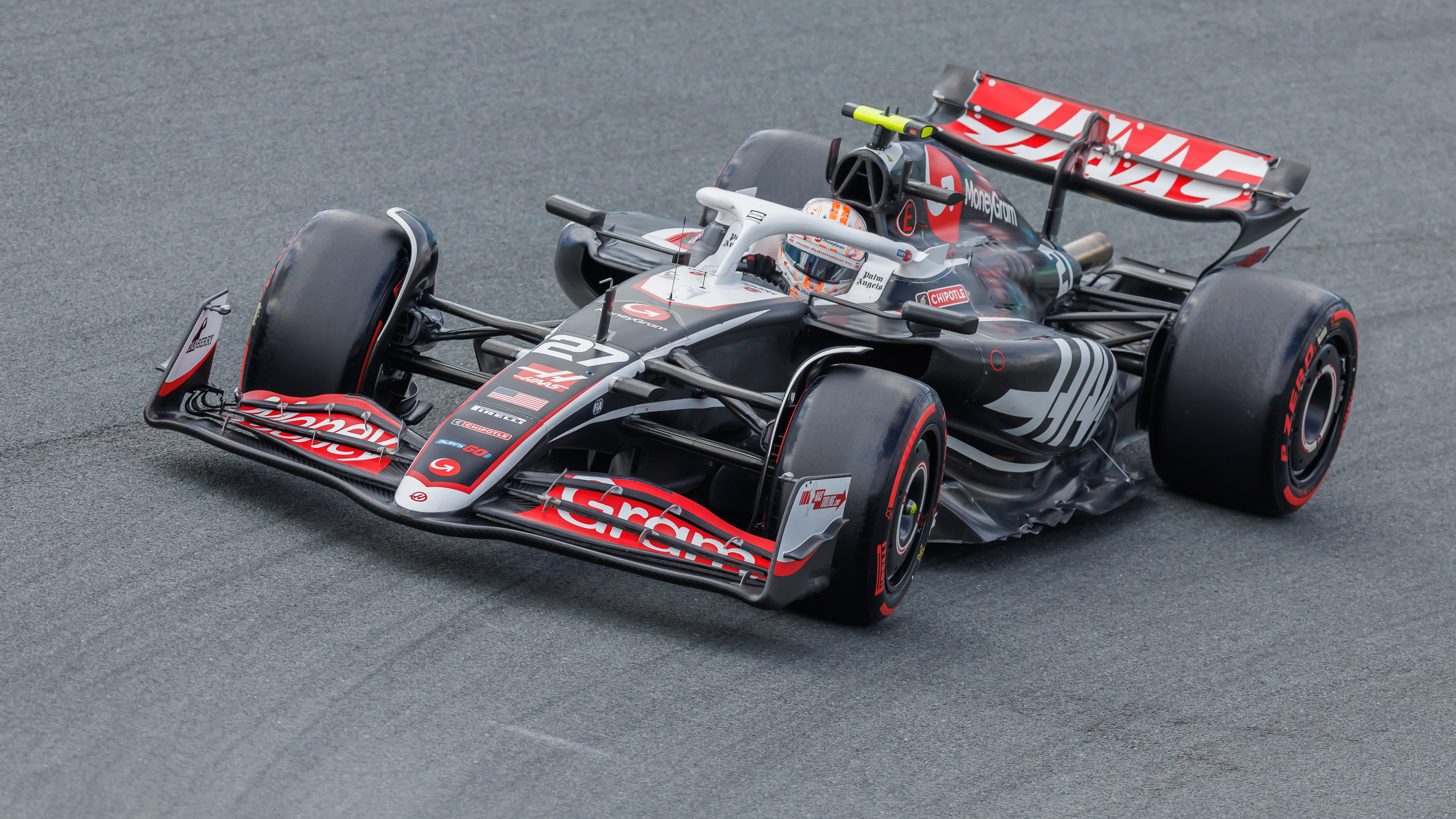
Hülkenberg driving the VF-24 at the Dutch Grand Prix

The VF-24 was introduced at the Bahrain Grand Prix. It scored its first points with Hülkenberg at the Saudi Arabian Grand Prix, followed by a double-points finish at the following Australian Grand Prix. The team's highest finish was sixth place, both times with Hülkenberg, at the Austrian and British Grands Prix.

== Complete Formula One results ==
Key

Key
Colour	Result
Gold	Winner
Silver	Second place
Bronze	Third place
Green	Other points position
Blue	Other classified position
Blue	Not classified, finished (NC)
Purple	Not classified, retired (Ret)
Red	Did not qualify (DNQ)
Black	Disqualified (DSQ)
White	Did not start (DNS)
White	Race cancelled (C)
Blank	Did not practice (DNP)
Blank	Excluded (EX)
Blank	Did not arrive (DNA)
Blank	Withdrawn (WD)
Blank	Did not enter (empty cell)
Annotation	Meaning
P	Pole position
F	Fastest lap
Superscript number	Points-scoring position in sprint

Year	Entrant	Power unit	Tyres	Driver name	Grands Prix																								Points	WCC pos.
Year	Entrant	Power unit	Tyres	Driver name	BHR	SAU	AUS	JPN	CHN	MIA	EMI	MON	CAN	ESP	AUT	GBR	HUN	BEL	NED	ITA	AZE	SIN	USA	MXC	SAP	LVG	QAT	ABU	Points	WCC pos.
2024	MoneyGram Haas F1 Team	Ferrari 066/10	P	(Denmark) Kevin Magnussen	12	12	10	13	16	19	12	Ret	12	17	8	12	15	14	18	10		19†	11^{7}	7	WD	12	9	16^{F}	58	7th
2024	MoneyGram Haas F1 Team	Ferrari 066/10	P	(Germany) Nico Hülkenberg	16	10	9	11	10	11^{7}	11	Ret	11	11	6	6	13	18	11	17	11	9	8^{8}	9	DSQ	8	Ret^{7}	8	58	7th
2024	MoneyGram Haas F1 Team	Ferrari 066/10	P	(United Kingdom) Oliver Bearman																	10				12				58	7th
