= Haas VF-20 =

Haas F1 Team's 2020 Formula One racing car

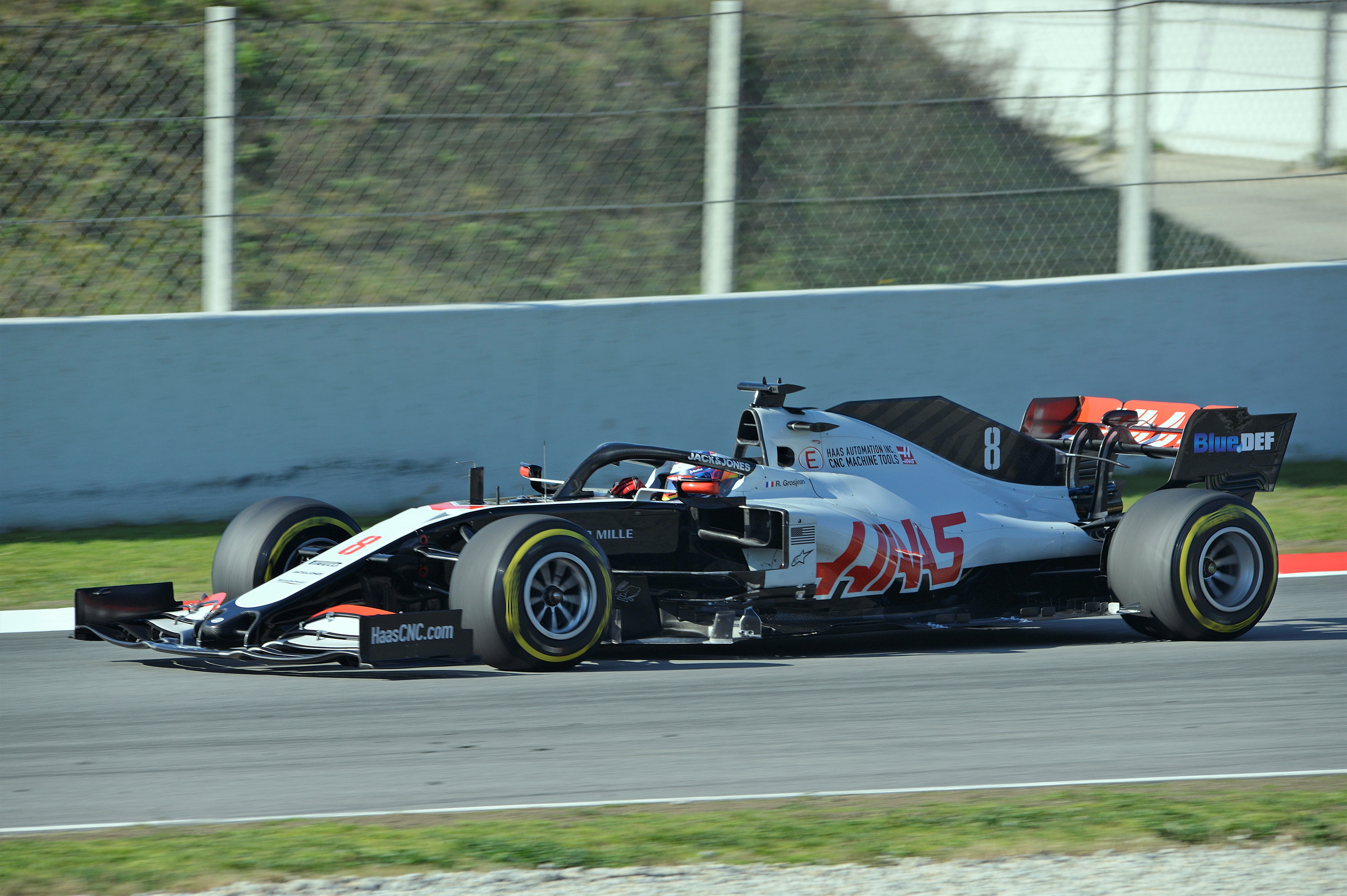
- A VF-20 driven by Romain Grosjean during the 2020 Formula One pre-season testing
- Category: Formula One
- Constructor: Haas F1 Team
- Designers: Rob Taylor (Chief Designer); Fabio Segalini (Deputy Chief Designer); Ben Agathangelou (Chief Aerodynamicist); Stephen Mahon (Deputy Head of Aerodynamics); Davide Paganelli (Head of Aerodynamic Operations)
- Predecessor: Haas VF-19
- Successor: Haas VF-21

Technical specifications
- Tyres: Pirelli

Competition history
- Notable entrants: Haas F1 Team
- Notable drivers: 8. (France) Romain Grosjean; 20. (Denmark) Kevin Magnussen; 51. (Brazil) Pietro Fittipaldi
- Debut: 2020 Austrian Grand Prix
- Last event: 2020 Abu Dhabi Grand Prix
Races	Wins	Podiums	Poles	F/Laps
17	0	0	0	0

The Haas VF-20 is a Formula One racing car designed and constructed by Haas to compete during the 2020 Formula One World Championship. The car was driven by Romain Grosjean and Kevin Magnussen, who competed for Haas for the fourth consecutive year, as well as Pietro Fittipaldi, due to Grosjean's crash in the Bahrain Grand Prix, where he replaced the Frenchman at the Sakhir and Abu Dhabi Grands Prix. The car was planned to make its competitive debut at the 2020 Australian Grand Prix, but this was delayed when the race was cancelled and the next three events in Bahrain, Vietnam and China were postponed in response to the COVID-19 pandemic. The VF-20 made its debut at the 2020 Austrian Grand Prix.

== Initial design ==
The Haas VF-20 is powered by the 2020 Ferrari power unit, paired to a 2019 Ferrari 8-speed gearbox. The design features several similarities to the Ferrari SF90 used by Ferrari in the 2019 Formula One World Championship.

== Competition history ==
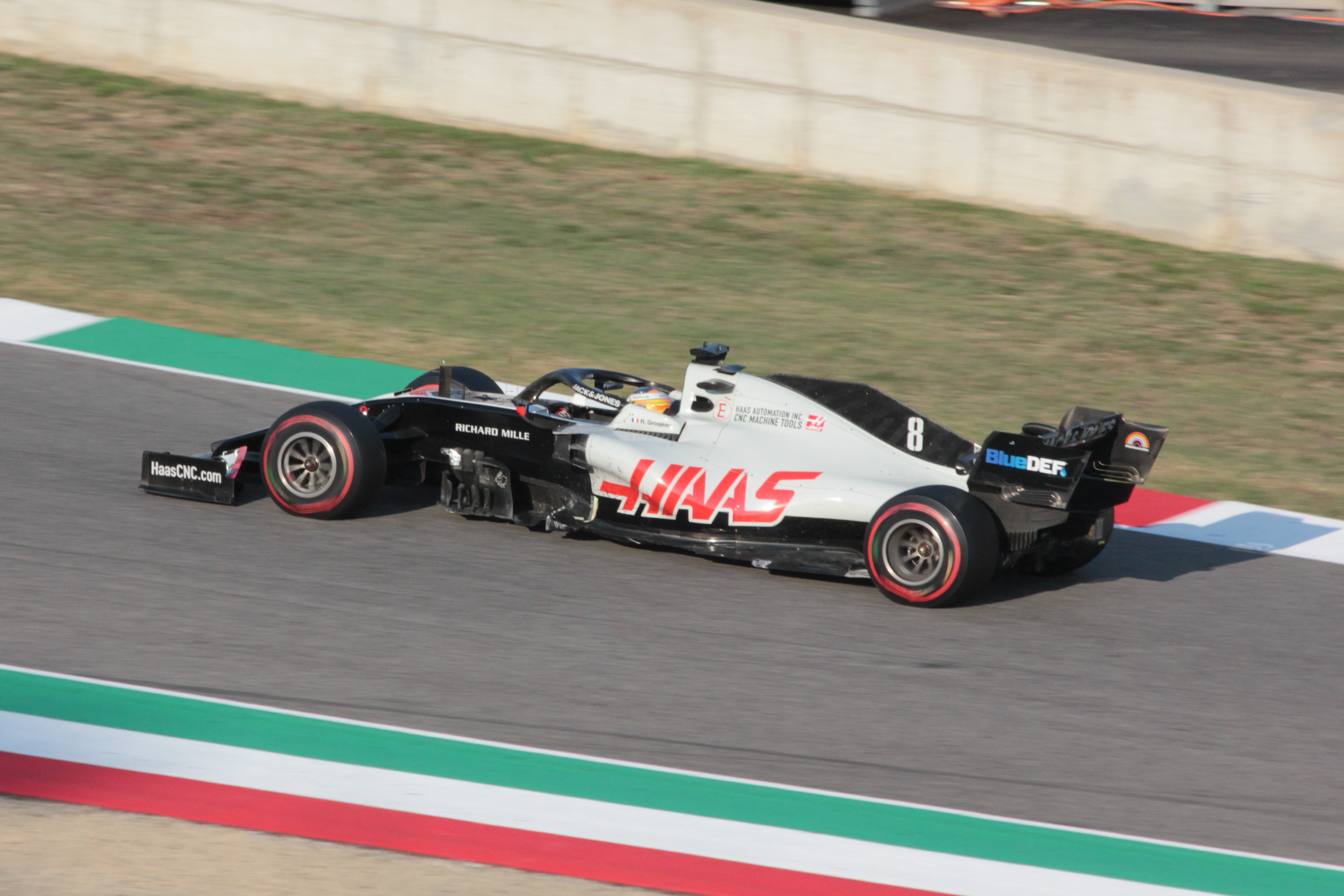
Grosjean at the Tuscan Grand Prix

The beginning of the 2020 season marked a rough start for Haas as both drivers retired with brake failure. As with the previous year's entry, the VF-19, the car struggled with consistency issues. These problems were especially apparent at the Spanish Grand Prix, with the car being two seconds slower during the race on Sunday than it was during the first practice session two days earlier. A lack of grip from the chassis, as well as a lack of power from their customer Ferrari power units, relegated Haas to the back of the grid alongside fellow Ferrari customer team, Alfa Romeo, and Williams (powered by a Mercedes engine).

== Legacy ==
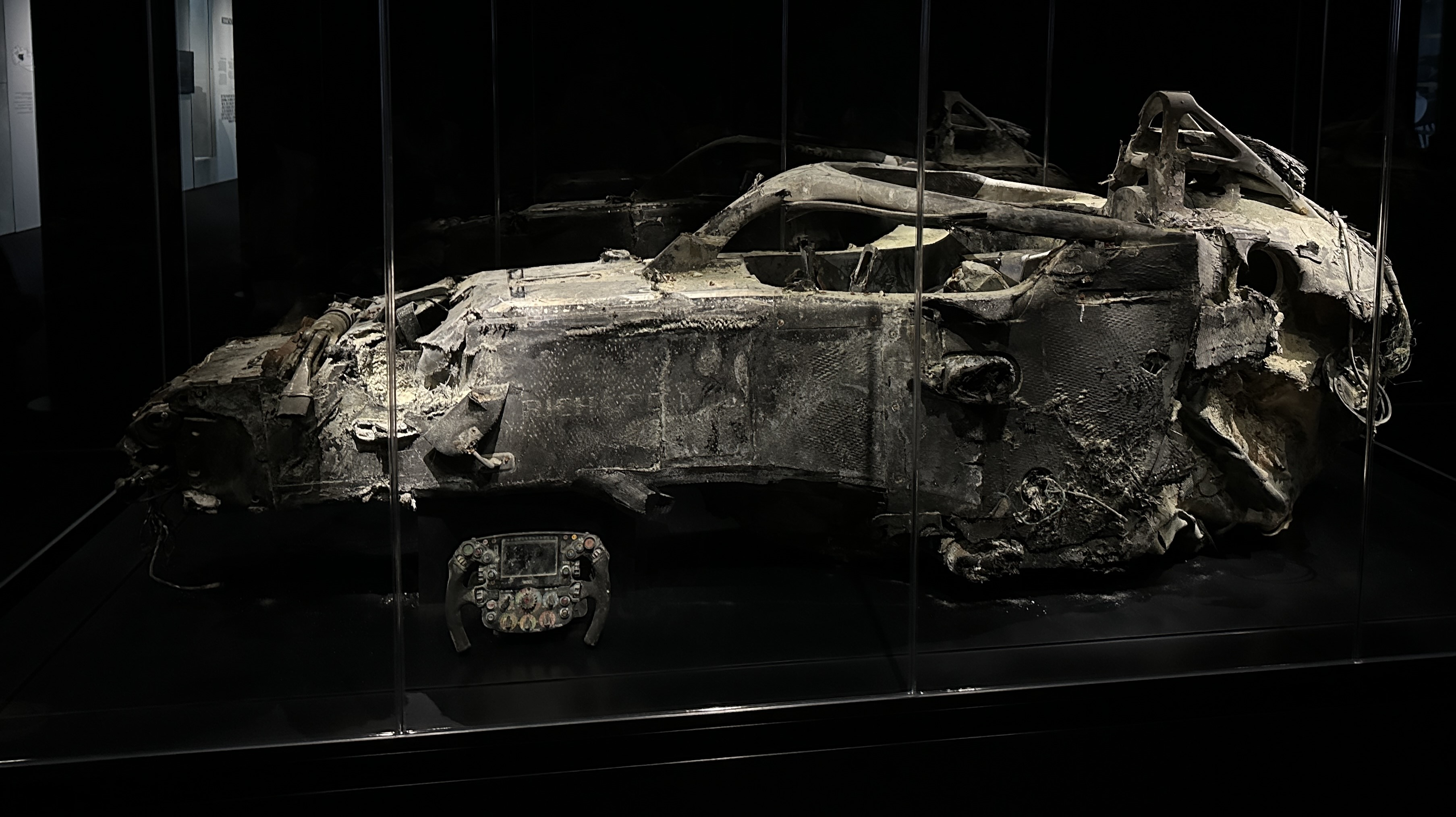
The wreckage of Grosjean's car on display, pictured in 2023

The remains of the Haas VF-20 driven by Romain Grosjean in the Bahrain Grand Prix is currently on exhibition in a new museum dedicated to Formula One in Madrid.

== Complete Formula One results ==
(key)

Year	Entrant	Power unit	Tyres	Driver name	Grands Prix																	Points	WCC
2020	Haas F1 Team	Ferrari	P		AUT	STY	HUN	GBR	70A	ESP	BEL	ITA	TUS	RUS	EIF	POR	EMI	TUR	BHR	SKH	ABU	3	9th
2020	Haas F1 Team	Ferrari	P	Romain Grosjean	Ret	13	16	16	16	19	15	12	12	17	9	17	14	Ret	Ret			3	9th
2020	Haas F1 Team	Ferrari	P	Pietro Fittipaldi																17	19	3	9th
2020	Haas F1 Team	Ferrari	P	Kevin Magnussen	Ret	12	10	Ret	Ret	15	17	Ret	Ret	12	13	16	Ret	17†	17	15	18	3	9th

Notes

- ^{†} Driver failed to finish the race, but was classified as they had completed over 90% of the winner's race distance.
