= 2021 Bahrain Grand Prix =

First round of the 2021 Formula One season

Race 1 of 22 (Note: At the time of the event Formula One planned to hold twenty-three Grands Prix.) in the 2021 Formula One World Championship
Next race →

Race details
- Date: 28 March 2021
- Official name: Formula 1 Gulf Air Bahrain Grand Prix 2021
- Location: Bahrain International Circuit; Sakhir, Bahrain
- Course: Permanent racing facility
- Course length: 5.412 km (3.363 miles)
- Distance: 56 laps, 302.826 km (188.167 miles)
- Scheduled distance: 57 laps, 308.238 km (191.530 miles)
- Weather: Clear, 21 °C (70 °F)

Pole position
Driver	(Netherlands) Max Verstappen	Red Bull Racing-Honda
- Time: 1:28.997

Fastest lap
Driver	(Finland) Valtteri Bottas	Mercedes
- Time: 1:32.090 on lap 56

Podium
First	(United Kingdom) Lewis Hamilton	Mercedes
Second	(Netherlands) Max Verstappen	Red Bull Racing-Honda
Third	(Finland) Valtteri Bottas	Mercedes

The 2021 Bahrain Grand Prix (officially known as the Formula 1 Gulf Air Bahrain Grand Prix 2021) was a Formula One race which was held on 28 March 2021 at the Bahrain International Circuit, a motor racing circuit in the west of Bahrain. It served as the season opener of the 2021 Formula One World Championship, and was the seventeenth running of the Bahrain Grand Prix.

In Saturday's qualifying, Max Verstappen, having led all three practice sessions in his Red Bull, took pole position for the fourth time in his career. In Sunday's race, Hamilton claimed victory over Verstappen, who had tried to overtake him previously but only managed to do so by exceeding track limits, and who was told to give the position back. Valtteri Bottas, Hamilton's teammate, rounded out the podium, giving their team Mercedes a large lead in the Constructors' Championship. The race was marked by controversy on the rules surrounding track limits, with leading figures from both teams criticising what they saw as unnecessarily complicated regulations. This was the first time since the 2010 Bahrain Grand Prix that Bahrain was held as a first round of a Formula One season. The race saw the debuts of 2018 Japanese F4 champion Yuki Tsunoda, 2020 Formula 2 champion Mick Schumacher and 2018 GP3 runner-up Nikita Mazepin.

== Background ==
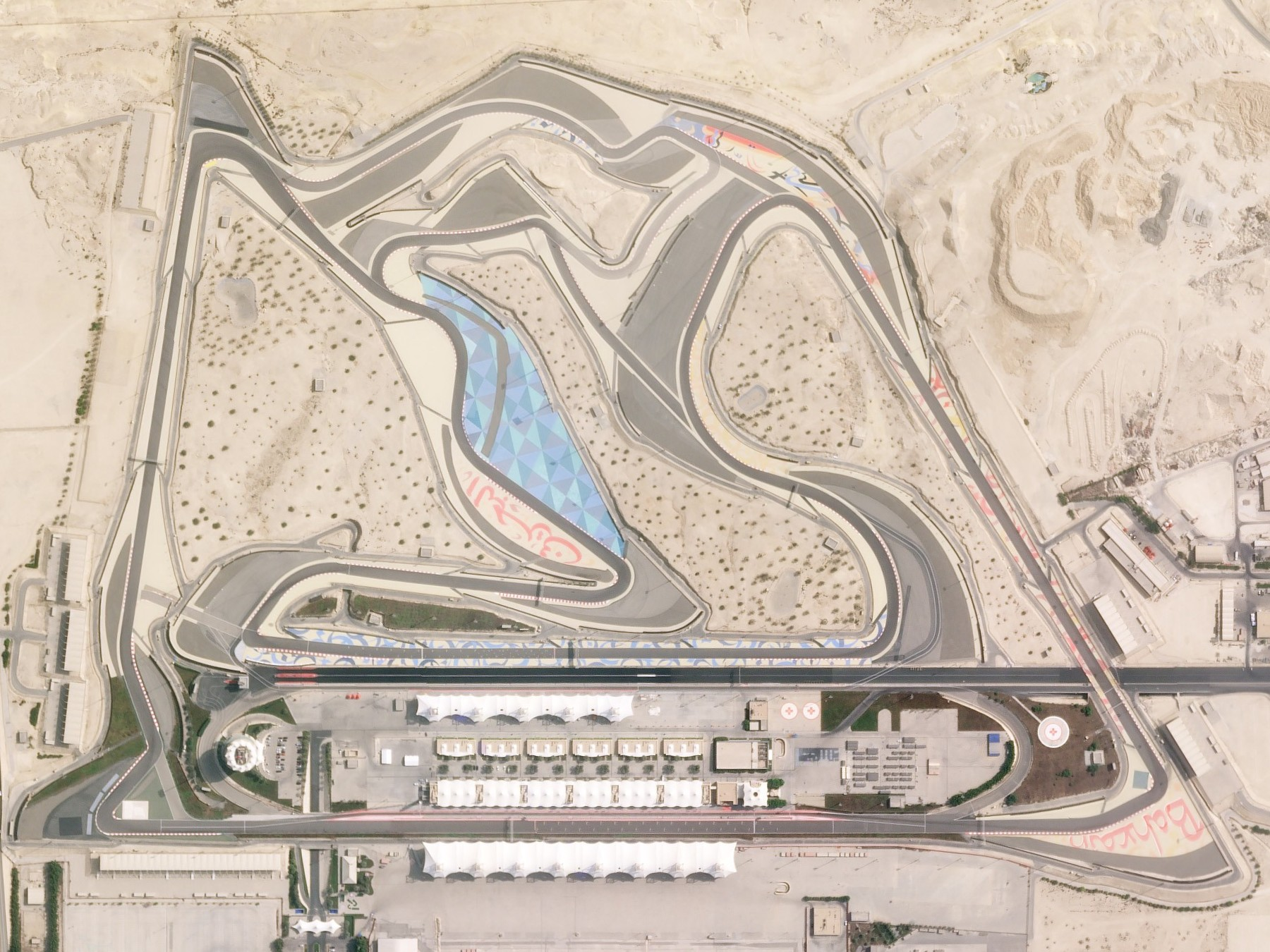
A satellite image of the Bahrain International Circuit

Pre-season testing had indicated that Red Bull Racing had closed the gap on the dominant constructor, Mercedes. The team's engine supplier, Honda, had announced that it would not be supplying engines beyond 2021, and had brought forward the lower, more compact, and more powerful engine which was previously intended for 2022. Mercedes had been adversely affected by the season's regulation changes, with their "low-rake" aerodynamic floor design, being impacted more than the "high-rake" design of their competitors.

Further back on the grid, there was excitement about the closeness of the chasing midfield pack, with the relative speeds of Ferrari, AlphaTauri, McLaren, Alpine and Aston Martin all uncertain. McLaren, Aston Martin, and Alpine (formerly Renault), third, fourth and fifth in the 2020 Constructors' Championship, had replaced outgoing drivers with proven race-winners in Daniel Ricciardo, Sebastian Vettel and Fernando Alonso respectively, but the first two had also significantly modified their aerodynamics, with McLaren changing from Renault power units to Mercedes, and Aston Martin's having issues with their "low-rake" philosophy. Alpine, meanwhile, had shown decent but not spectacular pace in testing. AlphaTauri, with a new driver in Yuki Tsunoda, looked to progress upwards from a year which included a win for Pierre Gasly at Monza, and Ferrari sought to recover from their previous season, which had been their worst in forty years.

Haas had announced before the start of the season that development on their 2021 car had already ceased, and that the team's sole focus was on the 2022 technical regulation changes. Their two rivals, Williams and Alfa Romeo Racing, last and eighth in 2020 respectively, had privately taken a similar approach by gradually stopping development of their uncompetitive cars, although no public comments were made until after the race.

=== Entries ===
The drivers and teams were the same as the season entry list with no additional stand-in drivers for the race. Three drivers made their debuts in Formula One. Yuki Tsunoda, who had finished third in the 2020 Formula 2 Championship, had impressed in pre-season testing for AlphaTauri. Two rookies debuted further down the grid for Haas: Formula 2 champion Mick Schumacher, son of seven-time world champion Michael Schumacher, made his debut alongside Russian Nikita Mazepin (competing under a neutral flag, due to his country's role in a doping scandal).

=== Tyre choices ===
Tyre supplier Pirelli brought the C2, C3 and C4 tyre compounds (designated hard, medium and soft respectively) for teams to use at the event. These were the same tyres as had been used in the previous year's event, but one step softer than those which had been used in 2019, when the C1, C2, and C3 compounds had been used. Ferrari and Alpine tested the 18-inch tyres intended for the 2022 cars in the three days after the event.

== Practice ==
The first practice session started at 14:30 local time (UTC+03:00) and the second practice session started at 18:00 local time, both on 26 March. The final practice session started at 15:00 local time on the following day. All three practice sessions lasted for one hour. This was the first race with the reduced practice lengths, with the first and second practice sessions having previously been 90 minutes in length from 2007 to 2020.

The first practice session ran without incident and ended with Max Verstappen fastest for Red Bull, ahead of the Mercedes of Valtteri Bottas and the McLaren of Lando Norris. The second practice session ended with Verstappen again fastest, ahead of Norris and Lewis Hamilton. Kimi Räikkönen hit the barriers at turn 3. The third practice session ended with Verstappen once again the fastest ahead of Hamilton and AlphaTauri driver Pierre Gasly.

Norris downplayed his strong practice form, saying he was not completely happy with his car despite being 2nd fastest in the second practice session, insisting Mercedes and Red Bull would be ahead of McLaren in qualifying and the race, a sentiment with which new teammate Daniel Ricciardo concurred. Red Bull driver Sergio Pérez was disappointed with his performance on qualifying simulations relative to his teammate Verstappen, noting he had a lot to improve in this area but was pleased with his race run performance in practice. Following Friday's sessions, Toto Wolff remarked that he expected Mercedes and Red Bull to be in a close "dogfight" with each other at the front of the field throughout the rest of the weekend.

== Qualifying ==
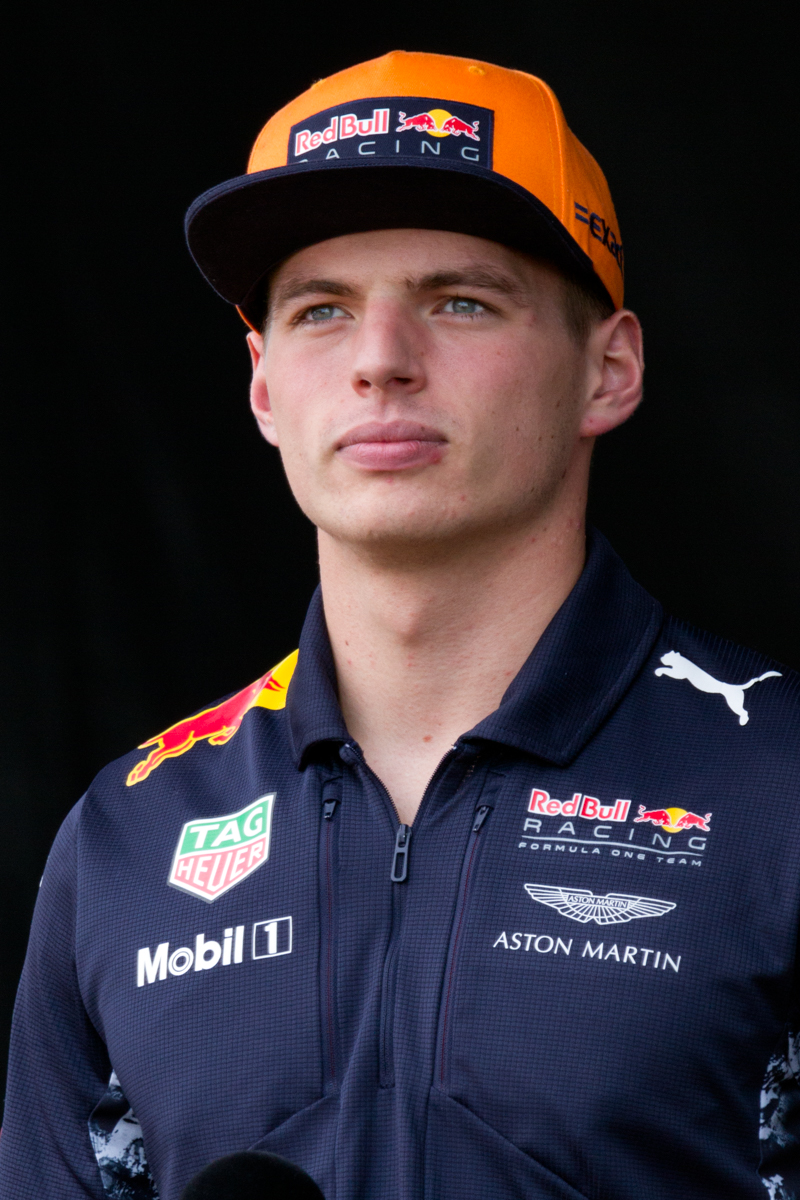
Max Verstappen (pictured in 2017) secured the fourth pole position of his career

Qualifying commenced at 18:00 local time on 27 March. A spin for the Haas of Nikita Mazepin early in the first part of qualifying (Q1) was quickly overshadowed by his actions near the end of the session. The Russian rookie angered many by not only breaking the 'unwritten gentleman's agreement' among the drivers to not overtake in the final sector of out laps, but by exacerbating the issue in spinning at the first corner, ruining the chances of others, including Esteban Ocon and Sebastian Vettel, to set a better lap time. The eliminated drivers were Ocon, Nicholas Latifi, and Vettel and the two Haas drivers, Mick Schumacher and Mazepin. Vettel would receive a five-place grid penalty for failing to slow adequately for the yellow flags after Mazepin's second spin, and would start the race from last.

Sergio Pérez, who had won his first Grand Prix at the track the previous year, albeit on the Outer Circuit, failed to progress from the second part of qualifying (Q2) on his debut for Red Bull Racing when his team unsuccessfully gambled on a medium tyres run. He ended the session in eleventh place. Similar events befell Yuki Tsunoda in his AlphaTauri, who struggled on the medium tyres having been second fastest at the end of Q1, and ended up 13th. George Russell failed to reach higher than 15th in his slow Williams. The other drivers knocked out were the two Alfa Romeos of Antonio Giovinazzi and Kimi Räikkönen, who ended the session in 12th and 14th.

The first set of lap times in the final part of qualifying (Q3) indicated that Max Verstappen's Red Bull was slightly faster than the Mercedes pair of Lewis Hamilton and Valtteri Bottas, a prediction which proved to be accurate: Verstappen claimed pole, with reigning world champion Hamilton and his teammate Bottas following. Charles Leclerc achieved a highly praised fourth place in his Ferrari, with his partner Carlos Sainz Jr. only managing eighth, four places back. The gap was filled by the AlphaTauri of Pierre Gasly and the McLaren duo of Daniel Ricciardo and Lando Norris. Fernando Alonso achieved a creditable ninth in his Alpine, after two years away from the sport, and the Aston Martin of Lance Stroll rounded out the top 10.

=== Qualifying classification ===
Pos.	No.	Driver	Constructor	Qualifying times			Final grid
Pos.	No.	Driver	Constructor	Q1	Q2	Q3	Final grid
1	33	(Netherlands) Max Verstappen	Red Bull Racing-Honda	1:30.499	1:30.318	1:28.997	1
2	44	(United Kingdom) Lewis Hamilton	Mercedes	1:30.617	1:30.085	1:29.385	2
3	77	(Finland) Valtteri Bottas	Mercedes	1:31.200	1:30.186	1:29.586	3
4	16	(Monaco) Charles Leclerc	Ferrari	1:30.691	1:30.010	1:29.678	4
5	10	(France) Pierre Gasly	AlphaTauri-Honda	1:30.848	1:30.513	1:29.809	5
6	3	(Australia) Daniel Ricciardo	McLaren-Mercedes	1:30.795	1:30.222	1:29.927	6
7	4	(United Kingdom) Lando Norris	McLaren-Mercedes	1:30.902	1:30.099	1:29.974	7
8	55	(Spain) Carlos Sainz Jr.	Ferrari	1:31.653	1:30.009	1:30.215	8
9	14	(Spain) Fernando Alonso	Alpine-Renault	1:30.863	1:30.595	1:30.249	9
10	18	(Canada) Lance Stroll	Aston Martin-Mercedes	1:31.261	1:30.624	1:30.601	10
11	11	(Mexico) Sergio Pérez	Red Bull Racing-Honda	1:31.165	1:30.659	N/A	11
12	99	(Italy) Antonio Giovinazzi	Alfa Romeo Racing-Ferrari	1:30.998	1:30.708	N/A	12
13	22	(Japan) Yuki Tsunoda	AlphaTauri-Honda	1:30.607	1:31.203	N/A	13
14	7	(Finland) Kimi Räikkönen	Alfa Romeo Racing-Ferrari	1:31.547	1:31.238	N/A	14
15	63	(United Kingdom) George Russell	Williams-Mercedes	1:31.316	1:33.430	N/A	15
16	31	(France) Esteban Ocon	Alpine-Renault	1:31.724	N/A	N/A	16
17	6	(Canada) Nicholas Latifi	Williams-Mercedes	1:31.936	N/A	N/A	17
18	5	(Germany) Sebastian Vettel	Aston Martin-Mercedes	1:32.056	N/A	N/A	20^{1}
19	47	(Germany) Mick Schumacher	Haas-Ferrari	1:32.449	N/A	N/A	18
20	9	(Russian Automobile Federation) Nikita Mazepin (Note: Nikita Mazepin is Russian, but he competed as a neutral competitor using the designation RAF (Russian Automobile Federation), as the Court of Arbitration for Sport upheld a ban on Russia competing at World Championships. The ban was implemented by the World Anti-Doping Agency in response to the state-sponsored doping program of Russian athletes.)	Haas-Ferrari	1:33.273	N/A	N/A	19
107% time: 1:36.833

==== Notes ====
- ^1 – Sebastian Vettel received a five-place grid penalty for failing to respect double yellow flags in Q1.

== Race ==
Sergio Pérez stopped on the formation lap on the way to the grid, which prompted an additional formation lap and shortened the race from 57 to 56 laps. Pérez managed to restart his Red Bull, and was instructed by his team to start the race from the pitlane, in line with the regulations. When the race got underway, Verstappen managed to stay ahead of Hamilton and hold the lead through the first corner, while Valtteri Bottas was passed by the Ferrari of Charles Leclerc; Nikita Mazepin, in his debut race, lost control of his Haas on the exit of turn 3 and spun into the barriers on the exit of the corner. The safety car was deployed until the end of lap three, and at the restart, Verstappen managed to hold off both Hamilton and Leclerc. Further back, Lando Norris, who had passed his teammate Daniel Ricciardo on the opening lap, managed to pass the AlphaTauri of Pierre Gasly and began challenging the Mercedes of Bottas for fourth place. Gasly then made contact with Ricciardo's rear and lost his front wing, necessitating a pitstop, the contact with Gasly resulted in a loss of pace for Ricciardo for the rest of the race. Mick Schumacher in the other Haas also spun, but was able to continue.

Verstappen and Red Bull were both worried about his car's reliability after his teammate's issue, so he started to build a gap to Hamilton, which reached over 1.5 seconds by the end of lap 6. Meanwhile, down the field, Norris managed to pass Leclerc for fourth place on lap 8 following a sustained battle, and numerous moves were being made in the tightly packed midfield – ten seconds separated Norris in 4th to Pérez, who had managed to make his way up to twelfth. When Alpine told Fernando Alonso to pit from eighth place for fresh tyres on lap 11, it triggered a flurry of activity in the midfield, as teams sought to not be outwitted by the undercut strategy of others. Up at the front, Hamilton pitted for hard tyres at the end of lap 14; Red Bull chose not to pit Verstappen, favouring a strategy that would see their driver on fresher tyres at the end of the race.

When Verstappen pitted, four laps after his rival, he emerged in second, seven seconds behind. By this stage, all the drivers had pitted, and Carlos Sainz Jr., Sebastian Vettel and Alonso were engaging in a three-way scrap for eighth place, described as 'brilliant wheel-to-wheel racing' by Jolyon Palmer, from which Sainz emerged triumphant on lap 23. The rookie Yuki Tsunoda soon overtook the two former World Champions in quick succession: first the Aston Martin of Vettel on lap 25; then Alonso on lap 27. Verstappen managed to close to within four seconds of Hamilton in eight laps, and when Hamilton pitted to get rid of his underperforming hard tyres on lap 28, the gap was down to two seconds. His Mercedes teammate Bottas had to endure a painfully slow stop a few laps later, when his pit crew were momentarily unable to get one tyre off, virtually removing him from contention, and dropping him down to fifth place. Alonso was forced to retire from the race, with a brake issue.

On lap 32, Verstappen was informed by his team that Hamilton was consistently exceeding track limits at turn 4, and that Verstappen could start doing the same, to which Verstappen replied: "... how is that legal, ... I thought we weren't allowed to do that". Hamilton was warned about exceeding track limits at turn 4 on lap 38; he had committed this offence 29 times, with Hamilton stating "I thought there was no track limits". When Verstappen pitted a couple of laps later, he emerged nine seconds behind Hamilton, but on much fresher tyres, with sixteen laps remaining in the race. Verstappen quickly closed the gap to his rival, going faster than anyone else in the process. Meanwhile, Sainz overtook Lance Stroll for eighth into turn 1, and Esteban Ocon was rear-ended by the Aston Martin of Vettel. Both were able to resume racing.

By the start of lap 51, Verstappen had closed to within a second of Hamilton, and launched his attack when Hamilton ran wide on the exit of turn 10. The next lap, he overtook the Mercedes around the outside of turn 4; however, since he completed the overtake by going off the track, he was instructed by the team to hand the position back, which he did between turns 10 and 11. The Red Bull was then hit by oversteer caused by the dirty air off the Mercedes on the exit of turn 13, and Verstappen lost significant time trying to bring it under control. This gave Hamilton the opportunity to pull away, and the rapidly-closing Verstappen was not able to overtake before the end of the race. Meanwhile, Bottas pitted for fresh tyres, and set the fastest lap of the race.

=== After the race ===
At the podium interview, conducted by Jenson Button, both Hamilton and Bottas emphasised the role their team had played. Hamilton emphasised Red Bull's "amazing performance all weekend", and how it took "something special" from both team and driver to win the race. Bottas was disappointed with the ten-second pitstop which effectively took him out of contention, but highlighted how Mercedes had made "steps forward" through the weekend, to close the performance gap on Verstappen and Red Bull. Toto Wolff, Mercedes team principal, praised the whole team, but also felt that luck had played some part in the victory: "at the end, the racing gods were on our side".

Verstappen himself remained positive, reflecting on how Red Bull were "really taking the fight to them [Mercedes]". Verstappen's teammate Pérez mourned what could have been if the car hadn't stopped on the formation lap, but emphasised the potential of the year ahead. Red Bull team principal Christian Horner praised the performance by both his drivers and by the team, noting that being "frustrated by second place [is] not a bad place to be".

Leading figures from both of the top teams expressed confusion over the regulations on track limits, especially those at turn 4. It was later reported that the confusion had stemmed from a pre-race instruction that turn limits at turn 4 would only be enforced in cases where 'a lasting advantage' was gained in the race. The stewards interpreted this as meaning that only overtaking off-track was not allowed; however, post-race analysis proved that Hamilton had gained almost three seconds at turn 4, with running wide worth at least 0.1 seconds per lap. Horner criticised the inconsistency of changing track limits between qualifying and the race, saying that this type of situation "shouldn't be shaded grey". Hamilton noted that the situation "was very confusing", asking "[where] is the boundary when you are overtaking?". Wolff compared the regulations at the event to "a Shakespeare novel", and called for consistency on the instructions from the FIA. Race director Michael Masi, however, insisted that the rules had been clear, saying "nothing changed at all during the race".

Further down the paddock, Alpine revealed that Fernando Alonso's retirement was caused by a sandwich wrapper getting lodged in one of his brake ducts. Yuki Tsunoda's performance was highly praised, with Ross Brawn calling him the "best rookie F1 has had for years". Tsunoda was critical of his own performance, stating he was only "half satisfied". Sebastian Vettel felt that he could not have avoided a collision with Esteban Ocon, but he did apologise for the incident. Ocon was pleased with his race pace and strategy, but was disappointed with his final result, attributing it to bad luck in qualifying and the collision with Vettel; he believed he could have finished in the lower half of the points had his qualifying attempt been "normal".

=== Race classification ===
Pos.	No.	Driver	Constructor	Laps	Time/Retired	Grid	Points
1	44	(United Kingdom) Lewis Hamilton	Mercedes	56	1:32:03.897	2	25
2	33	(Netherlands) Max Verstappen	Red Bull Racing-Honda	56	+0.745	1	18
3	77	(Finland) Valtteri Bottas	Mercedes	56	+37.383	3	16^{1}
4	4	(United Kingdom) Lando Norris	McLaren-Mercedes	56	+46.466	7	12
5	11	(Mexico) Sergio Pérez	Red Bull Racing-Honda	56	+52.047	PL^{2}	10
6	16	(Monaco) Charles Leclerc	Ferrari	56	+59.090	4	8
7	3	(Australia) Daniel Ricciardo	McLaren-Mercedes	56	+1:06.004	6	6
8	55	(Spain) Carlos Sainz Jr.	Ferrari	56	+1:07.100	8	4
9	22	(Japan) Yuki Tsunoda	AlphaTauri-Honda	56	+1:25.692	13	2
10	18	(Canada) Lance Stroll	Aston Martin-Mercedes	56	+1:26.713	10	1
11	7	(Finland) Kimi Räikkönen	Alfa Romeo Racing-Ferrari	56	+1:28.864	14	
12	99	(Italy) Antonio Giovinazzi	Alfa Romeo Racing-Ferrari	55	+1 lap	12	
13	31	(France) Esteban Ocon	Alpine-Renault	55	+1 lap	16	
14	63	(United Kingdom) George Russell	Williams-Mercedes	55	+1 lap	15	
15	5	(Germany) Sebastian Vettel	Aston Martin-Mercedes	55	+1 lap^{3}	20	
16	47	(Germany) Mick Schumacher	Haas-Ferrari	55	+1 lap	18	
17^{4}	10	(France) Pierre Gasly	AlphaTauri-Honda	52	Suspension	5	
18^{4}	6	(Canada) Nicholas Latifi	Williams-Mercedes	51	Fuel system	17	
Ret	14	(Spain) Fernando Alonso	Alpine-Renault	32	Brakes	9	
Ret	9	(Russian Automobile Federation) Nikita Mazepin	Haas-Ferrari	0	Accident	19	
Fastest lap: (Finland) Valtteri Bottas (Mercedes) – 1:32.090 (lap 56)

==== Notes ====
- ^1 – Includes one point for fastest lap.
- ^2 – Sergio Pérez qualified 11th, but he started the race from the pit lane due to an electrical issue that occurred during the formation lap. His place on the grid was left vacant.
- ^3 – Sebastian Vettel received a 10-second time penalty for causing a collision with Esteban Ocon.
- ^4 – Pierre Gasly and Nicholas Latifi were classified as they completed more than 90% of the race distance.

== Championship standings after the race ==
Drivers' Championship standings

Pos.	Driver	Points
1	(United Kingdom) Lewis Hamilton	25
2	(Netherlands) Max Verstappen	18
3	(Finland) Valtteri Bottas	16
4	(United Kingdom) Lando Norris	12
5	(Mexico) Sergio Pérez	10

Constructors' Championship standings

Pos.	Constructor	Points
1	(Germany) Mercedes	41
2	(Austria) Red Bull Racing-Honda	28
3	(United Kingdom) McLaren-Mercedes	18
4	(Italy) Ferrari	12
5	(Italy) AlphaTauri-Honda	2

- Note: Only the top five positions are included for both sets of standings.

== See also ==
- 2021 Sakhir Formula 2 round

== Notes ==
Previous race: 2020 Abu Dhabi Grand Prix	FIA Formula One World Championship; 2021 season	Next race: 2021 Emilia Romagna Grand Prix
Previous race: 2020 Bahrain Grand Prix	Bahrain Grand Prix	Next race: 2022 Bahrain Grand Prix
