= 2022 Bahrain Grand Prix =

First round of the 2022 Formula One season

Race 1 of 22 (Note: There were originally twenty-three Grands Prix scheduled to feature on the 2022 calendar, however following the Russian invasion of Ukraine in February, the Russian Grand Prix was cancelled. At the time of the Bahrain Grand Prix, Formula One planned to replace the cancelled race; however, this ultimately did not take place and only twenty-two races were held.) in the 2022 Formula One World Championship
Next race →

Race details
- Date: 20 March 2022
- Official name: Formula 1 Gulf Air Bahrain Grand Prix 2022
- Location: Bahrain International Circuit; Sakhir, Bahrain
- Course: Permanent racing facility
- Course length: 5.412 km (3.363 miles)
- Distance: 57 laps, 308.238 km (191.530 miles)
- Weather: Clear
- Attendance: 98,000

Pole position
Driver	(Monaco) Charles Leclerc	Ferrari
- Time: 1:30.558

Fastest lap
Driver	(Monaco) Charles Leclerc	Ferrari
- Time: 1:34.570 on lap 51

Podium
First	(Monaco) Charles Leclerc	Ferrari
Second	(Spain) Carlos Sainz Jr.	Ferrari
Third	(United Kingdom) Lewis Hamilton	Mercedes

The 2022 Bahrain Grand Prix (officially known as the Formula 1 Gulf Air Bahrain Grand Prix 2022) was a Formula One race that was held on 20 March 2022 at the Bahrain International Circuit. Contested over 57 laps, it served as the season opener of the 2022 Formula One World Championship and was the eighteenth running of the Bahrain Grand Prix.

Ferrari driver Charles Leclerc won the race after starting from pole position, his first win since the 2019 Italian Grand Prix. He led all but two laps and scored a hat-trick with pole, race win, and fastest lap, falling just short of a grand slam. (Note: As a team, Ferrari achieved the grand slam as Charles Leclerc's teammate Carlos Sainz Jr. was the only other driver to lead a lap. It was Ferrari's first team grand slam since the 2010 Singapore Grand Prix.) His teammate Carlos Sainz Jr. finished in second with Lewis Hamilton in third, as reigning champion Max Verstappen and Sergio Pérez both retired from podium positions with fuel problems late in the race. It was Ferrari's first win and 1–2 finish since the 2019 Singapore Grand Prix. The race also saw the debut of Zhou Guanyu, who became the first Chinese driver to race in Formula One and the first to score points.

== Background ==
The event, officially known as the Formula 1 Gulf Air Bahrain Grand Prix 2022, took place from 18–20 March 2022 at the Bahrain International Circuit in Sakhir, Bahrain. The track had hosted all seventeen previous Bahrain Grands Prix as well as the Sakhir Grand Prix, a one-off race held in a different track configuration in 2020. The 2022 weekend marked the fourth time the race served as the Formula One season opener, after 2006, 2010, and 2021.

In recent years, Mercedes had dominated at the track, winning six of the previous eight Bahrain Grands Prix, including five with Lewis Hamilton; going into the weekend, Hamilton and Mercedes were on a streak of three consecutive victories at the event.

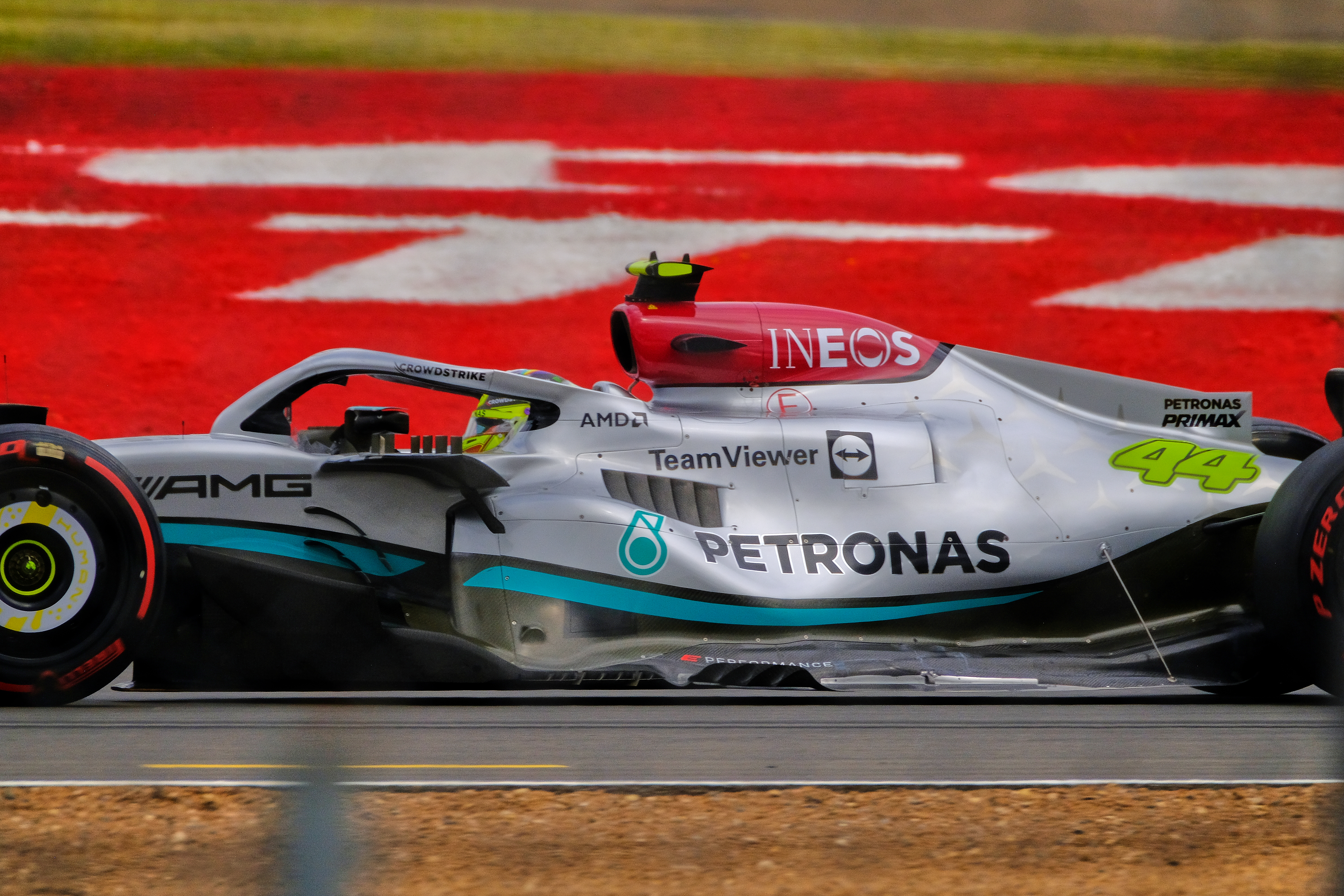
Lewis Hamilton driving the Mercedes W13 at the 2022 British Grand Prix. The minimalist sidepod design is visible to the right of his helmet.

At the previous Formula One race, the 2021 Abu Dhabi Grand Prix, Red Bull driver Max Verstappen won his first Drivers' Championship, following a season-long battle with Lewis Hamilton. A controversial safety car restart enabled Verstappen to overtake Hamilton on the last lap, winning the race to become champion and denying Hamilton a record-breaking eighth F1 title. Following the controversy, Formula One race director Michael Masi was removed from his position and replaced by Eduardo Freitas and Niels Wittich, who alternated in the role. Mercedes won a record-extending eighth Constructors' Championship, securing the title at the final race of the season as well. The 2021 season was the first since 2008 in which the champion driver did not drive for the champion constructors.

Major technical changes planned to be introduced in 2021 were implemented for the 2022 season, after the effects of the COVID-19 pandemic forced their postponement. Ground effects were reintroduced with the aim of making following and overtaking other cars easier, and the sliding scale used to calculate a team's aerodynamic testing allocation was modified to boost lower-placed teams. The team budget cap was also reduced from US$145 million to $142.4 million.

The race weekend was preceded by a pre-season test that also took place at the Bahrain International Circuit, from 10–12 March. Ferrari and Red Bull were regarded as the quickest constructors, with Red Bull team principal Christian Horner describing the Ferrari F1-75 as being the "most settled" car on track, and both Mercedes drivers naming them as the fastest teams. During the test, Mercedes revealed a minimalist sidepod design on their cars which differed significantly from the rest of the grid. Both of the team's drivers expressed skepticism about the car, with Hamilton revealing his struggle to "tame" it. The reintroduction of ground effects meant that many constructors encountered porpoising during pre-season testing, which was resolved to differing levels of success—Ferrari and Red Bull were able to fix their problems in advance of the race weekend, while Mercedes would continue to struggle with the issue for the opening rounds of the season.

Multiple teams changed their driver lineups for the 2022 season, with drivers debuting for their new teams at the event. Alfa Romeo signed Valtteri Bottas to replace Kimi Räikkönen, who retired from Formula One. George Russell replaced Bottas at Mercedes and vacated his seat at Williams, which was filled by Red Bull reserve driver Alex Albon. Zhou Guanyu was signed by Alfa Romeo, after a third-place finish in the 2021 Formula 2 Championship. He was the only rookie to join the grid in 2022. Nikita Mazepin was contracted to drive for Haas, but was replaced by Kevin Magnussen after his sponsor's contract was terminated following the Russian invasion of Ukraine. Magnussen had previously competed with Haas from 2017 to 2020.

Aston Martin's Sebastian Vettel tested positive for coronavirus before the race weekend and was replaced by reserve driver Nico Hülkenberg. This was Hülkenberg's first race since his one-off appearance at the 2020 Eifel Grand Prix. Vettel returned for the Australian Grand Prix.

As part of the 2022 regulation changes, wheel diameters increased from 13 inches to 18 inches; as a result, tyre supplier Pirelli brought the C1, C2, and C3 tyre compounds (designated hard, medium, and soft, respectively) for teams to use at the event—a step harder than 2021, where the C2, C3 and C4 tyres were used. Additionally, drivers who made it to the third round of qualifying were no longer required to start the race on the tyres they used in the second round, eliminating a rule which had been in place since 2014.

== Free practice ==
Three hour-long practice sessions were held at the Grand Prix, with two on Friday and one on Saturday before qualifying. The first session started at 15:00 local time (UTC+03:00), and was red flagged when Esteban Ocon's Alpine shed its sidepod bodywork on the main straight. After a restart, the session ended with Pierre Gasly of AlphaTauri fastest, on soft tyres.

Max Verstappen topped the second and third sessions, with Charles Leclerc narrowly behind in both outings. Reigning Constructors' Champions Mercedes struggled for pace throughout the free practices and placed no higher than fourth on the timesheets, with Lewis Hamilton describing the team as being "a long way off" from the front of the grid. Yuki Tsunoda did not set a time in the third session, being forced to return to the garage with a hydraulic leak before he could complete a lap.

== Qualifying ==
Qualifying started at 18:00 local time on 19 March and lasted for one hour. Both Aston Martins were eliminated in Q1, along with Yuki Tsunoda, Daniel Ricciardo, and Nicholas Latifi. The session also saw Valtteri Bottas unexpectedly place his Alfa Romeo in fourth position, with Kevin Magnussen of Haas one place behind him. Fellow Haas driver Mick Schumacher placed 13th, which gave the team their first Q2 appearance with both cars since the 2019 Brazilian Grand Prix. In his first qualifying outing for Williams, Alex Albon sent his Williams 15th fastest, completing a lap time almost a second faster than that of his teammate, Latifi.

In Q2, Verstappen was quickest, closely followed by the two Ferraris. Sergio Pérez was behind them, ahead of the Mercedes drivers in fifth and sixth. Before he was forced back to the garage with a hydraulic issue, Magnussen managed to place seventh, securing his team's first Q3 appearance in over two years, while a late lap from Valtteri Bottas knocked Esteban Ocon out of Q3 by 0.065 seconds. McLaren and Williams both failed to make Q3, with Lando Norris and Alex Albon being eliminated at the end of the Q2 session.

Charles Leclerc of Ferrari won pole position, ahead of Verstappen and teammate Carlos Sainz Jr. Pérez qualified fourth, three-tenths of a second behind Sainz. Mercedes managed fifth and ninth place, with their two cars split by Bottas, Magnussen, and Fernando Alonso. AlphaTauri's Pierre Gasly completed the top ten.

=== Qualifying classification ===
Pos.	No.	Driver	Constructor	Qualifying times			Final grid
Pos.	No.	Driver	Constructor	Q1	Q2	Q3	Final grid
1	16	(Monaco) Charles Leclerc	Ferrari	1:31.471	1:30.932	1:30.558	1
2	1	(Netherlands) Max Verstappen	Red Bull Racing-RBPT	1:31.785	1:30.757	1:30.681	2
3	55	(Spain) Carlos Sainz Jr.	Ferrari	1:31.567	1:30.787	1:30.687	3
4	11	(Mexico) Sergio Pérez	Red Bull Racing-RBPT	1:32.311	1:31.008	1:30.921	4
5	44	(United Kingdom) Lewis Hamilton	Mercedes	1:32.285	1:31.048	1:31.238	5
6	77	(Finland) Valtteri Bottas	Alfa Romeo-Ferrari	1:31.919	1:31.717	1:31.560	6
7	20	(Denmark) Kevin Magnussen	Haas-Ferrari	1:31.955	1:31.461	1:31.808	7
8	14	(Spain) Fernando Alonso	Alpine-Renault	1:32.346	1:31.621	1:32.195	8
9	63	(United Kingdom) George Russell	Mercedes	1:32.269	1:31.252	1:32.216	9
10	10	(France) Pierre Gasly	AlphaTauri-RBPT	1:32.096	1:31.635	1:32.338	10
11	31	(France) Esteban Ocon	Alpine-Renault	1:32.041	1:31.782	N/A	11
12	47	(Germany) Mick Schumacher	Haas-Ferrari	1:32.380	1:31.998	N/A	12
13	4	(United Kingdom) Lando Norris	McLaren-Mercedes	1:32.239	1:32.008	N/A	13
14	23	(Thailand) Alexander Albon	Williams-Mercedes	1:32.726	1:32.664	N/A	14
15	24	(China) Zhou Guanyu	Alfa Romeo-Ferrari	1:32.493	1:33.543	N/A	15
16	22	(Japan) Yuki Tsunoda	AlphaTauri-RBPT	1:32.750	N/A	N/A	16
17	27	(Germany) Nico Hülkenberg	Aston Martin Aramco-Mercedes	1:32.777	N/A	N/A	17
18	3	(Australia) Daniel Ricciardo	McLaren-Mercedes	1:32.945	N/A	N/A	18
19	18	(Canada) Lance Stroll	Aston Martin Aramco-Mercedes	1:33.032	N/A	N/A	19
20	6	(Canada) Nicholas Latifi	Williams-Mercedes	1:33.634	N/A	N/A	20
107% time: 1:37.873

== Race ==
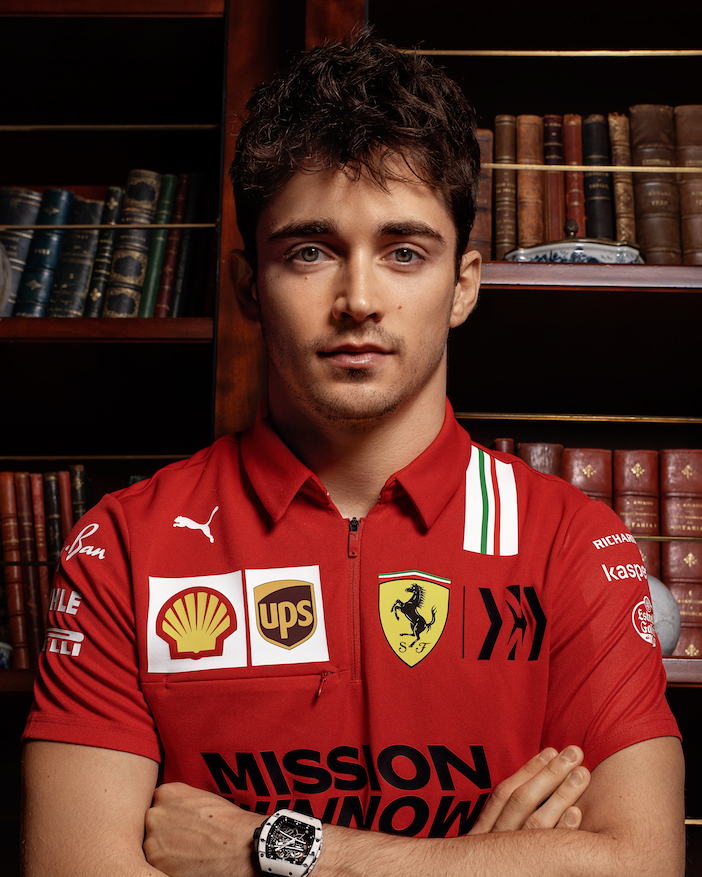
Charles Leclerc (pictured in 2020) won the third race of his career, after starting from pole position.

The race started at 18:00 local time on 20 March and lasted for 57 laps. Leclerc led through turn 1, ahead of Verstappen and Sainz, while Pérez was passed by Hamilton and Magnussen. Bottas, who started sixth, fell to 14th within the first lap. Ocon collided with and spun Schumacher on the first lap, earning a five-second penalty. By lap 10, Pérez had passed Magnussen and Hamilton to regain fourth position.

Hamilton entered the pit lane on lap 12, the first driver of the race to do so, and re-entered the race 12th. Verstappen pitted on lap 15 in an attempt to undercut Leclerc, with Sainz following him into the pit lane. Leclerc pitted a lap later, emerging narrowly ahead of Verstappen and retaining his lead. Verstappen passed Leclerc on lap 17 using DRS, but Leclerc regained the lead soon after. On lap 19, Verstappen attempted to pass again, but locked up and overshot turn 1, allowing Leclerc to build a lead.

On lap 31, Verstappen pitted a second time, again followed by Leclerc a lap later, with both cars switching to medium tyres. Sainz, now leading, pitted alongside Pérez on lap 34, which left Leclerc and Verstappen in first and second position, respectively. Verstappen entered the pit lane for a third time on lap 44, prompting Sainz and Hamilton to do the same; all three emerged on soft tyres. On lap 46, Gasly's car caught fire, which caused the safety car to be deployed. Leclerc pitted for soft tyres during the safety car window, returning to the field in the lead.

When the race restarted on lap 51, Leclerc maintained his lead over Verstappen, who radioed the pit crew to notify them he suspected he had a power unit issue. Verstappen, now moving slowly, was passed by Sainz and Hamilton, and he entered the pit lane to retire his car on lap 54. On the final lap, Pérez suffered a fuel system issue which caused his power unit to switch off, spinning his car and forcing him to retire. Leclerc and Sainz maintained first and second position, followed by Hamilton in third, through to the end of the race. Russell finished fourth with Magnussen in fifth.

=== Post-race ===
The race result ended Ferrari's 45-race winless streak dating back to the 2019 Singapore Grand Prix—the second longest streak in Ferrari's history. Team principal Mattia Binotto described the outcome as "fantastic" and "a relief", noting the unity within the team and the motivational impact the win would have. He also emphasised the need for restraint, expressing his belief that Mercedes "will come back very strong". Leclerc hailed his victory and 1–2 finish as a return to winning form for Ferrari after two "incredibly difficult" years, praising the team's adaptation to the new 2022 regulations and his personal growth as a driver. Sainz praised the team's development, but expressed his frustration at his own lack of pace, claiming he had "some homework to do over these few days."

By winning the first race of the season, Leclerc and Ferrari took the leads of the Drivers' and Constructors' Championships, respectively. This marked the first time a Ferrari driver had led the Drivers' Championship since 2019, and the first time Ferrari had led the Constructors' Championship since 2018. This occasion also marked the first time in Leclerc's career in which he claimed the lead in the Drivers' Championship. Both would lead their respective championships until the 2022 Spanish Grand Prix, where Max Verstappen and Red Bull replaced them as championship leaders, and held the leads for the rest of the season to win both titles.

Red Bull's team principal Christian Horner labeled his team's double DNF as "brutal" and the team's "worst nightmare", although he was optimistic about the competitiveness of the car. Verstappen was also critical, saying that "at this level, after already having so much information with engines and stuff, it shouldn't happen". Pérez was similarly disappointed, calling the result a "very disappointing day, a very disappointing start", but spoke of his confidence in the team to resolve the issue.

Hamilton found Mercedes' performance "remarkable" after previously expressing reservation about the car's capabilities, although he conceded that the team struggled in the race. Toto Wolff, Mercedes' team principal, was doubtbul about defending the team's Constructors' title, calling it "a very long shot to even think about being in contention for any of the championships".

On his debut, Zhou Guanyu became the first Chinese driver to compete in Formula One, and having finished tenth, the first Chinese driver to score points.

=== Race classification ===
Pos.	No.	Driver	Constructor	Laps	Time/Retired	Grid	Points
1	16	(Monaco) Charles Leclerc	Ferrari	57	1:37:33.584	1	26^{a}
2	55	(Spain) Carlos Sainz Jr.	Ferrari	57	+5.598	3	18
3	44	(United Kingdom) Lewis Hamilton	Mercedes	57	+9.675	5	15
4	63	(United Kingdom) George Russell	Mercedes	57	+11.211	9	12
5	20	(Denmark) Kevin Magnussen	Haas-Ferrari	57	+14.754	7	10
6	77	(Finland) Valtteri Bottas	Alfa Romeo-Ferrari	57	+16.119	6	8
7	31	(France) Esteban Ocon	Alpine-Renault	57	+19.423	11	6
8	22	(Japan) Yuki Tsunoda	AlphaTauri-RBPT	57	+20.386	16	4
9	14	(Spain) Fernando Alonso	Alpine-Renault	57	+22.390	8	2
10	24	(China) Zhou Guanyu	Alfa Romeo-Ferrari	57	+23.064	15	1
11	47	(Germany) Mick Schumacher	Haas-Ferrari	57	+32.574	12	
12	18	(Canada) Lance Stroll	Aston Martin Aramco-Mercedes	57	+45.873	19	
13	23	(Thailand) Alexander Albon	Williams-Mercedes	57	+53.932	14	
14	3	(Australia) Daniel Ricciardo	McLaren-Mercedes	57	+54.975	18	
15	4	(United Kingdom) Lando Norris	McLaren-Mercedes	57	+56.335	13	
16	6	(Canada) Nicholas Latifi	Williams-Mercedes	57	+1:01.795	20	
17	27	(Germany) Nico Hülkenberg	Aston Martin Aramco-Mercedes	57	+1:03.829	17	
18^{b}	11	(Mexico) Sergio Pérez	Red Bull Racing-RBPT	56	Fuel system	4	
19^{b}	1	(Netherlands) Max Verstappen	Red Bull Racing-RBPT	54	Fuel system	2	
Ret	10	(France) Pierre Gasly	AlphaTauri-RBPT	44	Power unit	10	
Fastest lap: (Monaco) Charles Leclerc (Ferrari) – 1:34.570 (lap 51)

Notes

- ^a – Includes one point for fastest lap.
- ^b – Sergio Pérez and Max Verstappen were classified as they completed more than 90% of the race distance.

== Championship standings after the race ==
Drivers' Championship standings

Pos.	Driver	Points
1	(Monaco) Charles Leclerc	26
2	(Spain) Carlos Sainz Jr.	18
3	(United Kingdom) Lewis Hamilton	15
4	(United Kingdom) George Russell	12
5	(Denmark) Kevin Magnussen	10

Constructors' Championship standings

Pos.	Constructor	Points
1	(Italy) Ferrari	44
2	(Germany) Mercedes	27
3	(United States) Haas-Ferrari	10
4	(Switzerland) Alfa Romeo-Ferrari	9
5	(France) Alpine-Renault	8

- Note: Only the top five positions are included for both sets of standings.

== See also ==
- 2022 Sakhir Formula 2 round
- 2022 Sakhir Formula 3 round

== Notes ==
Previous race: 2021 Abu Dhabi Grand Prix	FIA Formula One World Championship; 2022 season	Next race: 2022 Saudi Arabian Grand Prix
Previous race: 2021 Bahrain Grand Prix	Bahrain Grand Prix	Next race: 2023 Bahrain Grand Prix
