= Arron Melvin =

American aerodynamicist

- Citizenship: American
- Education: Princeton University
- Years active: 2007–2023
- Employer: Haas F1 Team
- Known for: Formula One aerodynamicist

Arron Melvin is an American Formula One and motorsport aerodynamicist. He is best known for serving as the Head of Aerodynamics at the Haas F1 Team between 2021 and 2023.

== Career ==
Melvin studied Mechanical and Aerospace Engineering at Princeton University, completing both his undergraduate degree and PhD before entering professional motorsport. He joined the Honda Racing F1 Team in 2007 as an aerodynamicist, contributing to wind-tunnel development and aerodynamic design during the team's Brackley era. He was promoted to Senior Aerodynamicist in 2008. Melvin remained with the team following Honda's withdrawal from Formula One at the end of that season, when the operation was restructured as Brawn GP. As a senior member of the aerodynamics group, he contributed to the design and development of the Brawn BGP001, the car that secured both the Drivers’ and Constructors’ Championships in 2009. He continued in a senior aerodynamic role when the team transitioned into Mercedes-Benz Grand Prix in 2010.

In 2012, Melvin returned to the United States to join Pratt Miller Engineering as Technical Director – Aerodynamics. There he established and led a new aerodynamics department, delivering projects across multiple categories including IndyCar, the IMSA SportsCar Championship, GT racing, NASCAR, and road-car programmes. His work included aerodynamic leadership on Chevrolet’s IndyCar aero kits and Corvette racing programmes, contributing to championship successes and major endurance-race victories.

Melvin returned to Formula One in 2016 with the American Haas F1 Team as Principal Aerodynamicist, playing a key role in establishing the team's aerodynamic development structure during its formative seasons. He was promoted to Head of Aerodynamics in 2021, overseeing the expansion of Haas's aerodynamics department and directing concept development, CFD, and wind-tunnel operations. He departed at the end of 2023 and has since worked as an aerodynamic consultant based in Portland, Oregon.
