= Damien Brayshaw =

New Zealand engineer

- Born: Damien Leigh Brayshaw
- Citizenship: New Zealand

Academic background
- Education: Cranfield University
- Thesis: Use of numerical optimisation to determine on-limit handling behaviour of race cars (2004)
- Doctoral advisor: Matthew Harrison
- Occupation: Engineer
- Known for: Formula One engineer
- Title: Performance director
- Engineering career
- Employer: Haas F1 Team

Damien Leigh Brayshaw is a New Zealand Formula One engineer. He is currently the performance director at the Haas F1 Team.

== Career ==
Brayshaw studied environmental engineering at Massey University, graduating with a Bachelor of Technology degree with first-class honours in 1998. He then completed a PhD in motorsport engineering at Cranfield University in the United Kingdom. He began his professional career as a research engineer with Fonterra before moving into the automotive sector with Xtrac, where he worked as a design analyst on transmission systems.

In 2006, Brayshaw joined Red Bull Racing as a vehicle dynamics engineer, later becoming a senior simulation engineer and subsequently team leader for simulation and modelling. In this role he contributed to the development of Red Bull's simulation-led performance tools during the period that laid the foundations for the team's championship-winning era. Brayshaw moved to Scuderia Ferrari in 2013, initially as an aerodynamics performance engineer before becoming a race performance engineer. He later served as race engineering factory-side technical leader, acting as a key interface between Maranello-based engineering groups and trackside operations.

Brayshaw joined the Haas F1 Team in 2019 as principal vehicle performance engineer. He was promoted to head of vehicle performance in 2020, overseeing simulation, vehicle dynamics, and performance analysis activities, before being appointed performance director in 2024, taking overall responsibility for the team's performance engineering organisation.
