= Andrea De Zordo =

Italian engineer

- Born: 1 May 1974 (age 51); Faenza, Italy
- Citizenship: Italian
- Occupation: Engineer
- Employer: Haas F1 Team
- Known for: Formula One engineer
- Title: Technical Director

Andrea De Zordo (born 1 May 1974) is an Italian Formula One engineer. He is currently the technical director at the Haas Formula One team.

== Career ==
Born in Faenza, Italy - the same town renowned for its longstanding association with Italian motorsport - De Zordo developed an early passion for racing and engineering. He studied mechanical engineering at the University of Bologna, and got his first job in motorsport as a stress engineer for the Minardi team.

De Zordo then joined McLaren for a five-year stint, before moving back to Italy as a senior design engineer at Scuderia Ferrari. After spells as Head of Mechanical Design and Deputy Chief Designer, De Zordo was seconded to the Haas F1 Team as Chief Designer. This move, driven by cost cap regulations, involved the transfer of Ferrari employees to Haas, where they worked from a design office located next to Ferrari's facility.

After three years, De Zordo was promoted to Technical director in March 2024 - leading the Technical team in Maranello for the American outfit.
