= Matteo Piraccini =

Italian engineer

- Citizenship: (Italy) Italian
- Occupation: Engineer
- Employer: Racing Bulls
- Title: Operations director

Matteo Piraccini is an Italian Formula One engineer. He is the Operations director at the Racing Bulls Formula One team.

== Career ==
Piraccini graduated from the University of Bologna with a degree in mechanical engineering before completing a PhD focused on the numerical and experimental analysis of hydraulic systems. He joined the Minardi Formula One team as a research and development engineer, working on drivetrain and vehicle systems while also supporting factory and trackside testing programmes.

Following the transformation of Minardi into Scuderia Toro Rosso in 2006, Piraccini became Gearbox and Systems Chief Engineer, overseeing gearbox assembly, hydraulic systems, and the team’s expanding R&D and test activities. He later combined this role with responsibilities as Quality Manager, introducing improved inspection, traceability, and supplier-integration processes across composite production and race operations. In 2014 he was appointed Chief Designer, Mechanical and Systems, leading the design of drivetrain, suspension, cooling, braking, and fuel systems under Technical Director James Key.

Piraccini joined the FIA in 2015 as a Senior Research Engineer, contributing to projects within the Global Institute for Motor Sport Safety analysing crash mechanisms and cockpit safety development.

He returned to Formula One with Haas F1 Team in 2019, first as Head of Mechanical Design and then Head of Chassis Engineering, helping establish a new design structure and supporting development of the 2022-generation cars. In 2024 he returned back to Faenza, at the team now called Racing Bulls, as operations director. He oversees technical coordination and operational delivery.
