= Davide Paganelli =

Italian aerodynamicist

- Citizenship: Italian
- Education: University of Bologna
- Occupation: Aerodynamicist
- Employer: Haas F1 Team
- Known for: Formula One aerodynamicist
- Title: Head of Aerodynamics

Davide Paganelli is an Italian Formula One aerodynamicist. He is currently the Head of Aerodynamics at the Haas F1 Team.

== Career ==
Paganelli studied mechanical engineering at the University of Bologna, before completing further studies in aerospace engineering at the University of Forlì. His thesis focused on high-speed liquid-jet atomisation and the development of hybrid modelling techniques. Paganelli began his professional career in 2004 as a mechanical designer at the tobacco-machinery manufacturer G.D. He moved into motorsport the following year, joining Fondmetal Technologies as an aerodynamicist. In this role he contributed to wind-tunnel testing, CFD development, and aerodynamic model design for a number of racing programmes, including work supporting Renault F1, Force India, Team Lotus and NASCAR teams, as well as involvement in wind-tunnel commissioning and testing activities in Italy.

In 2012 he joined Scuderia Ferrari as an aerodynamicist, working on the development of Formula One car aerodynamics at Maranello. In 2014 he was seconded to the newly established Haas F1 Team, which was making use of Ferrari aerodynamic personnel and facilities during its formation. He later progressed to become Head of Aerodynamic Operations, overseeing the design and manufacture of wind-tunnel model components and coordinating development activities between Ferrari and Haas.

Paganelli became Head of Aerodynamics at Haas in September 2023, assuming responsibility for the overall aerodynamic direction of the car, including concept development, CFD and wind-tunnel operations, and performance integration with the wider chassis and vehicle-performance groups.
