= 2018 Russian Grand Prix =

Race 16 of 21 in the 2018 Formula One World Championship
← Previous race	Next race →
- Layout of the Sochi Autodrom

Race details
- Date: 30 September 2018
- Official name: Formula 1 2018 VTB Russian Grand Prix
- Location: Sochi Autodrom, Adlersky City District, Sochi, Krasnodar Krai, Russia
- Course: Permanent racing facility
- Course length: 5.848 km (3.634 miles)
- Distance: 53 laps, 309.745 km (192.467 miles)
- Weather: Cloudy

Pole position
Driver	(Finland) Valtteri Bottas	Mercedes
- Time: 1:31.387

Fastest lap
Driver	(Finland) Valtteri Bottas	Mercedes
- Time: 1:35.861 on lap 50

Podium
First	(United Kingdom) Lewis Hamilton	Mercedes
Second	(Finland) Valtteri Bottas	Mercedes
Third	(Germany) Sebastian Vettel	Ferrari

The 2018 Russian Grand Prix (officially the Formula 1 2018 VTB Russian Grand Prix) was a Formula One motor race held on 30 September 2018 at the Sochi Autodrom in Sochi, Russia. The race was the 16th round of the 2018 Formula One World Championship and marked the 7th running of the Russian Grand Prix and the 5th time the race had been held in Sochi.

Mercedes driver Lewis Hamilton entered the round with a 40-point lead over Sebastian Vettel in the Drivers' Championship. In the World Constructors' Championship, Mercedes led Ferrari by 37 points. The race was one of controversy, as Mercedes enacted team orders to swap their two drivers, handing Lewis Hamilton the win and Valtteri Bottas would move to 2nd place for the race finish. The race result sparked discussion regarding the future of team orders in the sport, and some even going as to call for an outright ban on the practice.

== Report ==
=== Background ===
The race was moved from its April date to September to fill the vacancy of the Malaysian Grand Prix, which was discontinued at the end of the 2017 Formula One World Championship. During the weekend, the first DRS zone was extended by 100 meters so that the beginning of the DRS zone started 95 meters before turn 1.

=== Practice ===
Artem Markelov replaced Carlos Sainz Jr. at Renault during the first practice session.

=== Qualifying ===
During the first qualifying session, Brendon Hartley, driver for Toro Rosso, was eliminated after complaining about vibrations on his car. Williams' driver, Sergey Sirotkin, spun near the end of the session, leaving him in P18.

In Q2, several teams elected not to place times, hoping that this would give them an advantage on race day. Red Bull and Toro Rosso's Pierre Gasly opted to remain in the garage due to grid penalties that required them to start at the back of the grid. Renault also chose to miss the session to allow them a free tyre choice in the race.

During his hot lap, Hamilton overcommitted into Turn 7, resulting in his car heading off into the run-off area. This allowed for Bottas to take pole position, securing the sixth pole of his career.

=== Race ===
At the start, Sebastian Vettel got a better start than Lewis Hamilton but there was no room to overtake heading into turn one. On lap 4, both Scuderia Toro Rosso drivers Pierre Gasly and Brendon Hartley suffered brake failures which forced both to retire; they were the only retirements of the race. Later on lap 14, Hamilton made his one and only pitstop of the race, putting him behind Vettel. Two laps later, Hamilton made a move on Vettel at turn 3 and passed him into fourth place into turn 4.

The most notable moment of the race came on lap 26, when Mercedes asked Valtteri Bottas to let Hamilton through into second at turn 13, gifting the Briton the race win. Max Verstappen, who led the race since lap 19, came in for his pitstop on lap 42. Hamilton won the race for the third time in his career, with Bottas second and Vettel completing the podium in third place. As a consequence, Hamilton extended his lead over Vettel in the championship to 50 points.

== Classification ==
=== Qualifying ===
Pos.	No.	Driver	Constructor	Qualifying times			Final grid
Pos.	No.	Driver	Constructor	Q1	Q2	Q3	Final grid
1	77	(Finland) Valtteri Bottas	Mercedes	1:32.964	1:32.744	1:31.387	1
2	44	(United Kingdom) Lewis Hamilton	Mercedes	1:32.410	1:32.595	1:31.532	2
3	5	(Germany) Sebastian Vettel	Ferrari	1:33.476	1:33.045	1:31.943	3
4	7	(Finland) Kimi Räikkönen	Ferrari	1:33.341	1:33.065	1:32.237	4
5	20	(Denmark) Kevin Magnussen	Haas-Ferrari	1:34.078	1:33.747	1:33.181	5
6	31	(France) Esteban Ocon	Racing Point Force India-Mercedes	1:34.290	1:33.596	1:33.413	6
7	16	(Monaco) Charles Leclerc	Sauber-Ferrari	1:33.924	1:33.488	1:33.419	7
8	11	(Mexico) Sergio Pérez	Racing Point Force India-Mercedes	1:34.084	1:33.923	1:33.563	8
9	8	(France) Romain Grosjean	Haas-Ferrari	1:34.022	1:33.517	1:33.704	9
10	9	(Sweden) Marcus Ericsson	Sauber-Ferrari	1:34.170	1:33.995	1:35.196	10
11	33	(Netherlands) Max Verstappen	Red Bull Racing-TAG Heuer	1:33.048	No time		19^{1}
12	3	(Australia) Daniel Ricciardo	Red Bull Racing-TAG Heuer	1:33.247	No time		18^{2}
13	10	(France) Pierre Gasly	Scuderia Toro Rosso-Honda	1:34.383	No time		17^{3}
14	55	(Spain) Carlos Sainz Jr.	Renault	1:34.626	No time		11
15	27	(Germany) Nico Hülkenberg	Renault	1:34.655	No time		12
16	28	(New Zealand) Brendon Hartley	Scuderia Toro Rosso-Honda	1:35.037			20^{4}
17	14	(Spain) Fernando Alonso	McLaren-Renault	1:35.504			16^{5}
18	35	(Russia) Sergey Sirotkin	Williams-Mercedes	1:35.612			13
19	2	(Belgium) Stoffel Vandoorne	McLaren-Renault	1:35.977			15^{6}
20	18	(Canada) Lance Stroll	Williams-Mercedes	1:36.437			14
107% time: 1:38.878

Notes

- ^1 – Max Verstappen received a 43-place grid penalty: 35 places for exceeding his quota of power unit elements, 5 places for an unscheduled gearbox change and 3 places for a yellow flag infringement in qualifying.
- ^2 – Daniel Ricciardo received a 40-place grid penalty: 35 places for exceeding his quota of power unit elements and 5 places for an unscheduled gearbox change.
- ^3 – Pierre Gasly received a 35-place grid penalty for exceeding his quota of power unit elements.
- ^4 – Brendon Hartley received a 40-place grid penalty for exceeding his quota of power unit elements.
- ^5 – Fernando Alonso received a 30-place grid penalty for exceeding his quota of power unit elements.
- ^6 – Stoffel Vandoorne received a 5-place grid penalty for an unscheduled gearbox change.

Despite receiving no penalties, both of the Renault drivers elected not to run any laps on Q2 due to them automatically receiving places 11 and 12. They were then able to start the race on fresh tyres of their choice.

=== Race ===
Pos.	No.	Driver	Constructor	Laps	Time/Retired	Grid	Points
1	44	(United Kingdom) Lewis Hamilton	Mercedes	53	1:27:25.181	2	25
2	77	(Finland) Valtteri Bottas	Mercedes	53	+2.545	1	18
3	5	(Germany) Sebastian Vettel	Ferrari	53	+7.487	3	15
4	7	(Finland) Kimi Räikkönen	Ferrari	53	+16.543	4	12
5	33	(Netherlands) Max Verstappen	Red Bull Racing-TAG Heuer	53	+31.016	19	10
6	3	(Australia) Daniel Ricciardo	Red Bull Racing-TAG Heuer	53	+1:20.451	18	8
7	16	(Monaco) Charles Leclerc	Sauber-Ferrari	53	+1:38.390	7	6
8	20	(Denmark) Kevin Magnussen	Haas-Ferrari	52	+1 lap	5	4
9	31	(France) Esteban Ocon	Racing Point Force India-Mercedes	52	+1 lap	6	2
10	11	(Mexico) Sergio Pérez	Racing Point Force India-Mercedes	52	+1 lap	8	1
11	8	(France) Romain Grosjean	Haas-Ferrari	52	+1 lap	9	
12	27	(Germany) Nico Hülkenberg	Renault	52	+1 lap	12	
13	9	(Sweden) Marcus Ericsson	Sauber-Ferrari	52	+1 lap	10	
14	14	(Spain) Fernando Alonso	McLaren-Renault	52	+1 lap	16	
15	18	(Canada) Lance Stroll	Williams-Mercedes	52	+1 lap	14	
16	2	(Belgium) Stoffel Vandoorne	McLaren-Renault	51	+2 laps	15	
17	55	(Spain) Carlos Sainz Jr.	Renault	51	+2 laps	11	
18	35	(Russia) Sergey Sirotkin	Williams-Mercedes	51	+2 laps	13	
Ret	10	(France) Pierre Gasly	Scuderia Toro Rosso-Honda	4	Brakes	17	
Ret	28	(New Zealand) Brendon Hartley	Scuderia Toro Rosso-Honda	4	Brakes	20	

== Championship standings after the race ==
Drivers' Championship standings

	Pos.	Driver	Points
	1	(United Kingdom) Lewis Hamilton*	306
	2	(Germany) Sebastian Vettel*	256
1	3	(Finland) Valtteri Bottas*	189
1	4	(Finland) Kimi Räikkönen*	186
	5	(Netherlands) Max Verstappen	158

Constructors' Championship standings

Pos.	Constructor	Points
1	(Germany) Mercedes*	495
2	(Italy) Ferrari*	442
3	(Austria) Red Bull Racing-TAG Heuer*	292
4	(France) Renault	91
5	(United States) Haas-Ferrari	80

- Note: Only the top five positions are included for both sets of standings.
- Bold text and an asterisk indicates competitors who still had a theoretical chance of becoming World Champion.

== See also ==
- 2018 Sochi Formula 2 round
- 2018 Sochi GP3 Series round

Previous race: 2018 Singapore Grand Prix	FIA Formula One World Championship; 2018 season	Next race: 2018 Japanese Grand Prix
Previous race: 2017 Russian Grand Prix	Russian Grand Prix	Next race: 2019 Russian Grand Prix
