= 2017 Bahrain Grand Prix =

Race 3 of 20 in the 2017 Formula One World Championship
← Previous race	Next race →

Race details
- Date: 16 April 2017
- Official name: 2017 Formula 1 Gulf Air Bahrain Grand Prix
- Location: Bahrain International Circuit; Sakhir, Bahrain
- Course: Permanent racing facility
- Course length: 5.412 km (3.362 miles)
- Distance: 57 laps, 308.238 km (191.530 miles)
- Weather: Clear
- Attendance: 93,000 (weekend) 33,000 (Race Day)

Pole position
Driver	(Finland) Valtteri Bottas	Mercedes
- Time: 1:28.769

Fastest lap
Driver	(United Kingdom) Lewis Hamilton	Mercedes
- Time: 1:32.798 on lap 46

Podium
First	(Germany) Sebastian Vettel	Ferrari
Second	(United Kingdom) Lewis Hamilton	Mercedes
Third	(Finland) Valtteri Bottas	Mercedes

The 2017 Bahrain Grand Prix (formally known as the 2017 Formula 1 Gulf Air Bahrain Grand Prix) was a Formula One motor race that took place on 16 April 2017 at the Bahrain International Circuit in Sakhir, Bahrain. The race was the third round of the 2017 FIA Formula One World Championship and marked the thirteenth time that the Bahrain Grand Prix has been run as a round of the Formula One World Championship. The winner of the previous Bahrain Grand Prix, Nico Rosberg, did not compete as he had retired after the 2016 season. Sebastian Vettel entered the race as the championship leader, equal on points with Lewis Hamilton but recognised as leader on a count-back. Mercedes led the Constructors' Championship by one point over Ferrari.

== Background ==
=== Driver changes ===
After missing the opening two rounds of the season due to injury, Pascal Wehrlein returned to competition with Sauber. Antonio Giovinazzi, who replaced Wehrlein in the Australian and Chinese Grands Prix, resumed testing and reserve driver duties for Ferrari.

== Qualifying ==
During the first qualifying session, Carlos Sainz, driving for Toro Rosso, experienced power loss to his car, leaving him in 16th position. Several other drivers were affected by flags waved for Sainz's stoppage, resulting in early exits from the session.

During Q2, McLaren driver, Fernando Alonso, was left in 15th position after a broken power unit prevented him from setting a time. Front-end problems stopped Williams driver, Lance Stroll, from leaving the garage until late in the session, where he was eventually pushed down into 12th position.

During the final qualifying session, Hamilton broke his previous pole time while attempting to receive his 55th pole position. However, Valtteri Bottas managed to improve on his teammate's time, winning his maiden pole position by two-hundredths of a second.

=== Qualifying classification ===
Pos.	Car no.	Driver	Constructor	Qualifying times			Final grid
Pos.	Car no.	Driver	Constructor	Q1	Q2	Q3	Final grid
1	77	(Finland) Valtteri Bottas	Mercedes	1:31.041	1:29.555	1:28.769	1
2	44	(United Kingdom) Lewis Hamilton	Mercedes	1:30.814	1:29.535	1:28.792	2
3	5	(Germany) Sebastian Vettel	Ferrari	1:31.037	1:29.596	1:29.247	3
4	3	(Australia) Daniel Ricciardo	Red Bull Racing-TAG Heuer	1:31.667	1:30.497	1:29.545	4
5	7	(Finland) Kimi Räikkönen	Ferrari	1:30.988	1:29.843	1:29.567	5
6	33	(Netherlands) Max Verstappen	Red Bull Racing-TAG Heuer	1:30.904	1:30.307	1:29.687	6
7	27	(Germany) Nico Hülkenberg	Renault	1:31.057	1:30.169	1:29.842	7
8	19	(Brazil) Felipe Massa	Williams-Mercedes	1:31.373	1:30.677	1:30.074	8
9	8	(France) Romain Grosjean	Haas-Ferrari	1:31.691	1:30.857	1:30.763	9
10	30	(United Kingdom) Jolyon Palmer	Renault	1:31.458	1:30.899	1:31.074	10
11	26	(Russia) Daniil Kvyat	Toro Rosso	1:31.531	1:30.923		11
12	18	(Canada) Lance Stroll	Williams-Mercedes	1:31.748	1:31.168		12
13	94	(Germany) Pascal Wehrlein	Sauber-Ferrari	1:31.995	1:31.414		13
14	31	(France) Esteban Ocon	Force India-Mercedes	1:31.774	1:31.684		14
15	14	(Spain) Fernando Alonso	McLaren-Honda	1:32.054	No time		15
16	55	(Spain) Carlos Sainz Jr.	Toro Rosso	1:32.118			16
17	2	(Belgium) Stoffel Vandoorne	McLaren-Honda	1:32.313			17
18	11	(Mexico) Sergio Pérez	Force India-Mercedes	1:32.318			18
19	9	(Sweden) Marcus Ericsson	Sauber-Ferrari	1:32.543			19
20	20	(Denmark) Kevin Magnussen	Haas-Ferrari	1:32.900			20
107% time: 1:37.170

== Race ==
At the start, Bottas led away with Vettel in hot pursuit after he beat Hamilton into 2nd off the line, Vettel pitted early as did Verstappen, however Verstappen had a brake failure soon after and had to retire from the race. A collision between Stroll and Sainz occurred and with Stroll's car stuck on the track the safety car was deployed to clear it away. Hamilton then pitted but was penalised 5 seconds for holding up Ricciardo into the pits, he served his penalty at his second stop costing him a chance of winning the race. Alonso's frustration boiled over in a radio message saying he has never had so little power in his life before later retiring with engine problems. Vettel won from Hamilton who was let through into 2nd by Bottas with 10 laps to go.

=== Race classification ===
Pos.	No.	Driver	Constructor	Laps	Time/Retired	Grid	Points
1	5	(Germany) Sebastian Vettel	Ferrari	57	1:33:53.374	3	25
2	44	(United Kingdom) Lewis Hamilton	Mercedes	57	+6.660	2	18
3	77	(Finland) Valtteri Bottas	Mercedes	57	+20.397	1	15
4	7	(Finland) Kimi Räikkönen	Ferrari	57	+22.475	5	12
5	3	(Australia) Daniel Ricciardo	Red Bull Racing-TAG Heuer	57	+39.346	4	10
6	19	(Brazil) Felipe Massa	Williams-Mercedes	57	+54.326	8	8
7	11	(Mexico) Sergio Pérez	Force India-Mercedes	57	+1:02.606	18	6
8	8	(France) Romain Grosjean	Haas-Ferrari	57	+1:14.865	9	4
9	27	(Germany) Nico Hülkenberg	Renault	57	+1:20.188	7	2
10	31	(France) Esteban Ocon	Force India-Mercedes	57	+1:35.711	14	1
11	94	(Germany) Pascal Wehrlein	Sauber-Ferrari	56	+1 Lap	13	
12	26	(Russia) Daniil Kvyat	Toro Rosso	56	+1 Lap	11	
13	30	(United Kingdom) Jolyon Palmer	Renault	56	+1 Lap	10	
14^{1}	14	(Spain) Fernando Alonso	McLaren-Honda	54	Power unit	15	
Ret	9	(Sweden) Marcus Ericsson	Sauber-Ferrari	50	Gearbox	19	
Ret	55	(Spain) Carlos Sainz Jr.	Toro Rosso	12	Collision	16	
Ret	18	(Canada) Lance Stroll	Williams-Mercedes	12	Collision	12	
Ret	33	(Netherlands) Max Verstappen	Red Bull Racing-TAG Heuer	11	Brakes	6	
Ret	20	(Denmark) Kevin Magnussen	Haas-Ferrari	8	Electrical	20	
DNS	2	(Belgium) Stoffel Vandoorne	McLaren-Honda	0	Water pressure	—^{2}	

Notes

- ^1 – Fernando Alonso retired from the race, but was classified as he had completed 90% of the race distance.
- ^2 – Stoffel Vandoorne did not line up on the grid as a result of a power unit issue.

== Championship standings after the race ==
Drivers' Championship standings

	Pos.	Driver	Points
	1	(Germany) Sebastian Vettel	68
	2	(United Kingdom) Lewis Hamilton	61
1	3	(Finland) Valtteri Bottas	38
1	4	(Finland) Kimi Räikkönen	34
2	5	(Netherlands) Max Verstappen	25

Constructors' Championship standings

	Pos.	Constructor	Points
1	1	(Italy) Ferrari	102
1	2	(Germany) Mercedes	99
	3	(Austria) Red Bull Racing-TAG Heuer	47
1	4	Force India-Mercedes	17
1	5	(United Kingdom) Williams-Mercedes	16

- Note: Only the top five positions are included for both sets of standings.

== See also ==
- 2017 Sakhir Formula 2 round

Previous race: 2017 Chinese Grand Prix	FIA Formula One World Championship; 2017 season	Next race: 2017 Russian Grand Prix
Previous race: 2016 Bahrain Grand Prix	Bahrain Grand Prix	Next race: 2018 Bahrain Grand Prix
