= 2019 Russian Grand Prix =

2019 Formula One race

Race 16 of 21 in the 2019 Formula One World Championship
← Previous race	Next race →
- Layout of the Sochi Autodrom

Race details
- Date: 29 September 2019
- Official name: Formula 1 VTB Russian Grand Prix 2019
- Location: Sochi Autodrom; Adlersky City District, Sochi, Krasnodar Krai, Russia
- Course: Permanent racing facility
- Course length: 5.848 km (3.634 miles)
- Distance: 53 laps, 309.745 km (192.467 miles)
- Weather: Partly cloudy

Pole position
Driver	(Monaco) Charles Leclerc	Ferrari
- Time: 1:31.628

Fastest lap
Driver	(United Kingdom) Lewis Hamilton	Mercedes
- Time: 1:35.761 on lap 51 (lap record)

Podium
First	(United Kingdom) Lewis Hamilton	Mercedes
Second	(Finland) Valtteri Bottas	Mercedes
Third	(Monaco) Charles Leclerc	Ferrari

The 2019 Russian Grand Prix (officially the Formula 1 VTB Russian Grand Prix 2019) was a Formula One motor race held on 29 September 2019 at the Sochi Autodrom in Sochi, Russia. The race was the 16th round of the 2019 Formula One World Championship and marked the 8th running of the Russian Grand Prix and the 6th time the race was held in Sochi.

== Background ==
=== Championship standings before the race ===
Entering the round Lewis Hamilton and Mercedes led the drivers and constructors championships by 65 and 133 points respectively. The size of their leads mean that both would still be leading their respective championships after the race regardless of the race's outcome.

=== Entries ===
The drivers and teams entered were the same as those for the previous race with no additional stand-in drivers for the race or practice.

== Qualifying ==
After Daniil Kvyat's car suffered an engine failure in the third practice session, a new engine was fitted and the car was not ready in time to take part in qualifying. During the first qualifying session, Alexander Albon lost control of the rear of his Red Bull at turn 13, sending him spinning into the barriers. Albon was uninjured, and the session was stopped as the car was recovered. The damaged floor of his car was replaced and this meant that Albon would be required to start the race from the pitlane.

During the third qualifying session, Charles Leclerc managed to achieve his fourth straight pole position in as many races, out-qualifying his team mate, Sebastian Vettel, for nine Grands Prix in a row.

=== Qualifying classification ===
Pos.	Car no.	Driver	Constructor	Qualifying times			Final grid
Pos.	Car no.	Driver	Constructor	Q1	Q2	Q3	Final grid
1	16	(Monaco) Charles Leclerc	Ferrari	1:33.613	1:32.434	1:31.628	1
2	44	(United Kingdom) Lewis Hamilton	Mercedes	1:33.230	1:33.134	1:32.030	2
3	5	(Germany) Sebastian Vettel	Ferrari	1:33.032	1:32.536	1:32.053	3
4	33	(Netherlands) Max Verstappen	Red Bull Racing-Honda	1:33.368	1:32.634	1:32.310	9^{a}
5	77	(Finland) Valtteri Bottas	Mercedes	1:33.413	1:33.281	1:32.632	4
6	55	(Spain) Carlos Sainz Jr.	McLaren-Renault	1:34.184	1:33.807	1:33.222	5
7	27	(Germany) Nico Hülkenberg	Renault	1:34.236	1:33.898	1:33.289	6
8	4	(United Kingdom) Lando Norris	McLaren-Renault	1:34.201	1:33.725	1:33.301	7
9	8	(France) Romain Grosjean	Haas-Ferrari	1:34.283	1:33.643	1:33.517	8
10	3	(Australia) Daniel Ricciardo	Renault	1:34.138	1:33.862	1:33.661	10
11	10	(France) Pierre Gasly	Scuderia Toro Rosso-Honda	1:34.456	1:33.950	N/A	16^{a}
12	11	(Mexico) Sergio Pérez	Racing Point-BWT Mercedes	1:34.336	1:33.958	N/A	11
13	99	(Italy) Antonio Giovinazzi	Alfa Romeo Racing-Ferrari	1:34.755	1:34.037	N/A	12
14	20	(Denmark) Kevin Magnussen	Haas-Ferrari	1:33.889	1:34.082	N/A	13
15	18	(Canada) Lance Stroll	Racing Point-BWT Mercedes	1:34.287	1:34.233	N/A	14
16	7	(Finland) Kimi Räikkönen	Alfa Romeo Racing-Ferrari	1:34.840	N/A	N/A	15
17	63	(United Kingdom) George Russell	Williams-Mercedes	1:35.356	N/A	N/A	17
18	88	(Poland) Robert Kubica	Williams-Mercedes	1:36.474	N/A	N/A	18^{b}
19	23	(Thailand) Alexander Albon	Red Bull Racing-Honda	1:39.197	N/A	N/A	PL^{c}
107% time: 1:39.544
—	26	(Russia) Daniil Kvyat	Scuderia Toro Rosso-Honda	No time	N/A	N/A	19^{d}

Notes

- ^a – Max Verstappen and Pierre Gasly both received a five-place grid penalty for exceeding their quota for power unit components.
- ^b – Robert Kubica was required to start from the back of the grid for exceeding his quota for power unit components.
- ^c – Alexander Albon initially received a five-place grid penalty for exceeding his quota for power unit components, but due to crashing in qualifying he was required to start the race from the pit lane for changing the floor.
- ^d – Daniil Kvyat was initially required to start from the back of the grid for exceeding his quota for power unit components, but he did not take part in qualifying and was allowed to race at the stewards' discretion.

== Race ==
Before the lights went out, Kimi Räikkönen made a false start and was later issued a drive-through penalty. As the cars set off, Sebastian Vettel was aided by the slipstream on the straight before turn two, overtaking Lewis Hamilton and pole-sitter Charles Leclerc for the lead. Carlos Sainz Jr. also benefited from this effect, overtaking Valtteri Bottas into the same corner. On the opening lap, Antonio Giovinazzi was squeezed by Romain Grosjean and Daniel Ricciardo going into turn five. Grosjean was launched into the barriers, causing his seventh retirement of the season. Ricciardo and Giovinazzi both took aerodynamic damage in the incident, with Ricciardo also suffering a left-rear tyre puncture, but both cars were able to continue the race for the time being. The safety car was deployed whilst Grosjean's car was recovered, during which Ricciardo and Robert Kubica made pit stops for new tyres. Williams then decided to pit Kubica again on the following lap to switch from hard to medium-compound tyres. The stewards later deemed the three-car collision a racing incident, and no action was taken.

Racing resumed at the end of lap three. During the following few laps, it emerged via team radio that Ferrari had anticipated Vettel would utilise the slipstream to overtake Leclerc at the start of the race. The team's plan was to build a gap to Hamilton in third, and then order Vettel to move aside and allow his teammate to retake the lead. However, Vettel refused to yield, claiming that Leclerc was too far behind and slowing to let his teammate through would risk also letting Hamilton through. Bottas made it past Sainz's McLaren on lap seven, and by lap 17, Max Verstappen had passed Sainz to take fifth place after starting the race in ninth.

After Leclerc had previously told his team over radio that he expected to be swapped with Vettel later into the race, Ferrari brought him in for a pit stop at the end of lap 22. Vettel was left out until the end of lap 26, by which point his tyres had degraded and he emerged from the pits behind his teammate, as Leclerc had requested. At the same time, Ricciardo's car was retired from the race after Renault decided that the damage suffered in the first lap incident was too great to continue. On his out-lap from the pits, Vettel reported the failure of the MGU-K, a part of the car's hybrid power unit. Initially hoping he could make it back to the pits to avoid a safety car being deployed, he was forced to pull over to the side of the track at turn 16 after the team were concerned that going any further would cause more damage to the car. A virtual safety car period was initiated whilst Vettel's car was recovered, during which the two leading Mercedes cars made their pit stops, allowing Hamilton to take over the lead of the race from Leclerc.

On lap 28, during the virtual safety car period, George Russell went straight on at turn nine and into the barriers. Williams later revealed that this was caused by a wheel nut issue. At the end of the same lap, Williams decided to retire Kubica in order to conserve parts for the next race, leading to a double retirement for the team. The virtual safety car was upgraded to a full safety car after Russell's crash. Ferrari brought Leclerc in for a pit stop on lap 30, during the safety car, switching him to soft-compound tyres, the same as the leading Mercedes cars even though it meant Leclerc dropped from second to third place.

The safety car came in on lap 33. During the next 20 laps, Leclerc attempted to catch up with and overtake Bottas, but was ultimately unsuccessful. Kevin Magnussen ran wide at turn two on lap 44 after an overtake attempt by Sergio Pérez. Magnussen failed to drive around both penalty bollards, and was later issued with a 5-second time penalty as a result. This dropped him from eighth to ninth place at the end of the race. Alexander Albon, who started the race from the pit lane and was in ninth place at the safety car restart, fought through the field and overtook Sainz for fifth place on lap 49, equalling his best career finish. Hamilton crossed the line to take victory, marking his and Mercedes's first win since the summer break, and Bottas finishing second resulted in the first Mercedes 1–2 finish since the British Grand Prix.

=== Race classification ===
Pos.	No.	Driver	Constructor	Laps	Time/Retired	Grid	Points
1	44	(United Kingdom) Lewis Hamilton	Mercedes	53	1:33:38.992	2	26^{1}
2	77	(Finland) Valtteri Bottas	Mercedes	53	+3.829	4	18
3	16	(Monaco) Charles Leclerc	Ferrari	53	+5.212	1	15
4	33	(Netherlands) Max Verstappen	Red Bull Racing-Honda	53	+14.210	9	12
5	23	(Thailand) Alexander Albon	Red Bull Racing-Honda	53	+38.348	PL	10
6	55	(Spain) Carlos Sainz Jr.	McLaren-Renault	53	+45.889	5	8
7	11	(Mexico) Sergio Pérez	Racing Point-BWT Mercedes	53	+48.728	11	6
8	4	(United Kingdom) Lando Norris	McLaren-Renault	53	+57.749	7	4
9	20	(Denmark) Kevin Magnussen	Haas-Ferrari	53	+58.779^{2}	13	2
10	27	(Germany) Nico Hülkenberg	Renault	53	+59.841	6	1
11	18	(Canada) Lance Stroll	Racing Point-BWT Mercedes	53	+1:00.821	14	
12	26	(Russia) Daniil Kvyat	Scuderia Toro Rosso-Honda	53	+1:02.496	19	
13	7	(Finland) Kimi Räikkönen	Alfa Romeo Racing-Ferrari	53	+1:08.910	15	
14	10	(France) Pierre Gasly	Scuderia Toro Rosso-Honda	53	+1:10.076	16	
15	99	(Italy) Antonio Giovinazzi	Alfa Romeo Racing-Ferrari	53	+1:13.346	12	
Ret	88	(Poland) Robert Kubica	Williams-Mercedes	30	Withdrew	18	
Ret	63	(United Kingdom) George Russell	Williams-Mercedes	29	Wheel/Accident	17	
Ret	5	(Germany) Sebastian Vettel	Ferrari	28	Power loss	3	
Ret	3	(Australia) Daniel Ricciardo	Renault	27	Collision damage	10	
Ret	8	(France) Romain Grosjean	Haas-Ferrari	0	Collision	8	
Fastest lap: (United Kingdom) Lewis Hamilton (Mercedes) – 1:35.761 (lap 51)

Notes

- ^1 – Includes one point for fastest lap.
- ^2 – Kevin Magnussen originally finished 8th, but received a five-second time penalty for leaving the track and not re-joining as instructed.

== Championship standings after the race ==
Drivers' Championship standings

Pos.	Driver	Points
1	(United Kingdom) Lewis Hamilton*	322
2	(Finland) Valtteri Bottas*	249
3	(Monaco) Charles Leclerc*	215
4	(Netherlands) Max Verstappen*	212
5	(Germany) Sebastian Vettel*	194

Constructors' Championship standings

Pos.	Constructor	Points
1	(Germany) Mercedes*	571
2	(Italy) Ferrari*	409
3	(Austria) Red Bull Racing-Honda	311
4	(United Kingdom) McLaren-Renault	101
5	(France) Renault	68

- Note: Only the top five positions are included for both sets of standings.
- Bold text and an asterisk indicates competitors who still had a theoretical chance of becoming World Champion.

== See also ==
- 2019 Sochi Formula 2 round
- 2019 Sochi Formula 3 round

Previous race: 2019 Singapore Grand Prix	FIA Formula One World Championship; 2019 season	Next race: 2019 Japanese Grand Prix
Previous race: 2018 Russian Grand Prix	Russian Grand Prix	Next race: 2020 Russian Grand Prix
