= 2017 Russian Grand Prix =

Race 4 of 20 in the 2017 Formula One World Championship
| ← Previous race | Next race → |
- Layout of the Sochi Autodrom

Race details
- Date: 30 April 2017
- Official name: 2017 Formula 1 VTB Russian Grand Prix
- Location: Sochi Autodrom, Adlersky City District, Sochi, Krasnodar Krai, Russia
- Course: Permanent racing facility
- Course length: 5.848 km (3.634 miles)
- Distance: 52 laps, 303.897 km (188.833 miles)
- Scheduled distance: 53 laps, 309.745 km (192.467 miles)
- Weather: Sunny
- Attendance: 150,000

Pole position
| Driver | (Germany) Sebastian Vettel | Ferrari |
- Time: 1:33.194

Fastest lap
| Driver | (Finland) Kimi Räikkönen | Ferrari |
- Time: 1:36.844 on lap 49

Podium
| First | (Finland) Valtteri Bottas | Mercedes |
| Second | (Germany) Sebastian Vettel | Ferrari |
| Third | (Finland) Kimi Räikkönen | Ferrari |

The 2017 Russian Grand Prix (Russian: Гран-при России 2017 года, romanized: Gran-pri Rossii 2017 goda), officially known as the 2017 Formula 1 VTB Russian Grand Prix, was a Formula One motor race that took place on 30 April 2017 as the fourth round of the 2017 FIA Formula One World Championship. The fifty-two lap race was held at the Sochi Autodrom, marking the fourth running of the Russian Grand Prix as a round of the Formula One World Championship. Sebastian Vettel started the race from pole, with his teammate Kimi Räikkönen in second in Ferrari's first front-row lockout since the 2008 French Grand Prix. Valtteri Bottas won the race, taking his first win in Formula 1 by 0.617 seconds over Vettel, the smallest winning margin since the 2016 Abu Dhabi Grand Prix.

Going into the race, Vettel led Lewis Hamilton in the World Drivers' Championship by seven points, with Bottas third; they remained in the same order after the race. In the World Constructors' Championship, Ferrari was in the lead ahead of Mercedes before the race, with Red Bull Racing third; Mercedes was ahead of Ferrari after the race.

== Report ==
=== Background ===
==== Driver changes ====
Sergey Sirotkin made his first appearance of the season with Renault, driving in place of Nico Hülkenberg in the first free practice session.

==== Race ====
The initial start was aborted, as Fernando Alonso was unable to start, pulling up in the opening to the pit lane because of engine issues. Team radio from the initial parade lap suggested issues with the MGU-K electronic power supplementary unit leading to a loss of hybrid power. Without the energy recovery system (ERS), the MCL32 would be uncompetitive and racing would put an unnecessary wear upon the rest of the power unit. Alonso's McLaren teammate Stoffel Vandoorne had already been given a 15-place grid penalty, having exceeded the limit of four exchanges of power unit per driver and car throughout the season stipulated by the 2017 regulations. With Alonso's car already being at least partially on its fourth power unit of the season on only race 4 out of 20, in the light of the charge failure, a decision was made to retire Alonso from the race in order to preserve the car. Alonso was unable to even complete the formation lap, suffering from a total car failure before being able to return to the pitlane. Carlos Sainz Jr. was given a 3-place penalty as a result of causing a collision with Lance Stroll at the Bahrain Grand Prix.

Because of Alonso's car obstructing the track, the start was aborted by the FIA's race director Charlie Whiting, and the cars were sent on an additional formation lap. The race was accordingly shortened by a lap. Valtteri Bottas attained his maiden victory after taking first place at the start, passing both Ferraris before turn 2 – aided by starting from the clean side of the grid, and picking up the slipstream behind Vettel. Hamilton attempted the same, but was squeezed on both sides by the Ferrari of Räikkönen, now running 3rd – and Ricciardo of Red Bull, challenging for 4th from 5th. This caused him to be held up and hemmed into his starting grid position, where he would stay for the remainder of the race. Vettel meanwhile pulled away from tight racing of the main straight, and pursued Bottas. Vettel briefly led the race when Bottas went into the pits following his one-stop strategy, but then lost his position again after his own pit stop. He again spent the final third of the race gradually closing the distance between himself and Bottas, coming to within 0.7 seconds just a few laps before the end. Lapped traffic, particularly the delayed Williams of Massa, however, ultimately prevented him from overtaking the race leader, leading to a secure second place for the German. Kimi Räikkönen rounded off the podium. He once again set a late fastest lap of 1:36.844 on lap 49, recording not only the fast lap of the race, but also the fastest ever lap at the circuit. At the chequered flag, he was followed by Lewis Hamilton, finishing a distant 4th. Hamilton had struggled with overheating throughout the race.

Non-finishers were Fernando Alonso, who failed to make it to the grid with a hybrid-charge failure, as well as Jolyon Palmer and Romain Grosjean who crashed on the first lap, causing a safety car deployment. Daniel Ricciardo retired with brake problems while running in 7th. Felipe Massa was running in 6th when he obtained a slow puncture and had to pit for new tyres, falling to 9th behind the Force Indias of Sergio Pérez and Esteban Ocon as well as the Renault of Nico Hülkenberg.

There were very few on-track overtakes after the safety car period. Despite making up two places before turn 2, Max Verstappen's Red Bull did not advance further, finishing in 5th, a minute behind Bottas, once again showing Red Bull's struggles to keep up with Ferrari and Mercedes. The team's problems were compounded by the retirement of Daniel Ricciardo, their third mechanical failure in four races.

== Classification ==
=== Qualifying ===
| Pos. | Car no. | Driver | Constructor | Qualifying times | | | Final grid |
| Pos. | Car no. | Driver | Constructor | Q1 | Q2 | Q3 | Final grid |
|---|---|---|---|---|---|---|---|
| 1 | 5 | (Germany) Sebastian Vettel | Ferrari | 1:34.493 | 1:34.038 | 1:33.194 | 1 |
| 2 | 7 | (Finland) Kimi Räikkönen | Ferrari | 1:34.953 | 1:33.663 | 1:33.253 | 2 |
| 3 | 77 | (Finland) Valtteri Bottas | Mercedes | 1:34.041 | 1:33.264 | 1:33.289 | 3 |
| 4 | 44 | (United Kingdom) Lewis Hamilton | Mercedes | 1:34.409 | 1:33.760 | 1:33.767 | 4 |
| 5 | 3 | (Australia) Daniel Ricciardo | Red Bull Racing-TAG Heuer | 1:35.560 | 1:35.483 | 1:34.905 | 5 |
| 6 | 19 | (Brazil) Felipe Massa | Williams-Mercedes | 1:35.828 | 1:35.049 | 1:35.110 | 6 |
| 7 | 33 | (Netherlands) Max Verstappen | Red Bull Racing-TAG Heuer | 1:35.301 | 1:35.221 | 1:35.161 | 7 |
| 8 | 27 | (Germany) Nico Hülkenberg | Renault | 1:35.507 | 1:35.328 | 1:35.285 | 8 |
| 9 | 11 | (Mexico) Sergio Pérez | Force India-Mercedes | 1:36.185 | 1:35.513 | 1:35.337 | 9 |
| 10 | 31 | (France) Esteban Ocon | Force India-Mercedes | 1:35.372 | 1:35.729 | 1:35.430 | 10 |
| 11 | 55 | (Spain) Carlos Sainz Jr. | Toro Rosso | 1:35.827 | 1:35.948 | | 14^{1} |
| 12 | 18 | (Canada) Lance Stroll | Williams-Mercedes | 1:36.279 | 1:35.964 | | 11 |
| 13 | 26 | (Russia) Daniil Kvyat | Toro Rosso | 1:35.984 | 1:35.968 | | 12 |
| 14 | 20 | (Denmark) Kevin Magnussen | Haas-Ferrari | 1:36.408 | 1:36.017 | | 13 |
| 15 | 14 | (Spain) Fernando Alonso | McLaren-Honda | 1:36.353 | 1:36.660 | | 15 |
| 16 | 30 | (United Kingdom) Jolyon Palmer | Renault | 1:36.462 | | | 16 |
| 17 | 2 | (Belgium) Stoffel Vandoorne | McLaren-Honda | 1:37.070 | | | 20^{2} |
| 18 | 94 | (Germany) Pascal Wehrlein | Sauber-Ferrari | 1:37.332 | | | 17 |
| 19 | 9 | (Sweden) Marcus Ericsson | Sauber-Ferrari | 1:37.507 | | | 18 |
| 20 | 8 | (France) Romain Grosjean | Haas-Ferrari | 1:37.620 | | | 19 |
107% time: 1:40.623

Notes

- ^1 – Carlos Sainz, Jr. was given a three-place grid penalty for causing an avoidable accident with Lance Stroll at the 2017 Bahrain Grand Prix.
- ^2 – Stoffel Vandoorne received a fifteen-place grid penalty for changing various engine components.

=== Race ===
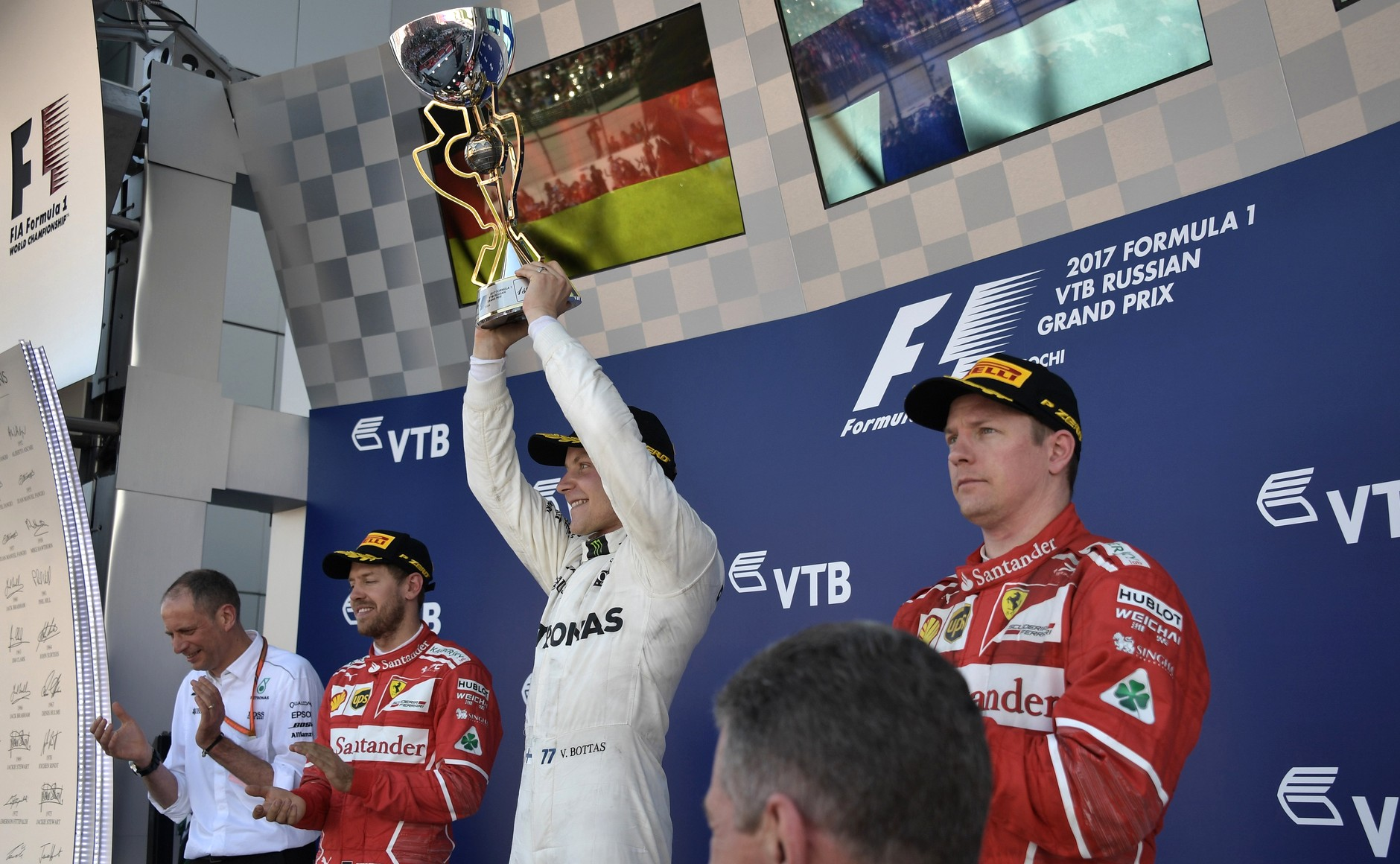
The podium, from right to left, Kimi Räikkönen, Valtteri Bottas and Sebastian Vettel.

| Pos. | No. | Driver | Constructor | Laps | Time/Retired | Grid | Points |
|---|---|---|---|---|---|---|---|
| 1 | 77 | (Finland) Valtteri Bottas | Mercedes | 52 | 1:28:08.743 | 3 | 25 |
| 2 | 5 | (Germany) Sebastian Vettel | Ferrari | 52 | +0.617 | 1 | 18 |
| 3 | 7 | (Finland) Kimi Räikkönen | Ferrari | 52 | +11.000 | 2 | 15 |
| 4 | 44 | (United Kingdom) Lewis Hamilton | Mercedes | 52 | +36.230 | 4 | 12 |
| 5 | 33 | (Netherlands) Max Verstappen | Red Bull Racing-TAG Heuer | 52 | +1:00.416 | 7 | 10 |
| 6 | 11 | (Mexico) Sergio Pérez | Force India-Mercedes | 52 | +1:26.788 | 9 | 8 |
| 7 | 31 | (France) Esteban Ocon | Force India-Mercedes | 52 | +1:35.004 | 10 | 6 |
| 8 | 27 | (Germany) Nico Hülkenberg | Renault | 52 | +1:36.188 | 8 | 4 |
| 9 | 19 | (Brazil) Felipe Massa | Williams-Mercedes | 51 | +1 Lap | 6 | 2 |
| 10 | 55 | (Spain) Carlos Sainz Jr. | Toro Rosso | 51 | +1 Lap | 14 | 1 |
| 11 | 18 | (Canada) Lance Stroll | Williams-Mercedes | 51 | +1 Lap | 11 | |
| 12 | 26 | (Russia) Daniil Kvyat | Toro Rosso | 51 | +1 Lap | 12 | |
| 13 | 20 | (Denmark) Kevin Magnussen | Haas-Ferrari | 51 | +1 Lap | 13 | |
| 14 | 2 | (Belgium) Stoffel Vandoorne | McLaren-Honda | 51 | +1 Lap | 20 | |
| 15 | 9 | (Sweden) Marcus Ericsson | Sauber-Ferrari | 51 | +1 Lap | 18 | |
| 16 | 94 | (Germany) Pascal Wehrlein | Sauber-Ferrari | 50 | +2 Laps | 17 | |
| Ret | 3 | (Australia) Daniel Ricciardo | Red Bull Racing-TAG Heuer | 5 | Brakes | 5 | |
| Ret | 30 | (United Kingdom) Jolyon Palmer | Renault | 0 | Collision | 16 | |
| Ret | 8 | (France) Romain Grosjean | Haas-Ferrari | 0 | Collision | 19 | |
| DNS | 14 | (Spain) Fernando Alonso | McLaren-Honda | 0 | Gearbox | –^{1} | |

==== Notes ====
- ^1 – Fernando Alonso's car failed during the first formation lap. His place on the grid was left vacant.

== Championship standings after the race ==
Drivers' Championship standings

| Pos. | Driver | Points |
|---|---|---|
| 1 | (Germany) Sebastian Vettel | 86 |
| 2 | (United Kingdom) Lewis Hamilton | 73 |
| 3 | (Finland) Valtteri Bottas | 63 |
| 4 | (Finland) Kimi Räikkönen | 49 |
| 5 | (Netherlands) Max Verstappen | 35 |

Constructors' Championship standings

| | Pos. | Constructor | Points |
|---|---|---|---|
| 1 | 1 | (Germany) Mercedes | 136 |
| 1 | 2 | (Italy) Ferrari | 135 |
| | 3 | (Austria) Red Bull Racing-TAG Heuer | 57 |
| | 4 | Force India-Mercedes | 31 |
| | 5 | (United Kingdom) Williams-Mercedes | 18 |

- Note: Only the top five positions are included for both sets of standings.

| Previous race: 2017 Bahrain Grand Prix | FIA Formula One World Championship; 2017 season | Next race: 2017 Spanish Grand Prix |
| Previous race: 2016 Russian Grand Prix | Russian Grand Prix | Next race: 2018 Russian Grand Prix |
