= 2020 Russian Grand Prix =

Formula One motor race

Race 10 of 17 (Note: The outbreak of the COVID-19 pandemic saw several Grands Prix cancelled or rescheduled. The revised calendar consisted of seventeen races.) in the 2020 Formula One World Championship
← Previous race	Next race →
- Layout of the Sochi Autodrom

Race details
- Date: 27 September 2020
- Official name: Formula 1 VTB Russian Grand Prix 2020
- Location: Sochi Autodrom; Adlersky City District, Sochi, Krasnodar Krai, Russia
- Course: Permanent racing facility
- Course length: 5.848 km (3.634 miles)
- Distance: 53 laps, 309.745 km (192.467 miles)
- Weather: Sunny

Pole position
Driver	(United Kingdom) Lewis Hamilton	Mercedes
- Time: 1:31.304

Fastest lap
Driver	(Finland) Valtteri Bottas	Mercedes
- Time: 1:37.030 on lap 51

Podium
First	(Finland) Valtteri Bottas	Mercedes
Second	(Netherlands) Max Verstappen	Red Bull Racing-Honda
Third	(United Kingdom) Lewis Hamilton	Mercedes

The 2020 Russian Grand Prix (officially known as the Formula 1 VTB Russian Grand Prix 2020) was a Formula One motor race held on 27 September 2020 at the Sochi Autodrom in Sochi, Russia. The race was the tenth round of the 2020 Formula One World Championship, ninth running of the Russian Grand Prix and the seventh time held in Sochi. The 53-lap race was won by Valtteri Bottas of the Mercedes team, with Max Verstappen of Red Bull placing 2nd, and Lewis Hamilton taking the final podium place.

== Background ==
This race was Scuderia Ferrari's 1000th start in a World Championship event as a team.

=== Impact of the COVID-19 pandemic ===
The 2020 championship was heavily affected by the COVID-19 pandemic. Most of the originally planned Grands Prix were cancelled or postponed, prompting the Fédération Internationale de l'Automobile to draft a new calendar. Ahead of the Russian Grand Prix, Formula One confirmed that it had recorded the biggest coronavirus spike of the year.

In spite of this, the Russian Grand Prix kept its original date. Up to 30,000 fans were expected to attend the race with social distancing measures in place. McLaren driver, Lando Norris, noted the lack of meet and greets and photo opportunities with fans. Haas driver Romain Grosjean expressed discomfort over the handling of the pandemic situation at his hotel.

=== Entrants ===
Ten teams (each representing a different constructor) each entered two drivers. The drivers and teams were the same as those on the season entry list with no additional stand-in drivers for either the race or practice.

=== Tyres ===
Sole Formula One tyre manufacturer Pirelli supplied their C3, C4 and C5 compound tyres for teams to use in the race, the three softest compounds available.

== Practice ==
The first free practice session ended with Mercedes driver Valtteri Bottas quickest, followed by Daniel Ricciardo of Renault and Max Verstappen of Red Bull. The session was disrupted first by McLaren driver Carlos Sainz Jr.'s spin in turn seven, which caused damage to his rear wing and triggered a virtual safety car. Nicholas Latifi of Williams spun in turn ten causing severe damage to his car and triggering another red flag.

The second practice session ended with Bottas ahead of teammate Lewis Hamilton and Ricciardo. The third practice session ended with Hamilton fastest ahead of Bottas and Sainz Jr.

== Qualifying ==
Hamilton took pole, 0.563s ahead of Red Bull’s Max Verstappen. Valtteri Bottas finished 3rd with Sergio Pérez in 4th for Racing Point. Renault’s Daniel Ricciardo qualified 5th followed by Carlos Sainz Jr., Esteban Ocon, Lando Norris, Pierre Gasly and Alexander Albon.

Out in Q1 (the first part of qualifying) were Romain Grosjean, Antonio Giovinazzi, Kevin Magnussen, Nicholas Latifi and Kimi Räikkönen. In Q2, Charles Leclerc finished 11th, missing out on Q3 after his teammate Sebastian Vettel crashed, bringing out the red flag and Hamilton making it to the line to set his final lap in Q2 seconds before the chequered flag came out to end the session. Daniil Kvyat was 12th followed by Lance Stroll, whose engine overheated preventing him from going out for a second run in Q2, Williams driver George Russell and Vettel.

=== Qualifying classification ===
Pos.	No.	Driver	Constructor	Qualifying times			Final grid
Pos.	No.	Driver	Constructor	Q1	Q2	Q3	Final grid
1	44	(United Kingdom) Lewis Hamilton	Mercedes	1:32.983	1:32.835	1:31.304	1
2	33	(Netherlands) Max Verstappen	Red Bull Racing-Honda	1:33.630	1:33.157	1:31.867	2
3	77	(Finland) Valtteri Bottas	Mercedes	1:32.656	1:32.405	1:31.956	3
4	11	(Mexico) Sergio Pérez	Racing Point-BWT Mercedes	1:33.704	1:33.038	1:32.317	4
5	3	(Australia) Daniel Ricciardo	Renault	1:33.650	1:32.218	1:32.364	5
6	55	(Spain) Carlos Sainz Jr.	McLaren-Renault	1:33.967	1:32.757	1:32.550	6
7	31	(France) Esteban Ocon	Renault	1:33.557	1:33.196	1:32.624	7
8	4	(United Kingdom) Lando Norris	McLaren-Renault	1:33.804	1:33.081	1:32.847	8
9	10	(France) Pierre Gasly	AlphaTauri-Honda	1:33.734	1:33.139	1:33.000	9
10	23	(Thailand) Alexander Albon	Red Bull Racing-Honda	1:33.919	1:33.153	1:33.008	15^{a}
11	16	(Monaco) Charles Leclerc	Ferrari	1:34.071	1:33.239	N/A	10
12	26	(Russia) Daniil Kvyat	AlphaTauri-Honda	1:33.511	1:33.249	N/A	11
13	18	(Canada) Lance Stroll	Racing Point-BWT Mercedes	1:33.852	1:33.364	N/A	12
14	63	(United Kingdom) George Russell	Williams-Mercedes	1:34.020	1:33.583	N/A	13
15	5	(Germany) Sebastian Vettel	Ferrari	1:34.134	1:33.609	N/A	14
16	8	(France) Romain Grosjean	Haas-Ferrari	1:34.592	N/A	N/A	16
17	99	(Italy) Antonio Giovinazzi	Alfa Romeo Racing-Ferrari	1:34.594	N/A	N/A	17
18	20	(Denmark) Kevin Magnussen	Haas-Ferrari	1:34.681	N/A	N/A	18
19	6	(Canada) Nicholas Latifi	Williams-Mercedes	1:35.066	N/A	N/A	20^{a}
20	7	(Finland) Kimi Räikkönen	Alfa Romeo Racing-Ferrari	1:35.267	N/A	N/A	19
107% time: 1:39.141

- ^a – Alexander Albon and Nicholas Latifi both received a five-place grid penalty for an unscheduled gearbox change.

== Race ==
Kimi Räikkönen started his 322nd Grand Prix, tying Rubens Barrichello's record. Carlos Sainz Jr. took to the run off area and hit the wall trying to rejoin the circuit at the race start. Charles Leclerc collided with Lance Stroll causing the latter to hit a wall. The safety car was sent out to clear the debris at the second turn.

Lewis Hamilton was handed down two 5-second penalties for doing practice starts outside the designated areas, which he served on his first pitstop. Hamilton was also initially given two penalty points on his FIA Super Licence which would have left him on 10 penalty points for the last 12 months period, only two penalty points short of a race ban. However, these penalty points were rescinded after stewards received information that team radio communications had advised Hamilton about where he could or could not do a practice start and the team was fined instead for their error. Both Daniel Ricciardo and Alexander Albon were given a 5-second penalty for exceeding the track limits at turn 2.

The race was won by Valtteri Bottas ahead of Max Verstappen and Hamilton. The result left Hamilton leading the championship with 205 points from teammate Bottas on 161 points.

=== Race classification ===
Pos.	No.	Driver	Constructor	Laps	Time/Retired	Grid	Points
1	77	(Finland) Valtteri Bottas	Mercedes	53	1:34:00.364	3	26^{1}
2	33	(Netherlands) Max Verstappen	Red Bull Racing-Honda	53	+7.729	2	18
3	44	(United Kingdom) Lewis Hamilton	Mercedes	53	+22.729	1	15
4	11	(Mexico) Sergio Pérez	Racing Point-BWT Mercedes	53	+30.558	4	12
5	3	(Australia) Daniel Ricciardo	Renault	53	+52.065^{2}	5	10
6	16	(Monaco) Charles Leclerc	Ferrari	53	+1:02.186	10	8
7	31	(France) Esteban Ocon	Renault	53	+1:08.006	7	6
8	26	(Russia) Daniil Kvyat	AlphaTauri-Honda	53	+1:08.740	11	4
9	10	(France) Pierre Gasly	AlphaTauri-Honda	53	+1:29.766	9	2
10	23	(Thailand) Alexander Albon	Red Bull Racing-Honda	53	+1:37.860^{2}	15	1
11	99	(Italy) Antonio Giovinazzi	Alfa Romeo Racing-Ferrari	52	+1 lap	17	
12	20	(Denmark) Kevin Magnussen	Haas-Ferrari	52	+1 lap	18	
13	5	(Germany) Sebastian Vettel	Ferrari	52	+1 lap	14	
14	7	(Finland) Kimi Räikkönen	Alfa Romeo Racing-Ferrari	52	+1 lap	19	
15	4	(United Kingdom) Lando Norris	McLaren-Renault	52	+1 lap	8	
16	6	(Canada) Nicholas Latifi	Williams-Mercedes	52	+1 lap	20	
17	8	(France) Romain Grosjean	Haas-Ferrari	52	+1 lap	16	
18	63	(United Kingdom) George Russell	Williams-Mercedes	52	+1 lap	13	
Ret	55	(Spain) Carlos Sainz Jr.	McLaren-Renault	0	Accident	6	
Ret	18	(Canada) Lance Stroll	Racing Point-BWT Mercedes	0	Collision	12	
Fastest lap: (Finland) Valtteri Bottas (Mercedes) – 1:37.030 (lap 51)

Notes

- ^1 – Includes one point for fastest lap.
- ^2 – Daniel Ricciardo and Alexander Albon both received a five-second time penalty for failing to follow the race director's instructions at turn 2.

== Championship standings after the race ==
Drivers' Championship standings

Pos.	Driver	Points
1	(United Kingdom) Lewis Hamilton	205
2	(Finland) Valtteri Bottas	161
3	(Netherlands) Max Verstappen	128
4	(United Kingdom) Lando Norris	65
5	(Thailand) Alexander Albon	64

Constructors' Championship standings

Pos.	Constructor	Points
1	(Germany) Mercedes	366
2	(Austria) Red Bull Racing-Honda	192
3	(United Kingdom) McLaren-Renault	106
4	(United Kingdom) Racing Point-BWT Mercedes	104 (Note: Racing Point was deducted 15 points after a protest from Renault was upheld regarding the legality of their car.)
5	(France) Renault	99

- Note: Only the top five positions are included for both sets of standings.

== See also ==
- 2020 Sochi Formula 2 round

== Notes ==
Previous race: 2020 Tuscan Grand Prix	FIA Formula One World Championship; 2020 season	Next race: 2020 Eifel Grand Prix
Previous race: 2019 Russian Grand Prix	Russian Grand Prix	Next race: 2021 Russian Grand Prix
