= Russian Grand Prix =

Formula One motor race in Sochi

- Sochi Autodrom

Race information
- Number of times held: 10
- First held: 1913
- Last held: 2021
- Most wins (drivers): (United Kingdom) Lewis Hamilton (5)
- Most wins (constructors): (Germany) Mercedes (8)
- Circuit length: 5.848 km (3.634 miles)
- Race length: 309.745 km (192.466 miles)
- Laps: 53

Last race (2021)

Pole position
- (United Kingdom) Lando Norris; McLaren-Mercedes; 1:41.993

Podium
- 1. (United Kingdom) Lewis Hamilton; Mercedes; 1:30:41.001; 2. (Netherlands) Max Verstappen; Red Bull Racing-Honda; +53.271; 3. (Spain) Carlos Sainz Jr.; Ferrari; +1:02.475

Fastest lap
- (United Kingdom) Lando Norris; McLaren-Mercedes; 1:37.423

The Russian Grand Prix (Russian: Гран-при России, romanized: Gran-pri Rossii) was an annual motor racing event held at Sochi Autodrom – a permanent circuit built around the Olympic Park in Sochi – as part of the Formula One World Championship.

The race was first held briefly in the 1910s in Saint Petersburg of the Russian Empire. Plans were made to host a Formula One event in Moscow for the 1983 season as the Grand Prix of the Soviet Union scheduled for 21 August, but these plans fell through due to bureaucratic barriers. In 2010, it was announced that the Russian city of Sochi, which was also preparing to host the 2014 Winter Olympics, would host a new event on the Formula One calendar, beginning in 2014 under a seven-year deal.

In 2021, a contract was signed with the intention of moving the event to Igora Drive (about 54 km (34 mi) north of Saint Petersburg) starting from 2023 onwards. Igora Drive, which was opened in 2019, was due to have an extension to the track built, taking the original layout from 4.086 km (2.539 mi) and 15 turns to 5.182 km (3.220 mi) and 19 turns in time for the 2023 race.

The 2022 event was cancelled in the wake of the Russian invasion of Ukraine, before the contract for all future races was terminated also due to the invasion.

The event is notable for having only ever been won by Mercedes during the race's establishment as a World Championship event.

== 1910s ==
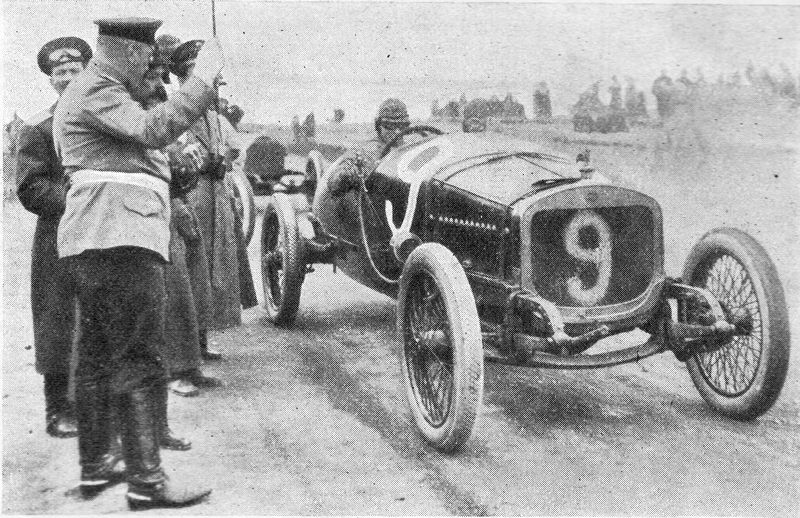
The 1913 race beginning

The Russian Grand Prix was run twice, first in 1913 and then 1914 at a circuit in Saint Petersburg. The first race was won by Russian racing driver Georgy Suvorin, whilst German Willy Scholl won the 1914 event. Following the outbreak of the First World War and the Russian Civil War, the Russian Grand Prix was abandoned, and it was not resumed after the abolition of the Russian Empire and establishment of the Soviet Union.

=== 1913 race results ===
1. (Russia) Georgy Suvorin (Benz) 2:23:54.6
2. (Russia) Ivan Ivanov (Russo-Balt) +2:56.4
3. (France) René Nothombe (Métallurgique) +5:24.4

=== 1914 race results ===
1. (Germany) Willy Scholl (Benz) 1:48:32.2
2. (Russia) Stepan Ovsyannikov (Vauxhall) +10:31.6
3. (Italy) Eugenio Beria d'Argentine (Aquila Italiana) +13:08.6

== Formula One ==
=== Sochi Autodrom (2014–2021) ===
Plans for a Grand Prix in Russia emerged in the early 1980s, with a proposed circuit in Moscow to be run under the title of the "Grand Prix of the Soviet Union". The race was included on a provisional calendar for 1983, but bureaucratic barriers imposed under the Andropov regime prevented the Grand Prix from being held, and the race was removed from all subsequent revisions of the calendar. Nevertheless, Bernie Ecclestone continued in his quest to organise a race behind the Iron Curtain. Instead, Hungary became the first communist country to host a race, joining the calendar in 1986. There would never be a Grand Prix in the Soviet Union as it would collapse at the end of 1991.

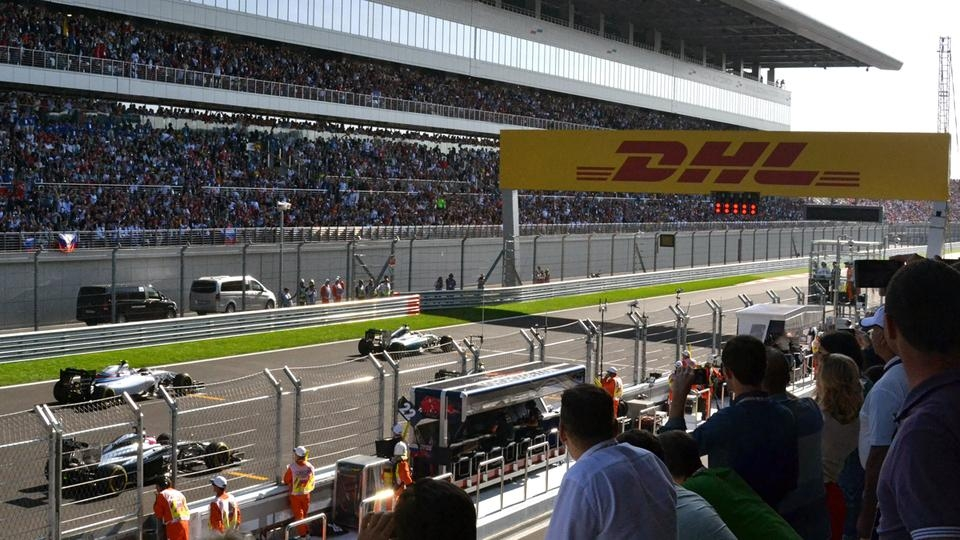
The starting grid at the 2014 Russian Grand Prix

In 2001, Vladimir Putin, President of Russia, expressed personal support to the project of the "Pulkovskoe Ring" near the Pulkovo Airport, but the race never came to fruition. Another attempt was made in 2003, with the Moscow council approving a project to build a track in Molzhaninovsky District of Moscow. The project was abandoned after a dispute over the commercial contract. In September 2008, it was revealed that work was to begin on a Formula One circuit to be located at the village of Fedyukovo, Volokolamsky District of the Moscow Province, approximately 77 kilometres (48 mi) away from Moscow. Known as the Moscow Raceway, the track was designed by Hermann Tilke to host both Formula One and MotoGP races. The plan to host a Grand Prix at the Moscow Raceway was never realised, but unlike the Pulkovskoe Ring and Nagatino Island projects, the circuit was completed, and in 2012, hosted rounds of the Formula Renault 3.5 and 2.0 Series – which became the first internationally accredited motorsport events to hold a round in Russia – as well as the FIA GT1 World Championship, and the Superbike World Championship.

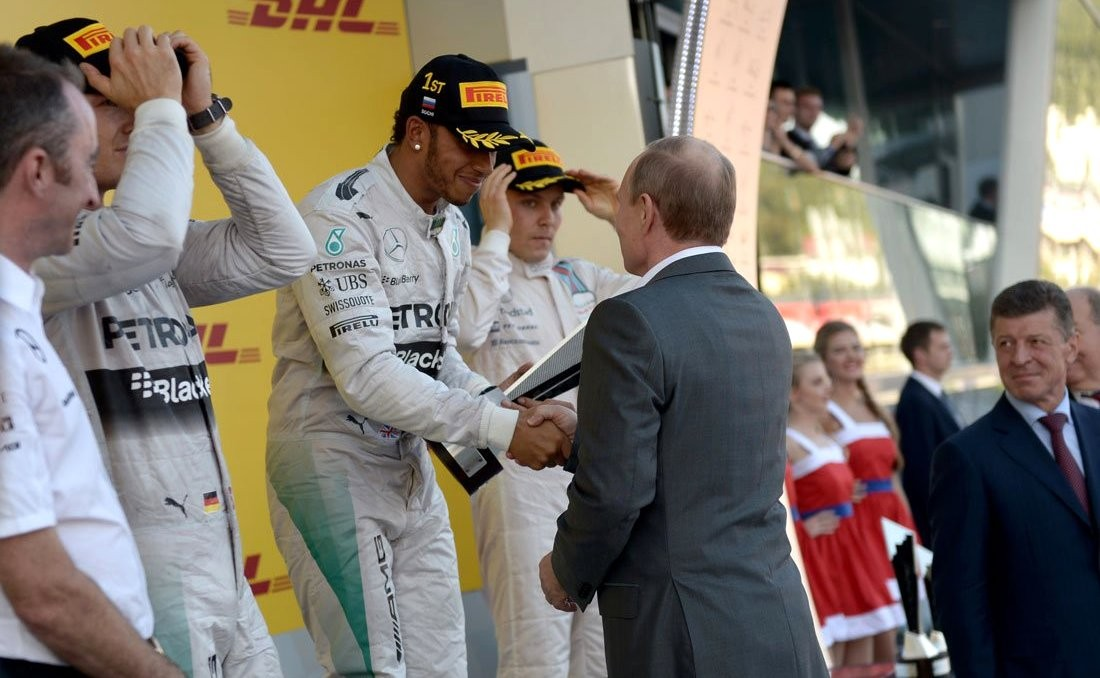
President Putin congratulates Lewis Hamilton, the winner of 2014 Russian GP

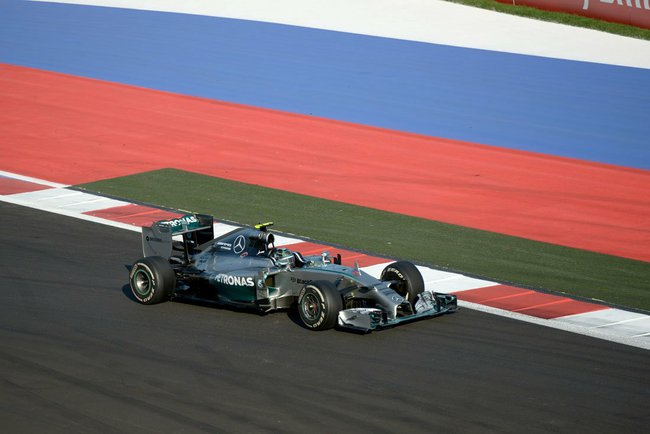
Nico Rosberg at Russian GP 2014

Vitaly Petrov became Russia's first Formula One driver in 2010, when he joined Renault, adding further momentum to the project. Bernie Ecclestone expressed a desire to see Formula One travel to Russia at a circuit in or near Moscow or at the resort city of Sochi. After several decades of attempting to re-establish the race, the new Russian Grand Prix was officially announced on 14 October 2010 for a debut in 2014, running through to 2020. The race was held in the Sochi, the host city of the 2014 Winter Olympics, at the Sochi Autodrom – a 5.9 km street circuit which passes around the venues of Sochi's Olympic Park.

==== Race summaries ====
The inaugural event was held on 12 October 2014, and was won by British driver Lewis Hamilton, followed by German driver Nico Rosberg, both from the Mercedes-Benz team, and Valtteri Bottas, of Williams. Mercedes' one-two finish also saw them claim their first constructors' title in Formula One.

The 2015 race was held on 11 October 2015. The weekend saw a massive crash for Toro Rosso driver Carlos Sainz Jr. in the third free practice session, after he lost control of his car at turn 13, hit a wall, and went into the Tecpro barriers. He was declared fit to start the race. Nico Rosberg took pole position but he was forced to retire in the early stages due to a faulty throttle. His teammate Lewis Hamilton took the win, ahead of Ferrari's Sebastian Vettel, and Force India's Sergio Pérez, who had initially lost third position on the final lap, but retook it after Kimi Räikkönen and Valtteri Bottas collided while battling each other for third, with Bottas retiring on the spot and Räikkönen receiving a 30-second post race penalty for the collision. Mercedes also secured their second consecutive constructor's championship, having done so at the previous year's event.

The 2016 event was held on 1 May 2016, moved forward to the fourth round of the calendar, unlike the previous two events. The race saw a big crash at the start at turn 2 that saw Nico Hülkenberg, Esteban Gutiérrez, and Rio Haryanto all eliminated. Sebastian Vettel was hit in the rear by Daniil Kvyat going into turn 2, then he was hit again at turn 3, causing him to spin and crash out of the race. On the Thursday after the event, Red Bull announced that they demoted Kvyat back to Toro Rosso for the rest of the season, switching places with 18-year-old Dutchman Max Verstappen. Nico Rosberg was the winner, with Lewis Hamilton making it a one-two finish for Mercedes.

The 2017 event was held on 30 April 2017, and saw Valtteri Bottas secure his first career win in Formula One, ahead of the Ferrari pair of Sebastian Vettel and Kimi Räikkonen. Vettel and Räikkönen locked out the front row but both were passed by Bottas on the run to turn 2. Fernando Alonso was unable to start due to a problem with his power unit, and both Romain Grosjean and Jolyon Palmer were eliminated in a crash that saw the Renault driver launch the Haas driver into the air and into the barrier. Both drivers escaped unhurt. Bottas took the win by just 0.7 seconds from Vettel in the end, with Räikkönen setting the fastest lap.

The 2018 race was held on 30 September 2018, having moved from its April slot to fill a vacancy left by the 2017 discontinuation of the Malaysian Grand Prix. The event saw Valtteri Bottas take pole position one year after securing his first ever victory at the circuit.

In the 2019 Russian Grand Prix, Charles Leclerc was on pole ahead of Lewis Hamilton and Sebastian Vettel, but Vettel jumped them both going into Turn 2, and led the race until lap 26, when he suffered a MGU-K failure. A lap later, George Russell crashed into the barriers at Turn 9, apparently from a wheel nut failure, according to the Williams team. This prompted Robert Kubica to retire so the team could conserve parts. After the safety car, Leclerc tried an unsuccessful overtaking manoeuvre on Valtteri Bottas, and Lewis Hamilton took another victory, with Bottas and Leclerc second and third respectively.

=== Contract termination and abandoned switch to Igora Drive ===
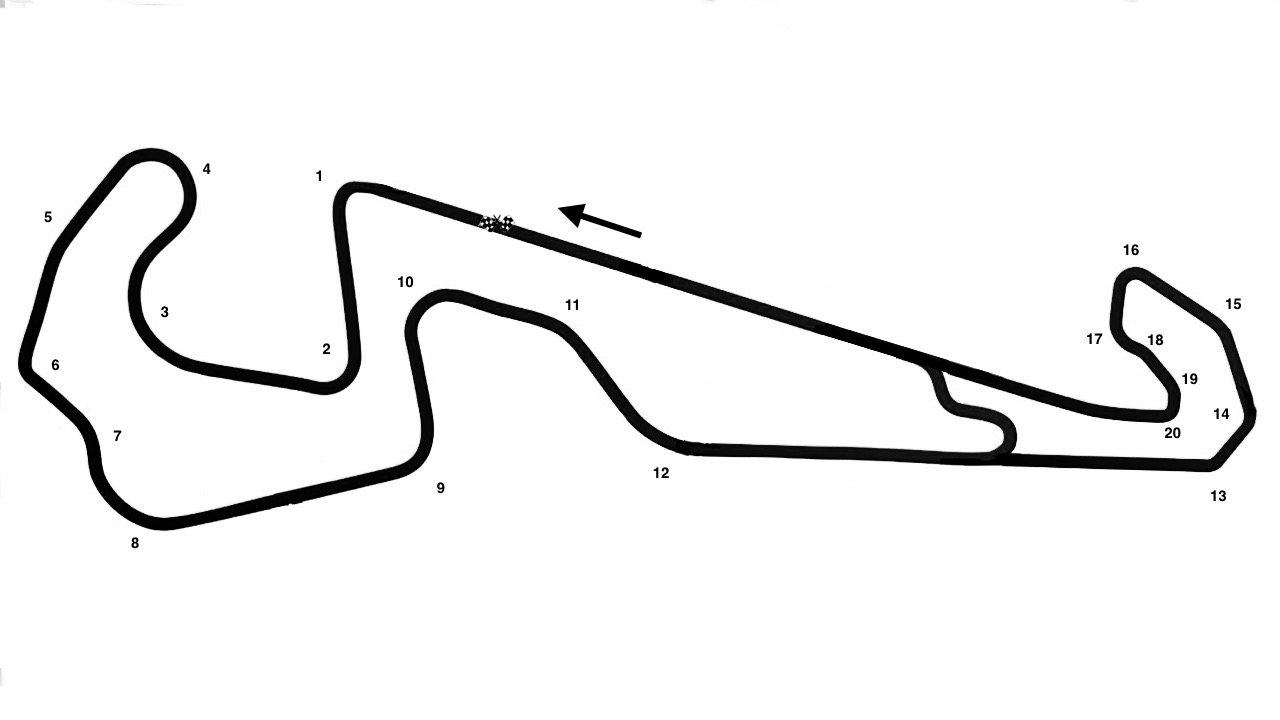
Grand Prix layout map of Igora Drive, which was supposed to host the Grand Prix from 2023

On 24 February 2022, following the Russian invasion of Ukraine, Formula One suspended the contract for the Grand Prix, stating that it would be "impossible to hold it under the current circumstances." World Champions Sebastian Vettel and Max Verstappen had previously called for the cancellation of the race. The race was eventually cancelled on 1 March 2022.

The race was due to move north from Sochi Autodrom to Igora Drive near Saint Petersburg from 2023 onwards. However, on 3 March 2022, in the wake of the continuing Russian invasion of Ukraine, Formula One announced that the contract to hold the Russian Grand Prix had been terminated.

== Winners ==
=== By year ===
A pink background indicates an event which was not part of the Formula One World Championship.

Year	Driver	Constructor	Location	Report
1913	(Russia) Georgy Suvorin	Benz	Saint Petersburg	Report
1914	(Germany) Willy Scholl	Benz	Saint Petersburg	Report
1915 – 2013	Not held			
2014	(United Kingdom) Lewis Hamilton	Mercedes	Sochi	Report
2015	(United Kingdom) Lewis Hamilton	Mercedes	Sochi	Report
2016	(Germany) Nico Rosberg	Mercedes	Sochi	Report
2017	(Finland) Valtteri Bottas	Mercedes	Sochi	Report
2018	(United Kingdom) Lewis Hamilton	Mercedes	Sochi	Report
2019	(United Kingdom) Lewis Hamilton	Mercedes	Sochi	Report
2020	(Finland) Valtteri Bottas	Mercedes	Sochi	Report
2021	(United Kingdom) Lewis Hamilton	Mercedes	Sochi	Report

=== Repeat winners (drivers) ===
Drivers in bold are competing in the Formula One championship in 2026.

Wins	Driver	Years won
5	(United Kingdom) **Lewis Hamilton**	2014, 2015, 2018, 2019, 2021
2	**(Finland) Valtteri Bottas**	2017, 2020

=== Repeat winners (constructors) ===
Teams in bold are competing in the Formula One championship in 2026.
A pink background indicates an event which was not part of the Formula One World Championship.

Wins	Constructor	Years won
8	(Germany) **Mercedes**	2014, 2015, 2016, 2017, 2018, 2019, 2020, 2021
2	(Germany) Benz	1913, 1914

=== Repeat winners (engine manufacturers) ===
Manufacturers in bold are competing in the Formula One championship in 2026.
A pink background indicates an event which was not part of the Formula One World Championship.

Wins	Manufacturer	Years won
8	(Germany) **Mercedes**	2014, 2015, 2016, 2017, 2018, 2019, 2020, 2021
2	(Germany) Benz	1913, 1914
