= 2016 Russian Grand Prix =

Race 4 of 21 in the 2016 Formula One World Championship
← Previous race	Next race →
- Layout of the Sochi Autodrom

Race details
- Date: 1 May 2016
- Official name: 2016 Formula 1 Russian Grand Prix
- Location: Sochi Autodrom, Adlersky City District, Sochi, Krasnodar Krai, Russia
- Course: Permanent racing facility
- Course length: 5.848 km (3.634 miles)
- Distance: 53 laps, 309.745 km (192.467 miles)
- Weather: Partly cloudy 16 °C (61 °F) air temperature 37–41 °C (99–106 °F) track temperature 2.5 m/s (8.2 ft/s) wind from the southwest
- Attendance: 158,000 (Weekend)

Pole position
Driver	(Germany) Nico Rosberg	Mercedes
- Time: 1:35.417

Fastest lap
Driver	(Germany) Nico Rosberg	Mercedes
- Time: 1:39.094 on lap 52

Podium
First	(Germany) Nico Rosberg	Mercedes
Second	(United Kingdom) Lewis Hamilton	Mercedes
Third	(Finland) Kimi Räikkönen	Ferrari

The 2016 Russian Grand Prix (formally known as the 2016 Formula 1 Russian Grand Prix; Russian: Гран-при России 2016 года, romanized: Gran-pri Rossii 2016 goda) was a Formula One motor race that took place on 1 May 2016. The race, contested over fifty-three laps, was held at the Sochi Autodrom. It was the fourth round of the 2016 FIA Formula One World Championship and marked the fifth running of the Russian Grand Prix, the third time as a round of the Formula One World Championship since the series inception in 1950. Nico Rosberg of Mercedes came into the race leading the championship ahead of his teammate Lewis Hamilton, who was the defending race winner.

Nico Rosberg won the race from pole position, ahead of his teammate Lewis Hamilton, with Kimi Räikkönen completing the podium for Ferrari. While Rosberg extended his winning streak to seven consecutive Grands Prix, Sebastian Vettel retired from the race on the first lap, after contact with Red Bull's Daniil Kvyat. With the maximum number of 100 points from the first four races of the season, Rosberg left Russia with a 43-point lead to Hamilton. By securing pole position, winning the race, setting the fastest lap and leading every lap, Nico Rosberg achieved the first grand slam of his career.

== Report ==
=== Background ===
Going into the fourth Grand Prix weekend of the season, Nico Rosberg and his team Mercedes were leading the Drivers' and Constructors' championships respectively. Rosberg was 36 points ahead of his teammate Lewis Hamilton, having taken 75 out of 75 available points from the first three races of the season. Daniel Ricciardo followed in third place, three points behind Hamilton. In the Constructors' standings, Mercedes headed the field with 114 points, 53 points ahead of Ferrari and 57 points clear of Red Bull. This was the third time since the Russian Grand Prix debuted in Formula One in 2014 that the race was held as part of the World Championship. Two early editions of the race were held in 1913 and 1914.

Red Bull Racing used the first practice session to test the "aeroscreen", a form of cockpit protection developed in response to fatal accidents of the drivers such as Ayrton Senna, Jules Bianchi, Justin Wilson and Henry Surtees, who were struck on the head by flying debris. The aeroscreen was developed as an alternative to the "halo" device trialled by Ferrari during pre-season testing. The device was fitted to Daniel Ricciardo's car and he completed a single installation lap to assess it before it was removed for the remainder of the session. Ricciardo was satisfied with the device, saying: "Where we have the structure in place is pretty much where the mirrors are so I wouldn't say it hindered any more than we are now in terms of visibility. Peripheral vision was fine as well."

Sole tyre supplier Pirelli brought the medium, soft and supersoft tyres to the event, continuing the trend established in the Australian, Bahrain and Chinese Grands Prix. Per the regulations of the 2016 season, every driver needs to set aside one set each of the two hardest compounds for the race and one set of the supersoft tyres for Q3 (should they advance). The drivers have freedom of what other compounds they choose for the remaining ten out of thirteen sets. It was the 100th race for Pirelli tyres since their return to the sport in 2011.

=== Free practice ===
Per the regulations for the 2016 season, two ninety-minute practice sessions were held on Friday and another one-hour session was held before qualifying on Saturday. In the first session on Friday morning, Nico Rosberg was fastest for Mercedes with a time of 1:38.127, more than seven-tenths of a second ahead of his teammate Lewis Hamilton. Both set their fastest times on the super-soft tyre compound, while Sebastian Vettel and Kimi Räikkönen at Ferrari opted for the harder soft compound, slotting in third and fourth fastest respectively. Several drivers had problems with spinning or running wide, either in turn two or between turns 15 and 16. Among the drivers caught out were Hamilton, Vettel, Jolyon Palmer and Jenson Button. Two reserve drivers made an appearance during the first free practice session. Sergey Sirotkin drove for Renault, taking the place of Kevin Magnussen, making his second appearance in a Formula One car, after driving for Sauber during free practice at the 2014 Russian Grand Prix. Alfonso Celis Jr. replaced Nico Hülkenberg at Force India during the first practice session. Sirotkin ended the session ahead of his teammate Palmer, while Celis finished last, more than three seconds behind teammate Sergio Pérez.

Lewis Hamilton topped the timesheets in second practice on Friday afternoon with a time of 1:37.583, using the super-soft compound. Earlier in the session, he had suffered a spin in turn four that flat-spotted his tyres and sent him back to the pitlane. Rosberg managed only third fastest as the Mercedes drivers were split by Sebastian Vettel, even though the latter suffered from electrical problems that lost him track time. Rosberg in turn was unable to improve on his time set on the soft-compound tyre due to his super-soft run being compromised by yellow flags shown after a spin by Romain Grosjean. Behind the top three, Kimi Räikkönen was again fourth, ahead of Daniel Ricciardo and Valtteri Bottas. Slowest of the session was Sauber's Marcus Ericsson, with the two Manor drivers Rio Haryanto and Pascal Wehrlein slotting in ahead of him. Wehrlein reported a loss of power after crossing the chequered flag at the end of the session.

In third practice on Saturday morning, Hamilton narrowly beat Rosberg to the fastest time, lapping just 0.068 seconds faster than his teammate. All drivers used the super-soft tyre compound to set their fastest lap times, with the two Ferrari cars of Vettel and Räikkönen third and fourth ahead of the Williams pair of Felipe Massa and Valtteri Bottas. Vettel had spent most of the session testing his car with a heavier fuel load in preparation for the race that would see him start with a five-place grid penalty for a change of the gearbox. He completed the highest number of laps with 28, ahead of Daniel Ricciardo, who was 11th fastest. At the back end, the Sauber drivers of Ericsson and Nasr were slowest, behind both Manor cars.

=== Qualifying ===
Qualifying consisted of three parts, 18, 15 and 12 minutes in length respectively, with six drivers eliminated from competing after each of the first two sessions. During the first part of qualifying (Q1), Lewis Hamilton set the fastest time, a new fastest lap of the track ever at 1:36.006. However, he also came under investigation of the stewards as he failed to obliged the rules set for turn 2, rejoining the track earlier than allowed after running wide. After being summoned to the stewards at the end of qualifying, he walked away with a reprimand, but was not penalised. Behind Rosberg in second place, the two Ferrari cars of Sebastian Vettel and Kimi Räikkönen were third and fourth respectively. At the tail end of the field, three pairs of cars were eliminated: both Sauber, Manor and Renault drivers missed Q2.

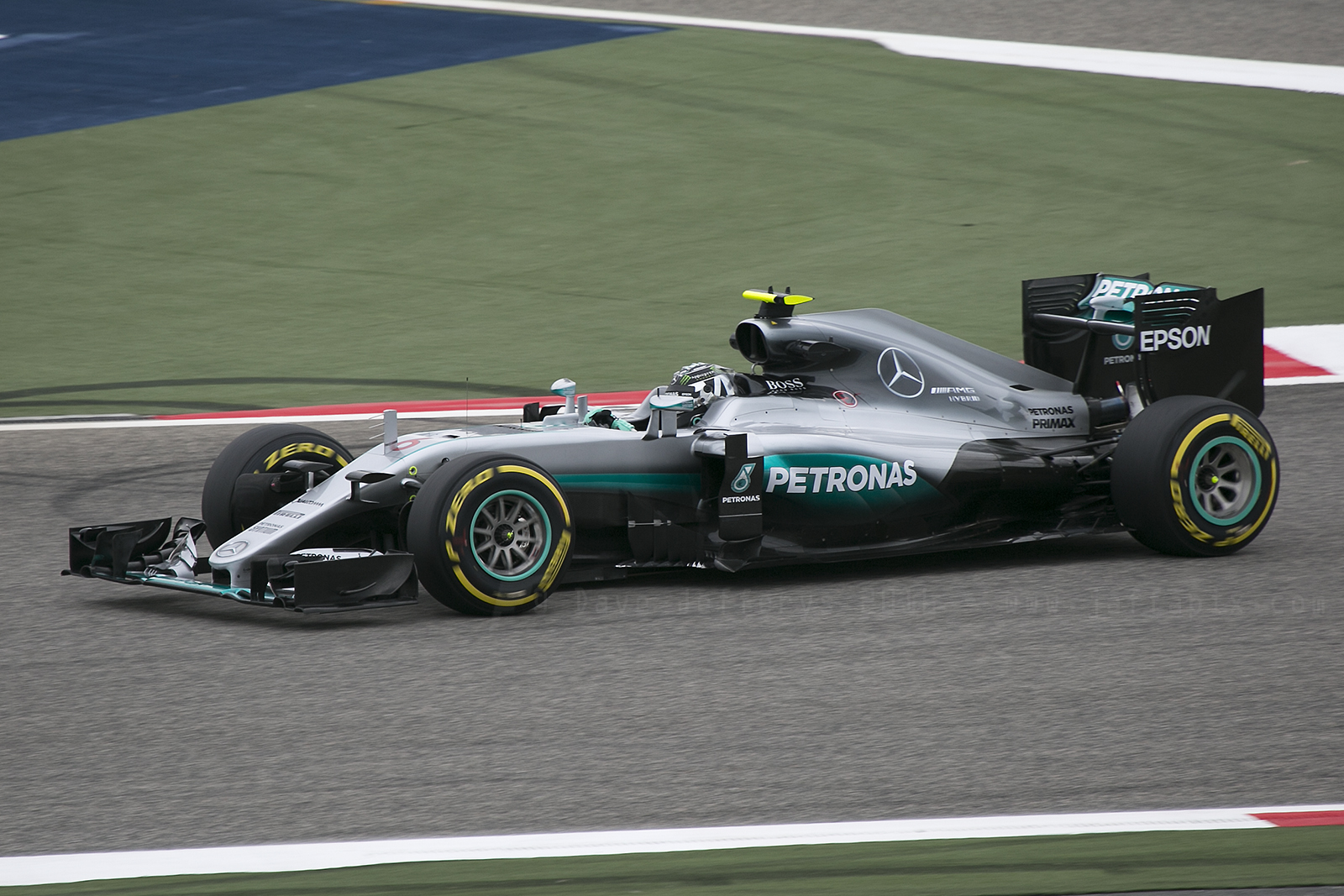
Nico Rosberg (pictured at the Bahrain Grand Prix) qualified on pole position.

In the second part, Nico Rosberg was fastest, half a second faster than teammate Hamilton, and 1.7 seconds clear of the pole position lap time from the year before. Both McLarens had shown promising pace, but nevertheless dropped out of contention in 12th and 14th, while Daniil Kvyat was the last driver to secure a place in Q3, demoting Carlos Sainz Jr. to 11th. Kvyat's Red Bull teammate Daniel Ricciardo also progressed, albeit suffering a failure of his wing mirror, which hung off the side of his vehicle during his last timed lap. Eliminated at the back were both Haas drivers, along Nico Hülkenberg, who was unable to follow his teammate Pérez into Q3 and qualified 13th.

As Q3 started, it became apparent that Lewis Hamilton would be unable to take part, suffering from a hybrid system failure in the turbo charger, the same problem that had plagued him in China two weeks earlier. Nico Rosberg went on to secure pole position, even though his last timed lap was compromised by a tyre lockup into turn 13. Sebastian Vettel was closest to Rosberg, but a five-place grid penalty meant that he would start the race from seventh on the grid, moving Valtteri Bottas into the first row. Kimi Räikkönen was fourth fastest, ahead of Massa, Ricciardo, Pérez, Kvyat and Verstappen. After qualifying, Mercedes decided to switch Hamilton's car back to his spare power unit, which had been rebuilt following its failure at the Chinese Grand Prix, thereby avoiding a grid penalty, which they would have incurred if a new power unit would have been installed. Williams were satisfied with their pace in qualifying, praising the advances they made in slow-corner speed.

=== Race ===
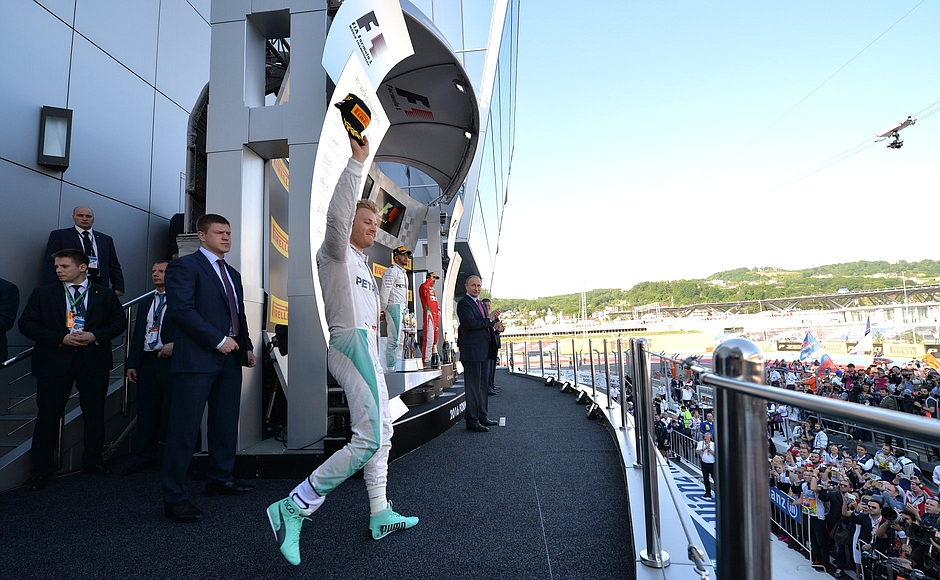
Nico Rosberg on his way to the winner's podium

At the start, several drivers made contact with one another into turn two. Sebastian Vettel was hit in the rear by Daniil Kvyat there and during turn three, the latter of which caused him to crash into the barrier and retire from the competition. Further back, Nico Hülkenberg was hit by Esteban Gutiérrez and collected Rio Haryanto, forcing both Hülkenberg and Haryanto into retirement as well. As the safety car came out to allow for the cars and debris to be cleared from the track, several cars headed to the pit lane to repair damage, among them Daniel Ricciardo, Daniil Kvyat and Sergio Pérez. The order at the restart on lap four was: Rosberg, Räikkönen, Bottas, Massa and Hamilton, who had stayed clear of the incidents to move up to fifth. On the restart, Bottas moved ahead of Räikkönen, while Hamilton made a successful move on Massa into fourth. Kvyat's early pit stop left him in 15th at that point, and he soon served a ten-second stop-and-go penalty for his contacts with Vettel, dropping him to last. Meanwhile, Hamilton overtook Räikkönen to move into third on lap seven. Felipe Nasr came into the pit lane on lap 12 to replace a slow puncture on his tyres. The order at the front remained the same until Bottas became the first front runner to pit for fresh tyres on lap 17. Hamilton followed suit one lap later, but still emerged behind Bottas, overtaking him into turn two another lap later. On lap 20, Räikkönen made a pit stop as well, coming back out behind Hamilton, but ahead of Bottas. All the while, Rosberg led comfortably ahead of Max Verstappen, who made his first stop on lap 23 and dropped back.

While racing for position on lap 23, Sainz forced Jolyon Palmer off the track in turn two and was later handed a ten-second time penalty for the incident. Four laps later, Pascal Wehrlein tried to overtake Felipe Nasr for 16th, but was unsuccessful and in turn lost a position to Kvyat. His teammate Ricciardo overtook Kevin Magnussen for eighth on lap 29, but lost the position again and was in turn passed by Romain Grosjean. As Nico Rosberg started to lap backmarkers on lap 31, the gap to second-placed Hamilton started to come down, with his advantage dropping from more than eleven seconds to a little more than seven seconds by lap 36. Meanwhile, Verstappen was forced to retire due to power unit failure on lap 34, while running in sixth place. As Hamilton was told by his pit crew that he suffered from a water pressure problem, his gap to Rosberg started to increase again, staying at 13 seconds by lap 41. Wehrlein made a pit stop for new tyres on the same lap, but problems with his stop forced him stationary for almost a minute, resulting in him moving into last place on the road.

On lap 47, Massa made a pit stop for new tyres from fifth place, retaining his position ahead of Fernando Alonso. All the while, Räikkönen was able to close the gap to Hamilton ahead of him to eight seconds on lap 49. On the next lap, Button passed Sainz for tenth and Ricciardo moved ahead of Palmer for 12th another lap later. Rosberg crossed the line to take his seventh consecutive victory, a feat to that point only achieved by Alberto Ascari, Michael Schumacher and Sebastian Vettel. Lewis Hamilton and Kimi Räikkönen rounded up the podium ahead of the two Williams drivers, Valtteri Bottas and Felipe Massa. Rosberg recorded the first Grand Slam of his career, meaning he won the race, recorded the fastest lap, achieved pole position and led every lap. He was the 24th driver in history to achieve the feat.

=== Post-race ===
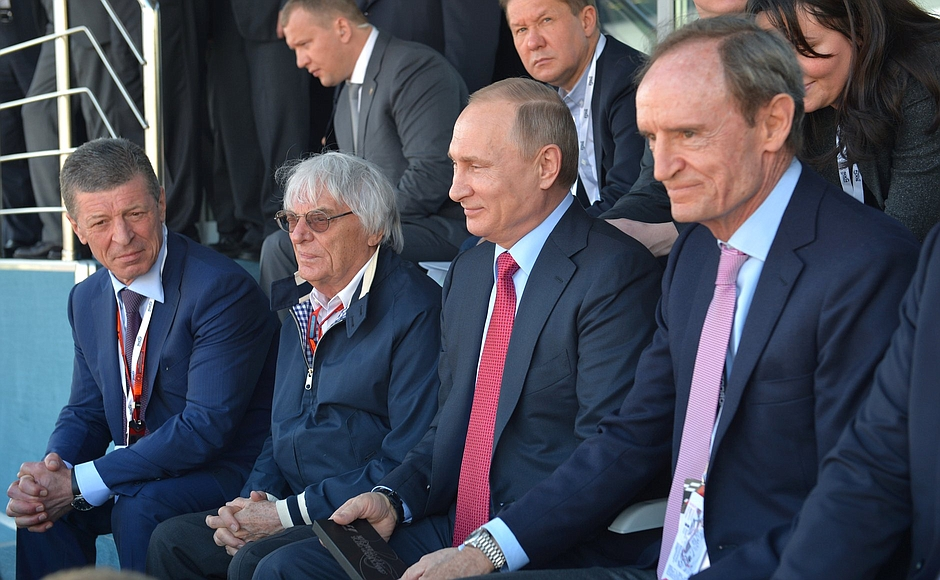
Bernie Ecclestone (second from the left) and Vladimir Putin (second from the right) in the grandstands during the race

The first lap collision between Kvyat and Vettel that put the latter out of the race was a major talking point afterwards. The two had already been embroiled in an argument after the previous Grand Prix in China, when Vettel felt that Kvyat had caused a collision between the two Ferrari drivers. This time around, Vettel reacted to his retirement with what The Telegraph described as "one of the most explosive outbursts heard over team radio for years". He later demanded an apology from Kvyat, as did Red Bull teammate Ricciardo, who felt that Kvyat, who pushed Vettel into him, had ruined his race as well. Red Bull announced that they would summon Kvyat to talks about the incident, calling their race a "disaster", with Helmut Marko, the team's young driver coordinator, calling him "over-motivated". Kvyat received three penalty points on his licence as a result of the incident. He himself said after the race: "I apologise to everyone who is involved and I will learn from it. I think we have to speak. It is easy now to attack me and I guess everyone will, but I am OK with that."

On 5 May, Red Bull announced that they had relegated Kvyat back to their junior squad, Toro Rosso, the team for which he made his début in 2014, for the remainder of the season, switching him with 18-year-old Max Verstappen. Red Bull's team principal Christian Horner explained the driver swap with Verstappen's talent, also stressing that the move to Red Bull would tie him to the team for the foreseeable future.

Following multiple collisions shortly after the start, Jenson Button pressed for changes to be made to turn two of the Sochi Autodrom, saying: "The bollard at turn two is the problem at the start because people are trying to fight through turns two and three. I think that needs some looking at." Apart from Kvyat, two more drivers received penalty points to their licences. Two points each were given to Carlos Sainz Jr., who was deemed to have forced Jolyon Palmer off the track and Esteban Gutiérrez, who collided with Nico Hülkenberg at the start.

As a result of the race, Nico Rosberg cemented his position at the top of the Drivers' Championship, having taken the maximum number of 100 points available from the first four rounds. Lewis Hamilton followed in second with 57 points, while Kimi Räikkönen moved up to third with 43 points. Vettel's retirement dropped him to fifth in the standings, behind Daniel Ricciardo. In the Constructors' standings, Mercedes increased their points tally to 157, now 81 points clear of second-placed Ferrari. Red Bull's poor performance saw their advantage over fourth placed Williams reduced to just six points.

== Classification ==
=== Qualifying ===
Pos.	Car no.	Driver	Constructor	Qualifying times			Final grid
Pos.	Car no.	Driver	Constructor	Q1	Q2	Q3	Final grid
1	6	(Germany) Nico Rosberg	Mercedes	1:36.119	1:35.337	1:35.417	1
2	5	(Germany) Sebastian Vettel	Ferrari	1:36.555	1:36.623	1:36.123	7^{1}
3	77	(Finland) Valtteri Bottas	Williams-Mercedes	1:37.746	1:37.140	1:36.536	2
4	7	(Finland) Kimi Räikkönen	Ferrari	1:36.976	1:36.741	1:36.663	3
5	19	(Brazil) Felipe Massa	Williams-Mercedes	1:37.753	1:37.230	1:37.016	4
6	3	(Australia) Daniel Ricciardo	Red Bull Racing-TAG Heuer	1:38.091	1:37.569	1:37.125	5
7	11	(Mexico) Sergio Pérez	Force India-Mercedes	1:38.006	1:37.282	1:37.212	6
8	26	(Russia) Daniil Kvyat	Red Bull Racing-TAG Heuer	1:38.265	1:37.606	1:37.459	8
9	33	(Netherlands) Max Verstappen	Toro Rosso-Ferrari	1:38.123	1:37.510	1:37.583	9
10	44	(United Kingdom) Lewis Hamilton	Mercedes	1:36.006	1:35.820	No time	10
11	55	(Spain) Carlos Sainz Jr.	Toro Rosso-Ferrari	1:37.784	1:37.652	N/A	11
12	22	(United Kingdom) Jenson Button	McLaren-Honda	1:38.332	1:37.701	N/A	12
13	27	(Germany) Nico Hülkenberg	Force India-Mercedes	1:38.562	1:37.771	N/A	13
14	14	(Spain) Fernando Alonso	McLaren-Honda	1:37.971	1:37.807	N/A	14
15	8	(France) Romain Grosjean	Haas-Ferrari	1:38.383	1:38.055	N/A	15
16	21	(Mexico) Esteban Gutiérrez	Haas-Ferrari	1:38.678	1:38.115	N/A	16
17	20	(Denmark) Kevin Magnussen	Renault	1:38.914	N/A	N/A	17
18	30	(United Kingdom) Jolyon Palmer	Renault	1:39.009	N/A	N/A	18
19	12	(Brazil) Felipe Nasr	Sauber-Ferrari	1:39.018	N/A	N/A	19
20	94	(Germany) Pascal Wehrlein	MRT-Mercedes	1:39.399	N/A	N/A	20
21	88	(Indonesia) Rio Haryanto	MRT-Mercedes	1:39.463	N/A	N/A	21
22	9	(Sweden) Marcus Ericsson	Sauber-Ferrari	1:39.519	N/A	N/A	22
107% time: 1:42.726

Notes

- ^1 – Sebastian Vettel received a five place grid penalty for an unscheduled gearbox change.

=== Race ===
Pos.	No.	Driver	Constructor	Laps	Time/Retired	Grid	Pts.
1	6	(Germany) Nico Rosberg	Mercedes	53	1:32:41.997	1	25
2	44	(United Kingdom) Lewis Hamilton	Mercedes	53	+25.022	10	18
3	7	(Finland) Kimi Räikkönen	Ferrari	53	+31.998	3	15
4	77	(Finland) Valtteri Bottas	Williams-Mercedes	53	+50.217	2	12
5	19	(Brazil) Felipe Massa	Williams-Mercedes	53	+1:14.527	4	10
6	14	(Spain) Fernando Alonso	McLaren-Honda	52	+1 Lap	14	8
7	20	(Denmark) Kevin Magnussen	Renault	52	+1 Lap	17	6
8	8	(France) Romain Grosjean	Haas-Ferrari	52	+1 Lap	15	4
9	11	(Mexico) Sergio Pérez	Force India-Mercedes	52	+1 Lap	6	2
10	22	(United Kingdom) Jenson Button	McLaren-Honda	52	+1 Lap	12	1
11	3	(Australia) Daniel Ricciardo	Red Bull Racing-TAG Heuer	52	+1 Lap	5	
12	55	(Spain) Carlos Sainz Jr.	Toro Rosso-Ferrari	52	+1 Lap	11	
13	30	(United Kingdom) Jolyon Palmer	Renault	52	+1 Lap	18	
14	9	(Sweden) Marcus Ericsson	Sauber-Ferrari	52	+1 Lap	22	
15	26	(Russia) Daniil Kvyat	Red Bull Racing-TAG Heuer	52	+1 Lap	8	
16	12	(Brazil) Felipe Nasr	Sauber-Ferrari	52	+1 Lap	19	
17	21	(Mexico) Esteban Gutiérrez	Haas-Ferrari	52	+1 Lap	16	
18	94	(Germany) Pascal Wehrlein	MRT-Mercedes	51	+2 Laps	20	
Ret	33	(Netherlands) Max Verstappen	Toro Rosso-Ferrari	33	Power unit	9	
Ret	5	(Germany) Sebastian Vettel	Ferrari	0	Collision	7	
Ret	27	(Germany) Nico Hülkenberg	Force India-Mercedes	0	Collision	13	
Ret	88	(Indonesia) Rio Haryanto	MRT-Mercedes	0	Collision	21	

== Championship standings after the race ==
Drivers' Championship standings

	Pos.	Driver	Points
	1	(Germany) Nico Rosberg	100
	2	(United Kingdom) Lewis Hamilton	57
2	3	(Finland) Kimi Räikkönen	43
1	4	(Australia) Daniel Ricciardo	36
1	5	(Germany) Sebastian Vettel	33

Constructors' Championship standings

Pos.	Constructor	Points
1	(Germany) Mercedes	157
2	(Italy) Ferrari	76
3	(Austria) Red Bull Racing-TAG Heuer	57
4	(United Kingdom) Williams-Mercedes	51
5	(United States) Haas-Ferrari	22
Sources:

- Note: Only the top five positions are included for both sets of standings.

Previous race: 2016 Chinese Grand Prix	FIA Formula One World Championship; 2016 season	Next race: 2016 Spanish Grand Prix
Previous race: 2015 Russian Grand Prix	Russian Grand Prix	Next race: 2017 Russian Grand Prix
