= 2015 Russian Grand Prix =

15th round of the 2015 Formula One season

Race 15 of 19 in the 2015 Formula One World Championship
← Previous race	Next race →
- Layout of the Sochi Autodrom

Race details
- Date: 11 October 2015
- Official name: 2015 Formula 1 Russian Grand Prix
- Location: Sochi Autodrom, Adlersky City District, Sochi, Krasnodar Krai, Russia
- Course: Temporary street circuit
- Course length: 5.848 km (3.634 miles)
- Distance: 53 laps, 309.745 km (192.467 miles)
- Weather: Partly cloudy 18 °C (64 °F) air temperature 25–27 °C (77–81 °F) track temperature 1.5 m/s (4.9 ft/s) wind from the north
- Attendance: 149,000 (Weekend) 62,000 (Race Day)

Pole position
Driver	(Germany) Nico Rosberg	Mercedes
- Time: 1:37.113

Fastest lap
Driver	(Germany) Sebastian Vettel	Ferrari
- Time: 1:40.071 on lap 51

Podium
First	(United Kingdom) Lewis Hamilton	Mercedes
Second	(Germany) Sebastian Vettel	Ferrari
Third	(Mexico) Sergio Pérez	Force India-Mercedes

The 2015 Russian Grand Prix (formally known as the 2015 Formula 1 Russian Grand Prix; Russian: Гран-при России 2015 года, romanized: Gran-pri Rossii 2015 goda) was a Formula One motor race that took place on 11 October 2015. The fifty-three lap race was held at the Sochi Autodrom. This was the fifteenth round of the 2015 season and marked the second time that the Russian Grand Prix was run as a round of the Formula One World Championship since its inception in 1950.

Lewis Hamilton won the race for the second season in a row, extending his Drivers' Championship lead to 66 points. With Nico Rosberg retiring early in the race, Sebastian Vettel reclaimed second place in the standings for the first time since his round two victory in Malaysia with a second-place finish. Sergio Pérez completed the podium in third for Force India.

Mercedes secured their second consecutive Constructors' Championship, having done so at the same event the previous season.

== Report ==
=== Background ===
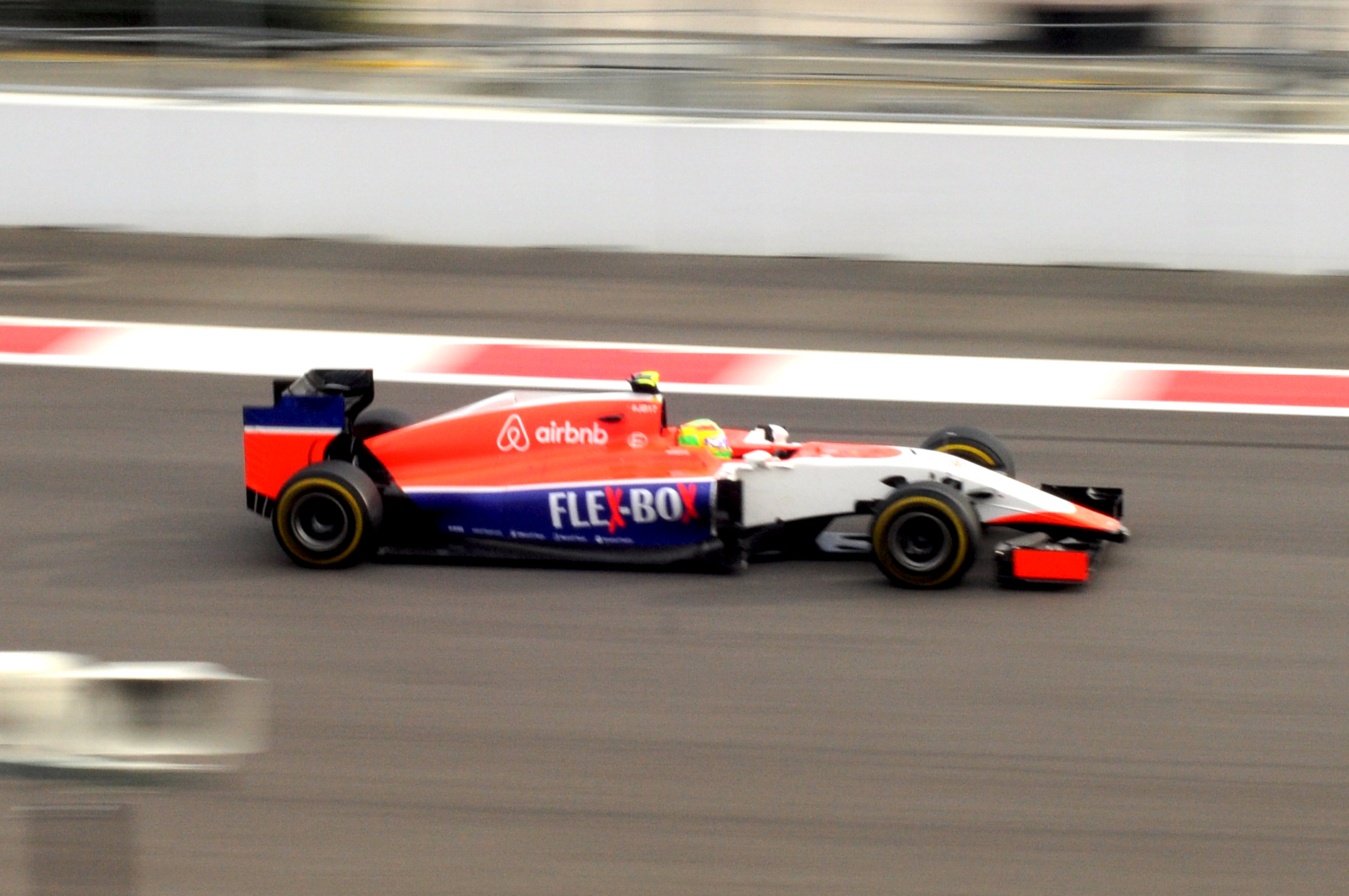
Roberto Merhi returned to Marussia for the race.

After the previous year's race showed lower-than-expected tyre degradation, Pirelli opted to supply the yellow-banded soft compound as the prime selection and the red-banded supersoft tyre as the option selection. The previous season's event saw Nico Rosberg complete 52 of 53 laps on the white-banded medium compound on his way to a second-place finish. Even with the softer tyre choice, tyre degradation was not an issue at the event, with drivers able to record fast lap times all through the race on a one-stop strategy.

Roberto Merhi replaced Alexander Rossi for Marussia, in accordance with Rossi's five-race contract that saw him sit out this race and the Abu Dhabi Grand Prix. Jolyon Palmer replaced Romain Grosjean for Lotus for Friday's first free practice session for the tenth time this season.

Fernando Alonso began the weekend's event knowing he would start from the back of the grid due to a number of penalties incurred for changing engine parts. Honda provided him with an upgraded internal combustion engine, which had been designed using the team's last four in-season development tokens. Alonso's McLaren teammate Jenson Button had to continue using the old-specification engine at this race as Honda only had one of the upgraded power units available. However, Alonso used the new power unit only in the first practice session before switching back to the older unit, albeit voicing satisfaction with the performance of the new specification.

Going into the weekend, Lewis Hamilton led the Drivers' Championship with a 48-point advantage over teammate Rosberg, with Sebastian Vettel another eleven points behind in third. Mercedes led the Constructors' Standings on 506 points, 169 points ahead of Ferrari. In third was Williams, another 129 points behind.

=== Free practice ===
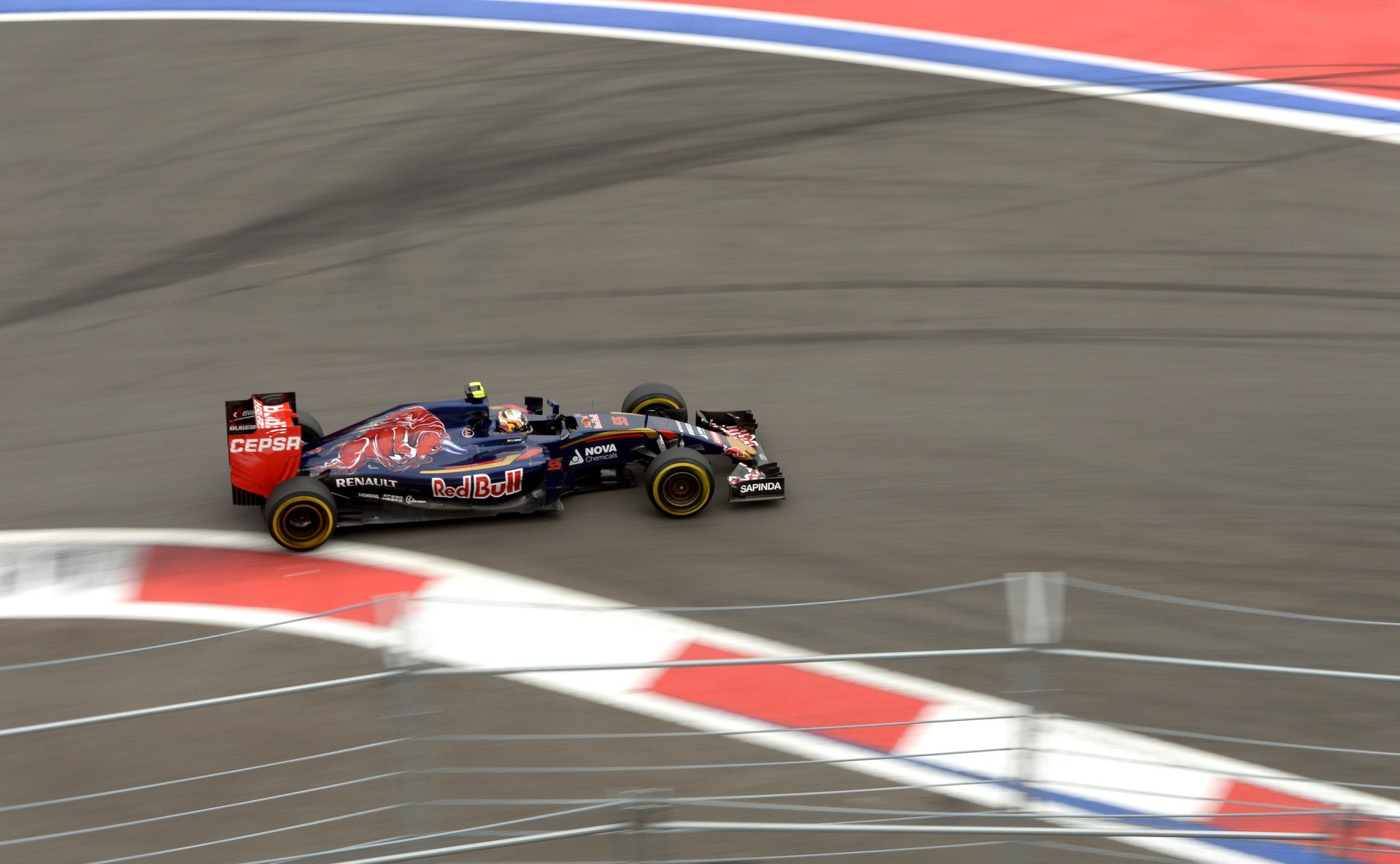
Carlos Sainz Jr. had a bad accident in the third practice session.

Per the regulations for the 2015 season, three practice sessions were held, two 90-minute sessions on Friday and another one-hour session before qualifying on Saturday. However, all three sessions were disrupted and little running took place. During the first session on Friday morning, a spillage of diesel on track prevented the cars from going out on until very late in the session. Eventually, Nico Hülkenberg topped the session for Force India, ahead of his compatriots Nico Rosberg and Sebastian Vettel. Since water was used to clear the surface, the first laps were run on intermediate tyres by most drivers, with both Williams cars being equipped with full wet tyres, but Valtteri Bottas spun on them entering the pit lane. Later, the track dried enough to use slick tyres, Fernando Alonso being the first to do so. Due to the limited running, the last minutes were busy with most cars out on track. Marcus Ericsson however was confined to the sidelines as he stopped with an engine problem. As Lewis Hamilton spun on his last timed lap, he needed to settle for seventh fastest.

With a lot of rain falling, the second practice session saw only eight drivers set timed laps, with just 14 taking to the track. Felipe Massa set the fastest time with a lap of 2:00.458. Both Lotus and Marussia did not run at all, while Fernando Alonso ran the most number of laps with twelve, following an engine change.

The third practice session on Saturday saw limited running as well, as training was halted due to a massive 46g crash by Carlos Sainz Jr. The Spaniard lost control of his car going into turn 13, hit a wall and went on to crash into the safety barriers, burying the nose of his car in the process. The session was stopped while Sainz was taken out of the car and transported to hospital, albeit uninjured. The guardrail behind the safety barriers collapsed as a result of the impact. Practice was not resumed afterwards and the time of 1:38.561 set by Nico Rosberg before the accident remained the fastest lap of the session. He was more than seven-tenths of a second faster than Valtteri Bottas in second, with Lewis Hamilton another tenth behind. Sainz's teammate Max Verstappen finished the session 17th fastest after spinning in the final corner.

=== Qualifying ===
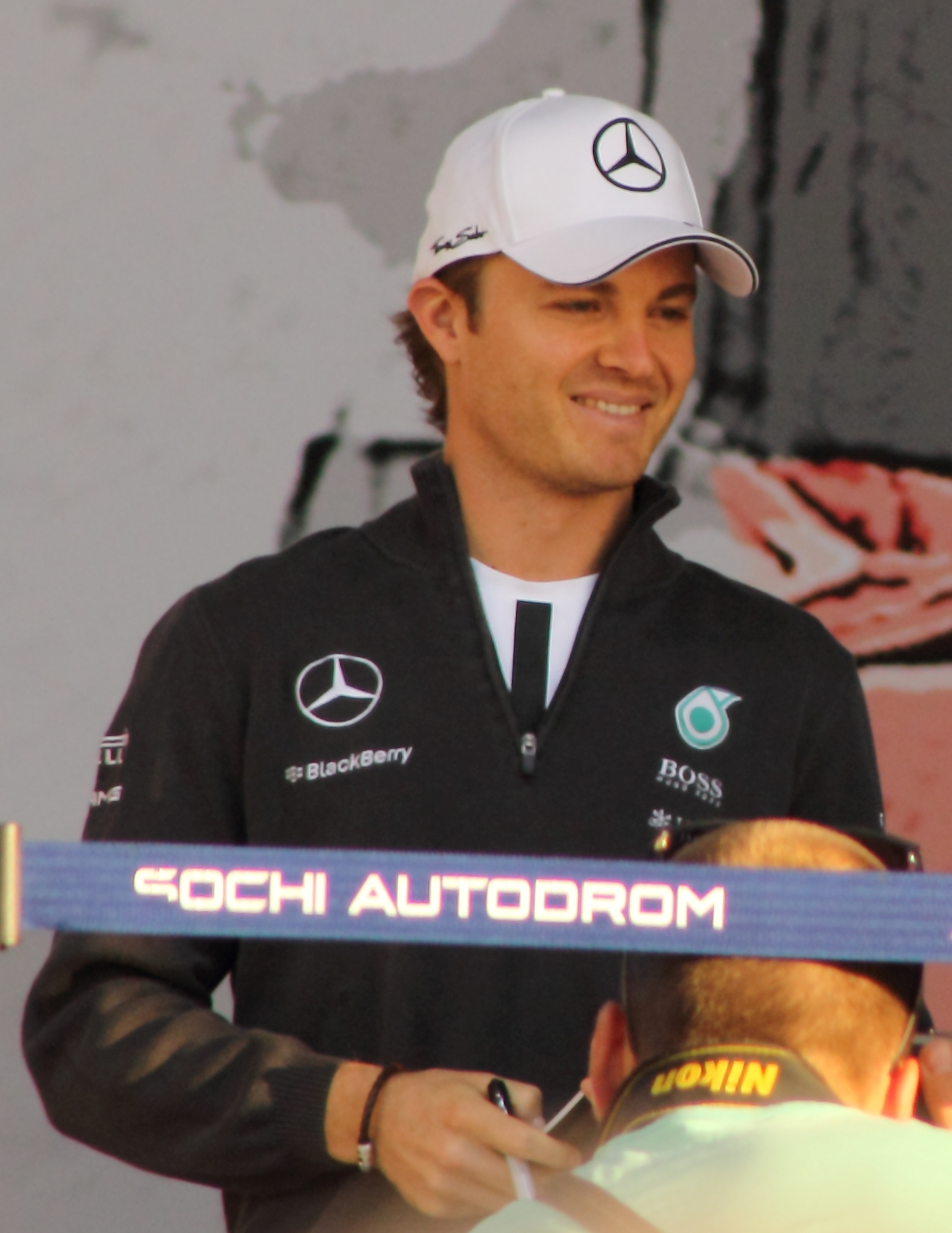
Nico Rosberg claimed pole position, but later retired from the race.

Conditions were dry for qualifying on Saturday afternoon. Qualifying consisted of three parts, 18, 15 and 12 minutes in length respectively, with five drivers eliminated from competing after each of the first two sessions. Only the two Mercedes drivers were capable of proceeding into the second part of qualifying (Q2) without having to use the faster, soft tyres. Nico Rosberg was fastest, ahead of Williams' Valtteri Bottas and Lewis Hamilton. As Carlos Sainz was unable to compete following his crash in practice, only four running drivers were eliminated. Those were both Marussia drivers, the Sauber of Marcus Ericsson and Fernando Alonso for McLaren.

The two Mercedes exchanged new track record times as Rosberg, then Hamilton, and once again Rosberg set fast times during Q2. Bottas was again the fastest non-Mercedes runner, but teammate Felipe Massa was hindered by traffic and did not proceed into Q3. Also eliminated were Pastor Maldonado, Jenson Button, Felipe Nasr, and Daniil Kvyat, the latter two being bettered by a late fast lap from Max Verstappen.

Nico Rosberg was again fastest in Q3, denying teammate Hamilton his fiftieth career pole position in the process. His time of 1m37.113 was more than three-tenths of a second quicker than Hamilton's, ensuring he started from the front of the grid for the second race running. Valtteri Bottas confirmed his strong pace and qualified third, marginally ahead of Sebastian Vettel. The second Ferrari of Kimi Räikkönen was almost half a second behind in fifth, having made a mistake at turn 13, followed by the two Force India cars of Nico Hülkenberg and Sergio Pérez. Hamilton had also gone off at turn 13 on his second fast lap, preventing him from challenging Rosberg for pole position.

=== Race ===
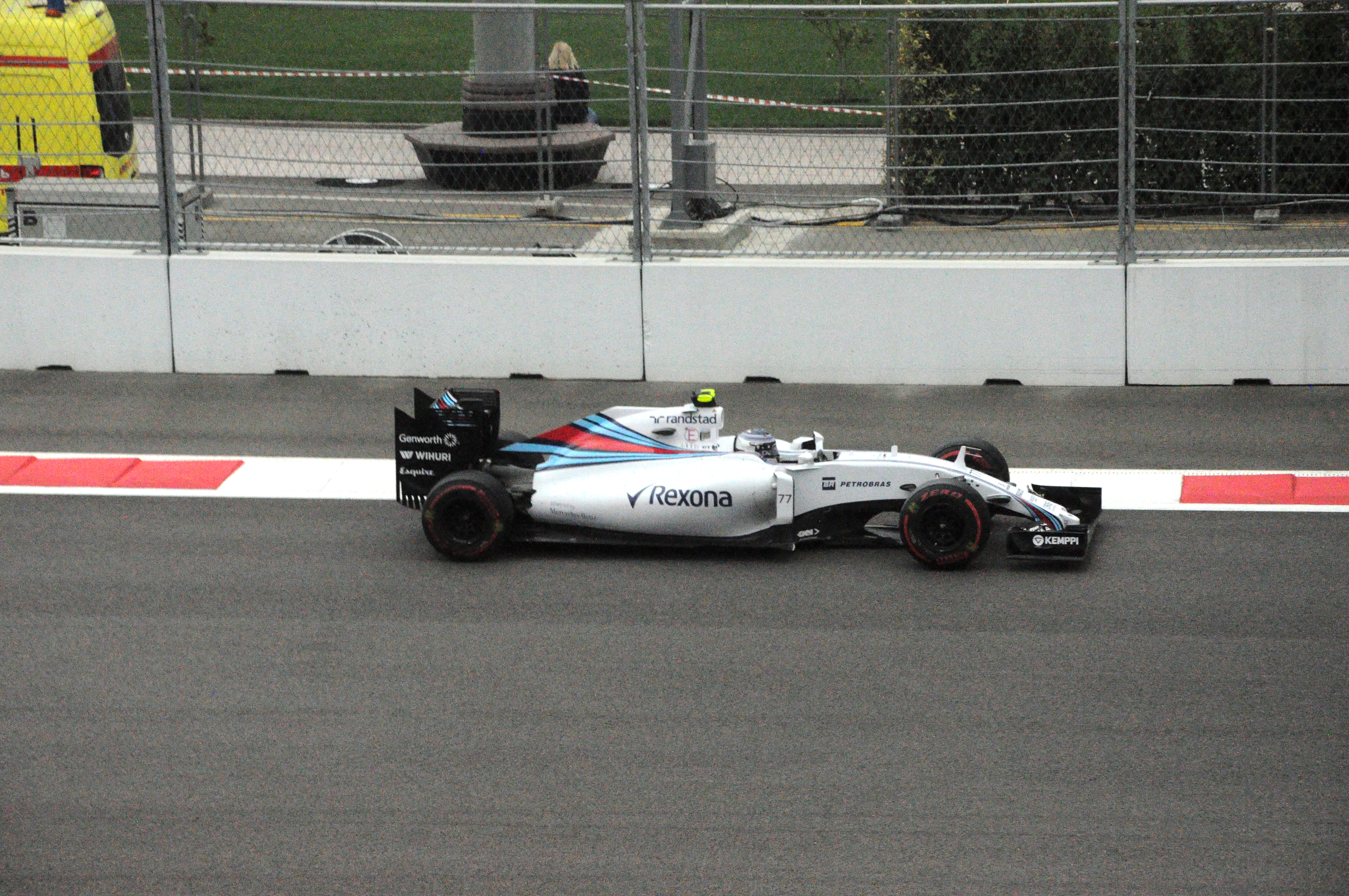
Valtteri Bottas qualified third but retired after a collision on the last lap.

Carlos Sainz was cleared to race albeit not setting a time in qualifying, being allowed to start from the back of the grid. At the start, Nico Rosberg led away from Lewis Hamilton, while further back, Nico Hülkenberg spun into turn two, tagging Max Verstappen and Marcus Ericsson. Verstappen had a puncture while Hülkenberg and Ericsson retired on the spot, causing the safety car to be deployed. Meanwhile, Räikkönen and Kvyat experienced good starts, gaining two and four places respectively. Racing resumed on the end of lap 3, with Rosberg retaining his race lead. However, further back Bottas overtook Räikkönen to take third. By lap 7, Sainz had moved up into 14th place, while Felipe Massa was up into ninth place from 15th on the grid. Race leader Nico Rosberg needed to retire at the end of the seventh lap due to a locked throttle, handing the race lead to championship leader Lewis Hamilton. On lap 10, Pastor Maldonado moved ahead of Jenson Button to take tenth, while Hamilton was extending his lead over second placed Bottas. A second safety car phase occurred on lap 12, when Romain Grosjean lost the back of his Lotus in turn 3 and crashed into the barriers. While Grosjean escaped uninjured, his car was heavily damaged. With a lot of debris on track, the safety car stayed out until lap 17. At the restart, Vettel attacked teammate Räikkönen for third. While the Finn was able to stay ahead by going wide into turn 2, he subsequently gave up the place to Vettel. One lap later, Ricciardo and Sainz fought for tenth place, with Daniel Ricciardo coming out on top and retaining the position.

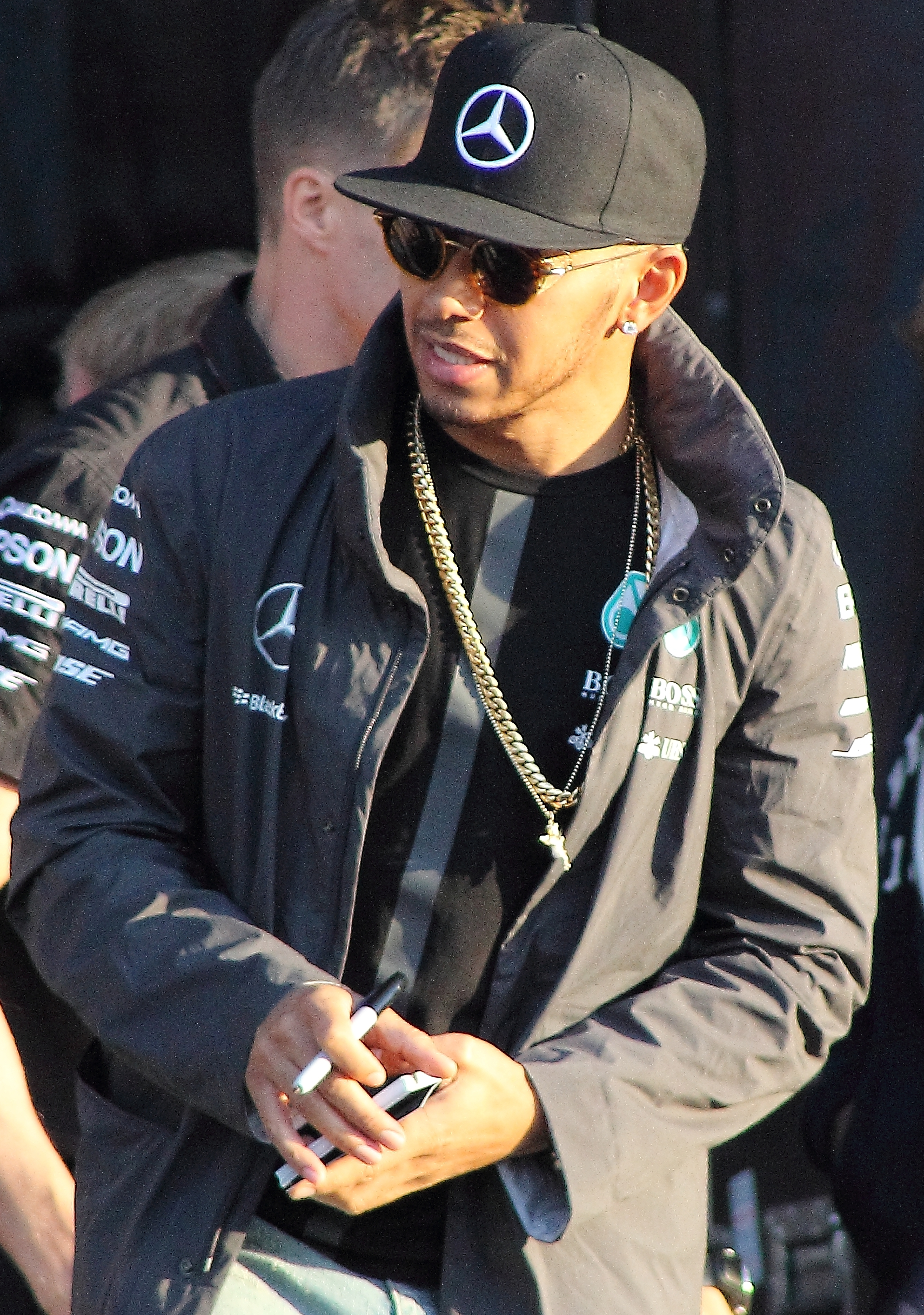
Lewis Hamilton won the race for Mercedes.

By lap 20, Max Verstappen, impeded by his tyre failure at the start, had moved up into twelfth while at the front, Hamilton extended his advantage over Bottas to 7.5 seconds on lap 24 with Vettel also moving closer to the Finn. After several drivers had opted to pit during the second safety car phase, most drivers at the front decided to come in for their regular pit stops starting on lap 25. Carlos Sainz crossed the white line when exiting pit lane, receiving a five-second penalty to be served at his second stop. Bottas was the first of the front runners to pit on lap 27, emerging into traffic. This allowed Sebastian Vettel to make up time by staying out longer, eventually emerging from his pit stop ahead of Bottas on lap 31. One lap later, Räikkönen made a pit stop as well, coming out just behind Bottas. Race leader Hamilton came in another lap later, retaining his lead without incident. On lap 37, Räikkönen used the Drag Reduction System (DRS) to move ahead of Bottas for fifth place, only for the Williams driver to retake the position in the next corner.

An early pit stop during the safety car phase had put Sergio Pérez up into third place, with Daniel Ricciardo behind in fourth. By lap 43, Ricciardo, Bottas and Räikkönen had all moved into striking distance of Pérez, who was trying to keep his older tyres alive. On lap 45, Bottas used DRS to move ahead of Ricciardo's Red Bull. One lap later, Räikkönen tried to follow suit, only to run wide, having to concede the position back to Ricciardo. On lap 47, Carlos Sainz retired after spinning off the track due to a brake failure, losing his rear wing. Retrieving the wing from the track under racing conditions, a track marshall was called "one very brave Russian" by the passing Sebastian Vettel, who barely avoided contact. Just after being passed by Räikkönen on lap 49, Daniel Ricciardo had to retire with a suspension failure. The end of lap 52 saw Valtteri Bottas move ahead of Pérez into third place, with Räikkönen moving past the Force India as well. However, just some corners later on the last lap of the race, the two collided, forcing Bottas to retire and causing heavy damage to Räikkönen's Ferrari. Pérez thereby reclaimed third place and achieved Force India's first podium finish of the season. At the front, Vettel moved closer to Hamilton due to the latter suffering from a compromised rear wing, probably caused by rubber debris in the slot gap. However, Hamilton held on and took his ninth victory of the season, finishing ahead of Vettel, who was now his closest championship rival.

=== Post-race ===
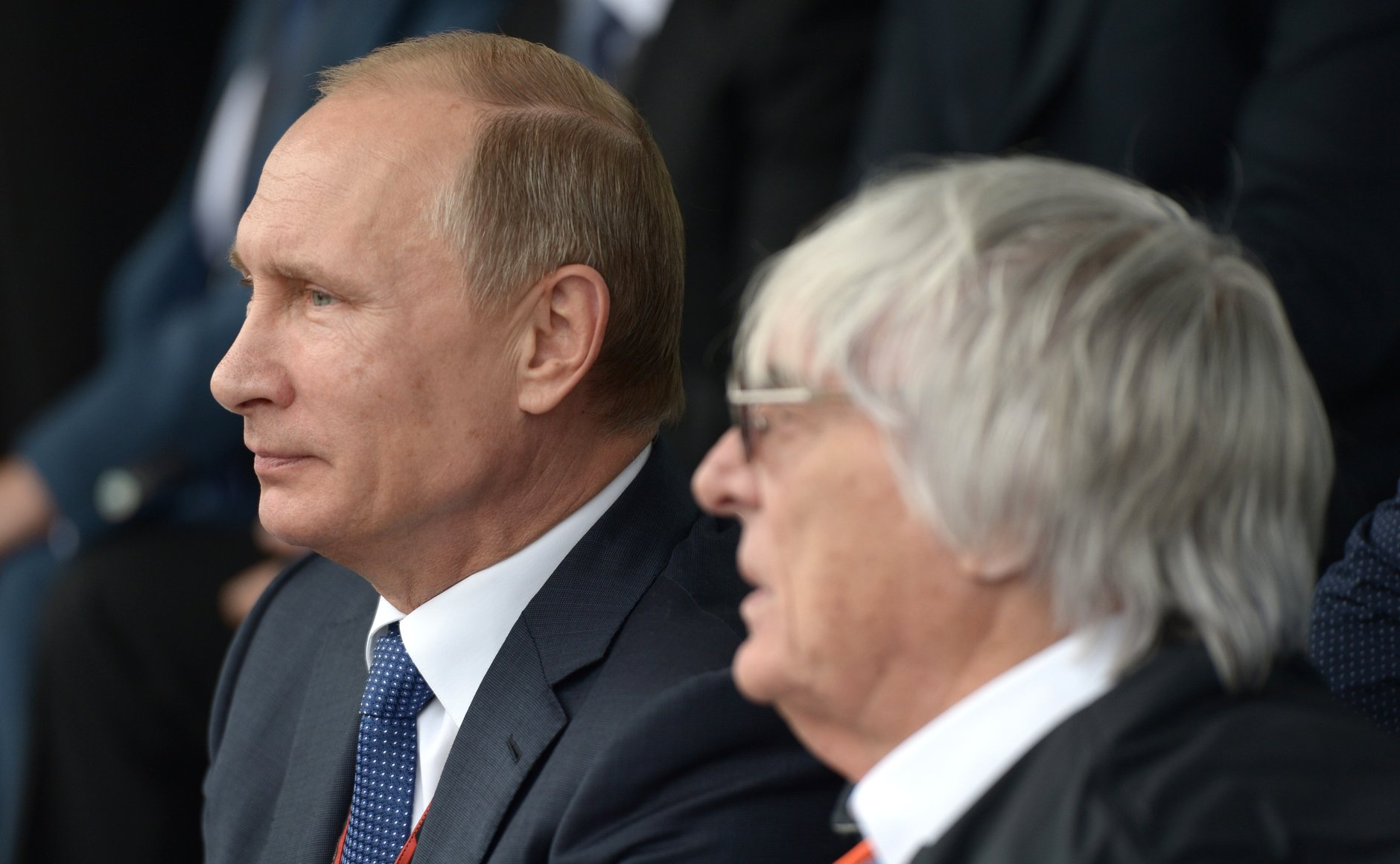
Russian President Vladimir Putin and Bernie Ecclestone during the race

Räikkönen was demoted from fifth to eighth place for causing the last-lap collision with Bottas and scored only four points rather than ten; this secured the constructors' championship for Mercedes. McLaren driver Fernando Alonso was given a five-second penalty for exceeding track limits, promoting Toro Rosso's Max Verstappen to tenth. When asked about the collision with Bottas at the press conference for the following United States Grand Prix, Räikkönen remained unrepentant, saying: "[My view] hasn't changed. There were some discussions. I would still do it tomorrow again, that doesn't change the story." Bottas took a different viewpoint, saying: "I don't think it was a racing incident. I didn't see anyone there and I was in front, and then suddenly someone hits me. I should be on the podium, but I'm here with zero points instead. That's just disappointing."

Former Jordan team principal Eddie Jordan carried out the podium interviews. Hamilton expressed disappointment at not being able to battle his teammate to win the race, while he also said that the title was "not done and dusted". Sebastian Vettel expressed satisfaction with his car, saying that he had hoped to be able to catch Hamilton towards the end of the race. However, he was disappointed by not having both Ferrari cars on the podium. Sergio Pérez said that he had been "really unhappy" with himself until the last lap that handed him third place, calling the result "just amazing". He later called the race "the best moment in my career".

After the race, Vettel criticised Hamilton for what he believed was excessive low speed at the restart after the safety car period, calling his behaviour "ridiculous". He added: "There was no reason to go that slow. If you want to pack up the field you can do it earlier and not in the very last bit." Following his 46G impact on Saturday, Carlos Sainz said that he felt "a bit of dizziness" in the early stages of the Grand Prix, but said that "after lap 10 it went off and I could push normally without problems." After his accident on lap twelve, Romain Grosjean spoke of his "biggest impact for quite a while". He said that the seat of his car had broken at impact, but noted that he was able to escape unharmed: "It's a testament to all the safety inherent in the car and the other safety devices."

As a result of the race, Mercedes extended their lead in the Constructors' Championship to 172 points, enough to secure their second consecutive title. Williams was still in third on 220 points, 71 points ahead of Red Bull. In the Drivers' Standings, Lewis Hamilton's lead over second place grew to 66 points, with his closest challenger now being Sebastian Vettel. Nico Rosberg dropped to third, seven points behind Vettel on 229 points.

== Classification ==
=== Qualifying ===
Pos.	Car no.	Driver	Constructor	Qualifying times			Final grid
Pos.	Car no.	Driver	Constructor	Q1	Q2	Q3	Final grid
1	6	(Germany) Nico Rosberg	Mercedes	1:38.343	1:37.500	1:37.113	1
2	44	(United Kingdom) Lewis Hamilton	Mercedes	1:38.558	1:37.672	1:37.433	2
3	77	(Finland) Valtteri Bottas	Williams-Mercedes	1:38.448	1:38.194	1:37.912	3
4	5	(Germany) Sebastian Vettel	Ferrari	1:38.598	1:38.402	1:37.965	4
5	7	(Finland) Kimi Räikkönen	Ferrari	1:39.207	1:38.224	1:38.348	5
6	27	(Germany) Nico Hülkenberg	Force India-Mercedes	1:39.250	1:38.727	1:38.659	6
7	11	(Mexico) Sergio Pérez	Force India-Mercedes	1:39.617	1:38.914	1:38.691	7
8	8	(France) Romain Grosjean	Lotus-Mercedes	1:39.056	1:38.754	1:38.787	8
9	33	(Netherlands) Max Verstappen	Toro Rosso-Renault	1:39.411	1:39.119	1:38.924	9
10	3	(Australia) Daniel Ricciardo	Red Bull Racing-Renault	1:39.574	1:39.005	1:39.728	10
11	26	(Russia) Daniil Kvyat	Red Bull Racing-Renault	1:39.580	1:39.214		11
12	12	(Brazil) Felipe Nasr	Sauber-Ferrari	1:40.042	1:39.323		12
13	22	(United Kingdom) Jenson Button	McLaren-Honda	1:39.739	1:39.763		13
14	13	(Venezuela) Pastor Maldonado	Lotus-Mercedes	1:39.724	1:39.811		14
15	19	(Brazil) Felipe Massa	Williams-Mercedes	1:38.926	1:39.895		15
16	14	(Spain) Fernando Alonso	McLaren-Honda	1:40.144			19^{1}
17	9	(Sweden) Marcus Ericsson	Sauber-Ferrari	1:40.660			16
18	28	(United Kingdom) Will Stevens	Marussia-Ferrari	1:43.693			17
19	98	(Spain) Roberto Merhi	Marussia-Ferrari	1:43.804			18^{2}
107% time: 1:45.227
—	55	(Spain) Carlos Sainz Jr.	Toro Rosso-Renault	no time			20^{3}^{,4}

Notes

- ^1 – Fernando Alonso received a thirty-five-place grid penalty for a variety of changes made to his power unit.
- ^2 – Roberto Merhi received a twenty-place grid penalty for a variety of changes made to his power unit.
- ^3 – Carlos Sainz Jr. did not take part in qualifying after a heavy crash during FP3; he was later permitted to race by the stewards.
- ^4 – Carlos Sainz Jr. received a twenty-place grid penalty for a variety of changes made to his power unit and replacing his gearbox.

=== Race ===
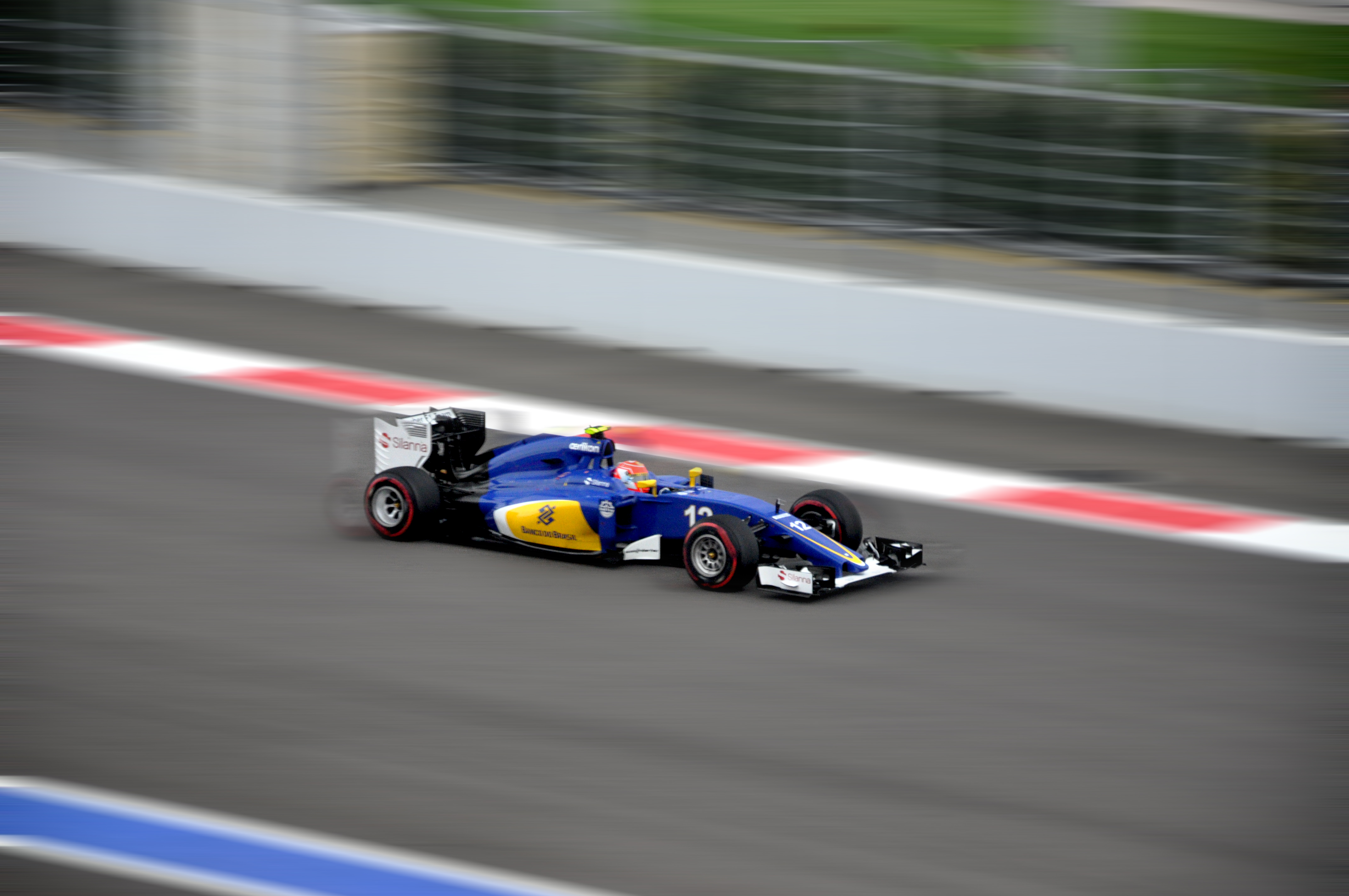
Felipe Nasr recorded his second-best result of the season in sixth place.

Pos.	No.	Driver	Constructor	Laps	Time/Retired	Grid	Points
1	44	(United Kingdom) Lewis Hamilton	Mercedes	53	1:37:11.024	2	25
2	5	(Germany) Sebastian Vettel	Ferrari	53	+5.953	4	18
3	11	(Mexico) Sergio Pérez	Force India-Mercedes	53	+28.918	7	15
4	19	(Brazil) Felipe Massa	Williams-Mercedes	53	+38.831	15	12
5	26	(Russia) Daniil Kvyat	Red Bull Racing-Renault	53	+47.566	11	10
6	12	(Brazil) Felipe Nasr	Sauber-Ferrari	53	+56.508	12	8
7	13	(Venezuela) Pastor Maldonado	Lotus-Mercedes	53	+1:01.088	14	6
8^{1}	7	(Finland) Kimi Räikkönen	Ferrari	53	+1:12.358	5	4
9	22	(United Kingdom) Jenson Button	McLaren-Honda	53	+1:19.467	13	2
10	33	(Netherlands) Max Verstappen	Toro Rosso-Renault	53	+1:28.424	9	1
11^{2}	14	(Spain) Fernando Alonso	McLaren-Honda	53	+1:31.210	19	
12^{4}	77	(Finland) Valtteri Bottas	Williams-Mercedes	52	Collision	3	
13	98	(Spain) Roberto Merhi	Marussia-Ferrari	52	+1 Lap	18	
14	28	(United Kingdom) Will Stevens	Marussia-Ferrari	51	+2 Laps	17	
15^{4}	3	(Australia) Daniel Ricciardo	Red Bull Racing-Renault	47	Suspension	10	
Ret^{3}	55	(Spain) Carlos Sainz Jr.	Toro Rosso-Renault	45	Brakes	20	
Ret	8	(France) Romain Grosjean	Lotus-Mercedes	11	Accident	8	
Ret	6	(Germany) Nico Rosberg	Mercedes	7	Throttle	1	
Ret	27	(Germany) Nico Hülkenberg	Force India-Mercedes	0	Collision	6	
Ret	9	(Sweden) Marcus Ericsson	Sauber-Ferrari	0	Collision	16	

Notes

- ^1 – Kimi Räikkönen originally finished fifth but received a 30-second time penalty after the race following a collision with Valtteri Bottas.
- ^2 – Fernando Alonso originally finished tenth but received a 5-second time penalty after the race for exceeding track limits.
- ^3 – Carlos Sainz Jr. received a 5-second penalty after the race for crossing the line at the pit entry, but he retired.
- ^4 – Valtteri Bottas and Daniel Ricciardo were classified as they completed over 90% of the race distance.

== Championship standings after the race ==
Drivers' Championship standings

	Pos.	Driver	Points
	1	(United Kingdom) **Lewis Hamilton***	302
1	2	(Germany) **Sebastian Vettel***	236
1	3	(Germany) **Nico Rosberg***	229
	4	(Finland) Kimi Räikkönen	123
	5	(Finland) Valtteri Bottas	111

Constructors' Championship standings

Pos.	Constructor	Points
1	(Germany) **Mercedes**	531
2	(Italy) Ferrari	359
3	(United Kingdom) Williams-Mercedes	220
4	(Austria) Red Bull Racing-Renault	149
5	Force India-Mercedes	92

- Note: Only the top five positions are included for both sets of standings.
- **Bold text** indicates the 2015 World Constructors' Champions.
- **Bold text** and an asterisk indicates competitors who still had a mathematical chance of becoming World Champion.

== See also ==
- 2015 Sochi GP2 Series round
- 2015 Sochi GP3 Series round

Previous race: 2015 Japanese Grand Prix	FIA Formula One World Championship; 2015 season	Next race: 2015 United States Grand Prix
Previous race: 2014 Russian Grand Prix	Russian Grand Prix	Next race: 2016 Russian Grand Prix
