= Hot lap =

Timed lap in racing

A hot lap is a high-speed, timed lap around a race track where a driver pushes a vehicle to its absolute performance limit to achieve the fastest possible time. Unlike a "warm-up" or "cool-down" lap, the goal of a hot lap is maximum efficiency through corners and top speed on straights, often to determine a starting position in qualifying or to test the car’s mechanical boundaries. Success depends on perfectly managing tire grip, braking points, and the racing line while crossing the start and finish lines at full acceleration.

== In motor racing ==
A 'hot lap', also called a 'flying lap' or a 'timed lap', is a complete lap around a racetrack that takes place in free practice or qualification, the time of which is recorded. In general, when hot lapping, the goal is to achieve the fastest possible time around the circuit. During practice, this may just be to achieve a personal record, or a track record. In qualification, it is typically used to get the best possible starting grid position.

== In ice hockey ==
Hot-lapping may also refer to a superstitious routine that ice hockey players, and sometimes other team personnel, perform hours before a game for good luck, in which one skates around the perimeter of the rink alone. For example, the Washington Capitals have employed hot-lapping in preparation for games during their 2018 Stanley Cup championship run, as well as their Stanley Cup Final opponent, the Vegas Golden Knights.
