= 2017 Italian Grand Prix =

Race 13 of 20 in the 2017 Formula One World Championship
← Previous race	Next race →
- Layout of the Monza circuit

Race details
- Date: 3 September 2017
- Official name: Formula 1 Gran Premio Heineken d'Italia 2017
- Location: Autodromo Nazionale di Monza; Monza, Italy
- Course: Permanent racing facility
- Course length: 5.793 km (3.600 miles)
- Distance: 53 laps, 306.720 km (190.587 miles)
- Weather: Sunny
- Attendance: 185,000

Pole position
Driver	(United Kingdom) Lewis Hamilton	Mercedes
- Time: 1:35.544

Fastest lap
Driver	(Australia) Daniel Ricciardo	Red Bull Racing-TAG Heuer
- Time: 1:23.361 on lap 49

Podium
First	(United Kingdom) Lewis Hamilton	Mercedes
Second	(Finland) Valtteri Bottas	Mercedes
Third	(Germany) Sebastian Vettel	Ferrari

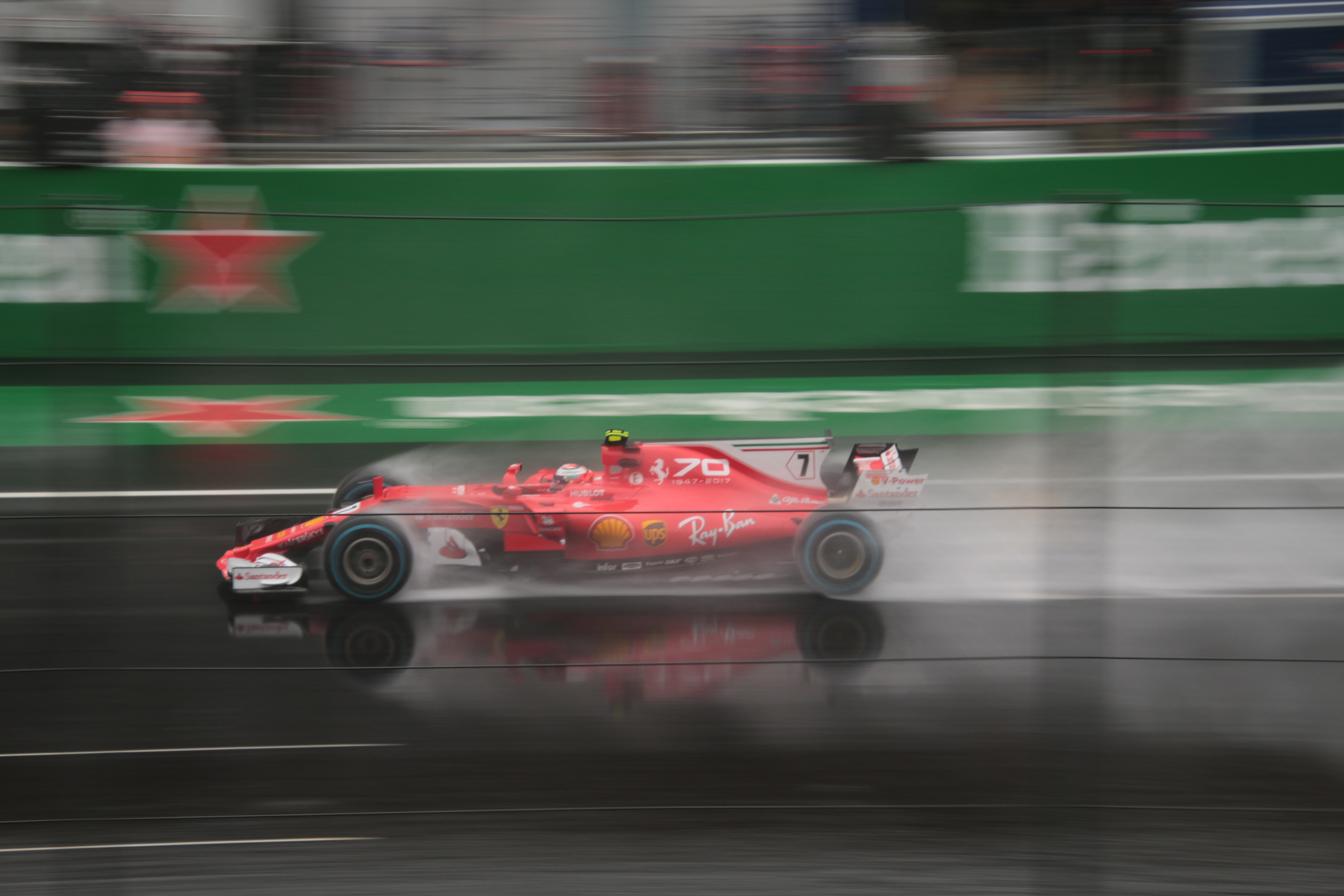
Ferrari celebrated their 70th anniversary and both Vettel and Räikkönen ran with a special livery.

The 2017 Italian Grand Prix (formally known as the Formula 1 Gran Premio Heineken d'Italia 2017) was a Formula One motor race held on 3 September 2017 at the Autodromo Nazionale di Monza in Monza, Italy. It was the thirteenth round of the 2017 FIA Formula One World Championship, and marked the 87th running of the Italian Grand Prix and the 82nd time the race was held at Monza.

Ferrari driver Sebastian Vettel entered the round with a seven-point lead over Lewis Hamilton in the World Drivers' Championship, with Valtteri Bottas forty-one points behind in third. In the World Constructors' Championship, Mercedes led Ferrari by thirty-nine points with Red Bull Racing in third. Hamilton started the race from pole position, the sixty-ninth of his career. With this pole position, he broke Michael Schumacher's record for the most pole positions in a career.

The race concluded with Hamilton leading the championship by 3 points ahead of Vettel.

The grid order for the race was considered somewhat farcical, due to the number of grid penalties that were taken in the race equalling 150 and making the grid almost unrecognisable from the qualifying results. Only 4 drivers started in their qualifying positions, with only Hamilton of the four not having taken a penalty. Sergio Pérez, meanwhile, moved up 1 place on the grid despite having a 5-place grid penalty.

== Report ==
=== Practice ===
Mercedes drivers Lewis Hamilton and Valtteri Bottas set the fastest times in first and second practice respectively, with times of 1:21.537 and 1:21.406.

Third practice was disrupted by heavy rain on the circuit, and the green flag was only shown with 16 minutes remaining. Williams driver Felipe Massa set the quickest time with a 1:40.660.

=== Qualifying ===
The heavy rains that delayed the start of Free Practice 3 remained over the region, causing qualifying to be interrupted. The session started on time, but was red-flagged when Romain Grosjean spun into the barriers. After almost two hours of waiting for the track to clear up, the session resumed with Lewis Hamilton taking pole ahead of the two Red Bulls. Due to grid penalties for both Red Bulls, Lance Stroll was promoted to second, becoming the youngest front row starter in a Formula One race. Esteban Ocon was promoted to third ahead of Bottas, Räikkönen and Vettel.

=== Race ===
The race was welcomed by clear sky with Hamilton on pole ahead of Stroll and Ocon. Hamilton got away well as Stroll was conservative into turn 1 and was passed by Ocon. Further behind there was contact between Massa and Perez. A few laps later, Verstappen moved to the outside at turn 1 but hit Massa which caused Verstappen to get a right front tyre puncture. The stewards took no further action for this incident, but did give Jolyon Palmer a five-second time penalty for overtaking Fernando Alonso off-track (Alonso repeatedly complained about the penalty, going as far as to proclaim "KARMA!" upon hearing Palmer had retired around the halfway point due to a mechanical issue). There were good battles further behind including Räikkönen, Ocon and Stroll. During the only round of pit stops (most drivers made only one stop in the race), all these drivers retained their positions. Further behind, Ricciardo was 5th but overtook Räikkönen into turn 1 and closed in on Vettel. In the end, Mercedes finished with a 1–2, with Lewis Hamilton winning ahead of the second-placed Valtteri Bottas. Vettel finished third ahead of a charging Ricciardo. On the final lap, Massa attacked Stroll but couldn't overtake him and finished 8th. Verstappen recovered from the early puncture to finish 10th after small incidents with the two Haas drivers (Romain Grosjean and Kevin Magnussen).

== Classification ==
=== Qualifying ===
Pos.	Car no.	Driver	Constructor	Qualifying times			Final grid
Pos.	Car no.	Driver	Constructor	Q1	Q2	Q3	Final grid
1	44	(United Kingdom) Lewis Hamilton	Mercedes	1:36.009	1:34.660	1:35.554	1
2	33	(Netherlands) Max Verstappen	Red Bull Racing-TAG Heuer	1:37.344	1:36.113	1:36.702	13^{1}
3	3	(Australia) Daniel Ricciardo	Red Bull Racing-TAG Heuer	1:38.304	1:37.313	1:36.841	16^{2}
4	18	(Canada) Lance Stroll	Williams-Mercedes	1:37.653	1:37.002	1:37.032	2
5	31	(France) Esteban Ocon	Force India-Mercedes	1:38.775	1:37.580	1:37.719	3
6	77	(Finland) Valtteri Bottas	Mercedes	1:35.716	1:35.396	1:37.833	4
7	7	(Finland) Kimi Räikkönen	Ferrari	1:38.235	1:37.031	1:37.987	5
8	5	(Germany) Sebastian Vettel	Ferrari	1:37.198	1:36.223	1:38.064	6
9	19	(Brazil) Felipe Massa	Williams-Mercedes	1:38.338	1:37.456	1:38.251	7
10	2	(Belgium) Stoffel Vandoorne	McLaren-Honda	1:38.767	1:37.471	1:39.157	18^{3}
11	11	(Mexico) Sergio Pérez	Force India-Mercedes	1:38.511	1:37.582		10^{4}
12	27	(Germany) Nico Hülkenberg	Renault	1:39.242	1:38.059		14^{5}
13	14	(Spain) Fernando Alonso	McLaren-Honda	1:39.134	1:38.202		19^{6}
14	26	(Russia) Daniil Kvyat	Toro Rosso	1:39.183	1:38.245		8
15	55	(Spain) Carlos Sainz Jr.	Toro Rosso	1:39.788	1:38.526		15^{7}
16	20	(Denmark) Kevin Magnussen	Haas-Ferrari	1:40.489			9
17	30	(United Kingdom) Jolyon Palmer	Renault	1:40.646			17^{8}
18	9	(Sweden) Marcus Ericsson	Sauber-Ferrari	1:41.732			11
19	94	(Germany) Pascal Wehrlein	Sauber-Ferrari	1:41.875			12
107% time: 1:42.416
—	8	(France) Romain Grosjean	Haas-Ferrari	1:43.355			20^{9}

Notes

- ^1 – Max Verstappen received a 20-place grid penalty for exceeding his quota of power unit components.
- ^2 – Daniel Ricciardo received a 25-place grid penalty for exceeding his quota of power unit components and an unscheduled gearbox change.
- ^3 – Stoffel Vandoorne received a 25-place grid penalty for exceeding his quota of power unit components.
- ^4 – Sergio Pérez received a 5-place grid penalty for an unscheduled gearbox change.
- ^5 – Nico Hülkenberg received a 10-place grid penalty for exceeding his quota of power unit components.
- ^6 – Fernando Alonso received a 35-place grid penalty for exceeding his quota of power unit components.
- ^7 – Carlos Sainz Jr. received a 10-place grid penalty for exceeding his quota of power unit components.
- ^8 – Jolyon Palmer received a 15-place grid penalty for exceeding his quota of power unit components.
- ^9 – Romain Grosjean failed to set a time within the 107% requirement, but received permission from the stewards to start the race. He also received a 5-place grid penalty for an unscheduled gearbox change.

=== Race ===
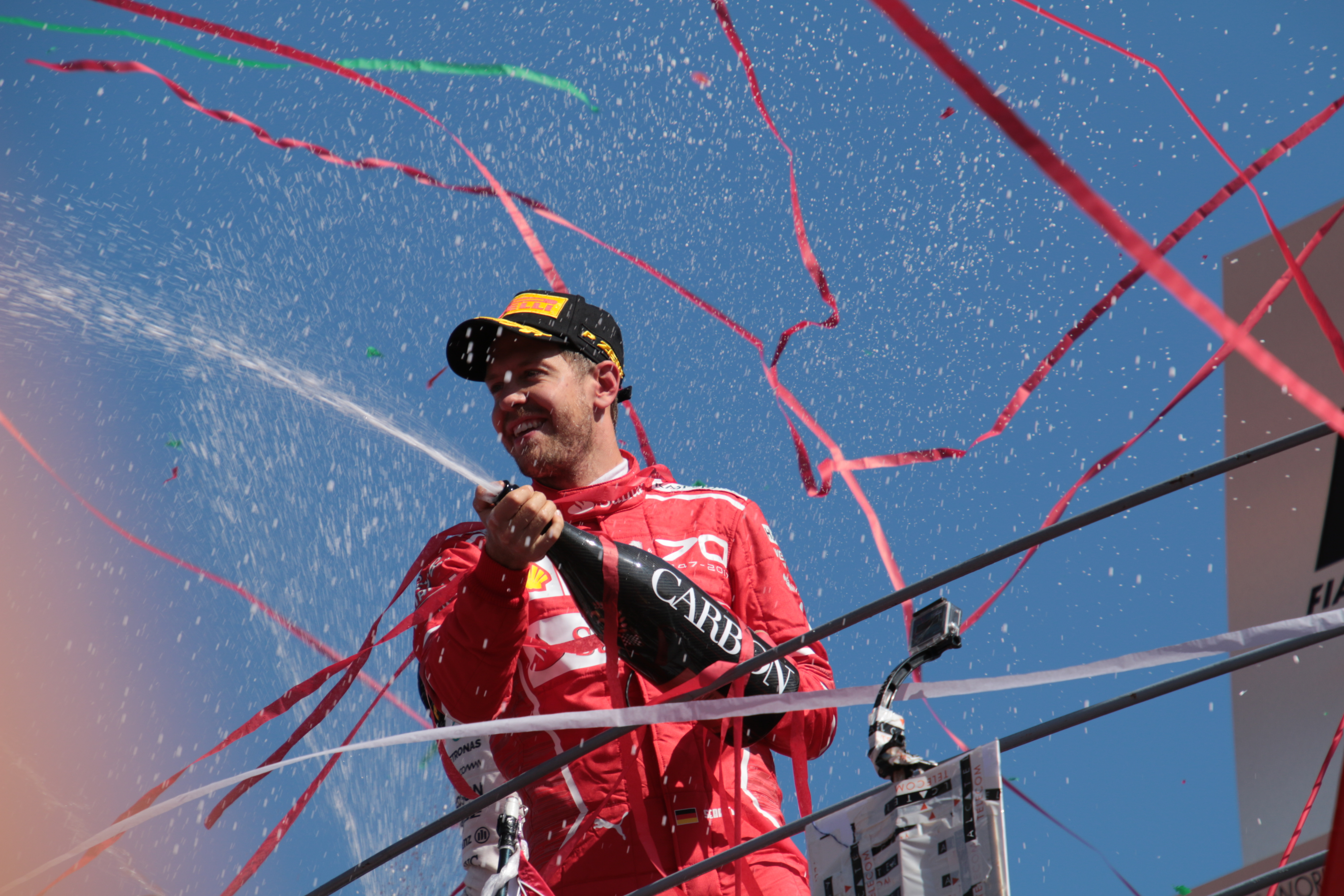
Sebastian Vettel during the podium ceremony celebrations

Pos.	No.	Driver	Constructor	Laps	Time/Retired	Grid	Points
1	44	(United Kingdom) Lewis Hamilton	Mercedes	53	1:15:32.312	1	25
2	77	(Finland) Valtteri Bottas	Mercedes	53	+4.471	4	18
3	5	(Germany) Sebastian Vettel	Ferrari	53	+36.317	6	15
4	3	(Australia) Daniel Ricciardo	Red Bull Racing-TAG Heuer	53	+40.335	16	12
5	7	(Finland) Kimi Räikkönen	Ferrari	53	+1:00.082	5	10
6	31	(France) Esteban Ocon	Force India-Mercedes	53	+1:11.528	3	8
7	18	(Canada) Lance Stroll	Williams-Mercedes	53	+1:14.156	2	6
8	19	(Brazil) Felipe Massa	Williams-Mercedes	53	+1:14.834	7	4
9	11	(Mexico) Sergio Pérez	Force India-Mercedes	53	+1:15.276	10	2
10	33	(Netherlands) Max Verstappen	Red Bull Racing-TAG Heuer	52	+1 Lap	13	1
11	20	(Denmark) Kevin Magnussen	Haas-Ferrari	52	+1 Lap	9	
12	26	(Russia) Daniil Kvyat	Toro Rosso	52	+1 Lap	8	
13	27	(Germany) Nico Hülkenberg	Renault	52	+1 Lap	14	
14	55	(Spain) Carlos Sainz Jr.	Toro Rosso	52	+1 Lap	15	
15	8	(France) Romain Grosjean	Haas-Ferrari	52	+1 Lap	20	
16	94	(Germany) Pascal Wehrlein	Sauber-Ferrari	51	+2 Laps	12	
17^{1}	14	(Spain) Fernando Alonso	McLaren-Honda	50	Clutch	19	
18^{1}	9	(Sweden) Marcus Ericsson	Sauber-Ferrari	49	Suspension	11	
Ret	2	(Belgium) Stoffel Vandoorne	McLaren-Honda	33	Electrical	18	
Ret	30	(United Kingdom) Jolyon Palmer	Renault	29	Transmission	17	

Notes

- ^1 – Fernando Alonso and Marcus Ericsson retired from the race, but were classified as they had completed 90% of the race distance.

== Championship standings after the race ==
Drivers' Championship standings

	Pos.	Driver	Points
1	1	(United Kingdom) Lewis Hamilton	238
1	2	(Germany) Sebastian Vettel	235
	3	(Finland) Valtteri Bottas	197
	4	(Australia) Daniel Ricciardo	144
	5	(Finland) Kimi Räikkönen	138

Constructors' Championship standings

Pos.	Constructor	Points
1	(Germany) Mercedes	435
2	(Italy) Ferrari	373
3	(Austria) Red Bull Racing-TAG Heuer	212
4	Force India-Mercedes	113
5	(United Kingdom) Williams-Mercedes	55

- Note: Only the top five positions are included for both sets of standings.

== See also ==
- 2017 Monza Formula 2 round
- 2017 Monza GP3 Series round

Previous race: 2017 Belgian Grand Prix	FIA Formula One World Championship; 2017 season	Next race: 2017 Singapore Grand Prix
Previous race: 2016 Italian Grand Prix	Italian Grand Prix	Next race: 2018 Italian Grand Prix
