= 2017 Brazilian Grand Prix =

Race 19 of 20 in the 2017 Formula One World Championship
← Previous race	Next race →
- Layout of the Autódromo José Carlos Pace

Race details
- Date: 12 November 2017
- Official name: Formula 1 Grande Prêmio Heineken do Brasil 2017
- Location: Autódromo José Carlos Pace, São Paulo, Brazil
- Course: Permanent racing facility
- Course length: 4.309 km (2.677 miles)
- Distance: 71 laps, 305.909 km (190.083 miles)
- Weather: Sunny
- Attendance: 141,218

Pole position
Driver	(Finland) Valtteri Bottas	Mercedes
- Time: 1:08.322

Fastest lap
Driver	(Netherlands) Max Verstappen	Red Bull Racing-TAG Heuer
- Time: 1:11.044 on lap 64

Podium
First	(Germany) Sebastian Vettel	Ferrari
Second	(Finland) Valtteri Bottas	Mercedes
Third	(Finland) Kimi Räikkönen	Ferrari

The 2017 Brazilian Grand Prix (formally known as the Formula 1 Grande Prêmio Heineken do Brasil 2017) was a Formula One motor race held on 12 November 2017 at the Autódromo José Carlos Pace in the Interlagos neighborhood of São Paulo, Brazil. The race was the nineteenth and penultimate round of the 2017 FIA Formula One World Championship and marked the forty-sixth running of the Brazilian Grand Prix, the forty-fifth time that the race had been run as a World Championship event since the inaugural season in 1950, and the thirty-fourth World Championship event to be held at Interlagos.

Mercedes driver Valtteri Bottas started from pole position with Ferrari's Sebastian Vettel and Kimi Räikkönen behind, after World Champion Lewis Hamilton crashed out of qualifying early and started from the pit lane. Vettel overtook Bottas on the first corner, after which he set the pace through most of the race. Vettel won the Grand Prix, followed by Bottas and Räikkönen. Hamilton eventually climbed to fourth, closing to less than one second of a podium finish.

== Report ==
=== Free practice ===
The three free practice session demonstrated very tight competition between Ferrari and Mercedes. In first and second free practice, Lewis Hamilton was quickest, with both Ferraris and both Red Bulls within one second. Felipe Massa and Fernando Alonso were notably strong in these sessions. In the third session, the order was similar. However, Valtteri Bottas pipped Hamilton's best time by three thousands of a second; and neither Max Verstappen nor Massa put in a strong lap. In the final practice round, less than a tenth of a second separated the two Mercedes and two Ferraris.

The first practice session saw George Russell's Formula One debut appearance. There was also an unusual appearance of a test driver (Antonio Giovinazzi) in the second practice session (usually, any test drivers that participate in a racing weekend, do so in the first practice session).

=== Qualifying ===
Qualifying began in a dramatic fashion as World Champion Hamilton lost the back end of the car with over-steer, seemingly due to a driver error, crashing to retire from Q1 without setting a lap time. Räikkönen was fastest in Q1 and Vettel in Q2. In the final qualifying session, however, Bottas took pole position. Vettel qualified a close second, followed by Räikkönen, Verstappen and Daniel Ricciardo. Ricciardo took a 10-place grid penalty for exceeding his quota of power unit components and started 14th on the grid. Hamilton elected to change his gearbox and power unit, so started the race from the pit lane.

=== Race ===
Vettel achieved a good start during the second phase of clutch control to overtake Bottas on the first corner. There were numerous retirements due to collisions on the first lap. Romain Grosjean lost the back end, clipping Esteban Ocon off the track. Ocon's resultant retirement ended his record streak of 27 races finished from his Formula One debut. Stoffel Vandoorne and Kevin Magnussen also retired due to a collision on the first lap.

Hamilton, starting from the pit lane, implemented an inverted tyre strategy running to lap 44 on one set of soft tyres. After overtaking the back-markers and mid-field, he fell into first place as the leading cars – predominantly on one-stop strategies – pitted. Hamilton's only pit-stop positioned him fifth, after which he overtook Verstappen and was briefly able to challenge Räikkönen for the podium, but unable to overtake Raikkonen in third. Ricciardo also battled up to sixth after starting fifteenth on the grid and dropping to seventeenth as collateral of the Vandoorne-Magnussen collision.

Setting the pace through most of the race, Vettel won the Grand Prix, followed by Bottas and Räikkönen. Including Hamilton, the top four finished within the space of 5.5 seconds, with the two Red Bulls more than 30 seconds behind. The following three positions also carried a race-long battle to the finish line, finishing within 1 second of each other. Initially overtaking on lap 5 (as the safety car was pulling into pitlane), Massa held off Alonso who remained close throughout the race. Sergio Pérez also caught up to these two racers to cross the finish line barely behind Alonso.

== Classification ==
=== Qualifying ===
Pos.	Car no.	Driver	Constructor	Qualifying times			Final grid
Pos.	Car no.	Driver	Constructor	Q1	Q2	Q3	Final grid
1	77	(Finland) Valtteri Bottas	Mercedes	1:09.452	1:08.638	1:08.322	1
2	5	(Germany) Sebastian Vettel	Ferrari	1:09.643	1:08.494	1:08.360	2
3	7	(Finland) Kimi Räikkönen	Ferrari	1:09.405	1:09.116	1:08.538	3
4	33	(Netherlands) Max Verstappen	Red Bull Racing-TAG Heuer	1:09.820	1:09.050	1:08.925	4
5	3	(Australia) Daniel Ricciardo	Red Bull Racing-TAG Heuer	1:09.828	1:09.533	1:09.330	14^{1}
6	11	(Mexico) Sergio Pérez	Force India-Mercedes	1:10.145	1:09.760	1:09.598	5
7	14	(Spain) Fernando Alonso	McLaren-Honda	1:10.172	1:09.593	1:09.617	6
8	27	(Germany) Nico Hülkenberg	Renault	1:10.078	1:09.726	1:09.703	7
9	55	(Spain) Carlos Sainz Jr.	Renault	1:10.227	1:09.768	1:09.805	8
10	19	(Brazil) Felipe Massa	Williams-Mercedes	1:09.789	1:09.612	1:09.841	9
11	31	(France) Esteban Ocon	Force India-Mercedes	1:10.168	1:09.830		10
12	8	(France) Romain Grosjean	Haas-Ferrari	1:10.148	1:09.879		11
13	2	(Belgium) Stoffel Vandoorne	McLaren-Honda	1:10.286	1:10.116		12
14	20	(Denmark) Kevin Magnussen	Haas-Ferrari	1:10.521	1:10.154		13
15	28	(New Zealand) Brendon Hartley	Toro Rosso	1:10.625	No time		18^{2}
16	94	(Germany) Pascal Wehrlein	Sauber-Ferrari	1:10.678			15
17	10	(France) Pierre Gasly	Toro Rosso	1:10.686			19^{3}
18	18	(Canada) Lance Stroll	Williams-Mercedes	1:10.776			16^{4}
19	9	(Sweden) Marcus Ericsson	Sauber-Ferrari	1:10.875			17^{5}
107% time: 1:14.263
—	44	(United Kingdom) Lewis Hamilton	Mercedes	No time			PL^{6}

Notes

- ^1 – Daniel Ricciardo received a 10-place grid penalty for exceeding his quota of power unit components.
- ^2 – Brendon Hartley received a 10-place grid penalty for exceeding his quota of power unit components.
- ^3 – Pierre Gasly received a 25-place grid penalty for exceeding his quota of power unit components.
- ^4 – Lance Stroll received a 5-place grid penalty for an unscheduled gearbox change.
- ^5 – Marcus Ericsson received a 5-place grid penalty for an unscheduled gearbox change.
- ^6 – Lewis Hamilton failed to set a time within the 107% requirement, but received permission from the stewards to start the race. He also started from the pit lane due to a gearbox and power unit changes.

=== Race ===
Pos.	No.	Driver	Constructor	Laps	Time/Retired	Grid	Points
1	5	(Germany) Sebastian Vettel	Ferrari	71	1:31:26.262	2	25
2	77	(Finland) Valtteri Bottas	Mercedes	71	+2.762	1	18
3	7	(Finland) Kimi Räikkönen	Ferrari	71	+4.600	3	15
4	44	(United Kingdom) Lewis Hamilton	Mercedes	71	+5.468	PL	12
5	33	(Netherlands) Max Verstappen	Red Bull Racing-TAG Heuer	71	+32.940	4	10
6	3	(Australia) Daniel Ricciardo	Red Bull Racing-TAG Heuer	71	+48.691	14	8
7	19	(Brazil) Felipe Massa	Williams-Mercedes	71	+1:08.882	9	6
8	14	(Spain) Fernando Alonso	McLaren-Honda	71	+1:09.363	6	4
9	11	(Mexico) Sergio Pérez	Force India-Mercedes	71	+1:09.500	5	2
10	27	(Germany) Nico Hülkenberg	Renault	70	+1 Lap	7	1
11	55	(Spain) Carlos Sainz Jr.	Renault	70	+1 Lap	8	
12	10	(France) Pierre Gasly	Toro Rosso	70	+1 Lap	19	
13	9	(Sweden) Marcus Ericsson	Sauber-Ferrari	70	+1 Lap	17	
14	94	(Germany) Pascal Wehrlein	Sauber-Ferrari	70	+1 Lap	15	
15	8	(France) Romain Grosjean	Haas-Ferrari	69	+2 Laps	11	
16	18	(Canada) Lance Stroll	Williams-Mercedes	69	+2 Laps	16	
Ret	28	(New Zealand) Brendon Hartley	Toro Rosso	40	Engine	18	
Ret	31	(France) Esteban Ocon	Force India-Mercedes	0	Collision	10	
Ret	2	(Belgium) Stoffel Vandoorne	McLaren-Honda	0	Collision	12	
Ret	20	(Denmark) Kevin Magnussen	Haas-Ferrari	0	Collision	13	

== Championship standings after the race ==
Drivers' Championship standings

Pos.	Driver	Points
1	(United Kingdom) **Lewis Hamilton**	345
2	(Germany) Sebastian Vettel	302
3	(Finland) Valtteri Bottas	280
4	(Australia) Daniel Ricciardo	200
5	(Finland) Kimi Räikkönen	193

Constructors' Championship standings

Pos.	Constructor	Points
1	(Germany) **Mercedes**	625
2	(Italy) Ferrari	495
3	(Austria) Red Bull Racing-TAG Heuer	358
4	Force India-Mercedes	177
5	(United Kingdom) Williams-Mercedes	82

- Note: Only the top five positions are included for the sets of standings.
- **Bold text** indicates the 2017 World Champions.

Previous race: 2017 Mexican Grand Prix	FIA Formula One World Championship; 2017 season	Next race: 2017 Abu Dhabi Grand Prix
Previous race: 2016 Brazilian Grand Prix	Brazilian Grand Prix	Next race: 2018 Brazilian Grand Prix
