= 2017 Singapore Grand Prix =

Race 14 of 20 in the 2017 Formula One World Championship
← Previous race	Next race →
- Layout of the Marina Bay Street Circuit

Race details
- Date: 17 September 2017
- Official name: 2017 Formula 1 Singapore Airlines Singapore Grand Prix
- Location: Marina Bay Street Circuit; Marina Bay, Singapore
- Course: Temporary street circuit
- Course length: 5.065 km (3.147 miles)
- Distance: 58 laps, 293.633 km (182.455 miles)
- Scheduled distance: 61 laps, 308.828 km (191.897 miles)
- Weather: Wet at start, then drying. Air temperature: 28°C (82°F)
- Attendance: 260,400

Pole position
Driver	(Germany) Sebastian Vettel	Ferrari
- Time: 1:39.491

Fastest lap
Driver	(United Kingdom) Lewis Hamilton	Mercedes
- Time: 1:45.008 on lap 55 (lap record)

Podium
First	(United Kingdom) Lewis Hamilton	Mercedes
Second	(Australia) Daniel Ricciardo	Red Bull Racing-TAG Heuer
Third	(Finland) Valtteri Bottas	Mercedes

The 2017 Singapore Grand Prix (formally known as the 2017 Formula 1 Singapore Airlines Singapore Grand Prix) was a Formula One motor race held on 17 September 2017 at the Marina Bay Street Circuit in Marina Bay, Singapore. It was the fourteenth round of the 2017 FIA Formula One World Championship, and marked the eighteenth running of the Singapore Grand Prix, the tenth time the race had been held at Marina Bay.

Mercedes driver Lewis Hamilton entered the round with a three-point lead over Ferrari's Sebastian Vettel in the World Drivers' Championship, with Valtteri Bottas third. In the Constructors' standings, Mercedes led Ferrari by 62 points, while Red Bull Racing were third.

The race was won by Mercedes's Lewis Hamilton who took the lead on the first lap following a significant collision between Sebastian Vettel, Max Verstappen and Kimi Räikkönen. Daniel Ricciardo finished second with Valtteri Bottas taking third. This result increased Hamilton's lead in the Drivers' Championship to 28 points and increased Mercedes's lead in the Constructors' standings to 102 points.

== Report ==
=== Practice ===
Red Bull's Daniel Ricciardo went fastest in first practice with a time of 1:42.489. He was followed by the Ferrari of Sebastian Vettel and his teammate Max Verstappen while championship leader Lewis Hamilton was only fourth fastest. Ricciardo was also quickest in second practice, followed by Verstappen and Hamilton.

=== Qualifying ===
Max Verstappen was quickest in both Q1 and Q2 as Red Bull seemed to have the advantage over Mercedes and Ferrari. However, Ferrari's Sebastian Vettel took pole in the final session with a lap time of 1.39.491, ahead of Verstappen and teammate Ricciardo. Championship leader Lewis Hamilton could only take fifth on the grid with teammate Bottas sixth.

=== Race ===
Rainfall prior to the race start meant that the race would be the first night-time Grand Prix staged under wet conditions in Formula One history. Despite this, the race was started under normal racing conditions without the safety car as per 2017 rule changes. At the start, Räikkönen had an excellent start compared to his teammate Vettel and Verstappen of Red Bull. Verstappen ended up sandwiched between Vettel and Räikkönen with nowhere to go. Verstappen's tyres touched Räikkönen's car, which went out of control and he hit left sidepod of his teammate Vettel's car, causing significant damage to both. His car then slid forward into turn 1, where it hit Verstappen's car yet again, causing the Red Bull car to collide with Fernando Alonso's car. This resulted in the immediate retirement of both Räikkönen and Verstappen. Vettel was initially able to continue despite noticeable damage, followed by Hamilton, who had a good start with Ricciardo behind. However, Vettel soon spun due to the damage and subsequently retired. Alonso retired on lap 9. The collisions on the opening lap brought out a safety car that led the field until lap 4. This marked the first occasion in Formula One history when both Ferraris were eliminated on the opening lap. At the restart Lewis Hamilton continued to lead, followed by Daniel Ricciardo in second and Nico Hülkenberg in third. Hamilton then was able to pull away and establish a comfortable lead over Ricciardo.

There were two further safety car periods over the course of the race. One on lap 11, after Daniil Kvyat crashed at turn 7, and one on lap 38 after Marcus Ericsson spun. Bottas managed to get up to third and Carlos Sainz to fourth after the first safety car period as those on full wets ahead of them pitted for inters, the tyres Bottas and Sainz were already on. Hamilton was again able to get away well at both restarts. Kevin Magnussen and Nico Hülkenberg – from 4th position after passing Sainz in the second safety car period – would both retire later in the race with mechanical issues. Hamilton won the race from Ricciardo, and Valtteri Bottas took the final podium place, while Sainz achieved his then career-best finish of 4th place. Jolyon Palmer came home in 6th place for his first points finish of the season, on the same weekend it was announced he would be replaced by Sainz at the end of the season. The drivers did not complete the scheduled race distance of 61 laps due to the 2-hour time limit being reached, so the chequered flag was shown on lap 58.

== Classification ==
=== Qualifying ===
Pos.	Car no.	Driver	Constructor	Qualifying times			Final grid
Pos.	Car no.	Driver	Constructor	Q1	Q2	Q3	Final grid
1	5	(Germany) Sebastian Vettel	Ferrari	1:43.336	1:40.529	1:39.491	1
2	33	(Netherlands) Max Verstappen	Red Bull Racing-TAG Heuer	1:42.010	1:40.332	1:39.814	2
3	3	(Australia) Daniel Ricciardo	Red Bull Racing-TAG Heuer	1:42.063	1:40.385	1:39.840	3
4	7	(Finland) Kimi Räikkönen	Ferrari	1:43.328	1:40.525	1:40.069	4
5	44	(United Kingdom) Lewis Hamilton	Mercedes	1:42.455	1:40.577	1:40.126	5
6	77	(Finland) Valtteri Bottas	Mercedes	1:43.137	1:41.409	1:40.810	6
7	27	(Germany) Nico Hülkenberg	Renault	1:42.586	1:41.277	1:41.013	7
8	14	(Spain) Fernando Alonso	McLaren-Honda	1:42.086	1:41.442	1:41.179	8
9	2	(Belgium) Stoffel Vandoorne	McLaren-Honda	1:42.222	1:41.227	1:41.398	9
10	55	(Spain) Carlos Sainz Jr.	Toro Rosso	1:42.176	1:41.826	1:42.056	10
11	30	(United Kingdom) Jolyon Palmer	Renault	1:42.472	1:42.107		11
12	11	(Mexico) Sergio Pérez	Force India-Mercedes	1:43.594	1:42.246		12
13	26	(Russia) Daniil Kvyat	Toro Rosso	1:42.544	1:42.338		13
14	31	(France) Esteban Ocon	Force India-Mercedes	1:43.626	1:42.760		14
15	8	(France) Romain Grosjean	Haas-Ferrari	1:43.627	1:43.883		15
16	20	(Denmark) Kevin Magnussen	Haas-Ferrari	1:43.756			16
17	19	(Brazil) Felipe Massa	Williams-Mercedes	1:44.014			17
18	18	(Canada) Lance Stroll	Williams-Mercedes	1:44.728			18
19	94	(Germany) Pascal Wehrlein	Sauber-Ferrari	1:45.059			19
20	9	(Sweden) Marcus Ericsson	Sauber-Ferrari	1:45.570			20^{1}
107% time: 1:49.150

Notes

- ^1 – Marcus Ericsson received a 5-place grid penalty for an unscheduled gearbox change.

=== Race ===
Pos.	No.	Driver	Constructor	Laps	Time/Retired	Grid	Points
1	44	(United Kingdom) Lewis Hamilton	Mercedes	58	2:03:23.544	5	25
2	3	(Australia) Daniel Ricciardo	Red Bull Racing-TAG Heuer	58	+4.507	3	18
3	77	(Finland) Valtteri Bottas	Mercedes	58	+8.800	6	15
4	55	(Spain) Carlos Sainz Jr.	Toro Rosso	58	+22.822	10	12
5	11	(Mexico) Sergio Pérez	Force India-Mercedes	58	+25.359	12	10
6	30	(United Kingdom) Jolyon Palmer	Renault	58	+27.259	11	8
7	2	(Belgium) Stoffel Vandoorne	McLaren-Honda	58	+30.388	9	6
8	18	(Canada) Lance Stroll	Williams-Mercedes	58	+41.696	18	4
9	8	(France) Romain Grosjean	Haas-Ferrari	58	+43.282	15	2
10	31	(France) Esteban Ocon	Force India-Mercedes	58	+44.795	14	1
11	19	(Brazil) Felipe Massa	Williams-Mercedes	58	+46.536	17	
12	94	(Germany) Pascal Wehrlein	Sauber-Ferrari	56	+2 laps	19	
Ret	20	(Denmark) Kevin Magnussen	Haas-Ferrari	50	Engine	16	
Ret	27	(Germany) Nico Hülkenberg	Renault	48	Oil leak	7	
Ret	9	(Sweden) Marcus Ericsson	Sauber-Ferrari	35	Accident	20	
Ret	26	(Russia) Daniil Kvyat	Toro Rosso	10	Accident	13	
Ret	14	(Spain) Fernando Alonso	McLaren-Honda	8	Collision damage	8	
Ret	5	(Germany) Sebastian Vettel	Ferrari	0	Collision damage	1	
Ret	33	(Netherlands) Max Verstappen	Red Bull Racing-TAG Heuer	0	Collision	2	
Ret	7	(Finland) Kimi Räikkönen	Ferrari	0	Collision	4	

== Championship standings after the race ==
Drivers' Championship standings

Pos.	Driver	Points
1	(United Kingdom) Lewis Hamilton	263
2	(Germany) Sebastian Vettel	235
3	(Finland) Valtteri Bottas	212
4	(Australia) Daniel Ricciardo	162
5	(Finland) Kimi Räikkönen	138

Constructors' Championship standings

Pos.	Constructor	Points
1	(Germany) Mercedes	475
2	(Italy) Ferrari	373
3	(Austria) Red Bull Racing-TAG Heuer	230
4	Force India-Mercedes	124
5	(United Kingdom) Williams-Mercedes	59

- Note: Only the top five positions are included for both sets of standings.

Previous race: 2017 Italian Grand Prix	FIA Formula One World Championship; 2017 season	Next race: 2017 Malaysian Grand Prix
Previous race: 2016 Singapore Grand Prix	Singapore Grand Prix	Next race: 2018 Singapore Grand Prix
