= 2017 Formula One World Championship =

68th season of FIA Formula One World Championship

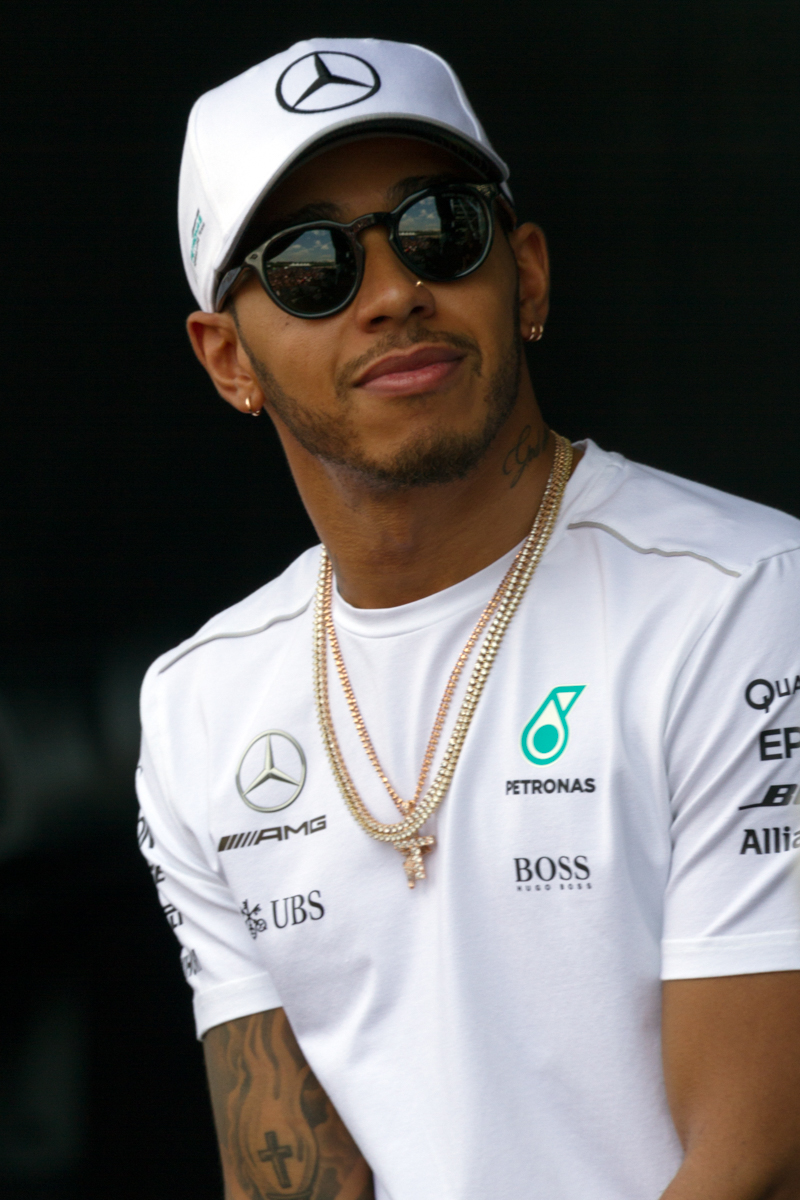
Mercedes' Lewis Hamilton won his fourth of seven Drivers' Championships.

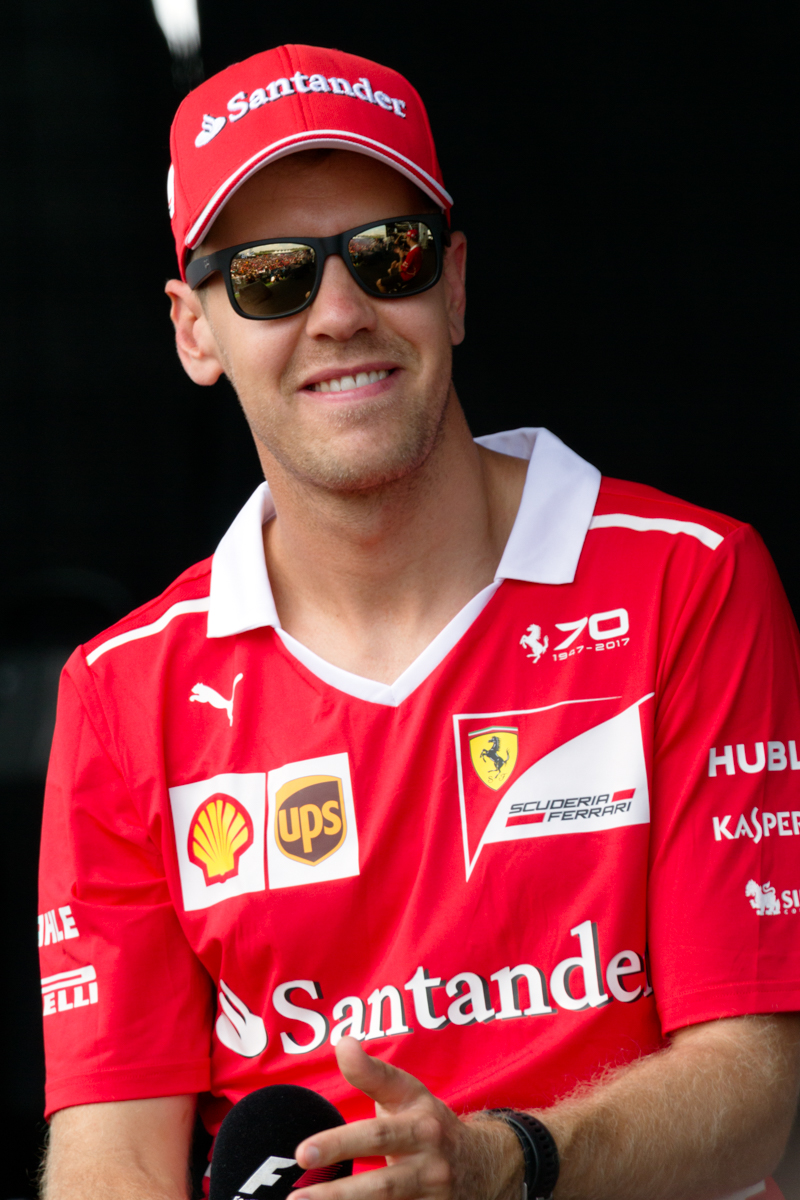
Four-time Champion Sebastian Vettel of Ferrari was runner-up.

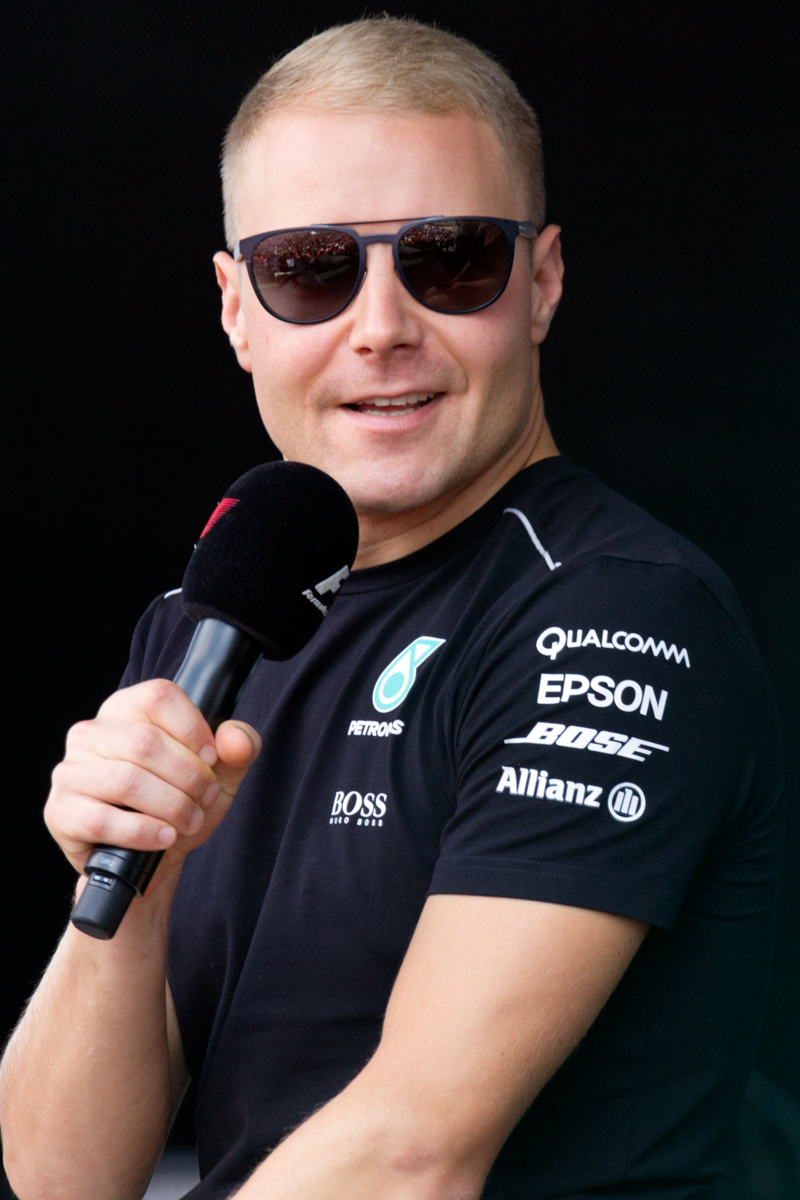
Valtteri Bottas finished third in his first year at Mercedes.

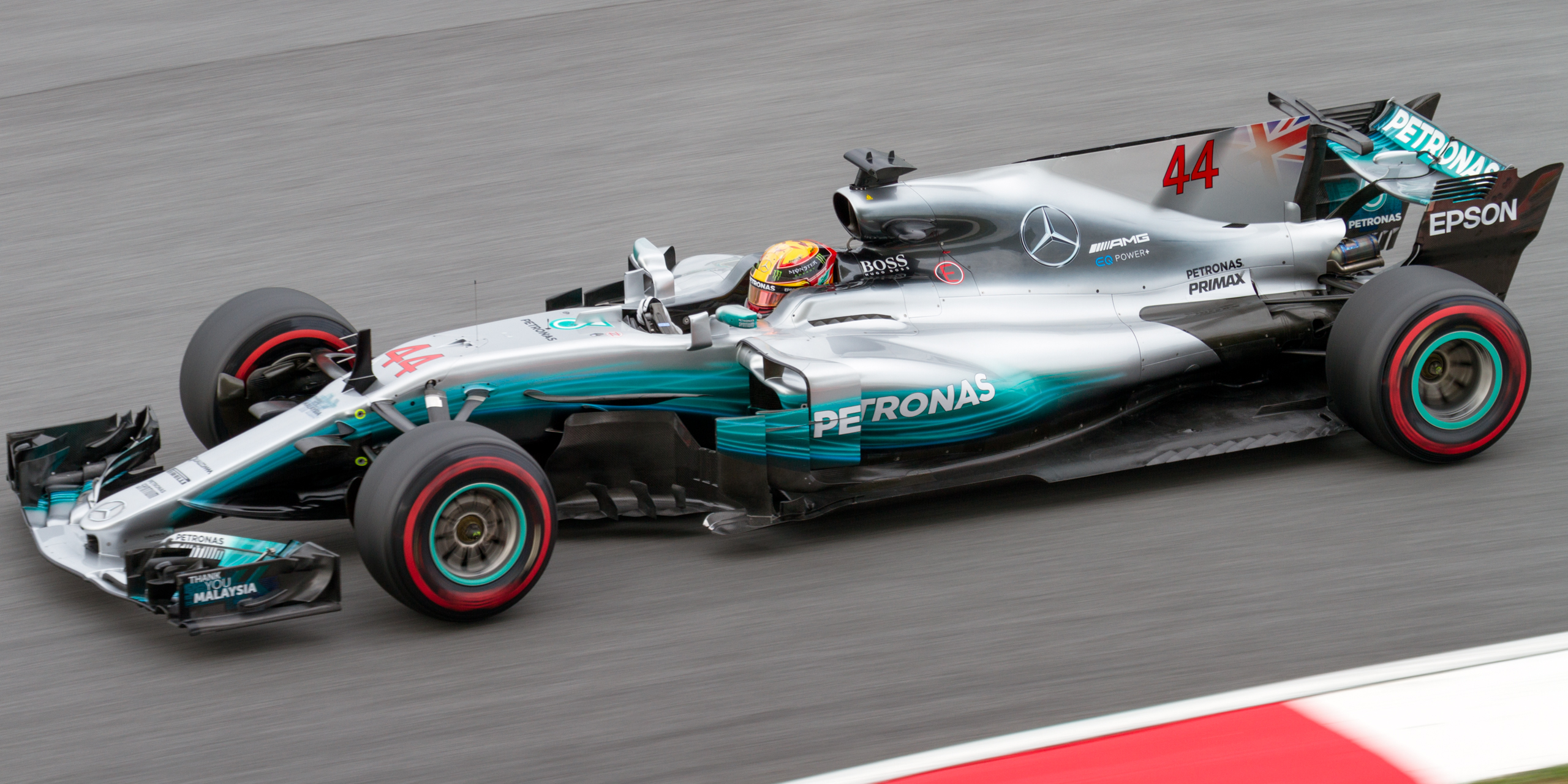
Mercedes retained the Constructors' Championship for a fourth consecutive year.

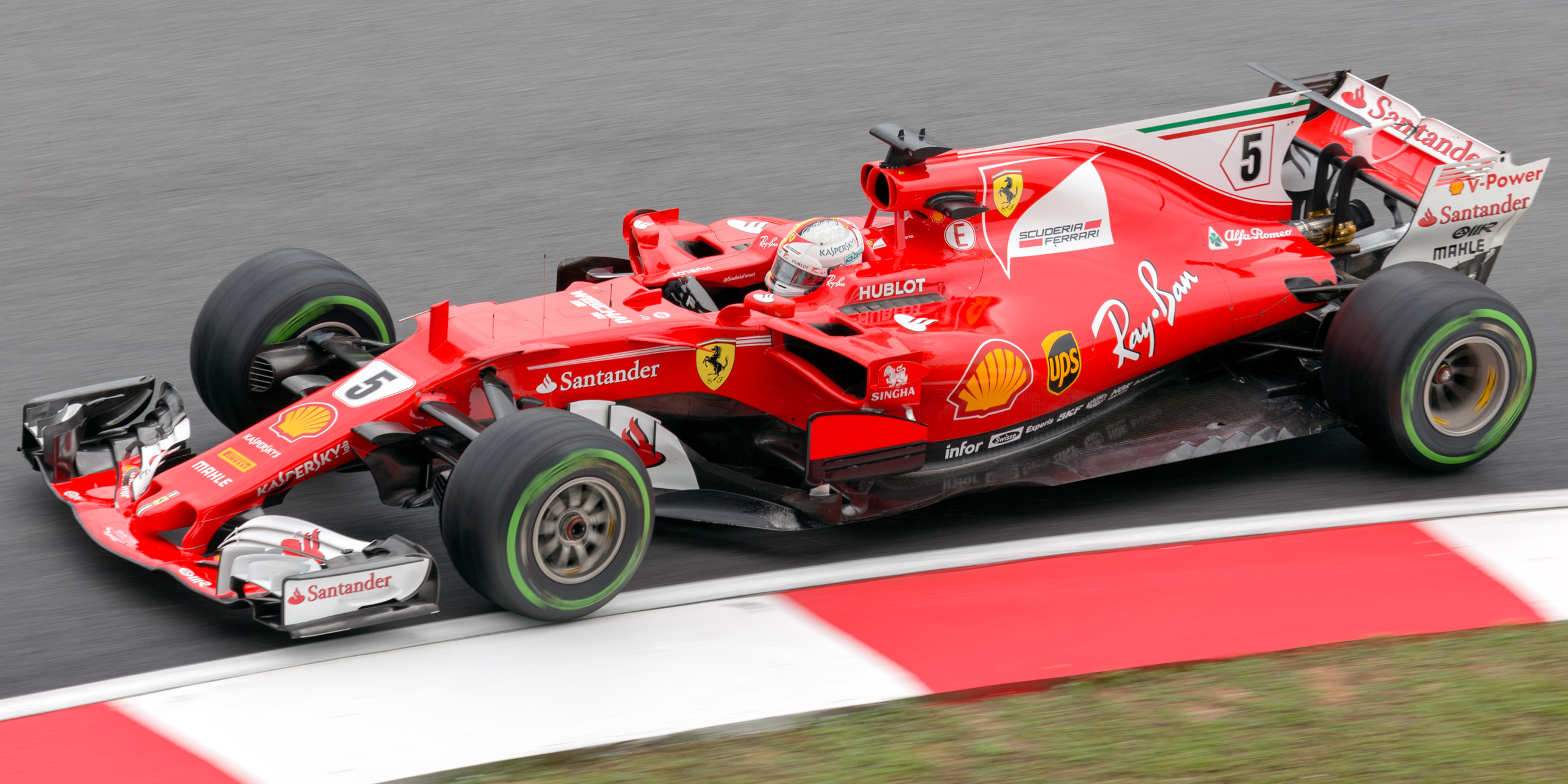
Ferrari finished second in the Constructors' Championship.

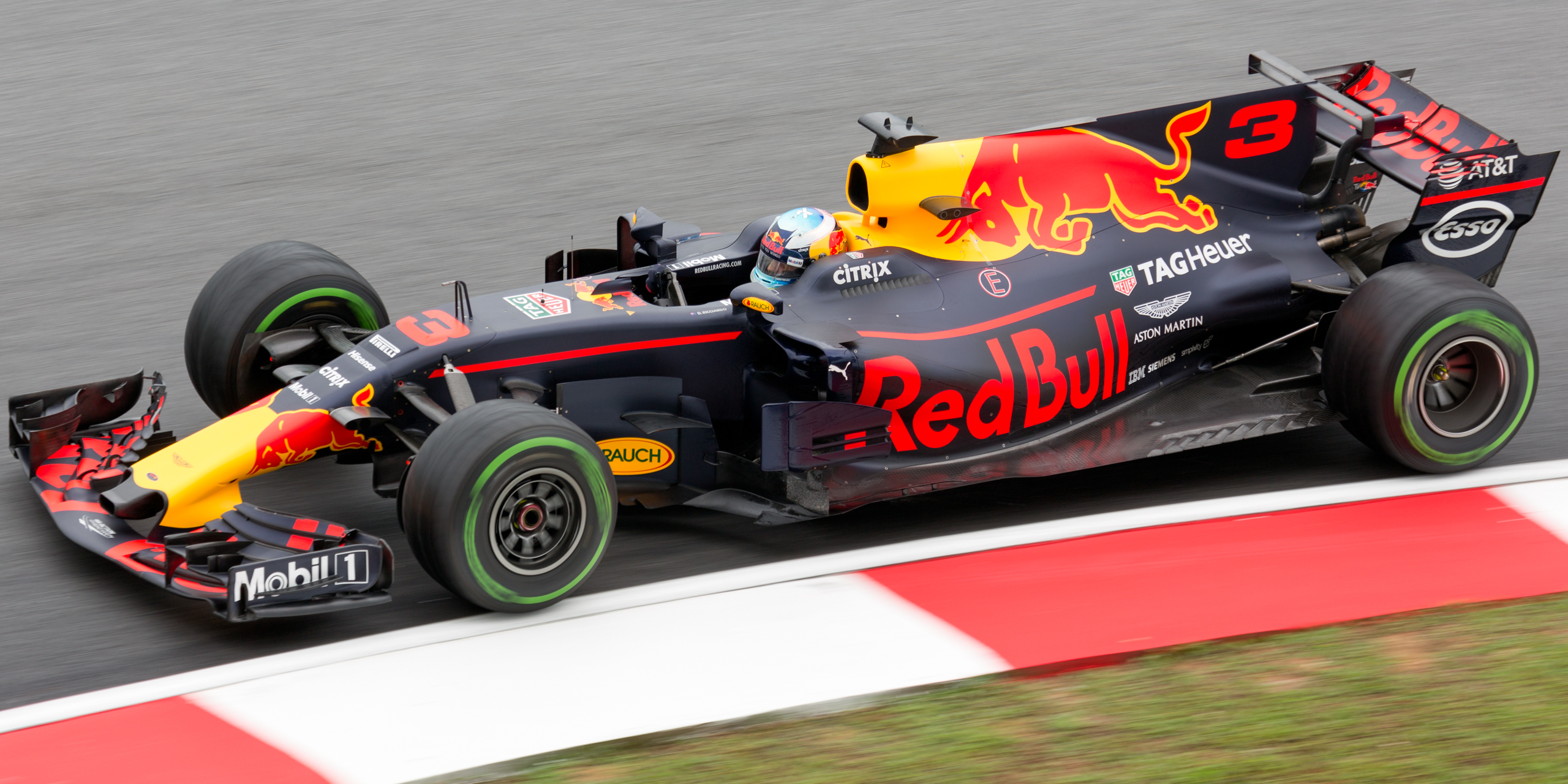
Red Bull Racing finished third in the Constructors' Championship.

The 2017 FIA Formula One World Championship was the 71st season of Formula One motor racing. It featured the 68th Formula One World Championship, a motor racing championship for Formula One cars which is recognised by the sport's governing body, the Fédération Internationale de l'Automobile (FIA), as the highest class of competition for open-wheel racing cars. Teams and drivers competed in twenty Grands Prix—starting in Australia on 26 March and ending in Abu Dhabi on 26 November—for the World Drivers' and World Constructors' championships.

The reigning Drivers' Champion Nico Rosberg was originally due to drive for Mercedes in 2017. He announced his retirement from the sport in December 2016, 5 days after winning his first drivers' World Championship at the 2016 Abu Dhabi Grand Prix, so the 2017 season was the first since 1994 in which the reigning champion did not compete. Mercedes started the season as the defending Constructors' Champion, having secured their third consecutive title at the 2016 Japanese Grand Prix.

2017 was the first genuine inter-team title battle for five years, since Fernando Alonso battled Sebastian Vettel for the title in 2012. Lewis Hamilton and Mercedes had to contend with a resurgent Ferrari team with their lead driver, 4 time world champion, Sebastian Vettel heading the championship for the first 12 rounds and challenging deep into the twenty race season. At the conclusion of the championship, Hamilton won his fourth World Drivers' Championship title. Hamilton finished 46 points ahead of Sebastian Vettel in second with 317 points and Valtteri Bottas in third with 305 points. In the World Constructors' Championship, Mercedes won their fourth consecutive title at the 2017 United States Grand Prix and finished with 668 points. Ferrari finished second with 522 points and Red Bull Racing were third with 368 points.

== Teams and drivers ==
The following teams and drivers took part in the 2017 Formula One World Championship. All teams competed with tyres supplied by Pirelli.

Entrant	Constructor	Chassis	Power unit	Race drivers		
Entrant	Constructor	Chassis	Power unit	No.	Driver name	Rounds
(Italy) Scuderia Ferrari	Ferrari	SF70H	Ferrari 062	5; 7	(Germany) Sebastian Vettel (Finland) Kimi Räikkönen	All; All
Sahara Force India F1 Team	Force India-Mercedes	VJM10	Mercedes M08 EQ Power+	11; 31	(Mexico) Sergio Pérez (France) Esteban Ocon	All; All
(United States) Haas F1 Team	Haas-Ferrari	VF-17	Ferrari 062	8; 20	(France) Romain Grosjean (Denmark) Kevin Magnussen	All; All
(United Kingdom) McLaren Honda Formula 1 Team	McLaren-Honda	MCL32	Honda RA617H	2; 14; 22	(Belgium) Stoffel Vandoorne (Spain) Fernando Alonso (United Kingdom) Jenson Button	All; 1–5, 7–20; 6
(Germany) Mercedes AMG Petronas F1 Team	Mercedes	F1 W08 EQ Power+	Mercedes M08 EQ Power+	44; 77	(United Kingdom) Lewis Hamilton (Finland) Valtteri Bottas	All; All
(Austria) Red Bull Racing	Red Bull Racing-TAG Heuer	RB13	TAG Heuer F1-2017 (Note: Red Bull Racing used Renault R.E.17 power units. For sponsorship purposes, these engines were rebadged as "TAG Heuer".)	3; 33	(Australia) Daniel Ricciardo (Netherlands) Max Verstappen	All; All
(France) Renault Sport Formula One Team	Renault	R.S.17	Renault R.E.17	27; 30; 55	(Germany) Nico Hülkenberg (United Kingdom) Jolyon Palmer (Spain) Carlos Sainz Jr.	All; 1–16; 17–20
(Switzerland) Sauber F1 Team	Sauber-Ferrari	C36	Ferrari 061	9; 94; 36	(Sweden) Marcus Ericsson (Germany) Pascal Wehrlein (Italy) Antonio Giovinazzi	All; 1, 3–20 (Note: Pascal Wehrlein was entered for the Australian Grand Prix but withdrew after taking part in free practice.); 1–2
(Italy) Scuderia Toro Rosso	Toro Rosso	STR12	Toro Rosso (Note: Scuderia Toro Rosso used Renault R.E.17 power units. For sponsorship purposes, these engines were rebadged as "Toro Rosso".)	26; 10; 39; 28; 55; 26; 10	(Russia) Daniil Kvyat (France) Pierre Gasly (New Zealand) Brendon Hartley (New Zealand) Brendon Hartley (Note: Brendon Hartley was entered in the United States Grand Prix as a replacement driver for Pierre Gasly and so carried the number 39 as it had been assigned to the team as a reserve number. With his entry in the next round in Mexico, Hartley became a regular driver and was entitled to choose his own number.) (Spain) Carlos Sainz Jr. (Russia) Daniil Kvyat (Note: When Daniil Kvyat raced for Toro Rosso for the United States Grand Prix, he drove the car that Carlos Sainz Jr. had previously competed in rather than the car he had driven in the first fourteen rounds of the championship.) (France) Pierre Gasly (Note: When Pierre Gasly raced for Toro Rosso for the Mexican Grand Prix and the subsequent races, he drove the car that Carlos Sainz Jr. and Daniil Kvyat had previously competed in rather than the car he had driven in the fifteenth and sixteenth round of the championship.)	1–14; 15–16; 17; 18–20; 1–16; 17; 18–20
(United Kingdom) Williams Martini Racing	Williams-Mercedes	FW40	Mercedes M08 EQ Power+	18; 19; 40	(Canada) Lance Stroll (Brazil) Felipe Massa (United Kingdom) Paul di Resta	All; All (Note: Felipe Massa was entered for the Hungarian Grand Prix but withdrew after taking part in free practice.); 11

=== Free practice drivers ===
Six drivers drove as free practice drivers over the course of the season.

Drivers that took part in a free practice session
Constructor	Practice drivers		
Constructor	No.	Driver name	Rounds
Force India-Mercedes	34; 35	(Mexico) Alfonso Celis Jr. (United Kingdom) George Russell	9, 11, 18; 19–20
Haas-Ferrari	50	(Italy) Antonio Giovinazzi	10–11, 14–15, 18–20
Renault	46	(Russia) Sergey Sirotkin	4–5, 9, 15
Sauber-Ferrari	37	(Monaco) Charles Leclerc	15, 17–19
Toro Rosso-Renault	38	(Indonesia) Sean Gelael	14–15, 17–18

=== Team changes ===
- Just Racing, the parent company of MRT, went into administration in January 2017. The company collapsed later that same month, ultimately closing down entirely in March after administrators were unable to find a buyer for MRT.
- Sauber used one-year-old Ferrari power units in 2017, mirroring the arrangement between Ferrari and Scuderia Toro Rosso in 2016.
- Toro Rosso returned to using Renault power units (badged with their own name) in 2017, having used 2015-specification Ferrari power units in 2016. The team had previously used Renault power units in 2014 and 2015 before the relationship between Renault and sister team Red Bull Racing broke down, prompting Toro Rosso to seek out an alternative supplier.

=== Driver changes ===
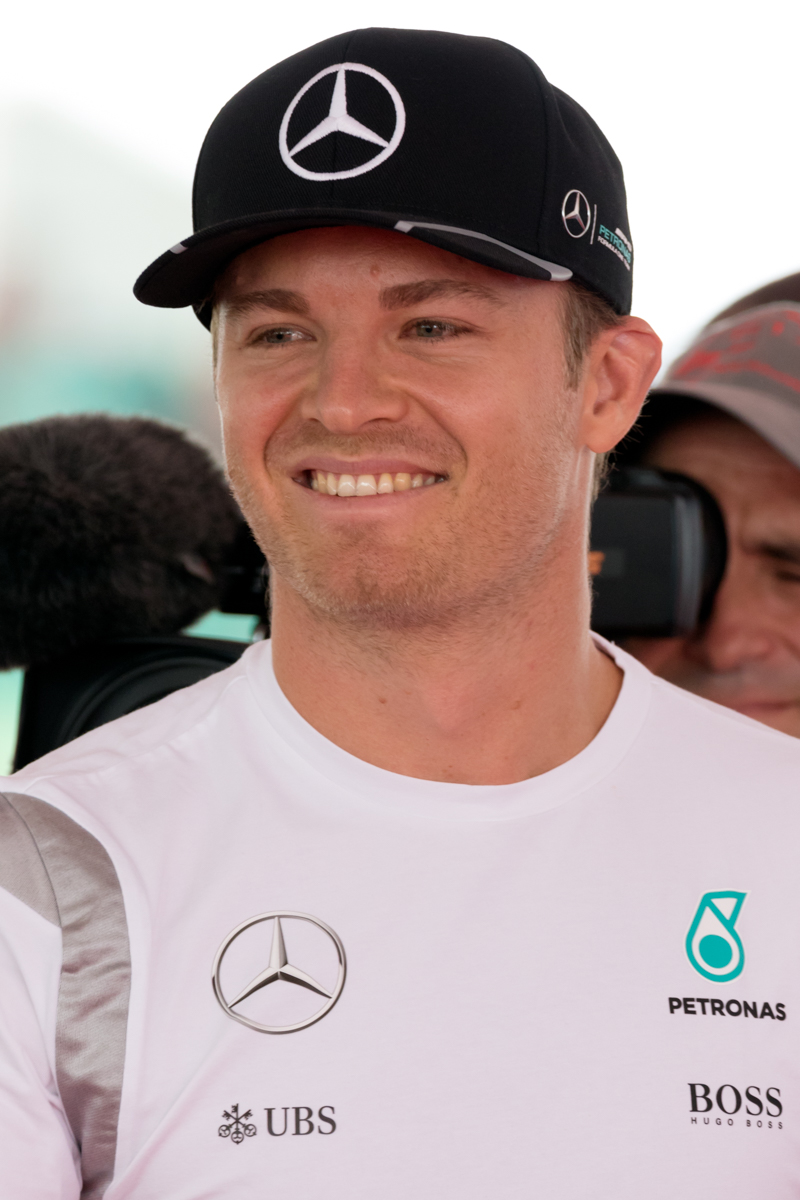
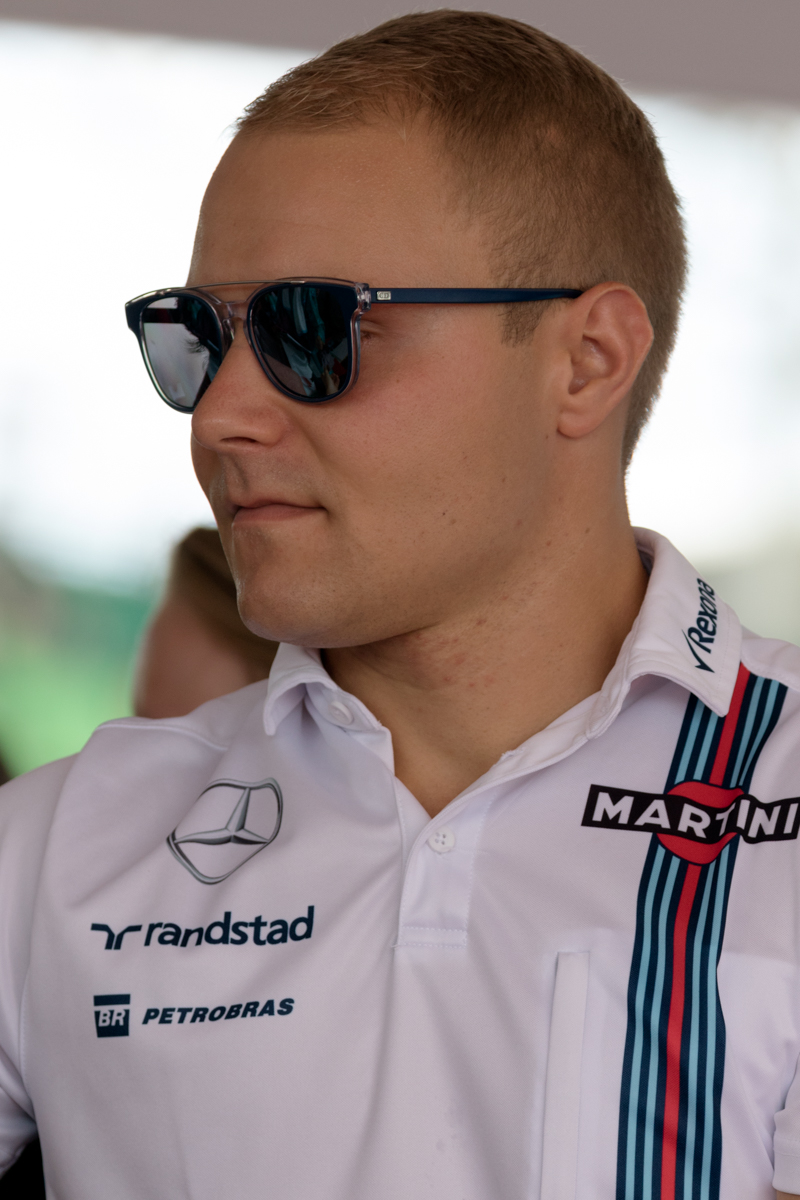
Nico Rosberg (pictured left) retired from Formula One shortly after winning the 2016 World Drivers' Championship. His place at Mercedes was taken by Valtteri Bottas (right).
- Kevin Magnussen turned down an offer to stay with Renault and instead signed a deal with Haas to drive alongside Romain Grosjean. As a result of the agreement with Magnussen and the team's decision to take up an option on Grosjean, Esteban Gutiérrez's contract with the team was not renewed. Gutiérrez later moved to the Formula E championship.
- Esteban Ocon moved from MRT to Force India, filling the seat left vacant by Nico Hülkenberg's departure to Renault.
- Reigning champion and Mercedes driver Nico Rosberg announced his shock retirement from the sport at the end of the 2016 season, ending his Formula One career after 11 seasons when he clinched the title in Abu Dhabi. Valtteri Bottas was released by Williams after a $10 million buyout was agreed with Mercedes to sign Bottas as Rosberg's replacement. 2008 runner-up Felipe Massa, who had intended to retire from Formula One at the end of the 2016 season, extended his contract with Williams by a year to replace his former teammate. Massa was partnered by 2016 European Formula 3 Championship winner Lance Stroll, who was originally hired by the team to replace Massa.
- 2015 GP2 Series champion Stoffel Vandoorne joined McLaren as a full-time driver. Vandoorne previously competed in one race for the team, substituting for the injured Fernando Alonso at the 2016 Bahrain Grand Prix. Vandoorne replaced Jenson Button, who took a sabbatical from racing in 2017 while staying on with the team as a reserve driver.
- Pascal Wehrlein moved from the now-defunct MRT to replace Felipe Nasr at Sauber.
- Rio Haryanto was under contract to compete in 2017, but his contract was terminated after the 2016 German Grand Prix due to sponsorship issues.

=== Mid-season changes ===
- Sauber driver Pascal Wehrlein withdrew from the Australian Grand Prix as a precaution after an injury at the Race of Champions interrupted his training regimen, prompting concerns that he would not be able to cope with the greater physical demands placed on the drivers by the 2017 generation of cars. As such, 2016 GP2 Series runner-up Antonio Giovinazzi took over racing duties for Sauber. Wehrlein returned to competition at the Bahrain Grand Prix, with Giovinazzi resuming testing and reserve driving duties.
- Fernando Alonso did not contest the Monaco Grand Prix. Instead, he participated in the Indianapolis 500. Jenson Button, who was serving as team ambassador and reserve driver, replaced Alonso for the race.
- Paul di Resta replaced Felipe Massa for the Hungarian Grand Prix after Massa was taken ill after Free Practice.
- Jolyon Palmer was dropped by Renault after the Japanese Grand Prix. Carlos Sainz Jr., who was set to join Renault from 2018, left Toro Rosso early to replace him.
- In the final rounds of the championship, Toro Rosso rotated several drivers between their cars. Prior to the Malaysian Grand Prix, Daniil Kvyat was replaced by 2016 GP2 Series champion Pierre Gasly. After Sainz Jr. left the team for Renault, Kvyat returned as his replacement for the United States Grand Prix. Gasly was forced to miss this race as it clashed with the final round of his Super Formula Championship campaign. FIA World Endurance Championship driver and former Red Bull Junior Team member Brendon Hartley stood in for him. After the race, Kvyat was released from the team and from the Red Bull programme entirely, with Gasly returning to the team at the next race and Hartley being promoted to a regular race seat.

== Calendar ==
Nations that hosted a Grand Prix in 2017 are highlighted in green, with circuit locations marked with a black dot. Former host nations are shown in dark grey, and former host circuits are marked with a white dot.

The following twenty Grands Prix took place in 2017:

Round	Grand Prix	Circuit	Date
1	Australian Grand Prix	(Australia) Albert Park Circuit, Melbourne	26 March
2	Chinese Grand Prix	(China) Shanghai International Circuit, Shanghai	9 April
3	Bahrain Grand Prix	Bahrain International Circuit, Sakhir	16 April
4	Russian Grand Prix	(Russia) Sochi Autodrom, Sochi	30 April
5	Spanish Grand Prix	(Spain) Circuit de Barcelona-Catalunya, Montmeló	14 May
6	Monaco Grand Prix	Circuit de Monaco, Monte Carlo	28 May
7	Canadian Grand Prix	(Canada) Circuit Gilles Villeneuve, Montreal	11 June
8	Azerbaijan Grand Prix	(Azerbaijan) Baku City Circuit, Baku	25 June
9	Austrian Grand Prix	(Austria) Red Bull Ring, Spielberg	9 July
10	British Grand Prix	(United Kingdom) Silverstone Circuit, Silverstone	16 July
11	Hungarian Grand Prix	(Hungary) Hungaroring, Mogyoród	30 July
12	Belgian Grand Prix	(Belgium) Circuit de Spa-Francorchamps, Stavelot	27 August
13	Italian Grand Prix	(Italy) Autodromo Nazionale di Monza, Monza	3 September
14	Singapore Grand Prix	Marina Bay Street Circuit, Singapore	17 September
15	Malaysian Grand Prix	(Malaysia) Sepang International Circuit, Kuala Lumpur	1 October
16	Japanese Grand Prix	(Japan) Suzuka International Racing Course, Suzuka	8 October
17	United States Grand Prix	(United States) Circuit of the Americas, Austin, Texas	22 October
18	Mexican Grand Prix	Autódromo Hermanos Rodríguez, Mexico City	29 October
19	Brazilian Grand Prix	(Brazil) Autódromo José Carlos Pace, São Paulo	12 November
20	Abu Dhabi Grand Prix	(United Arab Emirates) Yas Marina Circuit, Abu Dhabi	26 November

=== Calendar changes ===
- The Baku event was renamed, becoming the first Azerbaijan Grand Prix. The previous race at the Baku City Circuit ran under the European Grand Prix title in 2016. The date of the race was changed to avoid conflicting with the 24 Hours of Le Mans, which had been a source of controversy at the 2016 European Grand Prix.
- The German Grand Prix was removed from the calendar in March after the owners of the Nürburgring pulled out of the event-sharing arrangement with the Hockenheimring to alternate between the two circuits. The owners of the Hockenheimring circuit were unwilling to organise a Grand Prix every year due to financial problems and were unable to agree to commercial terms with Formula One Management.

== Changes ==
=== General changes ===
- In September 2016, Liberty Media purchased a minority stake in the sport from CVC Capital Partners, and completed the purchase ahead of the 2017 season, with the long-term goal of adopting a model similar to that used by the U.S. National Football League and Major League Baseball, with teams entitled to purchase a stake in the sport. The commercial operation of the sport underwent a restructuring in January 2017, with Bernie Ecclestone leaving his position as chief executive of Formula One Group after forty years in the role. Former team principal Ross Brawn—who won World Championships with Ferrari and his own eponymous team—was appointed as managing director in Ecclestone's stead.
- With the acquisition of the sport by Liberty Media, teams were given more control over creating and uploading content to social media. Under Bernie Ecclestone's previous management, all footage filmed in the paddock was automatically controlled by Formula One Management with tight restrictions on the release of content.
- As a response to widespread changes in the technical regulations expected to increase cornering speeds by up to 40 km/h (24.9 mph), the FIA requested that every circuit on the calendar undergo revisions to update safety features.

=== Technical regulations ===
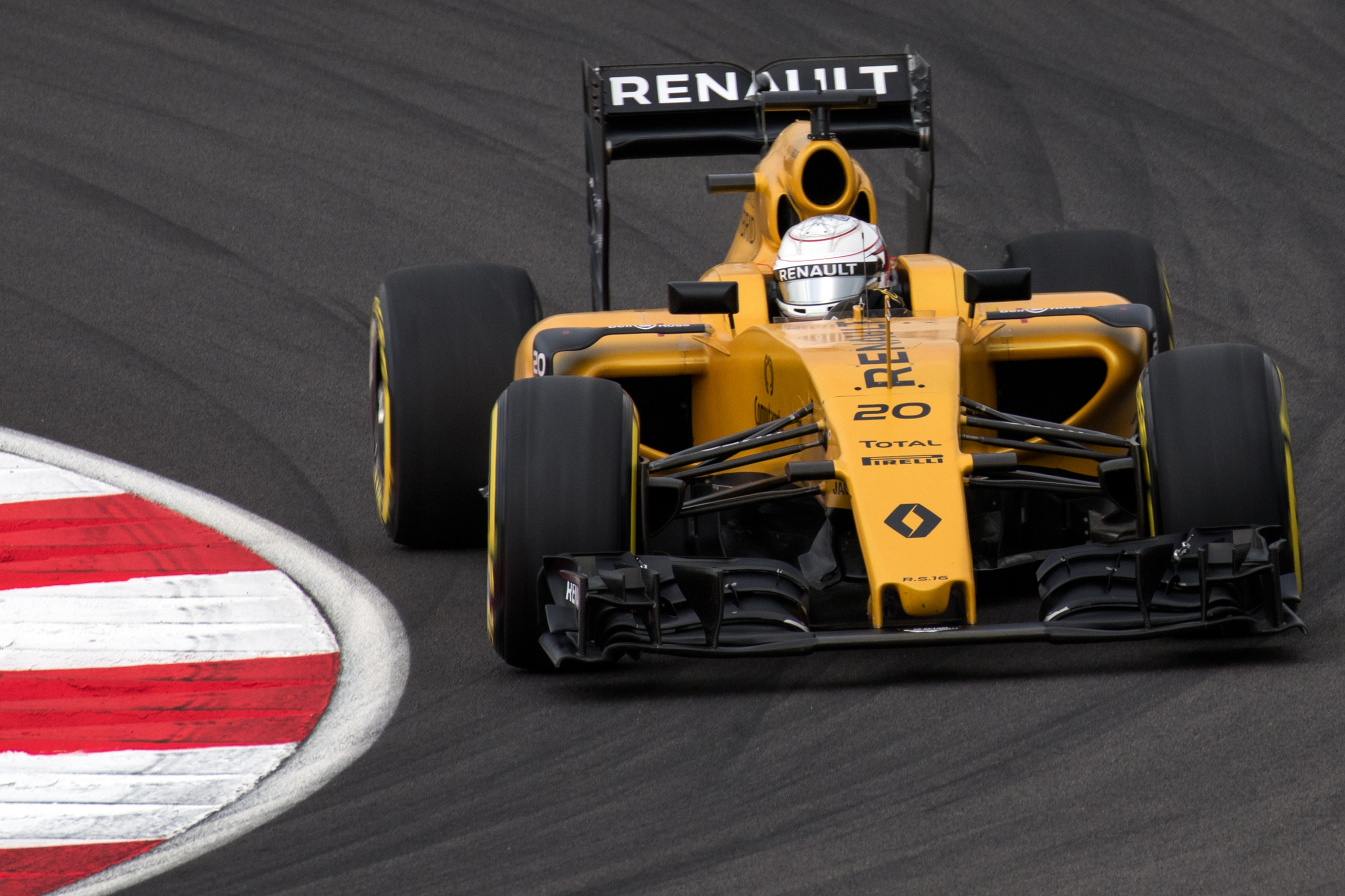

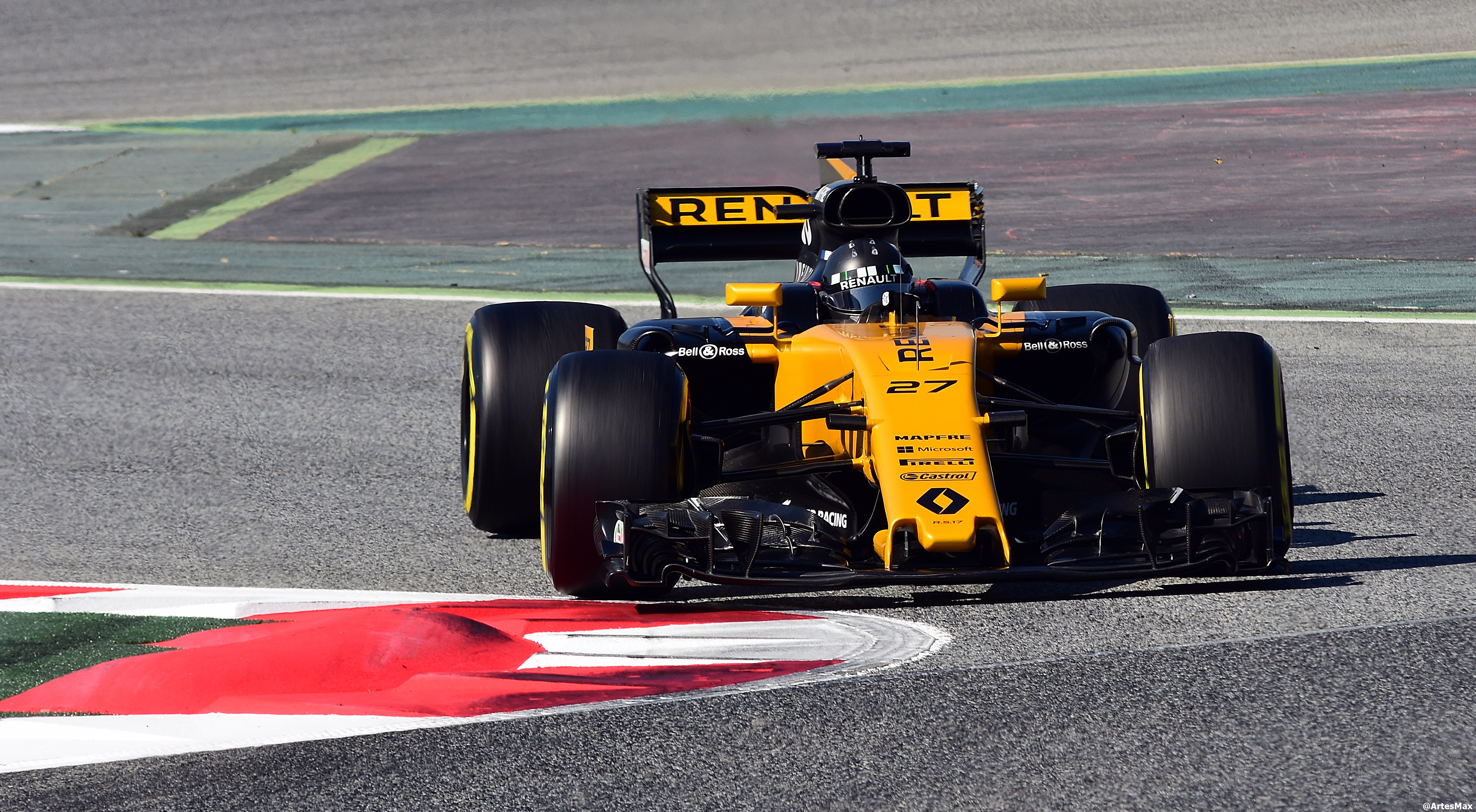
New technical regulations led to a significant change in car design of the new 2017 cars (Renault R.S.17 pictured, bottom) compared to their 2016 counterparts (Renault R.S.16 pictured, top).

- The technical regulations governing bodywork design were revised for 2017, with the objective of improving lap times by four to five seconds over the 2016 generation of cars. These changes include:
  - Overall width of the car increased from 1,800 to 2,000 mm (71 to 79 in).
  - Bodywork width increased from 1,400 to 1,600 mm (55 to 63 in).
  - Front wing width increased back from 1,650 to 1,800 mm (65 to 71 in).
  - Rear wing lowered by 150 mm (6 in), from 950 to 800 mm (37 to 31 in), and moved backwards by 200 mm (8 in).
  - Rear diffuser height increased from 125 to 175 mm (5 to 7 in) and width increased from 1,000 to 1,050 mm (39 to 41 in), and leading edge moved from the rear wheel centre line to 175 mm (7 in) in front of it.
  - The leading edge of the barge boards was brought forward to allow teams more freedom in controlling airflow.
  - Tyre width increased by 25% to allow cars to generate more mechanical grip. Front tyre width increased from 245 to 305 mm (9.6 to 12.0 in) and rear tyre width increased from 325 to 405 mm (12.8 to 15.9 in). The tyre diameters (front and rear) were also slightly increased from 660 to 670 mm (26.0 to 26.4 in).
  - The minimum weight of the car including the driver was raised by 26 kg (57 lb), from 702 to 728 kg (1,548 to 1,605 lb).
  - Maximum fuel consumed increased from 100 to 105 kg (220 to 231 lb) to account for the heavier, wider, and faster cornering cars.
- 2017 saw teams adopt the "T-wing", a thin T-shaped wing mounted to the bodywork above and forward of the rear wing to generate additional downforce. Its creation prompted concerns about the use of moveable aerodynamic devices—forbidden under the rules—after several T-wings were observed to be vibrating during pre-season testing. However, the stewards chose to review the use of T-wings on a case-by-case basis rather than issue a technical directive. The usage of T-wings, along with Shark fins would later be banned in the following season.
- The token system used to regulate power unit development—where the power unit was divided into individual areas, and each area assigned a points value with development of these areas deducting points from a manufacturer's overall points quota—will be abandoned.
- Restrictions are to be placed on the dimensions, weight and the materials used to build each individual component of the power unit.
- Teams are restricted to four power units per season regardless of the number of Grands Prix in the season. Previous seasons had included a provision for a fifth power unit if the number of Grands Prix in a season exceeded twenty; from 2017, this provision is to be abandoned.
- The cost of a power unit supply is reduced by €1 million in 2017 ahead of a further reduction in 2018.
- Cameras are no longer permitted to be mounted on stalks located on the nose of the car.
- Pirelli continued to be Formula One's sole tyre partner and supplier in 2017, beating out a bid by Michelin to provide tyres for the championship. Continuing from previous seasons, the company offered a range of seven different tyre compounds, five for dry and two for wet conditions. While both wet compounds are available for every Grand Prix, only a choice of three dry compounds are made available to teams for a single race weekend. As in the previous season, teams are allowed to choose ten out of thirteen sets of tyres for a race weekend freely from the three compounds made available by Pirelli. However, due to limited testing time for the new compounds during the winter break, Pirelli chose to provide teams with a mandatory number of sets for the first five races.

=== Sporting regulations ===
- Under rules introduced in 2015, grid penalties for exceeding a driver's quota of power unit components carried over from one race to the next if the penalty could not be fully served when issued. When this carry-over system was abandoned, teams could build up a reserve of spare components by introducing several at once while only serving a single grid penalty. From 2017, teams will only be able to use one new component over their quota per race, with any additional components incurring further penalties. This change prevents teams from "stockpiling" spare power unit components.
- Power unit suppliers will have an "obligation to supply", mandating that they supply power units to any team, should a team end up without an agreement. The rule was introduced following the breakdown in the relationship between Renault and their customer teams Red Bull Racing and Scuderia Toro Rosso at the end of the 2015 season that left both teams in limbo until deals could be arranged.
- In the event that a race is declared wet and must start behind the safety car, the grid will follow normal starting procedures once conditions are declared satisfactory for racing. Drivers will line up on the grid for a standing start once the safety car pulls into pit lane, although any laps completed behind the safety car will still count towards the total race distance.
- The FIA abandoned the rule governing driving standards under braking, in lieu of an all-encompassing rule against manoeuvres that could endanger other drivers. The rule was introduced in 2016 amid criticism of Max Verstappen for his habit of changing direction before braking late to defend his position, which led to concerns that such aggressive defensive driving could trigger an accident.
- Starting from the Spanish Grand Prix, teams were required to display a driver's name and racing number on the external bodywork of the car in such a way that they are clearly visible to spectators. Teams have the option to use the official timing screen abbreviation; for example HAM (Hamilton) and VET (Vettel).

== Season report ==
For most of its run, the season was defined by a duel between Hamilton and Vettel as title contenders. Hamilton was looking to regain the World Championship after losing it to teammate Nico Rosberg the year before and win his fourth title overall, while Vettel was looking to capture his first since 2013 by breaking the Mercedes dominance established since 2014, and his fifth overall.

The start of the season was tight between the title contenders, with various analysts describing the Ferrari SF70H as initially the more consistent car in race trim. Sebastian Vettel led the championship for the first 12 rounds (more than half the season) but never by more than 25 points. Vettel's loss of self‑control when he chose to barge Hamilton in Baku was the most incendiary incident between the pair, in a season in which there was a friendly mutual respect. However, Ferrari's challenge faltered towards the end of the season, with a setback at Singapore, where the two Ferraris collided. Before this, both contenders were close in points. Hamilton won Singapore and gained a lead that swelled with Ferrari's technical problems in Malaysia and Japan.They went though technical issues for the races after. Losing Singapore and Malaysia, which they were forecasted to win, cost them vital points in both championships. Lewis Hamilton took the title at the Mexican Grand Prix with 2 races still to go.

== Results and standings ==
=== Grands Prix ===
Round	Grand Prix	Pole position	Fastest lap	Winning driver	Winning constructor	Report
1	(Australia) Australian Grand Prix	(United Kingdom) Lewis Hamilton	(Finland) Kimi Räikkönen	(Germany) Sebastian Vettel	(Italy) Ferrari	Report
2	(China) Chinese Grand Prix	(United Kingdom) Lewis Hamilton	(United Kingdom) Lewis Hamilton	(United Kingdom) Lewis Hamilton	(Germany) Mercedes	Report
3	Bahrain Grand Prix	(Finland) Valtteri Bottas	(United Kingdom) Lewis Hamilton	(Germany) Sebastian Vettel	(Italy) Ferrari	Report
4	(Russia) Russian Grand Prix	(Germany) Sebastian Vettel	(Finland) Kimi Räikkönen	(Finland) Valtteri Bottas	(Germany) Mercedes	Report
5	(Spain) Spanish Grand Prix	(United Kingdom) Lewis Hamilton	(United Kingdom) Lewis Hamilton	(United Kingdom) Lewis Hamilton	(Germany) Mercedes	Report
6	Monaco Grand Prix	(Finland) Kimi Räikkönen	(Mexico) Sergio Pérez	(Germany) Sebastian Vettel	(Italy) Ferrari	Report
7	(Canada) Canadian Grand Prix	(United Kingdom) Lewis Hamilton	(United Kingdom) Lewis Hamilton	(United Kingdom) Lewis Hamilton	(Germany) Mercedes	Report
8	Azerbaijan Grand Prix	(United Kingdom) Lewis Hamilton	(Germany) Sebastian Vettel	(Australia) Daniel Ricciardo	(Austria) Red Bull Racing-TAG Heuer	Report
9	(Austria) Austrian Grand Prix	(Finland) Valtteri Bottas	(United Kingdom) Lewis Hamilton	(Finland) Valtteri Bottas	(Germany) Mercedes	Report
10	(United Kingdom) British Grand Prix	(United Kingdom) Lewis Hamilton	(United Kingdom) Lewis Hamilton	(United Kingdom) Lewis Hamilton	(Germany) Mercedes	Report
11	(Hungary) Hungarian Grand Prix	(Germany) Sebastian Vettel	(Spain) Fernando Alonso	(Germany) Sebastian Vettel	(Italy) Ferrari	Report
12	(Belgium) Belgian Grand Prix	(United Kingdom) Lewis Hamilton	(Germany) Sebastian Vettel	(United Kingdom) Lewis Hamilton	(Germany) Mercedes	Report
13	(Italy) Italian Grand Prix	(United Kingdom) Lewis Hamilton	(Australia) Daniel Ricciardo	(United Kingdom) Lewis Hamilton	(Germany) Mercedes	Report
14	Singapore Grand Prix	(Germany) Sebastian Vettel	(United Kingdom) Lewis Hamilton	(United Kingdom) Lewis Hamilton	(Germany) Mercedes	Report
15	(Malaysia) Malaysian Grand Prix	(United Kingdom) Lewis Hamilton	(Germany) Sebastian Vettel	(Netherlands) Max Verstappen	(Austria) Red Bull Racing-TAG Heuer	Report
16	(Japan) Japanese Grand Prix	(United Kingdom) Lewis Hamilton	(Finland) Valtteri Bottas	(United Kingdom) Lewis Hamilton	(Germany) Mercedes	Report
17	United States Grand Prix	(United Kingdom) Lewis Hamilton	(Germany) Sebastian Vettel	(United Kingdom) Lewis Hamilton	(Germany) Mercedes	Report
18	(Mexico) Mexican Grand Prix	(Germany) Sebastian Vettel	(Germany) Sebastian Vettel	(Netherlands) Max Verstappen	(Austria) Red Bull Racing-TAG Heuer	Report
19	(Brazil) Brazilian Grand Prix	(Finland) Valtteri Bottas	(Netherlands) Max Verstappen	(Germany) Sebastian Vettel	(Italy) Ferrari	Report
20	(United Arab Emirates) Abu Dhabi Grand Prix	(Finland) Valtteri Bottas	(Finland) Valtteri Bottas	(Finland) Valtteri Bottas	(Germany) Mercedes	Report

=== Scoring system ===
Points were awarded to the top ten classified finishers in every race, using the following structure:

Position	1st	2nd	3rd	4th	5th	6th	7th	8th	9th	10th
Points	25	18	15	12	10	8	6	4	2	1

In order for full points to be awarded, the race winner must completed at least 75% of the scheduled race distance. Half points were awarded if the race winner completes less than 75% of the race distance provided that at least two laps are completed. (Note: In the event that two laps cannot be completed, no points are awarded and the race is abandoned.) In the event of a tie at the conclusion of the championship, a count-back system was used as a tie-breaker, with a driver's best result used to decide the standings. (Note: In the event that two or more drivers or constructors achieve the same best result an equal number of times, their next-best result will be used. If two or more drivers or constructors achieve equal results an equal number of times, the FIA nominated the winner according to such criteria as it sees fit.)

=== World Drivers' Championship standings ===
Pos.	Driver	AUS (Australia)	CHN (China)	BHR (Bahrain)	RUS (Russia)	ESP (Spain)	MON (Monaco)	CAN (Canada)	AZE (Azerbaijan)	AUT (Austria)	GBR (United Kingdom)	HUN (Hungary)	BEL (Belgium)	ITA (Italy)	SIN (Singapore)	MAL (Malaysia)	JPN (Japan)	USA (United States)	MEX (Mexico)	BRA (Brazil)	ABU (United Arab Emirates)	Points
1	(United Kingdom) Lewis Hamilton	2^{P}	1^{P}^{F}	2^{F}	4	1^{P}^{F}	7	1^{P}^{F}	5^{P}	4^{F}	1^{P}^{F}	4	1^{P}	1^{P}	1^{F}	2^{P}	1^{P}	1^{P}	9	4	2	363
2	(Germany) Sebastian Vettel	1	2	1	2^{P}	2	1	4	4^{F}	2	7	1^{P}	2^{F}	3	Ret^{P}	4^{F}	Ret	2^{F}	4^{P}^{F}	1	3	317
3	(Finland) Valtteri Bottas	3	6	3^{P}	1	Ret	4	2	2	1^{P}	2	3	5	2	3	5	4^{F}	5	2	2^{P}	1^{P}^{F}	305
4	(Finland) Kimi Räikkönen	4^{F}	5	4	3^{F}	Ret	2^{P}	7	14†	5	3	2	4	5	Ret	DNS	5	3	3	3	4	205
5	(Australia) Daniel Ricciardo	Ret	4	5	Ret	3	3	3	1	3	5	Ret	3	4^{F}	2	3	3	Ret	Ret	6	Ret	200
6	(Netherlands) Max Verstappen	5	3	Ret	5	Ret	5	Ret	Ret	Ret	4	5	Ret	10	Ret	1	2	4	1	5^{F}	5	168
7	(Mexico) Sergio Pérez	7	9	7	6	4	13^{F}	5	Ret	7	9	8	17†	9	5	6	7	8	7	9	7	100
8	(France) Esteban Ocon	10	10	10	7	5	12	6	6	8	8	9	9	6	10	10	6	6	5	Ret	8	87
9	(Spain) Carlos Sainz Jr.	8	7	Ret	10	7	6	Ret	8	Ret	Ret	7	10	14	4	Ret	Ret	7	Ret	11	Ret	54
10	(Germany) Nico Hülkenberg	11	12	9	8	6	Ret	8	Ret	13	6	17†	6	13	Ret	16	Ret	Ret	Ret	10	6	43
11	(Brazil) Felipe Massa	6	14	6	9	13	9	Ret	Ret	9	10	WD	8	8	11	9	10	9	11	7	10	43
12	(Canada) Lance Stroll	Ret	Ret	Ret	11	16	15†	9	3	10	16	14	11	7	8	8	Ret	11	6	16	18	40
13	(France) Romain Grosjean	Ret	11	8	Ret	10	8	10	13	6	13	Ret	7	15	9	13	9	14	15	15	11	28
14	(Denmark) Kevin Magnussen	Ret	8	Ret	13	14	10	12	7	Ret	12	13	15	11	Ret	12	8	16	8	Ret	13	19
15	(Spain) Fernando Alonso	Ret	Ret	14†	DNS	12		16†	9	Ret	Ret	6^{F}	Ret	17†	Ret	11	11	Ret	10	8	9	17
16	(Belgium) Stoffel Vandoorne	13	Ret	DNS	14	Ret	Ret	14	12	12	11	10	14	Ret	7	7	14	12	12	Ret	12	13
17	(United Kingdom) Jolyon Palmer	Ret	13	13	Ret	15	11	11	Ret	11	DNS	12	13	Ret	6	15	12					8
18	(Germany) Pascal Wehrlein	WD		11	16	8	Ret	15	10	14	17	15	Ret	16	12	17	15	Ret	14	14	14	5
19	(Russia) Daniil Kvyat	9	Ret	12	12	9	14†	Ret	Ret	16	15	11	12	12	Ret			10				5
20	(Sweden) Marcus Ericsson	Ret	15	Ret	15	11	Ret	13	11	15	14	16	16	18†	Ret	18	Ret	15	Ret	13	17	0
21	(France) Pierre Gasly															14	13		13	12	16	0
22	(Italy) Antonio Giovinazzi	12	Ret																			0
23	(New Zealand) Brendon Hartley																	13	Ret	Ret	15	0
—	(United Kingdom) Jenson Button						Ret															0
—	(United Kingdom) Paul di Resta											Ret										0
Pos.	Driver	AUS (Australia)	CHN (China)	BHR (Bahrain)	RUS (Russia)	ESP (Spain)	MON (Monaco)	CAN (Canada)	AZE (Azerbaijan)	AUT (Austria)	GBR (United Kingdom)	HUN (Hungary)	BEL (Belgium)	ITA (Italy)	SIN (Singapore)	MAL (Malaysia)	JPN (Japan)	USA (United States)	MEX (Mexico)	BRA (Brazil)	ABU (United Arab Emirates)	Points

Key
Colour	Result
Gold	Winner
Silver	Second place
Bronze	Third place
Green	Other points position
Blue	Other classified position
Blue	Not classified, finished (NC)
Purple	Not classified, retired (Ret)
Red	Did not qualify (DNQ)
Black	Disqualified (DSQ)
White	Did not start (DNS)
White	Race cancelled (C)
Blank	Did not practice (DNP)
Blank	Excluded (EX)
Blank	Did not arrive (DNA)
Blank	Withdrawn (WD)
Blank	Did not enter (empty cell)
Annotation	Meaning
P	Pole position
F	Fastest lap

Notes:

- † – Drivers did not finish the Grand Prix, but were classified as they completed more than 90% of the race distance.

=== World Constructors' Championship standings ===
Pos.	Constructor	AUS (Australia)	CHN (China)	BHR (Bahrain)	RUS (Russia)	ESP (Spain)	MON (Monaco)	CAN (Canada)	AZE (Azerbaijan)	AUT (Austria)	GBR (United Kingdom)	HUN (Hungary)	BEL (Belgium)	ITA (Italy)	SIN (Singapore)	MAL (Malaysia)	JPN (Japan)	USA (United States)	MEX (Mexico)	BRA (Brazil)	ABU (United Arab Emirates)	Points
1	(Germany) Mercedes	2^{P}	1^{P}^{F}	2^{F}	1	1^{P}^{F}	4	1^{P}^{F}	2	1^{P}	1^{P}^{F}	3	1^{P}	1^{P}	1^{F}	2^{P}	1^{P}	1^{P}	2	2^{P}	1^{P}^{F}	668
1	(Germany) Mercedes	3	6	3^{P}	4	Ret	7	2	5^{P}	4^{F}	2	4	5	2	3	5	4^{F}	5	9	4	2	668
2	(Italy) Ferrari	1	2	1	2^{P}	2	1	4	4^{F}	2	3	1^{P}	2^{F}	3	Ret^{P}	4^{F}	5	2^{F}	3	1	3	522
2	(Italy) Ferrari	4^{F}	5	4	3^{F}	Ret	2^{P}	7	14†	5	7	2	4	5	Ret	DNS	Ret	3	4^{P}^{F}	3	4	522
3	(Austria) Red Bull Racing-TAG Heuer	5	3	5	5	3	3	3	1	3	4	5	3	4^{F}	2	1	2	4	1	5^{F}	5	368
3	(Austria) Red Bull Racing-TAG Heuer	Ret	4	Ret	Ret	Ret	5	Ret	Ret	Ret	5	Ret	Ret	10	Ret	3	3	Ret	Ret	6	Ret	368
4	Force India-Mercedes	7	9	7	6	4	12	5	6	7	8	8	9	6	5	6	6	6	5	9	7	187
4	Force India-Mercedes	10	10	10	7	5	13^{F}	6	Ret	8	9	9	17†	9	10	10	7	8	7	Ret	8	187
5	(United Kingdom) Williams-Mercedes	6	14	6	9	13	9	9	3	9	10	14	8	7	8	8	10	9	6	7	10	83
5	(United Kingdom) Williams-Mercedes	Ret	Ret	Ret	11	16	15†	Ret	Ret	10	16	Ret	11	8	11	9	Ret	11	11	16	18	83
6	(France) Renault	11	12	9	8	6	11	8	Ret	11	6	12	6	13	6	15	12	7	Ret	10	6	57
6	(France) Renault	Ret	13	13	Ret	15	Ret	11	Ret	13	DNS	17†	13	Ret	Ret	16	Ret	Ret	Ret	11	Ret	57
7	(Italy) Toro Rosso	8	7	12	10	7	6	Ret	8	16	15	7	10	12	4	14	13	10	13	12	15	53
7	(Italy) Toro Rosso	9	Ret	Ret	12	9	14†	Ret	Ret	Ret	Ret	11	12	14	Ret	Ret	Ret	13	Ret	Ret	16	53
8	(United States) Haas-Ferrari	Ret	8	8	13	10	8	10	7	6	12	13	7	11	9	12	8	14	8	Ret	11	47
8	(United States) Haas-Ferrari	Ret	11	Ret	Ret	14	10	12	13	Ret	13	Ret	15	15	Ret	13	9	16	15	15	13	47
9	(United Kingdom) McLaren-Honda	13	Ret	14†	14	12	Ret	14	9	12	11	6^{F}	14	17†	7	7	11	12	10	8	9	30
9	(United Kingdom) McLaren-Honda	Ret	Ret	DNS	DNS	Ret	Ret	16†	12	Ret	Ret	10	Ret	Ret	Ret	11	14	Ret	12	Ret	12	30
10	(Switzerland) Sauber-Ferrari	12	15	11	15	8	Ret	13	10	14	14	15	16	16	12	17	15	15	14	13	14	5
10	(Switzerland) Sauber-Ferrari	Ret	Ret	Ret	16	11	Ret	15	11	15	17	16	Ret	18†	Ret	18	Ret	Ret	Ret	14	17	5
Pos.	Constructor	AUS (Australia)	CHN (China)	BHR (Bahrain)	RUS (Russia)	ESP (Spain)	MON (Monaco)	CAN (Canada)	AZE (Azerbaijan)	AUT (Austria)	GBR (United Kingdom)	HUN (Hungary)	BEL (Belgium)	ITA (Italy)	SIN (Singapore)	MAL (Malaysia)	JPN (Japan)	USA (United States)	MEX (Mexico)	BRA (Brazil)	ABU (United Arab Emirates)	Points

Key
Colour	Result
Gold	Winner
Silver	Second place
Bronze	Third place
Green	Other points position
Blue	Other classified position
Blue	Not classified, finished (NC)
Purple	Not classified, retired (Ret)
Red	Did not qualify (DNQ)
Black	Disqualified (DSQ)
White	Did not start (DNS)
White	Race cancelled (C)
Blank	Did not practice (DNP)
Blank	Excluded (EX)
Blank	Did not arrive (DNA)
Blank	Withdrawn (WD)
Blank	Did not enter (empty cell)
Annotation	Meaning
P	Pole position
F	Fastest lap

Notes:

- † – Drivers did not finish the Grand Prix, but were classified as they completed more than 90% of the race distance.
- The standings are sorted by best result, rows are not related to the drivers. In case of tie on points, the best positions achieved determined the outcome.

== See also ==
- 2017 Formula One pre-season testing
