= 2017 Mexican Grand Prix =

Race 18 of 20 in the 2017 Formula One World Championship
← Previous race	Next race →

Race details
- Date: 29 October 2017
- Official name: Formula 1 Gran Premio de México 2017
- Location: Autódromo Hermanos Rodríguez, Mexico City, Mexico
- Course: Permanent racing facility
- Course length: 4.304 km (2.674 miles)
- Distance: 71 laps, 305.354 km (189.738 miles)
- Weather: Sunny, dry
- Attendance: 337,043

Pole position
Driver	(Germany) Sebastian Vettel	Ferrari
- Time: 1:16.488

Fastest lap
Driver	(Germany) Sebastian Vettel	Ferrari
- Time: 1:18.785 on lap 68

Podium
First	(Netherlands) Max Verstappen	Red Bull Racing-TAG Heuer
Second	(Finland) Valtteri Bottas	Mercedes
Third	(Finland) Kimi Räikkönen	Ferrari

The 2017 Mexican Grand Prix (formally known as the Formula 1 Gran Premio de México 2017) was a Formula One motor race held on 29 October 2017 at the Autódromo Hermanos Rodríguez in Mexico City. The race marked the nineteenth running of the Mexican Grand Prix, and the eighteenth time that the race had been run as a World Championship event since the inaugural season in 1950.

Red Bull Racing driver Max Verstappen won the race, while Lewis Hamilton secured his fourth world title with two races remaining after championship rival Sebastian Vettel finished fourth.

== Report ==
Hamilton came into the race with a 66-point lead over Vettel and requiring a fifth-place finish to claim his fourth world title. Sebastian Vettel needed to outscore Hamilton by 17 points to keep the championship fight alive.

=== Driver changes ===
Pierre Gasly returned to Toro Rosso after sitting out the United States Grand Prix. Gasly replaced Daniil Kvyat, while the team retained Brendon Hartley (now considered a regular driver and using number 28) in their second car.

=== Qualifying ===
Vettel pipped Verstappen to pole position, the two ahead of the two Mercedes cars of Hamilton and Valtteri Bottas with the Mercedes cars yet again struggling in high downforce circuits but were much closer to Ferrari and Red Bull than in the previous high downforce track in Singapore. Kimi Räikkönen qualified in 5th ahead of Esteban Ocon, Daniel Ricciardo, who had problems heating up his tyres, Nico Hülkenberg, Carlos Sainz and Sergio Pérez.

=== Race ===
Ricciardo took a 20 place grid penalty after replacing a part on his power unit before the race.

Verstappen managed to get himself past Vettel at the second corner and in doing so allowed Hamilton to overtake Vettel. However, Vettel, on the entry to the third corner, clipped Verstappen's right rear tyre and then made a larger impact to Hamilton's right rear tyre. This greatly damaged Vettel's front wing and he had to pit on the first lap to get it replaced. While Verstappen survived the contact with Vettel and minor contact with Hamilton, Hamilton obtained a puncture from the collision with Vettel and had to limp back to the pits and replace his tyres. This left both championship contenders in last with Vettel 19th and Hamilton in 20th, 24 seconds further behind. After the first lap, the running order was Verstappen, Bottas, Ocon, Hülkenberg, Sainz, Pérez and Lance Stroll. Sainz then spun in the high speed section and had to pit for new tyres and came out in 19th place. With Hamilton now out of the points, Vettel needed to finish 2nd in order to keep his championship hopes alive and he swiftly made his way through the field, while Hamilton, with rear diffuser damage, struggled to make his way past Sainz. In the 24th lap, Hülkenberg retired with an engine problem in what was his fourth retirement in five races and his third in a row. Brendon Hartley's Toro Rosso ground to a halt on the 31st lap and brought out the Virtual Safety Car, allowing Räikkönen to jump Ocon into 3rd place and Stroll to jump Pérez into 5th place. Vettel, by the flag, had managed to battle his way to fourth place, but it wasn't enough to stop Hamilton, who finished 9th, from winning the World Championship. Ricciardo (who had retired after a few laps while running in the points), Sainz and Marcus Ericsson, having been running the points for a long time, were the other retirees. Verstappen won for the third time in his career ahead of Bottas and Räikkönen.

== Classification ==
=== Qualifying ===
Pos.	Car no.	Driver	Constructor	Qualifying times			Final grid
Pos.	Car no.	Driver	Constructor	Q1	Q2	Q3	Final grid
1	5	(Germany) Sebastian Vettel	Ferrari	1:17.665	1:16.870	1:16.488	1
2	33	(Netherlands) Max Verstappen	Red Bull Racing-TAG Heuer	1:17.630	1:16.524	1:16.574	2
3	44	(United Kingdom) Lewis Hamilton	Mercedes	1:17.518	1:17.035	1:16.934	3
4	77	(Finland) Valtteri Bottas	Mercedes	1:17.578	1:17.161	1:16.958	4
5	7	(Finland) Kimi Räikkönen	Ferrari	1:18.148	1:17.534	1:17.238	5
6	31	(France) Esteban Ocon	Force India-Mercedes	1:18.336	1:17.827	1:17.437	6
7	3	(Australia) Daniel Ricciardo	Red Bull Racing-TAG Heuer	1:18.208	1:17.631	1:17.447	16^{1}
8	27	(Germany) Nico Hülkenberg	Renault	1:18.322	1:17.792	1:17.466	7
9	55	(Spain) Carlos Sainz Jr.	Renault	1:18.405	1:17.753	1:17.794	8
10	11	(Mexico) Sergio Pérez	Force India-Mercedes	1:18.020	1:17.868	1:17.807	9
11	19	(Brazil) Felipe Massa	Williams-Mercedes	1:18.570	1:18.099		10
12	18	(Canada) Lance Stroll	Williams-Mercedes	1:18.902	1:19.159		11
13	28	(New Zealand) Brendon Hartley	Toro Rosso	1:18.683	No time		17^{2}
14	14	(Spain) Fernando Alonso	McLaren-Honda	1:17.710	No time		18^{3}
15	2	(Belgium) Stoffel Vandoorne	McLaren-Honda	1:18.578	No time		19^{4}
16	9	(Sweden) Marcus Ericsson	Sauber-Ferrari	1:19.176			12
17	94	(Germany) Pascal Wehrlein	Sauber-Ferrari	1:19.333			13
18	20	(Denmark) Kevin Magnussen	Haas-Ferrari	1:19.443			14
19	8	(France) Romain Grosjean	Haas-Ferrari	1:19.473			15
107% time: 1:22.944
—	10	(France) Pierre Gasly	Toro Rosso	No time			20^{5}

Notes

- ^1 – Daniel Ricciardo received a 20-place grid penalty for exceeding his quota of power unit components.
- ^2 – Brendon Hartley received a 20-place grid penalty for exceeding his quota of power unit components.
- ^3 – Fernando Alonso received a 20-place grid penalty for exceeding his quota of power unit components.
- ^4 – Stoffel Vandoorne received a 35-place grid penalty for exceeding his quota of power unit components.
- ^5 – Pierre Gasly failed to set a time within the 107% requirement, but received permission from the stewards to start the race; he also received a 20-place grid penalty for exceeding his quota of power unit components.

=== Race ===
Pos.	No.	Driver	Constructor	Laps	Time/Retired	Grid	Points
1	33	(Netherlands) Max Verstappen	Red Bull Racing-TAG Heuer	71	1:36:26.552	2	25
2	77	(Finland) Valtteri Bottas	Mercedes	71	+19.678	4	18
3	7	(Finland) Kimi Räikkönen	Ferrari	71	+54.007	5	15
4	5	(Germany) Sebastian Vettel	Ferrari	71	+1:10.078	1	12
5	31	(France) Esteban Ocon	Force India-Mercedes	70	+1 Lap	6	10
6	18	(Canada) Lance Stroll	Williams-Mercedes	70	+1 Lap	11	8
7	11	(Mexico) Sergio Pérez	Force India-Mercedes	70	+1 Lap	9	6
8	20	(Denmark) Kevin Magnussen	Haas-Ferrari	70	+1 Lap	14	4
9	44	(United Kingdom) Lewis Hamilton	Mercedes	70	+1 Lap	3	2
10	14	(Spain) Fernando Alonso	McLaren-Honda	70	+1 Lap	18	1
11	19	(Brazil) Felipe Massa	Williams-Mercedes	70	+1 Lap	10	
12	2	(Belgium) Stoffel Vandoorne	McLaren-Honda	70	+1 Lap	19	
13	10	(France) Pierre Gasly	Toro Rosso	70	+1 Lap	20	
14	94	(Germany) Pascal Wehrlein	Sauber-Ferrari	69	+2 Laps	13	
15	8	(France) Romain Grosjean	Haas-Ferrari	69	+2 Laps	15	
Ret	55	(Spain) Carlos Sainz Jr.	Renault	59	Steering	8	
Ret	9	(Sweden) Marcus Ericsson	Sauber-Ferrari	55	Engine	12	
Ret	28	(New Zealand) Brendon Hartley	Toro Rosso	30	Engine	17	
Ret	27	(Germany) Nico Hülkenberg	Renault	24	Power Unit	7	
Ret	3	(Australia) Daniel Ricciardo	Red Bull Racing-TAG Heuer	5	Turbo	16	

== Championship standings after the race ==
Drivers' Championship standings

Pos.	Driver	Points
1	(United Kingdom) **Lewis Hamilton**	333
2	(Germany) Sebastian Vettel	277
3	(Finland) Valtteri Bottas	262
4	(Australia) Daniel Ricciardo	192
5	(Finland) Kimi Räikkönen	178

Constructors' Championship standings

Pos.	Constructor	Points
1	(Germany) **Mercedes**	595
2	(Italy) Ferrari	455
3	(Austria) Red Bull Racing-TAG Heuer	340
4	Force India-Mercedes	175
5	(United Kingdom) Williams-Mercedes	76

- Note: Only the top five positions are included for the sets of standings.
- **Bold text** indicates the 2017 World Champions.

Previous race: 2017 United States Grand Prix	FIA Formula One World Championship; 2017 season	Next race: 2017 Brazilian Grand Prix
Previous race: 2016 Mexican Grand Prix	Mexican Grand Prix	Next race: 2018 Mexican Grand Prix
Awards
Preceded by 2016 Mexican Grand Prix	Formula One Promotional Trophy for Race Promoter; 2017	Succeeded by 2018 Mexican Grand Prix
