= 2017 Spanish Grand Prix =

2017 Formula 1 race

Race 5 of 20 in the 2017 Formula One World Championship
← Previous race	Next race →
- Layout of the Circuit de Barcelona-Catalunya

Race details
- Date: 14 May 2017
- Official name: Formula 1 Gran Premio de España Pirelli 2017
- Location: Circuit de Barcelona-Catalunya; Montmeló, Spain
- Course: Permanent racing facility
- Course length: 4.655 km (2.892 miles)
- Distance: 66 laps, 307.104 km (190.825 miles)
- Weather: Sunny
- Attendance: 177,984

Pole position
Driver	(United Kingdom) Lewis Hamilton	Mercedes
- Time: 1:19.149

Fastest lap
Driver	(United Kingdom) Lewis Hamilton	Mercedes
- Time: 1:23.593 on lap 64

Podium
First	(United Kingdom) Lewis Hamilton	Mercedes
Second	(Germany) Sebastian Vettel	Ferrari
Third	(Australia) Daniel Ricciardo	Red Bull Racing-TAG Heuer

The 2017 Spanish Grand Prix (formally known as the Formula 1 Gran Premio de España Pirelli 2017) was a Formula One motor race held on 14 May 2017 at the Circuit de Barcelona-Catalunya in Montmeló, Spain. The race was the fifth round of the 2017 FIA Formula One World Championship and marked the forty-seventh running of the Spanish Grand Prix as a World Championship event since the inaugural season in 1950, and the twenty-seventh time that a World Championship round had been held at Catalunya.

== Report ==
=== Free practice ===
Both of Friday's practice sessions finished with an identical top six on the timesheet, with Lewis Hamilton heading the list, his Mercedes teammate Valtteri Bottas second and the Ferraris of Kimi Räikkönen and Sebastian Vettel third and fourth respectively. Next came the Red Bulls, with Max Verstappen fifth in both sessions and Daniel Ricciardo sixth. McLaren Honda's run of poor reliability continued, with home favourite Fernando Alonso sitting out most of the first session after his car suffered a major engine failure during his first lap. Alonso was able to take part in the second session, but had to wait until almost half an hour into it while his team was completing an engine change.

The third practice session, on Saturday morning, finished with Räikkönen quickest, Vettel second, and Hamilton third. Bottas was fourth after his engine suffered a water leak and he was only able to run towards the end of the session, once Mercedes had changed the engine. The Red Bull pair of Verstappen and Ricciardo were again fifth and sixth.

=== Qualifying ===
Lewis Hamilton claimed pole position from Sebastian Vettel by 0.051 seconds. Vettel was initially ordered to stop the car on track for an engine problem in Q1 but he questioned the decision and the problem was resolved and allowed him to continue. Valtteri Bottas and Kimi Räikkönen filled up the second row followed by the Red Bulls of Max Verstappen and Daniel Ricciardo. Fernando Alonso delivered a shocking result to get his underpowered McLaren into Q3 and then qualifying as the best of the rest behind Mercedes, Ferrari and Red Bull. The top ten was filled out by Sergio Pérez, Felipe Massa and Esteban Ocon.

=== Race ===
Vettel had a better start than Hamilton and led into the first corner. An incident with Bottas, Räikkönen and Verstappen meant that both Räikkönen and Verstappen retired with suspension damage and Bottas was left slightly handicapped. The incident also caused Felipe Massa to obtain a puncture, while also forcing Alonso off the track, leading them to eventually finish the race outside of the points. This left the top ten as Vettel, Hamilton, Bottas, Ricciardo, Pérez, Ocon, Hülkenberg, Magnussen, Sainz and Grosjean. Hamilton stuck with Vettel for fourteen laps, when Ferrari decided to cover off the undercut by pitting for softs. Hamilton meanwhile stayed out on track for seven extra laps and rejoined around seven seconds behind Vettel on the medium tyres. Vettel lost around four seconds to Hamilton trying to get past Bottas, who hadn't pitted yet, before completing a spectacular overtake on Bottas.

With just over thirty laps remaining, the McLaren of Vandoorne drove into Massa and retired with suspension damage, earning him a grid penalty at the next race. The Virtual Safety Car (VSC) was brought out so his car could be removed and this allowed Hamilton to pit for the faster soft tyres, while not losing much time to Vettel due to the limited speed. Vettel then pitted for the slower medium tyres as was required, just when the VSC had finished, resulting in Vettel coming out of the pitlane alongside Hamilton. They touched wheels and Hamilton was forced off the track and had to fall behind Vettel. Then on lap 38, the Mercedes of Bottas suffered an engine failure (from the engine he had used for all previous races) and this promoted Ricciardo into a podium place. Meanwhile, Pascal Wehrlein who was doing a one-stop, used the VSC to his advantage and came out of the pits in eighth; he then got promoted to seventh following Bottas's retirement. However, he received a five-second penalty for an error in entering the pit lane.

Hamilton, with faster tyres, then managed to overtake Vettel for the lead on the pit straight on lap 44 and held on to the lead to win the race, reducing Vettel's lead in the championship to 6 points and increasing Mercedes's lead in the Constructors' Championship to eight points over Ferrari. Ricciardo finished third for his first podium of the season and took the fifth place in the Championship from Verstappen. Despite new upgrades, his Red Bull was 75 seconds behind Hamilton, the furthest back they had been all season, and Ricciardo was the only other car apart from the two leaders to finish on the lead lap. The next to cross the line were the Force Indias of Pérez and Ocon. Then Nico Hülkenberg finished in sixth place for Renault, their highest finish since returning to the sport in 2016. Wehrlein crossed the line in seventh but was demoted to eighth with his penalty, still picking up four valuable points for the struggling Sauber team, with the Toro Rosso of Carlos Sainz being promoted to the seventh in his stead. Kvyat and Grosjean finished ninth and tenth respectively after Kevin Magnussen, who was running in ninth, suffered a late puncture due to contact with Kvyat and fell to fourteenth. Fernando Alonso finished in twelfth, the first time he had finished a race in the season, but he admitted he was lacking the race pace to go with his superb qualifying.

== Classification ==
=== Qualifying ===
Pos.	Car no.	Driver	Constructor	Qualifying times			Final grid
Pos.	Car no.	Driver	Constructor	Q1	Q2	Q3	Final grid
1	44	(United Kingdom) Lewis Hamilton	Mercedes	1:20.511	1:20.210	1:19.149	1
2	5	(Germany) Sebastian Vettel	Ferrari	1:20.939	1:20.295	1:19.200	2
3	77	(Finland) Valtteri Bottas	Mercedes	1:20.991	1:20.300	1:19.373	3
4	7	(Finland) Kimi Räikkönen	Ferrari	1:20.742	1:20.621	1:19.439	4
5	33	(Netherlands) Max Verstappen	Red Bull Racing-TAG Heuer	1:21.430	1:20.722	1:19.706	5
6	3	(Australia) Daniel Ricciardo	Red Bull Racing-TAG Heuer	1:21.704	1:20.855	1:20.175	6
7	14	(Spain) Fernando Alonso	McLaren-Honda	1:22.015	1:21.251	1:21.048	7
8	11	(Mexico) Sergio Pérez	Force India-Mercedes	1:21.998	1:21.239	1:21.070	8
9	19	(Brazil) Felipe Massa	Williams-Mercedes	1:22.138	1:21.222	1:21.232	9
10	31	(France) Esteban Ocon	Force India-Mercedes	1:21.901	1:21.148	1:21.272	10
11	20	(Denmark) Kevin Magnussen	Haas-Ferrari	1:21.945	1:21.329		11
12	55	(Spain) Carlos Sainz Jr.	Toro Rosso	1:21.941	1:21.371		12
13	27	(Germany) Nico Hülkenberg	Renault	1:22.091	1:21.397		13
14	8	(France) Romain Grosjean	Haas-Ferrari	1:21.822	1:21.517		14
15	94	(Germany) Pascal Wehrlein	Sauber-Ferrari	1:22.327	1:21.803		15
16	9	(Sweden) Marcus Ericsson	Sauber-Ferrari	1:22.332			16
17	30	(United Kingdom) Jolyon Palmer	Renault	1:22.401			17
18	18	(Canada) Lance Stroll	Williams-Mercedes	1:22.411			18
19	2	(Belgium) Stoffel Vandoorne	McLaren-Honda	1:22.532			20^{1}
20	26	(Russia) Daniil Kvyat	Toro Rosso	1:22.746			19
107% time: 1:26.147

- ^1 – Stoffel Vandoorne received a ten-place grid penalty for use of additional power unit elements.

=== Race ===
Pos.	No.	Driver	Constructor	Laps	Time/Retired	Grid	Points
1	44	(United Kingdom) Lewis Hamilton	Mercedes	66	1:35:56.497	1	25
2	5	(Germany) Sebastian Vettel	Ferrari	66	+3.490	2	18
3	3	(Australia) Daniel Ricciardo	Red Bull Racing-TAG Heuer	66	+1:15.820	6	15
4	11	(Mexico) Sergio Pérez	Force India-Mercedes	65	+1 Lap	8	12
5	31	(France) Esteban Ocon	Force India-Mercedes	65	+1 Lap	10	10
6	27	(Germany) Nico Hülkenberg	Renault	65	+1 Lap	13	8
7	55	(Spain) Carlos Sainz Jr.	Toro Rosso	65	+1 Lap	12	6
8	94	(Germany) Pascal Wehrlein	Sauber-Ferrari	65	+1 Lap^{1}	15	4
9	26	(Russia) Daniil Kvyat	Toro Rosso	65	+1 Lap	19	2
10	8	(France) Romain Grosjean	Haas-Ferrari	65	+1 Lap	14	1
11	9	(Sweden) Marcus Ericsson	Sauber-Ferrari	64	+2 Laps	16	
12	14	(Spain) Fernando Alonso	McLaren-Honda	64	+2 Laps	7	
13	19	(Brazil) Felipe Massa	Williams-Mercedes	64	+2 Laps	9	
14	20	(Denmark) Kevin Magnussen	Haas-Ferrari	64	+2 Laps	11	
15	30	(United Kingdom) Jolyon Palmer	Renault	64	+2 Laps	17	
16	18	(Canada) Lance Stroll	Williams-Mercedes	64	+2 Laps	18	
Ret	77	(Finland) Valtteri Bottas	Mercedes	38	Engine	3	
Ret	2	(Belgium) Stoffel Vandoorne	McLaren-Honda	32	Accident	20	
Ret	33	(Netherlands) Max Verstappen	Red Bull Racing-TAG Heuer	1	Collision damage	5	
Ret	7	(Finland) Kimi Räikkönen	Ferrari	0	Collision damage	4	

Notes

- ^1 – Pascal Wehrlein finished 7th, but received a 5-second penalty for failing to keep to the right of the pit-entry bollard.

== Championship standings after the race ==
Drivers' Championship standings

	Pos.	Driver	Points
	1	(Germany) Sebastian Vettel	104
	2	(United Kingdom) Lewis Hamilton	98
	3	(Finland) Valtteri Bottas	63
	4	(Finland) Kimi Räikkönen	49
1	5	(Australia) Daniel Ricciardo	37

Constructors' Championship standings

	Pos.	Constructor	Points
	1	(Germany) Mercedes	161
	2	(Italy) Ferrari	153
	3	(Austria) Red Bull Racing-TAG Heuer	72
	4	Force India-Mercedes	53
1	5	(Italy) Toro Rosso	21

- Note: Only the top five positions are included for both sets of standings.

== See also ==
- 2017 Barcelona Formula 2 round
- 2017 Barcelona GP3 Series round

Previous race: 2017 Russian Grand Prix	FIA Formula One World Championship; 2017 season	Next race: 2017 Monaco Grand Prix
Previous race: 2016 Spanish Grand Prix	Spanish Grand Prix	Next race: 2018 Spanish Grand Prix
