= 2017 British Grand Prix =

Race 10 of 20 in the 2017 Formula One World Championship
← Previous race	Next race →
- Layout of the Silverstone Circuit

Race details
- Date: 16 July 2017
- Official name: 2017 Formula 1 Rolex British Grand Prix
- Location: Silverstone Circuit; Silverstone, United Kingdom
- Course: Permanent racing facility
- Course length: 5.891 km (3.660 miles)
- Distance: 51 laps, 300.307 km (186.602 miles)
- Scheduled distance: 52 laps, 306.198 km (190.262 miles)
- Weather: Overcast
- Attendance: 344,500

Pole position
Driver	(United Kingdom) Lewis Hamilton	Mercedes
- Time: 1:26.600

Fastest lap
Driver	(United Kingdom) Lewis Hamilton	Mercedes
- Time: 1:30.621 on lap 48

Podium
First	(United Kingdom) Lewis Hamilton	Mercedes
Second	(Finland) Valtteri Bottas	Mercedes
Third	(Finland) Kimi Räikkönen	Ferrari

The 2017 British Grand Prix (formally known as the 2017 Formula 1 Rolex British Grand Prix) was a Formula One motor race that took place on 16 July 2017 at the Silverstone Circuit in Silverstone, United Kingdom. This race was the seventy-second running of the British Grand Prix, the sixty-eighth time that the race has been run as a World Championship event, and the fifty-first time that the World Championship event has been held at the Silverstone Circuit.

Ferrari driver Sebastian Vettel entered the round with a twenty-point lead over Mercedes's Lewis Hamilton in the Drivers' Championship. Mercedes led Ferrari by thirty-three points in the Constructors' Championship.

The race was dominated and won by Lewis Hamilton, who achieved a grand slam: starting from pole position, leading every lap of the race, setting fastest lap, and winning with a 14-second lead over Mercedes teammate Valtteri Bottas.

With his fifth British Grand Prix win, Hamilton equalled the records of Alain Prost and Jim Clark, who won the race five times each. His championship rival Sebastian Vettel suffered a tyre failure with two laps to go and finished seventh. As a result, Vettel's lead over Hamilton in the Drivers' standings was cut down to one point. Kimi Räikkönen, Vettel's teammate, suffered the same problem while in second position and lost his place to Bottas, and managed to finish third.

== Report ==
=== Background ===
On 11 July 2017, the BRDC, the owners of Silverstone, activated a break clause in their contract meaning unless a new contract is signed, 2019 will be the final year the British Grand Prix takes place at Silverstone.

As the race was on the week of the British premiere of Cars 3, there was a special pit garage for Lightning McQueen and Jackson Storm. McQueen's voice actor, Owen Wilson, was in attendance, alongside director Brian Fee and producer Kevin Reher. They visited the garages of Lewis Hamilton, Sebastian Vettel, and Fernando Alonso, who voice the English, German, and Spanish voices of the built-in voice command assistant Hamilton. Wilson also experienced the Silverstone circuit with a ride in the F1 Experiences two-seater car.

=== Practice ===
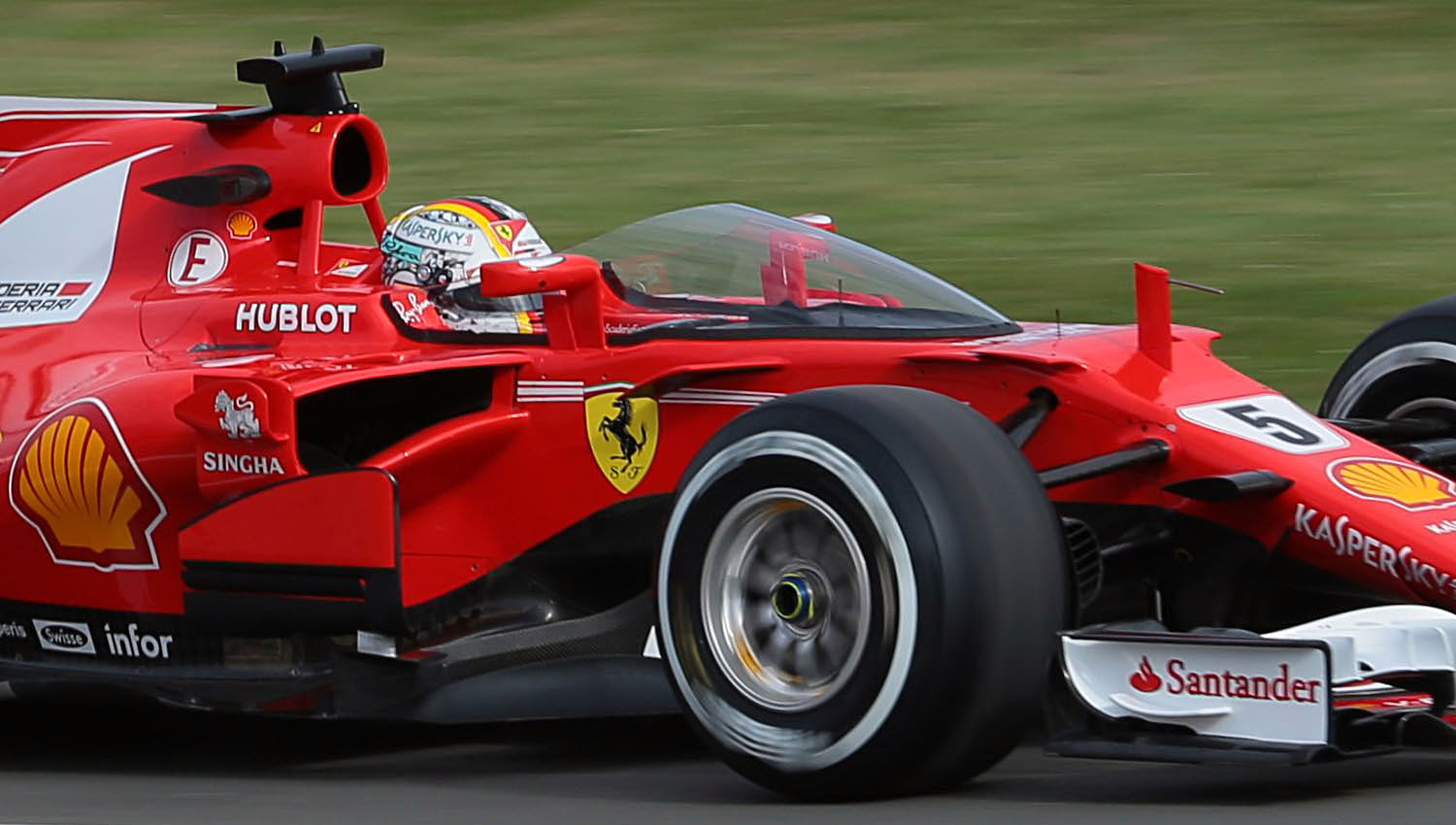
Sebastian Vettel testing the "Shield" cockpit protection device.

The first free practice session saw the public début of the "shield" cockpit protection device, a reinforced perspex crash structure mounted to the monocoque. The shield is designed to provide additional driver protection by deflecting debris away from a driver's head without compromising the ability of marshalls to access the cockpit in the event of an accident. The initial testing was carried out by Ferrari to assess the shield's design ahead of a planned introduction in 2018. Sebastian Vettel responded negatively to the design, cutting short his testing of the device and subsequently reporting that the concave shape of the shield distorted his vision and made him feel dizzy.

Mercedes's Valtteri Bottas went fastest in first practice, setting a time of 1:29.106. He was followed by his teammate Lewis Hamilton and the Red Bull of Max Verstappen in second and third. In second practice, Bottas was fastest followed by Hamilton and Räikkönen. Saturday's third and final practice was topped by Hamilton, with Vettel second and Bottas third. Hamilton set the quickest time of all three practices with a 1:28.063, closely followed by Vettel who set a 1:28.095.

=== Qualifying ===
Q1 was affected by rain and most drivers used intermediate tyres. Daniel Ricciardo's Red Bull experienced a turbo failure, ending his qualifying run. Fernando Alonso opted to change to supersoft tyres during the final minutes of Q1 as the track dried. He subsequently set the fastest time of the session, a 1:37.598.

In Q3, Lewis Hamilton secured pole position with a 1:26.600, 0.547 seconds quicker than Kimi Räikkönen in second, and 0.756 seconds quicker than Vettel in third. Nico Hülkenberg gave Renault team its best qualifying result since its return to F1 in 2016, with fifth. Hamilton's pole equalled Jim Clark's record for most poles at the British Grand Prix. Valtteri Bottas set the fourth fastest time during Q3 but started from ninth position after being set back five places as a result of an unauthorised gearbox change. Subsequently, Max Verstappen started fourth.

=== Race ===
In the formation lap Jolyon Palmer suffered a hydraulic failure and retired from the race. Another formation lap was held and thus the Grand Prix was shortened to 51 laps instead of the scheduled 52 laps.

At the start, Hamilton easily pulled away opening a 1.6 seconds gap to Räikkönen after just one lap. Sebastian Vettel, starting from third, was overtaken by Max Verstappen. Valtteri Bottas started his slow run towards what would become a second place, overtaking both McLaren Honda driver Stoffel Vandoorne and Sergio Pérez in a Force India, who started from eight and sixth respectively. A crash of the Toro Rosso drivers Carlos Sainz Jr. and Daniil Kvyat, caused by Kvyat, brought out the safety car on lap 2, with Sainz retiring while Kvyat continued but finished the race only fifteenth after receiving a drive-through penalty.

At the restart, once again Hamilton pulled away and, in the following laps, opened a gap towards second placed Kimi Räikkönen which allowed him to cruise to victory. Meanwhile, Bottas continued his charge and got up to fifth place before lap 7, overtaking Esteban Ocon and Nico Hülkenberg. Vettel, after the restart, was stuck behind the Red Bull of Max Verstappen and the two banged wheels as Vettel tried to overtake. Verstappen stayed in third but Vettel eventually got out in front of him after he pitted on lap 18, one lap earlier than Verstappen.

Bottas, who was the only one of the top ten who started on the slower but more durable soft tyres instead of supersoft versions, stayed out until lap 32 and then pitted for the supersoft tyres. As he set fastest lap he soon caught up to Vettel and overtook him on lap 44, moving up into third. Meanwhile, Daniel Ricciardo, who started from 19th on the grid, also moved up, overtaking, among others, Fernando Alonso, Sergio Pérez and Kevin Magnussen. He eventually finished fifth.

In the final laps, both Ferraris suffered punctures. On lap 49 Kimi Räikkönen suffered a puncture on his left front tyre. With a relatively short distance to the pits, Räikkönen only lost second place to Bottas and still managed to finish third. Vettel's puncture came on lap 51 with almost the entire lap remaining to return to the pits with a blown tire. Losing a significant amount of time, the blow out dropped him down to seventh place.

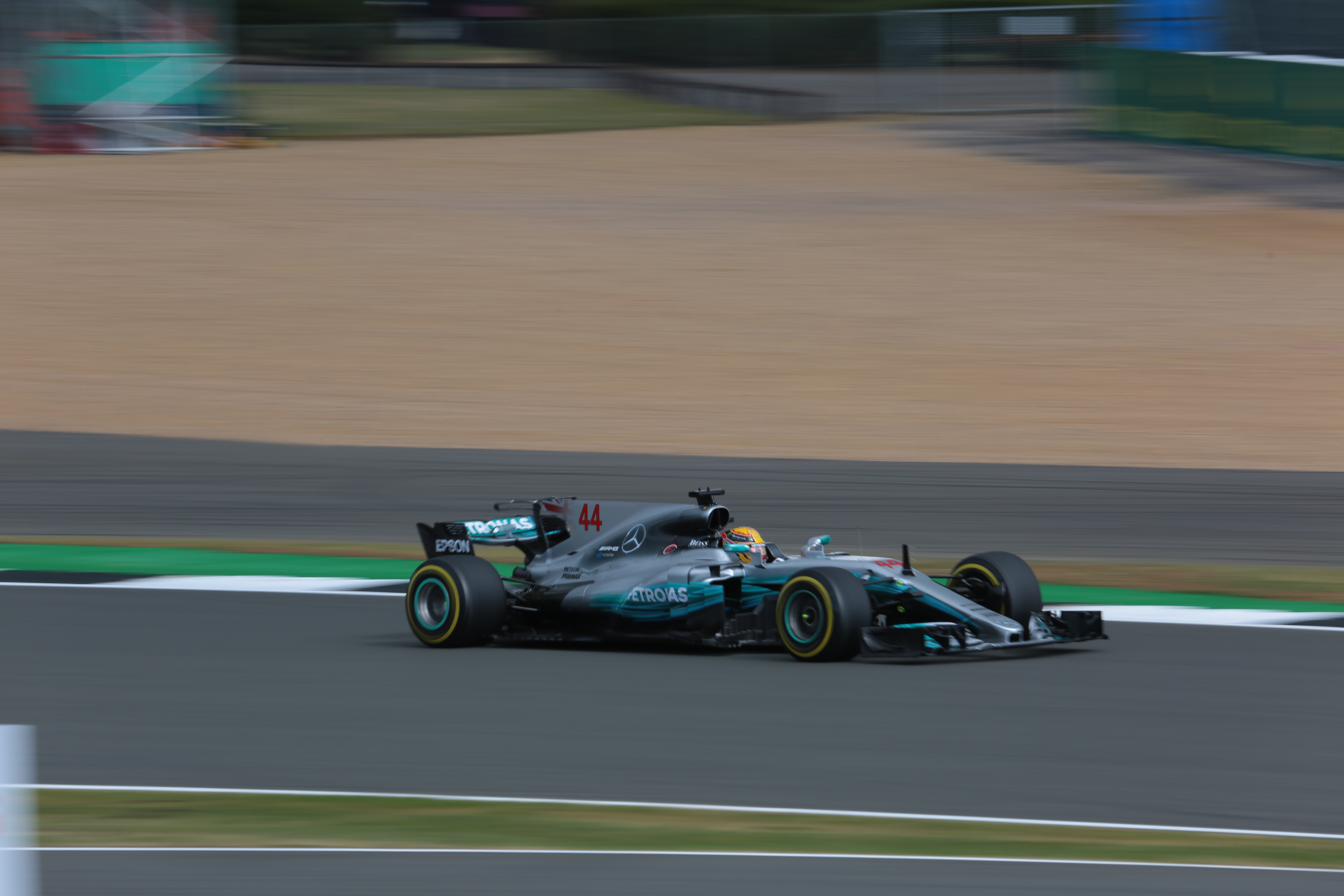
Lewis Hamilton won his fifth British Grand Prix.

As a result of the race, Hamilton narrowed the gap to Vettel in the Drivers' Championship to just one point, while Mercedes expanded their lead in the Constructors' Championship to 55 points over Ferrari.

The result marked Hamilton's fifth career grand slam. Additionally, Hamilton equaled the record for most British Grand Prix wins held jointly by Alain Prost and Jim Clark.

== Classification ==
=== Qualifying ===
Pos.	Car no.	Driver	Constructor	Qualifying times			Final grid
Pos.	Car no.	Driver	Constructor	Q1	Q2	Q3	Final grid
1	44	(United Kingdom) Lewis Hamilton	Mercedes	1:39.069	1:27.893	1:26.600	1
2	7	(Finland) Kimi Räikkönen	Ferrari	1:40.455	1:28.992	1:27.147	2
3	5	(Germany) Sebastian Vettel	Ferrari	1:39.962	1:28.978	1:27.356	3
4	77	(Finland) Valtteri Bottas	Mercedes	1:39.698	1:28.732	1:27.376	9^{1}
5	33	(Netherlands) Max Verstappen	Red Bull Racing-TAG Heuer	1:38.912	1:29.431	1:28.130	4
6	27	(Germany) Nico Hülkenberg	Renault	1:39.201	1:29.340	1:28.856	5
7	11	(Mexico) Sergio Pérez	Force India-Mercedes	1:42.009	1:29.824	1:28.902	6
8	31	(France) Esteban Ocon	Force India-Mercedes	1:39.738	1:29.701	1:29.074	7
9	2	(Belgium) Stoffel Vandoorne	McLaren-Honda	1:40.011	1:30.105	1:29.418	8
10	8	(France) Romain Grosjean	Haas-Ferrari	1:42.042	1:29.966	1:29.549	10
11	30	(United Kingdom) Jolyon Palmer	Renault	1:41.404	1:30.193		11
12	26	(Russia) Daniil Kvyat	Toro Rosso	1:41.726	1:30.355		12
13	14	(Spain) Fernando Alonso	McLaren-Honda	1:37.598	1:30.600		20^{2}
14	55	(Spain) Carlos Sainz Jr.	Toro Rosso	1:41.114	1:31.368		13
15	19	(Brazil) Felipe Massa	Williams-Mercedes	1:41.874	1:31.482		14
16	18	(Canada) Lance Stroll	Williams-Mercedes	1:42.573			15
17	20	(Denmark) Kevin Magnussen	Haas-Ferrari	1:42.577			16
18	94	(Germany) Pascal Wehrlein	Sauber-Ferrari	1:42.593			17
19	9	(Sweden) Marcus Ericsson	Sauber-Ferrari	1:42.633			18
20	3	(Australia) Daniel Ricciardo	Red Bull Racing-TAG Heuer	1:42.966			19^{3}
107% time: 1:44.429

Notes

- ^1 – Valtteri Bottas received a five-place grid penalty for an unscheduled gearbox change.
- ^2 – Fernando Alonso received a thirty-place grid penalty for use of additional power unit elements.
- ^3 – Daniel Ricciardo received a five-place grid penalty for an unscheduled gearbox change and a ten-place grid penalty for use of additional power unit elements.

=== Race ===
Pos.	No.	Driver	Constructor	Laps	Time/Retired	Grid	Points
1	44	(United Kingdom) Lewis Hamilton	Mercedes	51	1:21:27.430	1	25
2	77	(Finland) Valtteri Bottas	Mercedes	51	+14.063	9	18
3	7	(Finland) Kimi Räikkönen	Ferrari	51	+36.570	2	15
4	33	(Netherlands) Max Verstappen	Red Bull Racing-TAG Heuer	51	+52.125	4	12
5	3	(Australia) Daniel Ricciardo	Red Bull Racing-TAG Heuer	51	+1:05.955	19	10
6	27	(Germany) Nico Hülkenberg	Renault	51	+1:08.109	5	8
7	5	(Germany) Sebastian Vettel	Ferrari	51	+1:33.989	3	6
8	31	(France) Esteban Ocon	Force India-Mercedes	50	+1 lap	7	4
9	11	(Mexico) Sergio Pérez	Force India-Mercedes	50	+1 lap	6	2
10	19	(Brazil) Felipe Massa	Williams-Mercedes	50	+1 lap	14	1
11	2	(Belgium) Stoffel Vandoorne	McLaren-Honda	50	+1 lap	8	
12	20	(Denmark) Kevin Magnussen	Haas-Ferrari	50	+1 lap	16	
13	8	(France) Romain Grosjean	Haas-Ferrari	50	+1 lap	10	
14	9	(Sweden) Marcus Ericsson	Sauber-Ferrari	50	+1 lap	18	
15	26	(Russia) Daniil Kvyat	Toro Rosso	50	+1 lap	12	
16	18	(Canada) Lance Stroll	Williams-Mercedes	50	+1 lap	15	
17	94	(Germany) Pascal Wehrlein	Sauber-Ferrari	50	+1 lap	17	
Ret	14	(Spain) Fernando Alonso	McLaren-Honda	32	Fuel pump	20	
Ret	55	(Spain) Carlos Sainz Jr.	Toro Rosso	0	Collision	13	
DNS	30	(United Kingdom) Jolyon Palmer	Renault	0	Hydraulics	—^{1}	

Notes

- ^1 – Jolyon Palmer did not line up on the grid as a result of a hydraulic failure on the first formation lap.

== Championship standings after the race ==
Drivers' Championship standings

Pos.	Driver	Points
1	(Germany) Sebastian Vettel	177
2	(United Kingdom) Lewis Hamilton	176
3	(Finland) Valtteri Bottas	154
4	(Australia) Daniel Ricciardo	117
5	(Finland) Kimi Räikkönen	98

Constructors' Championship standings

Pos.	Constructor	Points
1	(Germany) Mercedes	330
2	(Italy) Ferrari	275
3	(Austria) Red Bull Racing-TAG Heuer	174
4	Force India-Mercedes	95
5	(United Kingdom) Williams-Mercedes	41

- Note: Only the top five positions are included for both sets of standings.

== See also ==
- 2017 Silverstone Formula 2 round
- 2017 Silverstone GP3 Series round

Previous race: 2017 Austrian Grand Prix	FIA Formula One World Championship; 2017 season	Next race: 2017 Hungarian Grand Prix
Previous race: 2016 British Grand Prix	British Grand Prix	Next race: 2018 British Grand Prix
