= Red Bull Racing Grand Prix results =

These are the complete Grand Prix racing results for Red Bull Racing.

== Complete Formula One results ==
=== 2000s ===
(key)

Year	Chassis	Engine	Tyres	Drivers	1	2	3	4	5	6	7	8	9	10	11	12	13	14	15	16	17	18	19	Points	WCC
2005	RB1	Cosworth TJ2005 3.0 V10	M		AUS	MAL	BHR	SMR	ESP	MON	EUR	CAN	USA	FRA	GBR	GER	HUN	TUR	ITA	BEL	BRA	JPN	CHN	34	7th
2005	RB1	Cosworth TJ2005 3.0 V10	M	(United Kingdom) David Coulthard	4	6	8	11	8	Ret	4	7	DNS	10	13	7	Ret	7	15	Ret	Ret	6	9	34	7th
2005	RB1	Cosworth TJ2005 3.0 V10	M	(Austria) Christian Klien	7	8	DNS					8	DNS	Ret	15	9	Ret	8	13	9	9	9	5	34	7th
2005	RB1	Cosworth TJ2005 3.0 V10	M	(Italy) Vitantonio Liuzzi				8	Ret	Ret	9													34	7th
2006	RB2	Ferrari 056 2.4 V8	M		BHR	MAL	AUS	SMR	EUR	ESP	MON	GBR	CAN	USA	FRA	GER	HUN	TUR	ITA	CHN	JPN	BRA		16	7th
2006	RB2	Ferrari 056 2.4 V8	M	(United Kingdom) David Coulthard	10	Ret	8	Ret	Ret	14	3	12	8	7	9	11	5	15^{†}	12	9	Ret	Ret		16	7th
2006	RB2	Ferrari 056 2.4 V8	M	(Austria) Christian Klien	8	Ret	Ret	Ret	Ret	13	Ret	14	11	Ret	12	8	Ret	11	11					16	7th
2006	RB2	Ferrari 056 2.4 V8	M	(Netherlands) Robert Doornbos																12	13	12		16	7th
2007	RB3	Renault RS27 2.4 V8	B		AUS	MAL	BHR	ESP	MON	CAN	USA	FRA	GBR	EUR	HUN	TUR	ITA	BEL	JPN	CHN	BRA			24	5th
2007	RB3	Renault RS27 2.4 V8	B	(United Kingdom) David Coulthard	Ret	Ret	Ret	5	14	Ret	Ret	13	11	5	11	10	Ret	Ret	4	8	9			24	5th
2007	RB3	Renault RS27 2.4 V8	B	(Australia) Mark Webber	13	10	Ret	Ret	Ret	9	7	12	Ret	3	9	Ret	9	7	Ret	10	Ret			24	5th
2008	RB4	Renault RS27 2.4 V8	B		AUS	MAL	BHR	ESP	TUR	MON	CAN	FRA	GBR	GER	HUN	EUR	BEL	ITA	SIN	JPN	CHN	BRA		29	7th
2008	RB4	Renault RS27 2.4 V8	B	(United Kingdom) David Coulthard	Ret	9	18	12	9	Ret	3	9	Ret	13	14	17	11	16	7	Ret	10	Ret		29	7th
2008	RB4	Renault RS27 2.4 V8	B	(Australia) Mark Webber	Ret	7	7	5	7	4	12	6	10	Ret	9	12	8	8	Ret	8	14	9		29	7th
2009	RB5	Renault RS27 2.4 V8	B		AUS	MAL	CHN	BHR	ESP	MON	TUR	GBR	GER	HUN	EUR	BEL	ITA	SIN	JPN	BRA	ABU			153.5	2nd
2009	RB5	Renault RS27 2.4 V8	B	(Germany) Sebastian Vettel	13^{†}	15^{†}	1^{P}	2	4	Ret	3^{P}	1^{P}^{F}	2	Ret	Ret	3^{F}	8	4	1^{P}	4	1^{F}			153.5	2nd
2009	RB5	Renault RS27 2.4 V8	B	(Australia) Mark Webber	12	6^{‡}	2	11	3	5	2	2	1^{P}	3^{F}	9	9	Ret	Ret	17^{F}	1^{F}	2			153.5	2nd

=== 2010s ===
(key)

Year	Chassis	Engine	Tyres	Drivers	1	2	3	4	5	6	7	8	9	10	11	12	13	14	15	16	17	18	19	20	21	Points	WCC
2010	RB6	Renault RS27-2010 2.4 V8	B		BHR	AUS	MAL	CHN	ESP	MON	TUR	CAN	EUR	GBR	GER	HUN	BEL	ITA	SIN	JPN	KOR	BRA	ABU			498	1st
2010	RB6	Renault RS27-2010 2.4 V8	B	(Germany) Sebastian Vettel	4^{P}	Ret^{P}	1	6^{P}	3	2^{F}	Ret	4	1^{P}	7^{P}	3^{P}^{F}	3^{P}^{F}	15	4	2	1^{P}	Ret^{P}	1	1^{P}			498	1st
2010	RB6	Renault RS27-2010 2.4 V8	B	(Australia) Mark Webber	8	9^{F}	2^{P}^{F}	8	1^{P}	1^{P}	3^{P}	5	Ret	1	6	1	2^{P}	6	3	2^{F}	Ret	2	8			498	1st
2011	RB7	Renault RS27-2011 2.4 V8	P		AUS	MAL	CHN	TUR	ESP	MON	CAN	EUR	GBR	GER	HUN	BEL	ITA	SIN	JPN	KOR	IND	ABU	BRA			650	1st
2011	RB7	Renault RS27-2011 2.4 V8	P	(Germany) Sebastian Vettel	1^{P}	1^{P}	2^{P}	1^{P}	1	1^{P}	2^{P}	1^{P}^{F}	2	4	2^{P}	1^{P}	1^{P}	1^{P}	3^{P}	1^{F}	1^{P}^{F}	Ret^{P}	2^{P}			650	1st
2011	RB7	Renault RS27-2011 2.4 V8	P	(Australia) Mark Webber	5	4^{F}	3^{F}	2^{F}	4^{P}	4^{F}	3	3	3^{P}	3^{P}	5	2^{F}	Ret	3	4	3	4	4^{F}	1^{F}			650	1st
2012	RB8	Renault RS27-2012 2.4 V8	P		AUS	MAL	CHN	BHR	ESP	MON	CAN	EUR	GBR	GER	HUN	BEL	ITA	SIN	JPN	KOR	IND	ABU	USA	BRA		460	1st
2012	RB8	Renault RS27-2012 2.4 V8	P	(Germany) Sebastian Vettel	2	11	5	1^{P}^{F}	6	4	4^{P}^{F}	Ret^{P}	3	5	4^{F}	2	22^{†}	1	1^{P}^{F}	1	1^{P}	3^{F}	2^{P}^{F}	6		460	1st
2012	RB8	Renault RS27-2012 2.4 V8	P	(Australia) Mark Webber	4	4	4	4	11	1^{P}	7	4	1	8	8	6	20^{†}	11	9	2^{P}^{F}	3	Ret	Ret	4		460	1st
2013	RB9	Renault RS27-2013 2.4 V8	P		AUS	MAL	CHN	BHR	ESP	MON	CAN	GBR	GER	HUN	BEL	ITA	SIN	KOR	JPN	IND	ABU	USA	BRA			596	1st
2013	RB9	Renault RS27-2013 2.4 V8	P	(Germany) Sebastian Vettel	3^{P}	1^{P}	4^{F}	1^{F}	4	2^{F}	1^{P}	Ret	1	3	1^{F}	1^{P}	1^{P}^{F}	1^{P}^{F}	1	1^{P}	1	1^{P}^{F}	1^{P}			596	1st
2013	RB9	Renault RS27-2013 2.4 V8	P	(Australia) Mark Webber	6	2	Ret	7	5	3	4^{F}	2^{F}	7	4^{F}	5	3	15^{†}	Ret	2^{P}^{F}	Ret	2^{P}	3	2^{F}			596	1st
2014	RB10	Renault Energy F1-2014 1.6 V6 t	P		AUS	MAL	BHR	CHN	ESP	MON	CAN	AUT	GBR	GER	HUN	BEL	ITA	SIN	JPN	RUS	USA	BRA	ABU			405	2nd
2014	RB10	Renault Energy F1-2014 1.6 V6 t	P	(Australia) Daniel Ricciardo	DSQ	Ret	4	4	3	3	1	8	3	6	1	1	5	3	4	7	3	Ret	4^{F}			405	2nd
2014	RB10	Renault Energy F1-2014 1.6 V6 t	P	(Germany) Sebastian Vettel	Ret	3	6	5	4^{F}	Ret	3	Ret	5	4	7	5	6	2	3	8	7^{F}	5	8			405	2nd
2015	RB11	Renault Energy F1-2015 1.6 V6 t	P		AUS	MAL	CHN	BHR	ESP	MON	CAN	AUT	GBR	HUN	BEL	ITA	SIN	JPN	RUS	USA	MEX	BRA	ABU			187	4th
2015	RB11	Renault Energy F1-2015 1.6 V6 t	P	(Russia) Daniil Kvyat	DNS	9	Ret	9	10	4	9	12	6	2	4	10	6	13	5	Ret	4	7	10			187	4th
2015	RB11	Renault Energy F1-2015 1.6 V6 t	P	(Australia) Daniel Ricciardo	6	10	9	6	7	5^{F}	13	10	Ret	3^{F}	Ret	8	2^{F}	15	15^{†}	10	5	11	6			187	4th
2016	RB12	TAG Heuer 1.6 V6 t	P		AUS	BHR	CHN	RUS	ESP	MON	CAN	EUR	AUT	GBR	HUN	GER	BEL	ITA	SIN	MAL	JPN	USA	MEX	BRA	ABU	468	2nd
2016	RB12	TAG Heuer 1.6 V6 t	P	(Russia) Daniil Kvyat	DNS	7	3	15																		468	2nd
2016	RB12	TAG Heuer 1.6 V6 t	P	(Australia) Daniel Ricciardo	4^{F}	4	4	11	4	2^{P}	7	7	5	4	3	2^{F}	2	5	2^{F}	1	6	3	3^{F}	8	5	468	2nd
2016	RB12	TAG Heuer 1.6 V6 t	P	(Netherlands) Max Verstappen					1	Ret	4	8	2	2	5	3	11	7	6	2	2	Ret	4	3^{F}	4	468	2nd
2017	RB13	TAG Heuer 1.6 V6 t	P		AUS	CHN	BHR	RUS	ESP	MON	CAN	AZE	AUT	GBR	HUN	BEL	ITA	SIN	MAL	JPN	USA	MEX	BRA	ABU		368	3rd
2017	RB13	TAG Heuer 1.6 V6 t	P	(Australia) Daniel Ricciardo	Ret	4	5	Ret	3	3	3	1	3	5	Ret	3	4^{F}	2	3	3	Ret	Ret	6	Ret		368	3rd
2017	RB13	TAG Heuer 1.6 V6 t	P	(Netherlands) Max Verstappen	5	3	Ret	5	Ret	5	Ret	Ret	Ret	4	5	Ret	10	Ret	1	2	4	1	5^{F}	5		368	3rd
2018	RB14	TAG Heuer 1.6 V6 t	P		AUS	BHR	CHN	AZE	ESP	MON	CAN	FRA	AUT	GBR	GER	HUN	BEL	ITA	SIN	RUS	JPN	USA	MEX	BRA	ABU	419	3rd
2018	RB14	TAG Heuer 1.6 V6 t	P	(Australia) Daniel Ricciardo	4^{F}	Ret	1^{F}	Ret	5^{F}	1^{P}	4	4	Ret	5	Ret	4^{F}	Ret	Ret	6	6	4	Ret	Ret^{P}	4	4	419	3rd
2018	RB14	TAG Heuer 1.6 V6 t	P	(Netherlands) Max Verstappen	6	Ret	5	Ret	3	9^{F}	3^{F}	2	1	15^{†}	4	Ret	3	5	2	5	3	2	1	2	3	419	3rd
2019	RB15	Honda RA619H 1.6 V6 t	P		AUS	BHR	CHN	AZE	ESP	MON	CAN	FRA	AUT	GBR	GER	HUN	BEL	ITA	SIN	RUS	JPN	MEX	USA	BRA	ABU	417	3rd
2019	RB15	Honda RA619H 1.6 V6 t	P	(France) Pierre Gasly	11	8	6^{F}	Ret	6	5^{F}	8	10	7	4	14^{†}	6										417	3rd
2019	RB15	Honda RA619H 1.6 V6 t	P	(Thailand) Alexander Albon													5	6	6	5	4	5	5	14	6	417	3rd
2019	RB15	Honda RA619H 1.6 V6 t	P	(Netherlands) Max Verstappen	3	4	4	4	3	4	5	4	1^{F}	5	1^{F}	2^{P}^{F}	Ret	8	3	4	Ret	6	3	1^{P}	2	417	3rd

=== 2020s ===
Key

Key
Colour	Result
Gold	Winner
Silver	Second place
Bronze	Third place
Green	Other points position
Blue	Other classified position
Blue	Not classified, finished (NC)
Purple	Not classified, retired (Ret)
Red	Did not qualify (DNQ)
Black	Disqualified (DSQ)
White	Did not start (DNS)
White	Race cancelled (C)
Blank	Did not practice (DNP)
Blank	Excluded (EX)
Blank	Did not arrive (DNA)
Blank	Withdrawn (WD)
Blank	Did not enter (empty cell)
Annotation	Meaning
P	Pole position
F	Fastest lap
Superscript number	Points-scoring position in sprint

Year	Chassis	Engine	Tyres	Drivers	1	2	3	4	5	6	7	8	9	10	11	12	13	14	15	16	17	18	19	20	21	22	23	24	Points	WCC
2020	RB16	Honda RA620H 1.6 V6 t	P		AUT	STY	HUN	GBR	70A	ESP	BEL	ITA	TUS	RUS	EIF	POR	EMI	TUR	BHR	SKH	ABU								319	2nd
2020	RB16	Honda RA620H 1.6 V6 t	P	(Thailand) Alexander Albon	13†	4	5	8	5	8	6	15	3	10	Ret	12	15	7	3	6	4								319	2nd
2020	RB16	Honda RA620H 1.6 V6 t	P	(Netherlands) Max Verstappen	Ret	3	2	2^{F}	1	2	3	Ret	Ret	2	2^{F}	3	Ret	6	2^{F}	Ret	1^{P}								319	2nd
2021	RB16B	Honda RA621H 1.6 V6 t	P		BHR	EMI	POR	ESP	MON	AZE	FRA	STY	AUT	GBR	HUN	BEL	NED	ITA	RUS	TUR	USA	MXC	SAP	QAT	SAU	ABU			585.5	2nd
2021	RB16B	Honda RA621H 1.6 V6 t	P	(Mexico) Sergio Pérez	5	11	4	5	4	1	3	4	6	16^{F}	Ret	19	8	5	9	3	3	3	4^{F}	4	Ret	15†			585.5	2nd
2021	RB16B	Honda RA621H 1.6 V6 t	P	(Netherlands) Max Verstappen	2^{P}	1	2	2^{F}	1	18†^{F}	1^{P}^{F}	1^{P}	1^{P}^{F}	Ret^{1 P}	9	1^{P}^{‡}	1^{P}	Ret^{2 P}	2	2	1^{P}	1	2^{2}	2^{F}	2	1^{P}^{F}			585.5	2nd
2022	RB18	Red Bull RBPTH001 1.6 V6 t	P		BHR	SAU	AUS	EMI	MIA	ESP	MON	AZE	CAN	GBR	AUT	FRA	HUN	BEL	NED	ITA	SIN	JPN	USA	MXC	SAP	ABU			759	1st
2022	RB18	Red Bull RBPTH001 1.6 V6 t	P	(Mexico) Sergio Pérez	18†	4^{P}	2	2^{3}	4	2^{F}	1	2^{F}	Ret	2	Ret^{5}	4	5	2	5	6^{F}	1	2	4	3	7^{5}	3			759	1st
2022	RB18	Red Bull RBPTH001 1.6 V6 t	P	(Netherlands) Max Verstappen	19†	1	Ret	1^{P 1 F}	1^{F}	1	3	1	1^{P}	7	2^{P 1 F}	1	1	1^{F}	1^{P}^{F}	1	7	1^{P}	1	1^{P}	6^{4}	1^{P}			759	1st
2023	RB19	Honda RBPTH001 1.6 V6 t	P		BHR	SAU	AUS	AZE	MIA	MON	ESP	CAN	AUT	GBR	HUN	BEL	NED	ITA	SIN	JPN	QAT	USA	MXC	SAP	LVG	ABU			860	1st
2023	RB19	Honda RBPTH001 1.6 V6 t	P	(Mexico) Sergio Pérez	2	1^{P}	5^{F}	1^{1}	2^{P}	16	4	6^{F}	3^{2}	6	3	2	4	2	8	Ret	10	4^{5}	Ret	4^{3}	3	4			860	1st
2023	RB19	Honda RBPTH001 1.6 V6 t	P	(Netherlands) Max Verstappen	1^{P}	2^{F}	1^{P}	2^{3}	1^{F}	1^{P}	1^{P}^{F}	1^{P}	1^{P 1 F}	1^{P}^{F}	1^{F}	1^{1}	1^{P}	1	5	1^{P}^{F}	1^{P 2 F}	1^{1}	1	1^{P 1}	1	1^{P}^{F}			860	1st
2024	RB20	Honda RBPTH002 1.6 V6 t	P		BHR	SAU	AUS	JPN	CHN	MIA	EMI	MON	CAN	ESP	AUT	GBR	HUN	BEL	NED	ITA	AZE	SIN	USA	MXC	SAP	LVG	QAT	ABU	589	3rd
2024	RB20	Honda RBPTH002 1.6 V6 t	P	(Mexico) Sergio Pérez	2	2	5	2	3^{3}	4^{3}	8	Ret	Ret	8	7^{8}	17	7	7^{F}	6	8	17†	10	7	17	11^{8}	10	Ret	Ret	589	3rd
2024	RB20	Honda RBPTH002 1.6 V6 t	P	(Netherlands) Max Verstappen	1^{P}^{F}	1^{P}	Ret^{P}	1^{P}^{F}	1^{1 P}	2^{1 P}	1^{P}	6	1	1	5^{1 P}	2	5	4	2	6	5	2	3^{1}	6	1^{4 F}	5	1^{8}	6	589	3rd
2025	RB21	Honda RBPTH003 1.6 V6 t	P		AUS	CHN	JPN	BHR	SAU	MIA	EMI	MON	ESP	CAN	AUT	GBR	BEL	HUN	NED	ITA	AZE	SIN	USA	MXC	SAP	LVG	QAT	ABU	451	3rd
2025	RB21	Honda RBPTH003 1.6 V6 t	P	(New Zealand) Liam Lawson	Ret	12																							451	3rd
2025	RB21	Honda RBPTH003 1.6 V6 t	P	(Japan) Yuki Tsunoda			12	9	Ret	10^{6}	10	17	13	12	16	15	13	17	9	13	6	12	7^{7}	11	17	12	10^{5}	14	451	3rd
2025	RB21	Honda RBPTH003 1.6 V6 t	P	(Netherlands) Max Verstappen	2	4^{3}	1^{P}	6	2^{P}	4^{P}	1^{F}	4	10	2	Ret	5^{P}	4^{1}	9	2	1^{P}	1^{P}^{F}	2	1^{1 P}	3	3^{4}	1^{F}	1^{4}	1^{P}	451	3rd
2026	RB22	Red Bull Ford DM01 1.6 V6 t	P		AUS	CHN	JPN	MIA	CAN	MON	BCN	AUT	GBR	BEL	HUN	NED	ITA	ESP	AZE	BHR	SIN	USA	MXC	SAP	LVG	QAT	ABU		204*	4th*
2026	RB22	Red Bull Ford DM01 1.6 V6 t	P	(France) Isack Hadjar	Ret	8	12	Ret	5	3	6	6	5	6	6														204*	4th*
2026	RB22	Red Bull Ford DM01 1.6 V6 t	P	(Netherlands) Max Verstappen	6^{F}	Ret	8	5^{5}	3^{7}	Ret	4	2	20†^{6}	3	2	Ret^{6}	3												204*	4th*
2026	RB22	Red Bull Ford DM01 1.6 V6 t	P	(New Zealand) Liam Lawson												7	14												204*	4th*

Notes

- * – Season still in progress.
- ^{†} – The driver did not finish the Grand Prix, but was classified as he completed over 90% of the race distance.
- ^{‡} – Half points awarded as less than 75% of race distance was completed.
