= Red Bull Racing RB14 =

2018 Formula One racing car

Red Bull RB14
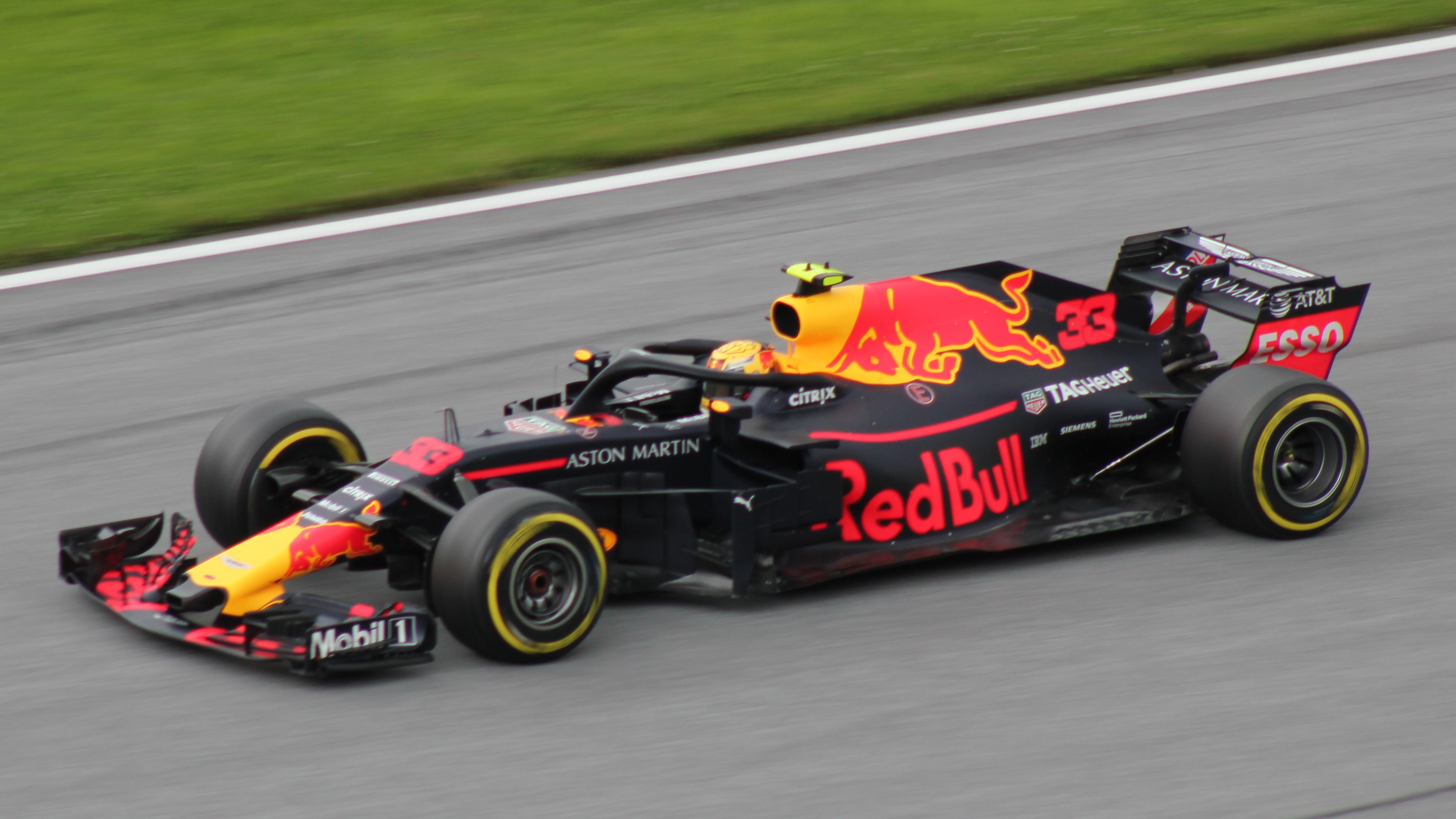
- Max Verstappen driving an RB14 at the Austrian Grand Prix
- Category: Formula One
- Constructor: Red Bull Racing
- Designers: Adrian Newey (Chief Technical Officer); Rob Marshall (Chief Engineering Officer); Rob Gray (Chief Designer); Steve Winstanley (Deputy Chief Designer, Composites and Structures); David Worner (Deputy Chief Designer, Mechanics and Suspension); Pierre Waché (Chief Engineer, Performance); Ben Waterhouse (Deputy Head of Performance Engineering); Dan Fallows (Head of Aerodynamics); Craig Skinner (Deputy Head of Aerodynamics)
- Predecessor: Red Bull RB13
- Successor: Red Bull RB15

Technical specifications
- Chassis: Composite monocoque structure
- Suspension (front): Aluminium alloy uprights, carbon fibre composite double wishbones with pushrods, springs, anti-roll bar and dampers
- Suspension (rear): Aluminium alloy uprights, carbon fibre composite double wishbones with pullrods, springs, anti-roll bar and dampers
- Engine: Renault R.E.18 (rebadged as TAG Heuer F1-2018), 1.6 L (98 cu in) direct injection V6 turbocharged engine limited to 15,000 RPM in a mid-mounted, rear-wheel drive layout
- Electric motor: Renault (rebadged as TAG Heuer) kinetic and thermal energy recovery systems
- Transmission: Red Bull Technology Eight-speed gearbox, longitudinally mounted with hydraulic system for power shift and clutch operation
- Power: 900 hp
- Fuel: Esso/Mobil Synergy race fuels
- Lubricants: Mobil 1
- Brakes: Brembo calipers
- Tyres: Pirelli P Zero (dry); Pirelli Cinturato (wet); OZ forged magnesium wheels: 13"

Competition history
- Notable entrants: Aston Martin Red Bull Racing
- Notable drivers: 3. (Australia) Daniel Ricciardo; 33. (Netherlands) Max Verstappen
- Debut: 2018 Australian Grand Prix
- First win: 2018 Chinese Grand Prix
- Last win: 2018 Mexican Grand Prix
- Last event: 2018 Abu Dhabi Grand Prix
Races	Wins	Podiums	Poles	F/Laps
21	4	13	2	6

The Red Bull RB14 was a Formula One racing car designed and constructed by Red Bull Racing to compete during the 2018 FIA Formula One World Championship. The car was driven by Daniel Ricciardo and Max Verstappen, and made its competitive début at the 2018 Australian Grand Prix. Like its predecessors the RB12 and RB13, the RB14 used a Renault engine badged as a TAG Heuer.

The RB14 was the last car built by Red Bull Racing to use customer Renault engines as the team switched to Honda power in 2019.

== Design and development ==
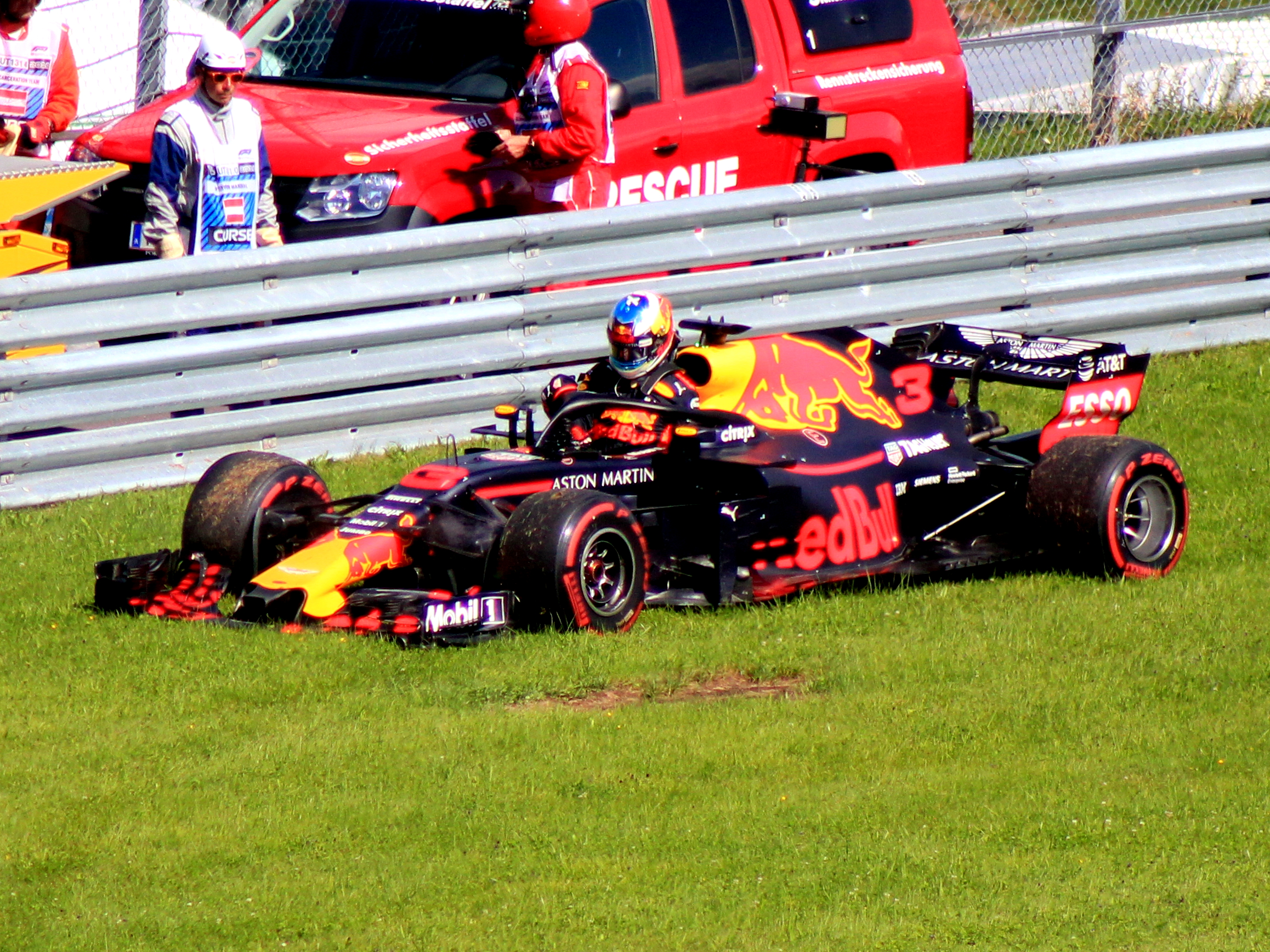
Ricciardo exiting his retired RB14 during the Austrian Grand Prix. Despite its race-winning pace, the car suffered nine mechanical retirements over the course of the season — more than any other constructor.

Following difficult pre-season tests in 2016 and 2017 in which the team attended the first tests with older-model cars, Red Bull announced that they would launch the RB14 earlier in the year than they had with the RB12 and RB13. Where previous cars had been delayed to allow the team more time to develop the chassis in their factory, the team brought the launch of the RB14 forward to gather more on-track data. Team principal Christian Horner justified the decision by revealing that analysis of the team's performances in 2016 and 2017 showed that while the chassis were competitive by the end of the season, the decision to delay their respective launches had resulted in an uncompetitive car at the start of the championship.

The RB14 made its public debut in February. Daniel Ricciardo completed a shakedown of the car at the Silverstone Circuit one week before pre-season testing began.

== Livery ==
Ricciardo and Verstappen competed in the United States Grand Prix wearing special cowboy-styled race suits as a special tribute to Austin and Texas.

== Complete Formula One results ==
(key) (results in bold indicate pole position; results in italics indicate fastest lap)

Year	Entrant	Engine	Tyres	Drivers	Grands Prix																					Points	WCC
Year	Entrant	Engine	Tyres	Drivers	AUS	BHR	CHN	AZE	ESP	MON	CAN	FRA	AUT	GBR	GER	HUN	BEL	ITA	SIN	RUS	JPN	USA	MEX	BRA	ABU	Points	WCC
2018	Aston Martin Red Bull Racing	TAG Heuer F1-2018	**P**	(Australia) Daniel Ricciardo	4	Ret	1	Ret	5	**1**	4	4	Ret	5	Ret	4	Ret	Ret	6	6	4	Ret	**Ret**	4	4	**419**	**3rd**
2018	Aston Martin Red Bull Racing	TAG Heuer F1-2018	**P**	(Netherlands) Max Verstappen	6	Ret	5	Ret	3	9	3	2	1	15^{†}	4	Ret	3	5	2	5	3	2	1	2	3	**419**	**3rd**

^{†} Driver failed to finish the race, but was classified as they had completed over 90% of the race distance.
