= Behling =

Behling is a surname. Notable people with the surname include:

- Christoph Behling, Swiss designer
- Clarence Behling (1916–1994), Canadian ice hockey player
- Guido Behling (born 1964), German sprint canoeist
- Michael Evans Behling (born 1996), American actor
- Robert Behling (born 1991), German slalom canoeist

== See also ==
- Mount Behling, a mountain of the Ross Dependency, Antarctica
