= Red Bull RB13 =

Formula One racing car

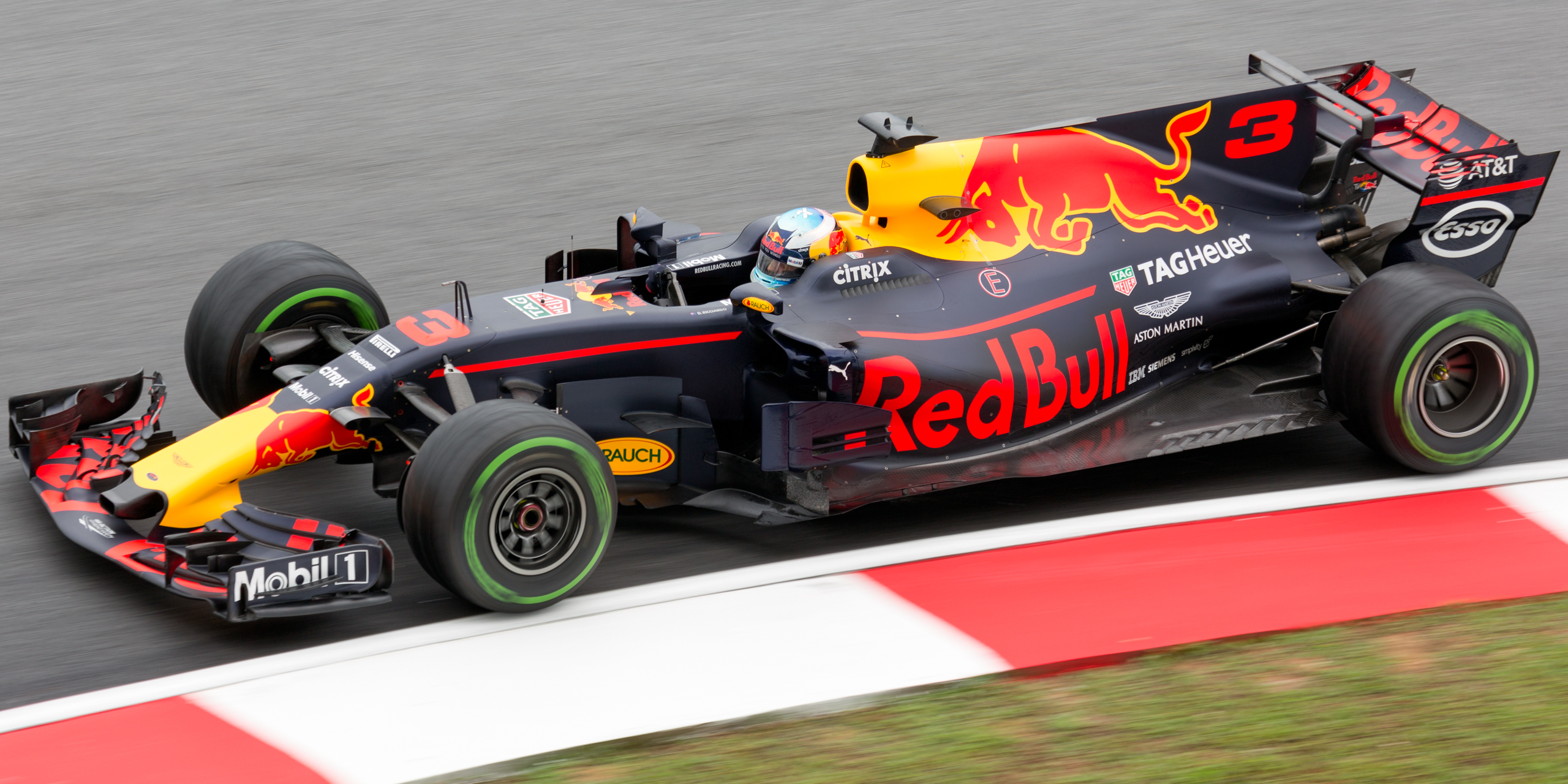
- Daniel Ricciardo driving the RB13 at the Malaysian Grand Prix
- Category: Formula One
- Constructor: Red Bull Racing
- Designers: Adrian Newey (Chief Technical Officer); Rob Marshall (Chief Engineering Officer); Rob Gray (Chief Designer); Steve Winstanley (Deputy Chief Designer, Composites and Structures); David Worner (Deputy Chief Designer, Mechanics and Suspension); Pierre Waché (Chief Engineer, Performance); Dan Fallows (Head of Aerodynamics); Craig Skinner (Deputy Head of Aerodynamics); Stefano Sordo (Head of Aerodynamic Performance)
- Predecessor: Red Bull RB12
- Successor: Red Bull RB14

Technical specifications
- Chassis: Composite monocoque structure
- Suspension (front): Aluminium alloy uprights, carbon fibre composite double wishbones with pushrods, springs, anti-roll bar and dampers
- Suspension (rear): Same as front
- Engine: Renault R.E.17 (rebadged as TAG Heuer F1-2017) 1.6 L (98 cu in) direct injection V6 turbocharged engine, limited to 15,000 rpm in a mid-mounted, rear-wheel drive layout
- Electric motor: Kinetic and thermal energy recovery systems
- Transmission: Eight-speed gearbox, longitudinally mounted with hydraulic system for power shift and clutch operation.
- Power: 900 bhp (671kw)
- Fuel: ExxonMobil Synergy race fuels (Esso, Exxon and Mobil)
- Lubricants: Mobil 1
- Brakes: Brembo
- Tyres: Pirelli P Zero (dry); Pirelli Cinturato (wet); O.Z. Racing wheels

Competition history
- Notable entrants: Red Bull Racing
- Notable drivers: 3. (Australia) Daniel Ricciardo; 33. (Netherlands) Max Verstappen
- Debut: 2017 Australian Grand Prix
- First win: 2017 Azerbaijan Grand Prix
- Last win: 2017 Mexican Grand Prix
- Last event: 2017 Abu Dhabi Grand Prix
Races	Wins	Podiums	Poles	F/Laps
20	3	13	0	2

The Red Bull RB13 is a Formula One racing car designed and constructed by Red Bull Racing to compete during the 2017 FIA Formula One World Championship. The car was driven by Daniel Ricciardo and Max Verstappen. It made its competitive debut at the 2017 Australian Grand Prix.

It is the first British-based foreign F1 car to utilize ExxonMobil fuel and lubricants since 2013, regarded as such due to its constructor Red Bull Racing operating under an Austrian license while simultaneously operating a base in Milton Keynes, along with Toro Rosso STR12 based in Faenza. It is also the first Red Bull F1 car featured with a shark fin since the championship-winning RB6 in 2010.

== Competition history ==
The pre-season testing proved that the car was a long way behind the two leading teams, Ferrari and Mercedes, in both pace and reliability. The team opted for a low drag design philosophy for 2017, similar to the Williams team.

=== Opening rounds ===
The Australian Grand Prix proved that the team was the 3rd quickest behind Ferrari and Mercedes. Verstappen qualified in 5th, almost 1.3 seconds off Lewis Hamilton's pole position time and almost half a second down on Kimi Räikkönen in the Ferrari. Ricciardo meanwhile, crashed during his opening run in Q3 and received a 5-place grid penalty for changing his car's gearbox. In the race, Verstappen held his position and finished in 5th but misery continued for his teammate at his home Grand Prix as Ricciardo's car broke down during the installation laps and was forced to start 2 laps down as his mechanics worked to repair his car. Ricciardo later retired on lap 26 after his engine failed. He rated it as one of his worst race weekends in his whole career.

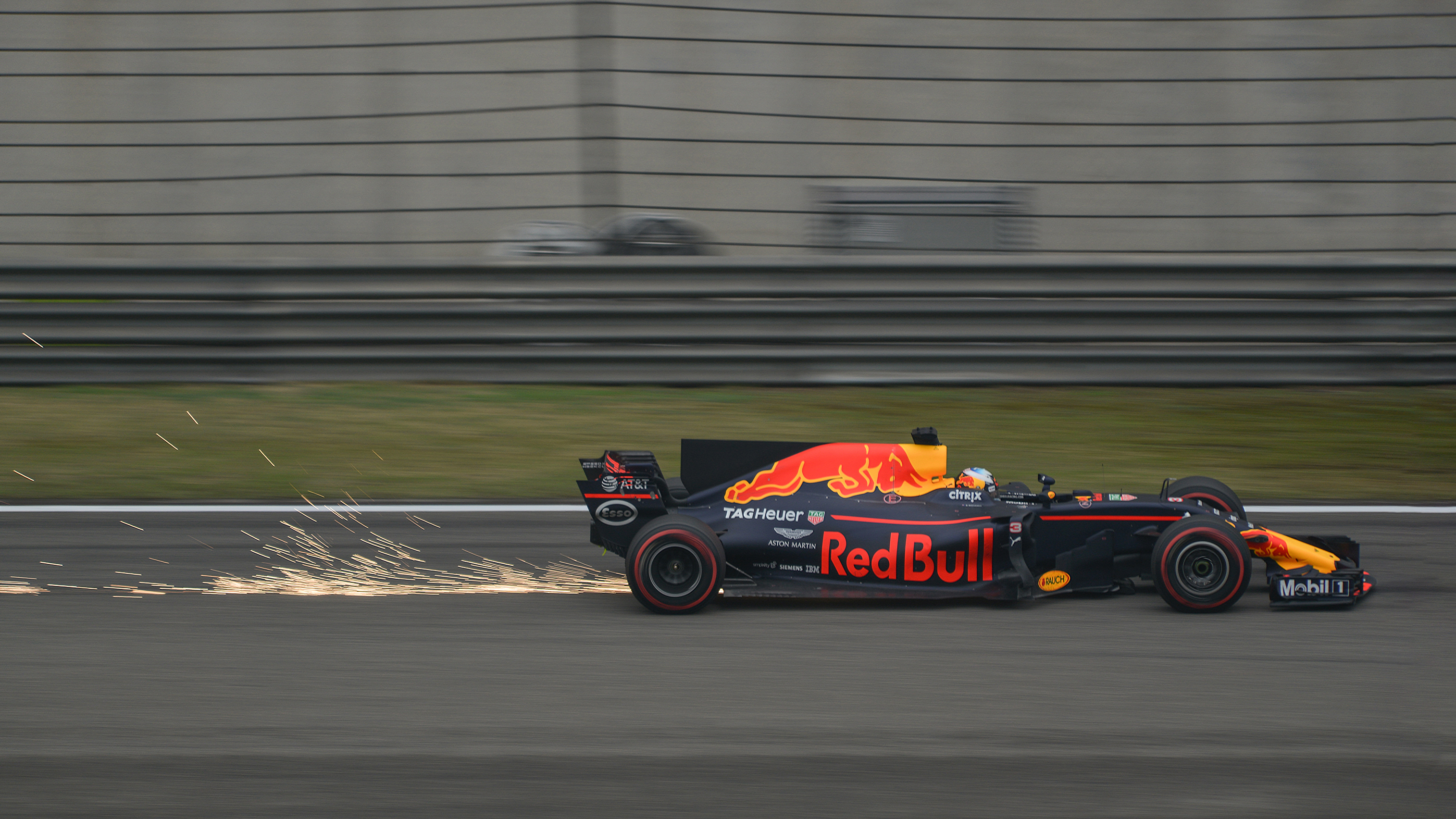
Ricciardo driving the RB13 at the Chinese Grand Prix

In China, Ricciardo left his Australian Grand Prix weekend's woes behind him and qualified in 5th behind a similar top 4 as in Australia. Verstappen meanwhile failed to get into Q2 as his car entered into an engine mode which lowered the power and he qualified in 19th. The race was much better for Verstappen as he started from 16th after Romain Grosjean and Jolyon Palmer received penalties for failing to slow down under yellow flags caused by Antonio Giovinazzi who crashed on the final corner during Q1. Giovinazzi himself received a penalty for replacing his car's gearbox. Under the semi-dry conditions, Verstappen made a brilliant start which saw him climb up 7 places by the end of the first lap; Ricciardo meanwhile overtook Räikkönen into the first corner on lap 1. Lance Stroll's crash on lap 1 and Giovinazzi's crash on lap 4 caused the Virtual Safety Car and Safety Car respectively. This allowed Verstappen and Ricciardo to eclipse Ferrari's Sebastian Vettel and Mercedes' Valtteri Bottas in the pits. Verstappen finished in 3rd bringing Red Bull its first podium in 2017 ahead of Ricciardo in 4th.

The Bahrain Grand Prix saw Ricciardo outqualify Räikkönen for 4th, who undoubtedly was in a quicker car, and Verstappen qualified in 6th. Ricciardo eventually lost out to Räikkönen's quicker Ferrari and finished behind him in 5th and Verstappen retired on lap 11 due to a brake failure.

=== European and Canadian rounds ===
At the Spanish Grand Prix, the team introduced a host of new parts to the car as a bid to close the gap to Ferrari and Mercedes. Verstappen and Ricciardo claimed that the upgrades had worked and they could find more speed in the high speed corners. Verstappen qualified in 5th ahead of Ricciardo in 6th. During the race, Verstappen retired on the opening lap after colliding with Ferrari's Räikkönen forcing the latter to retire from the race; Ricciardo meanwhile had an easy drive and finished 3rd behind Hamilton and Vettel, more than a minute behind the latter and was the only other driver to finish on the lead lap.

At the Monaco Grand Prix, Red Bull introduced more upgrades. Verstappen qualified in 4th ahead of Ricciardo in 5th. During the race Verstappen was told to pit before Ricciardo to give him the advantage over his teammate. But Verstappen engaged in a battle with Mercedes' Bottas which resulted both of them losing time to Ricciardo. Ricciardo made his one and only pit stop and managed to overcut both Bottas and Verstappen and came out in 3rd. Ricciardo finished third ahead of Bottas and Verstappen finished in 5th. Verstappen showed his frustration over the team radio after Ricciardo managed to overcut him in the pits.

At the Canadian Grand Prix, Verstappen outqualified Ricciardo for the third time in a row as they lined up on the third row of the grid. Verstappen made a brilliant start managing to overtake 3 cars and ended up in 2nd before the first corner. But Verstappen had another frustrating race as he retired from 2nd after suffering from a battery failure. Ricciardo managed to defend from the two Force India cars for the whole race and finished in 3rd for the third time in three races.

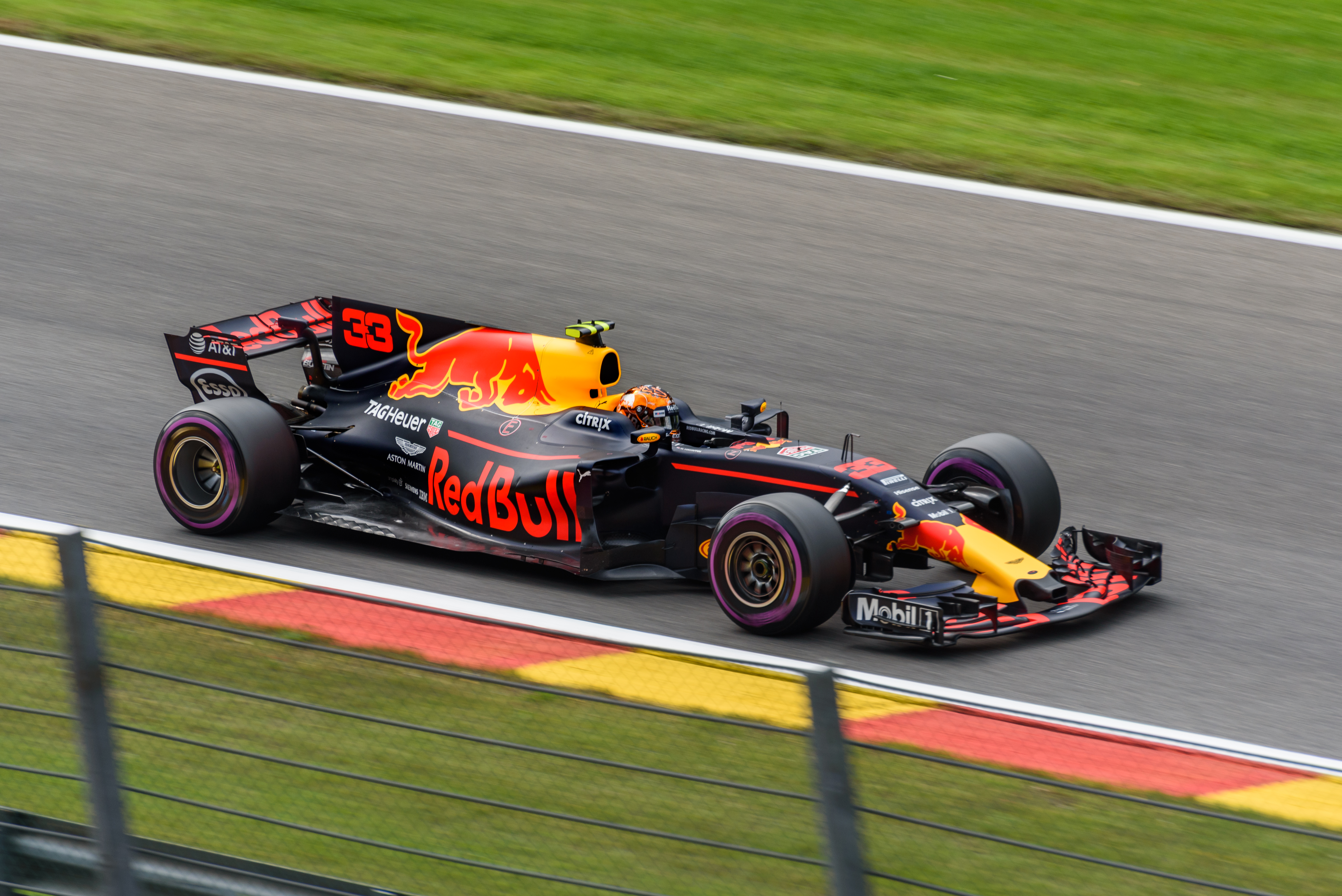
Max Verstappen at the Belgian Grand Prix

At the Azerbaijan Grand Prix, Verstappen qualified in 5th. Ricciardo meanwhile, crashed on his first run in Q3 which forced him to start from 10th. On an occasion which saw a lot of collisions, 3 safety cars and a red flag, Ricciardo took an unlikely win even after falling down to 17th after making a precautionary pit-stop to remove debris from his car's radiator. His win was also made possible after all the cars which qualified ahead of him except Williams's Lance Stroll, had an incident or a penalty issued. He won the race three seconds ahead of Mercedes' Valtteri Bottas who also made a comeback drive after falling a lap behind the leaders because of an opening lap crash; Verstappen's bad luck continued after he retired from the race after only 12 laps due to an engine failure.

== Complete Formula One results ==
(key) (results in bold indicate pole position; results in italics indicate fastest lap)

Year	Entrant	Engine	Tyres	Drivers	Grands Prix																				Points	WCC
Year	Entrant	Engine	Tyres	Drivers	AUS	CHN	BHR	RUS	ESP	MON	CAN	AZE	AUT	GBR	HUN	BEL	ITA	SIN	MAL	JPN	USA	MEX	BRA	ABU	Points	WCC
2017	Red Bull Racing	TAG Heuer F1-2017	**P**																							
2017	Red Bull Racing	TAG Heuer F1-2017	**P**	(Australia) Daniel Ricciardo	Ret	4	5	Ret	3	3	3	1	3	5	Ret	3	4	2	3	3	Ret	Ret	6	Ret	**368**	**3rd**
2017	Red Bull Racing	TAG Heuer F1-2017	**P**	(Netherlands) Max Verstappen	5	3	Ret	5	Ret	5	Ret	Ret	Ret	4	5	Ret	10	Ret	1	2	4	1	5	5	**368**	**3rd**

Notes

- † – Driver failed to finish the race, but was classified as they had completed greater than 90% of the race distance.
