= Christoph Behling =

Swiss product designer

Christoph Behling is a product designer and the founder of Christoph Behling Design, a London-based product design studio established in 2004. Behling is also the founding director of SolarLab Research & Design, a solar-powered transport and architecture company.

== Biography ==
Behling was born in 1970 in Geneva, Switzerland and raised in Germany. He completed a diploma in Industrial Design in 1995 at the Art Academy in Stuttgart.

== Career ==
Behling started his career with design practices in Tokyo and London. In 2004, he founded both Christoph Behling Design and SolarLab Research & Design. He was a teacher of the Design Products course at the Royal College of Art from 2005 to 2009 and is the curator of the annual Sustain Exhibition at the RCA.

In 2006, Behling launched Serpentine SolarShuttle, a solar-powered boat that can feed unused electricity back into the national grid. The boat won several design awards.

Behling has also worked as a product designer for companies communication technology, fashion, luxury goods, watches, water sanitation and transport. He has been the lead designer for TAG Heuer since 2004.

Since 2007, Behling has also worked as the creative director of the Atelier Group, a Paris-based mobile telecommunications communications company. He has collaborated with Geberit, a European sanitary manufacturer, to reduce water consumption in homes.

== Exhibitions ==
- 2000 World Expo, Hanover, Germany and Lisbon, Portugal
- 2002 The Cooper-Hewitt National Design Museum, New York
- 2006 The Science Museum, London
- 2006 Royal College of Art, London
- 2007 So Watt! Exhibition: Du Design dans l’Energie, Paris
- 2008 Design of the Year, Design Museum, London
- 2009 1.618 Sustainable Luxury Fair, Palais de Tokyo, Paris
- 2009 L'Objet du Design, Saint Etienne
- 2010 Sustainable Futures, Design Museum, London

== Awards ==
Product Design

- 2011 Salon International de Alta Relojeria (SIAR)(Best Concept Watch AG Heuer Mikrotimer Flying 1000)
- 2011 Grand Prix d'Horlogerie de Genève (Best Sports Watch TAG Heuer Mikrotimer Flying 1000)
- 2010 Grand Prix d'Horlogerie de Genève (La Petite Aiguille TAG Heuer 1887 Chronograph)
- 2009 Red Dot Award Grand Carrera Calibre 36 RS Caliper Chronograph)
- 2009 Red Dot Award (TAG Heuer Aquaracer 500M Calibre 5
- 2009 Australian International Design Award(TAG Heuer Meridiist mobile phone)
- 2009 Fortune Design Award, China (TAG Heuer Grand Carrera Calibre 36RS Caliper Chronograph)
- 2008 Salon International de Alta Relojeria (SIAR)(Best Chronograph of the Year Grand Carrera Calibre 36RS Caliper Chronograph)
- 2008 Grand Prix d'Horlogerie de Genève (Ultimate Sports Inspired Timepiece TAG Heuer Grand Carrera Calibre 36RS Caliper Chronograph)
- 2007 iF Design Award TAG Heuer Monaco Calibre 360 LS Concept Chronograph)
- 2006 Red Dot Award (TAG Heuer Calibre 360 Concept)
- 2006 Grand Prix d’Horlogerie de Genève (Best Sports Watch TAG Heuer Carrera Calibre 360)
- 2006 iF Design Award (TAG Heuer Professional Golf Watch designed in collaboration with Tiger Woods)
- 2005 Grand Prix d’Horlogerie de Genève (Best Ladies Watch TAG Heuer Diamond Fiction)
- 2005 Red Dot Award (TAG Heuer Monaco V4 Concept)
- 2005 Wallpaper Design Award (Best Watch TAG Heuer Monaco V4 Concept)

SolarLab Research + Design

- 2006 Responsible Tourism Award (Highly Commended Best Transport Initiative Serpentine SolarShuttle)
- 2007 CondeNast Design & Innovation Award Winner Sustainable Category Serpentine SolarShuttle)
- 2007 Travel & Leisure Design Award (Best Transportation Serpentine SolarShuttle)
