= TAG Heuer =

Swiss luxury watchmaker

TAG Heuer S.A.
- Type: Subsidiary
- Industry: Watchmaking
- Founded: 1860; 166 years ago (as Uhrenmanufaktur Heuer AG); Saint-Imier, Switzerland
- Founder: Edouard Heuer
- Headquarters: La Chaux-de-Fonds, Switzerland
- Area served: Worldwide
- Key people: Béatrice Goasglas (CEO)
- Products: Watches and accessories
- Parent: LVMH
- Website: tagheuer.com

TAG Heuer S.A., founded Heuer AG (Note: Legal name Uhrenmanufaktur Heuer AG.) (/ˌtæɡ ˈhɔɪ.ər/ TAG HOY-ər) is a Swiss luxury watchmaker. Heuer was founded in 1860 by Edouard Heuer in St-Imier, Switzerland. In 1985, Techniques d'Avant Garde (TAG) purchased a majority stake in the company, forming TAG Heuer. In 1999, French luxury goods conglomerate LVMH bought nearly 100 percent of the Swiss company. The name TAG Heuer combines the initials of "Techniques d'Avant Garde" and the founder's surname. Although best known for its chronographs, it has also manufactured stopwatches.

== History ==
TAG Heuer is based in La Chaux-de-Fonds, Switzerland, and is led by CEO Frédéric Arnault. Jack Heuer, great-grandson of the founder, is the honorary chairman. TAG Heuer maintains a watchmaking workshop in Cornol, Switzerland, and a watchmaking factory in La Chaux-de-Fonds. TAG Heuer's slogan is "Swiss Avant-Garde Since 1860".

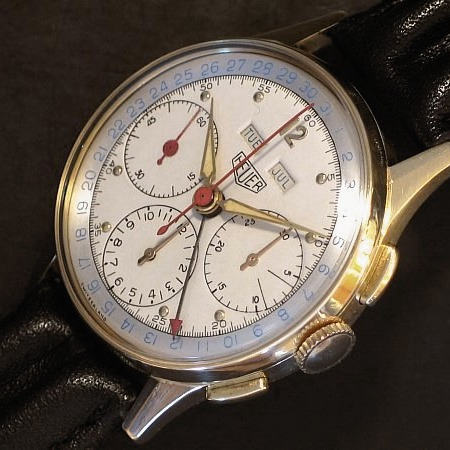
Heuer triple-date chronograph (circa 1955)

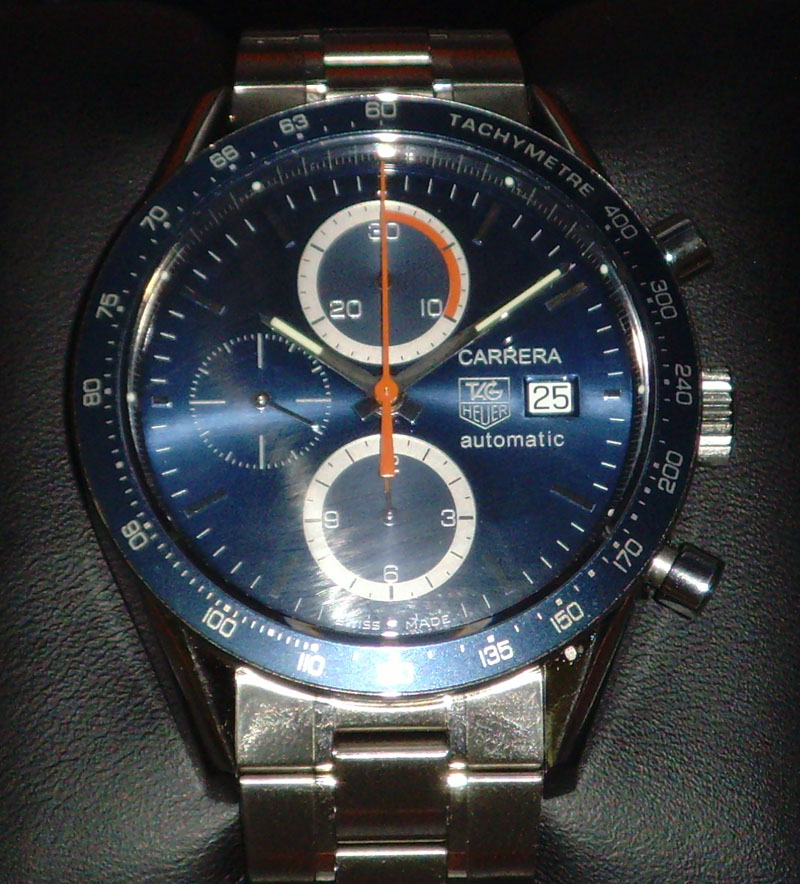
TAG Heuer Carrera automatic chronograph with tachymeter

=== 1860 through 1880s ===
In 1860 Edouard Heuer founded Uhrenmanufaktur Heuer AG (English: Heuer Watchmaking Inc.) in St-Imier, Switzerland.

Edouard Heuer patented his first chronograph in 1882 and in 1887 patented an "oscillating pinion" still used by major watchmakers of mechanical chronographs.

=== 1910s ===
In 1911, Heuer received a patent for the "Time of Trip", the first dashboard chronograph. Designed for use in automobiles and aircraft, two large hands mounted from the center pinion indicate the time of day, as on a traditional clock. A small pair of hands mounted at the top of the dial (12 o'clock position) indicates the duration of the trip (up to 12 hours). A top-mounted crown allows the user to set the time; a button mounted in that crown operates the start/stop/reset functions of the "duration of trip" counter.

Heuer introduced its first wrist chronograph in 1914. The crown was at the 12 o'clock position, as these first wrist chronographs were adapted from pocket chronographs. In 1916 Edward Heuer's son, Charles-Auguste, introduced the "Mikrograph", the first stopwatch accurate to 1/100 of a second. This model was soon followed by the "Semikrograph", a stopwatch that offered 1/50 of a second timing, as well as a split-second function (which allows the user to determine the interval between two contestants or events).

=== 1930s and 1940s ===
In 1933, Heuer introduced the "Autavia", a dashboard timer used for automobiles and aviation (whence its name, from "AUTos" and "AVIAtion"). The companion "Hervue" was a clock that could run for eight days without being wound. Over the period from 1935 through the early 1940s, Heuer manufactured chronographs for pilots in the Luftwaffe, known as "Flieger" (pilot) chronographs. The earlier version featured a hinged-back case and one pusher (for start/stop/reset); the later version had a snap-back case and added a second pusher (for time-in and time-out). All these Flieger chronographs had two-registers, with a capacity of 30 minutes."

In the mid-1940s, Heuer expanded its line of chronographs to include two- and three-register models and a three-register chronograph that had a full calendar function (day/date/month). As the highest development of Heuer's chronographs, these "triple calendar" chronographs came in stainless steel and 14, 18, and 22 karat gold cases. Dial colors were white, black, or copper.

=== 1950s ===
In the early-1950s, Heuer produced watches for the American retailer Abercrombie & Fitch. The "Seafarer" and "Auto-Graph" were chronographs produced by Heuer to be sold by Abercrombie & Fitch. The "Seafarers" had special dials—with blue, green, and yellow patterns—that showed the high and low tides. This dial could also be used to track the phases of the moon. Heuer produced a version of the "Seafarer" for sale under the Heuer name, with this model called the "Mareographe". Heuer produced the "Auto-Graph" in 1953 and 1954, which featured a tachymeter scale on the dial and a hand that could be preset to a specific point on the scale. This complication allowed a rally driver or navigator to determine whether the car achieved the desired pace over a measured mile. Advertisements and literature also pointed out that this hand could be rotated to count golf scores or other events.

==== Auto dashboard timers ====
From 1911, Heuer manufactured timepieces to be mounted on the dashboards of automobiles, aircraft, and boats. These clocks and timers included a variety of models designed to address the specific needs of racers and rallyists. In 1958, Heuer introduced a new line of dashboard timepieces, which included the Master Time (8-day clock), the Monte Carlo (12-hour stopwatch), the Super Autavia (full chronograph), Sebring (60-minute, split-second timer), and Auto-Rallye (60-minute stopwatch). Heuer continued to manufacture these dashboard timepieces into the 1980s when Heuer discontinued them. Heuer also introduced timing devices for ski and motor racing events, including Formula One.

=== 1960s ===
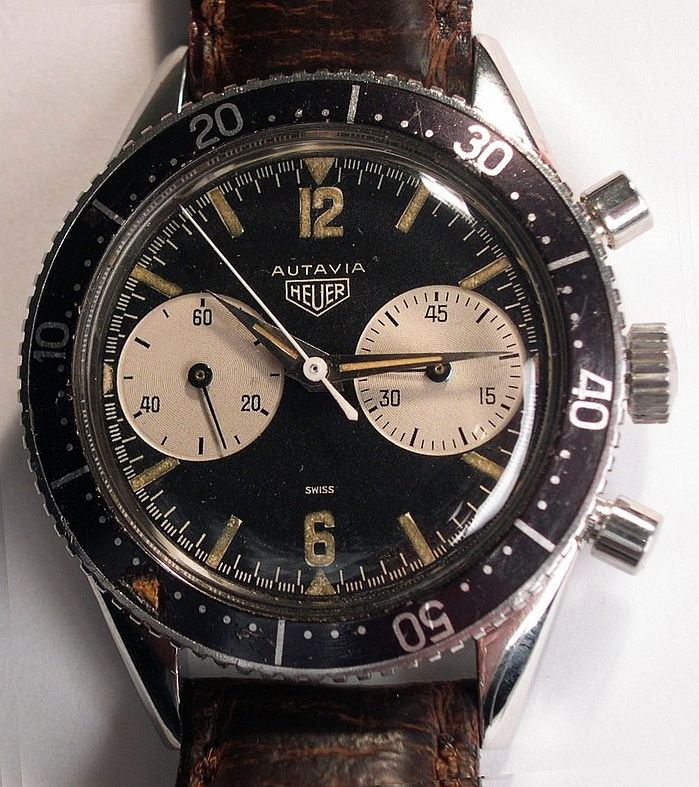
Heuer Autavia (1962)

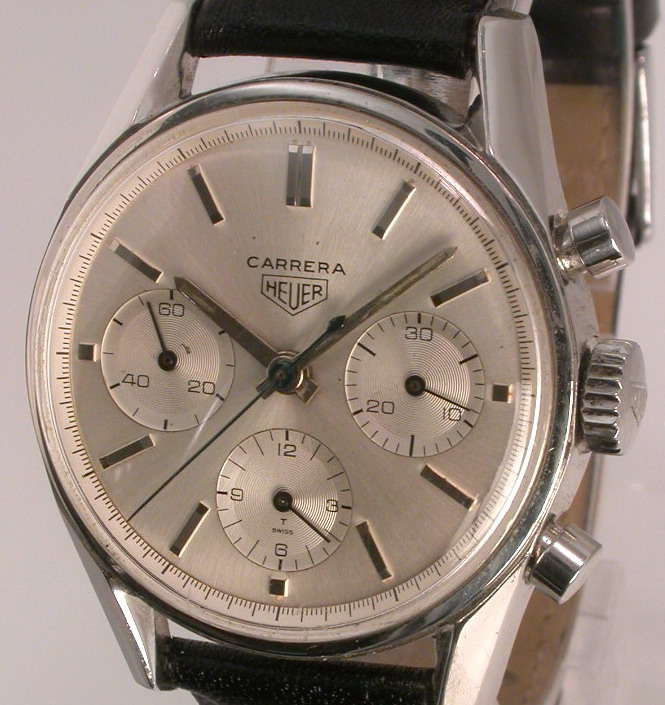
Heuer Carrera (1963)

From the 1950s to the 1970s, Heuers were popular watches among automobile racers, both professionals and amateurs. Heuer was a leading producer of stopwatches and timing equipment, based on the volume of its sales, so it was only natural that racers, their crews and event sponsors began to wear Heuer chronographs. Heuer produced special chronograph versions with the logo of the Indianapolis Motor Speedway, as well as the names or logos of racing teams or sponsors (for example, Shelby Cobra, MG and Champion Sparkplugs).

In 1962, Heuer became the first Swiss watchmaker in space. John Glenn wore a Heuer stopwatch when he piloted the Mercury Atlas 6 spacecraft on the first US crewed space flight to orbit the Earth. This stopwatch was the backup clock for the mission. It was started manually by Glenn 20 seconds into the flight. It is currently on display at the San Diego Air and Space Museum.

The Autavia chronograph was introduced in 1962 and featured a rotating bezel, marked in either hours, minutes, decimal minutes (1/100 minute increments), or with a tachymeter scale. All manual-wind Autavias from the 1960s had a black dial with white registers. Early cases had a screw-back, and later models (from and after 1968) had snap-backs. Heuer had previously used the "Autavia" name for its dashboard timers.

In 1963, Heuer introduced the Carrera chronograph, designed by Jack Heuer, great-grandson of Edouard. The Carrera had a very simple design, with only the registers and applied markers on the dial. The fixed inner bezel is divided into 1/5 second increments. In the 1960s, Carreras were available with a variety of dials, including all-white, all-black, white registers on a black dial, and black registers on a black dial. A three-register, triple calendar version of the Carrera was introduced around 1968.

Most of Heuer chronographs from this period—including the Autavias and Carreras—used movements manufactured by Valjoux, including the Valjoux 72 movement (for a 12-hour chronograph) and the Valjoux 92 movement (for a 30-minute or 45-minute chronograph). The Valjoux 72 movement utilized a "tri-compax" design, with three registers on the dial—one register for the chronograph hours (at the bottom), one register for the chronograph minutes (at the right), and a third register for a continuously running second hand (at the left). The second hand for the chronograph was mounted on the center pinion, along with the time-of-day hands.

Heuer acquired the "Leonidas" brand in the early 1960s, with the combined company marketing watches under the "Heuer-Leonidas" name. One of the designs that Heuer acquired from Leonidas was the "Bundeswehr" chronograph, used by the German air force. These "BWs" feature a "fly-back" mechanism, so that when the chronograph is reset to zero, it immediately begins running again, to time the next segment or event.

==== Automatic chronographs ====
In the mid-1960s, Heuer partnered with Breitling and Hamilton (and in competition with Seiko and Zenith) to introduce an automatic chronograph. These projects were conducted in secret, as none of the competitors wanted the other companies to be aware of their efforts. Heuer-Breitling-Hamilton held press conferences in Geneva and New York, on 3 March 1969 to show their new lines of chronographs.

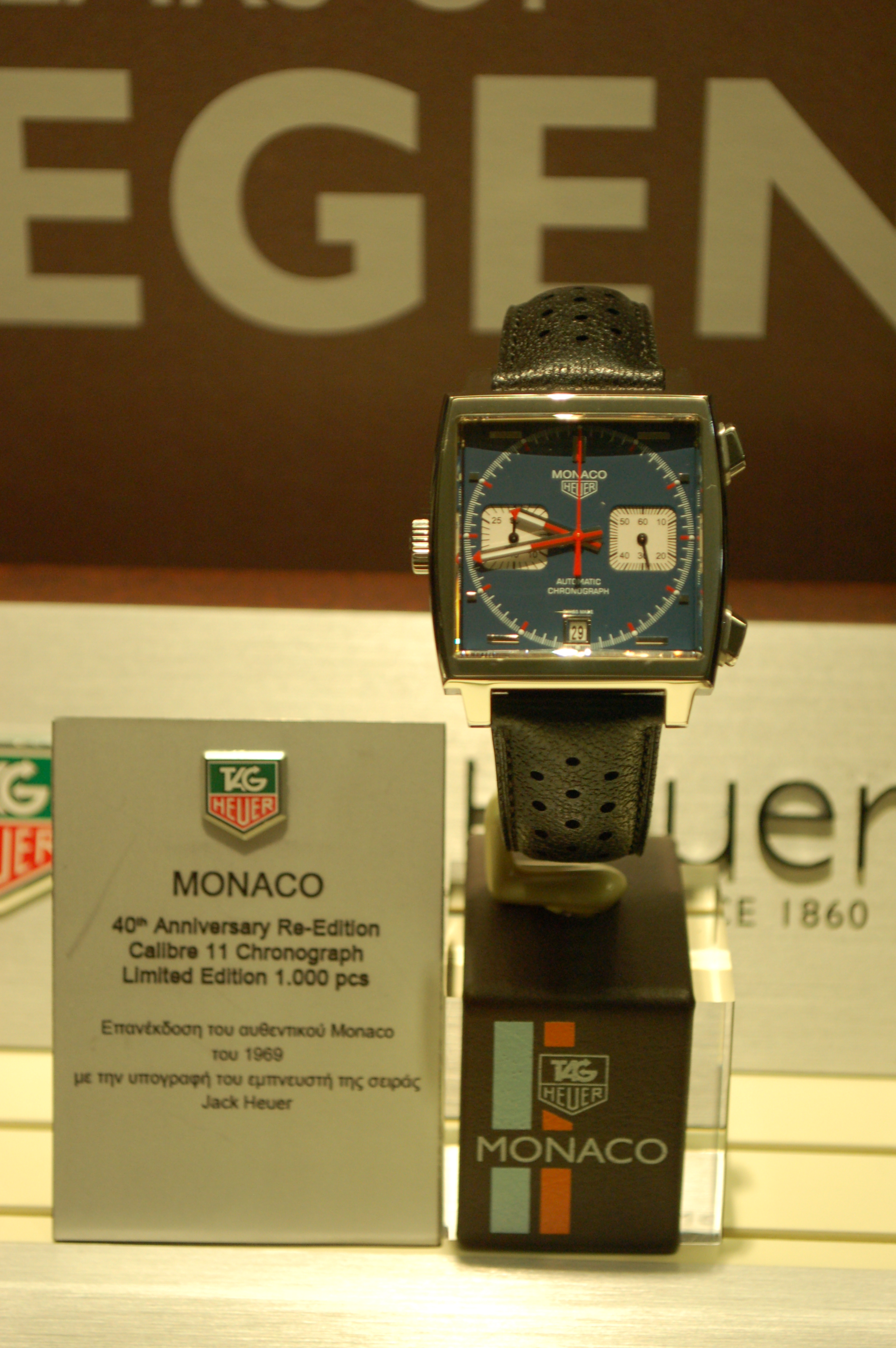
The Heuer Monaco 40th Anniversary re-edition with Calibre 11 (2009) is a limited-edition, contemporary replica of the original 1969 Heuer Monaco.

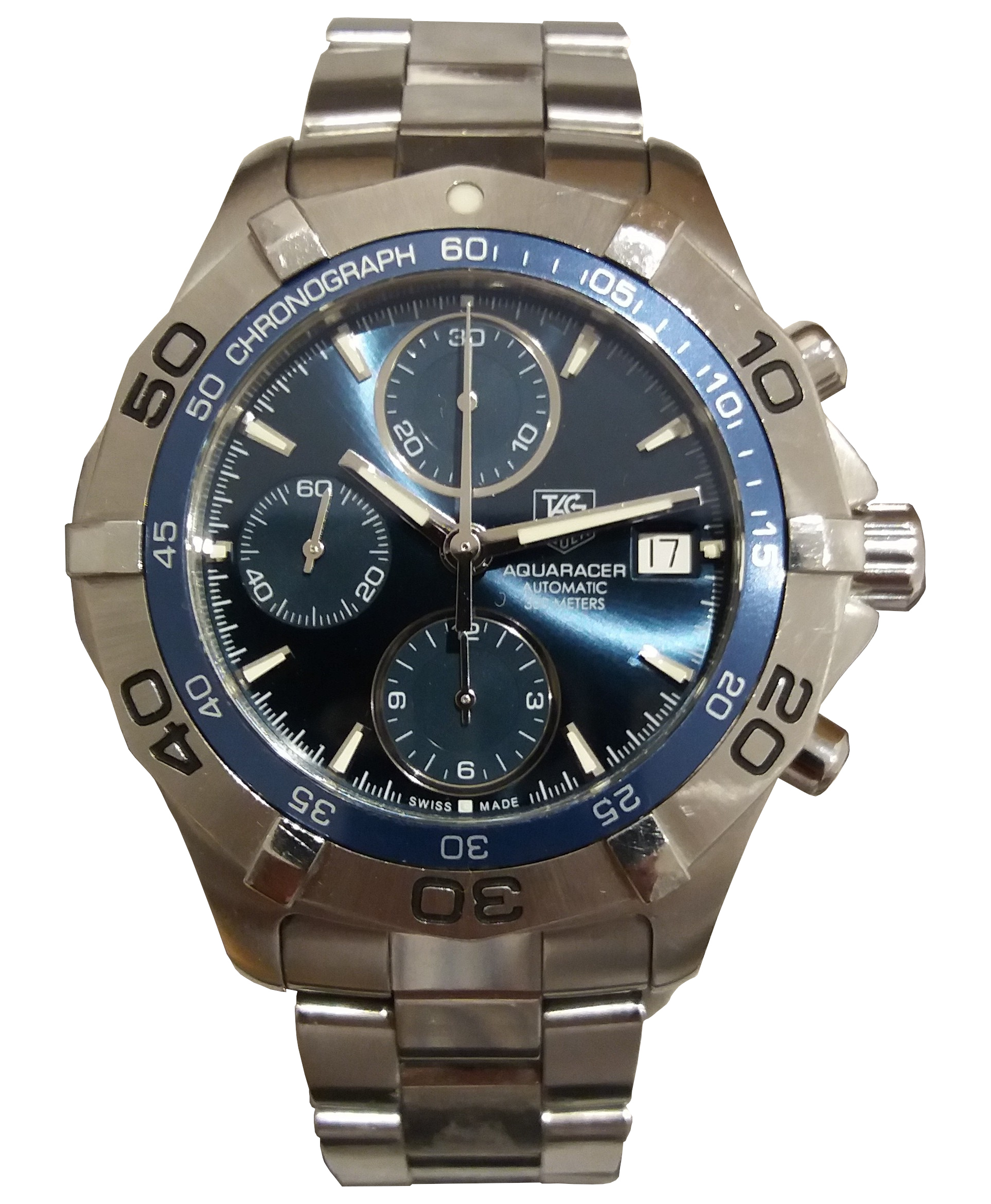
TAG Heuer AQUARACER AUTOMATIC 300 METERS Chronograph, Equipped with Valjoux-7750 movement

Heuer's first automatic chronographs were the Autavia, Carrera, and Monaco. These were powered by the Cal 11 and Cal 12 movements (12-hour chronograph); Cal 14 movement (12-hour chronograph and additional hand for GMT/second time-zone) and the Cal 15 movement (30-minute chronograph). The winding crown was on the left, with the pushers for the chronograph on the right. The earliest of Heuer's Cal 11 chronographs (from 1969) were named "Chrono-Matic". In the early-1970s, Heuer expanded its line of automatic chronographs to include the Daytona, Montreal, Silverstone, Calculator, Monza, and Jarama models, all powered by the Calibre 11 movement.

=== 1970s ===
In 1975, Heuer introduced the Chronosplit, a digital chronograph with dual LED and LCD displays. Later versions featured two LCD displays.

Heuer began using the Valjoux 7750 movement in its automatic chronographs, with the Kentucky and Pasadena models (both introduced in 1977). The Valjoux 7750 movement was a three-register chronograph (with seconds, minutes, and hours), that also offered day/date windows.

In the mid-1970s, Heuer introduced a series of chronographs powered by the Lemania 5100 movement. The Lemania 5100 movements have the minute hand for the chronograph on the center pinion (rather than on a smaller register), greatly improving legibility. The Lemania 5100 movement is considered very rugged and has been used in a variety of chronographs issued to military pilots. There are ten models of Heuer chronographs powered by the Lemania 5100—Reference 510.500 (stainless steel), 510.501 (black coated), 510.502 (olive drab coated), 510.503 (pewter-coated), 510.511 (Carrera dialed acrylic crystal PVD finish), 510.523 (Carrera dialed acrylic crystal stainless steel), as well as models with the names Silverstone (steel case with black dial) and Cortina (steel case with blue dial); the Reference 510.543 was made for the A.M.I. (Italian Air Force) and a special edition (with no reference number marked on the case) was made for AudiSport.

=== 1980–present ===
TAG Heuer was formed in 1985 when TAG Group (Holdings) S.A., manufacturers of high-tech items such as ceramic turbochargers for Formula One cars, acquired Heuer. Akram Ojjeh, the owner of TAG Heuer sold a significant stake of the company to British businessman Ron Dennis.

In 1999 TAG Heuer accepted a bid from LVMH Moët Hennessy Louis Vuitton S.A. of CHF 1.15 billion (£452.15 million, USD 739 million), contingent upon a transfer of 50.1 percent of stock.

In 2010, TAG Heuer introduced the "Pendulum Concept", the first magnetic oscillator without hairspring capable of providing restoring torque comparable to that of hairspring.

In 2013, TAG Heuer celebrated the 50th anniversary of the Carrera, the racing-inspired chronograph that is a key part of the TAG Heuer range today. There have been ten generations of Carrera since its introduction, with models launched in every decade since 1963.

In 2017 TAG Heuer released limited edition Muhammad Ali watch.

== Motto and slogan ==
A company slogan of TAG Heuer is "Don't Crack Under Pressure". The slogan was originally introduced in 1991.

== Watch manufacturing ==
=== Watches ===
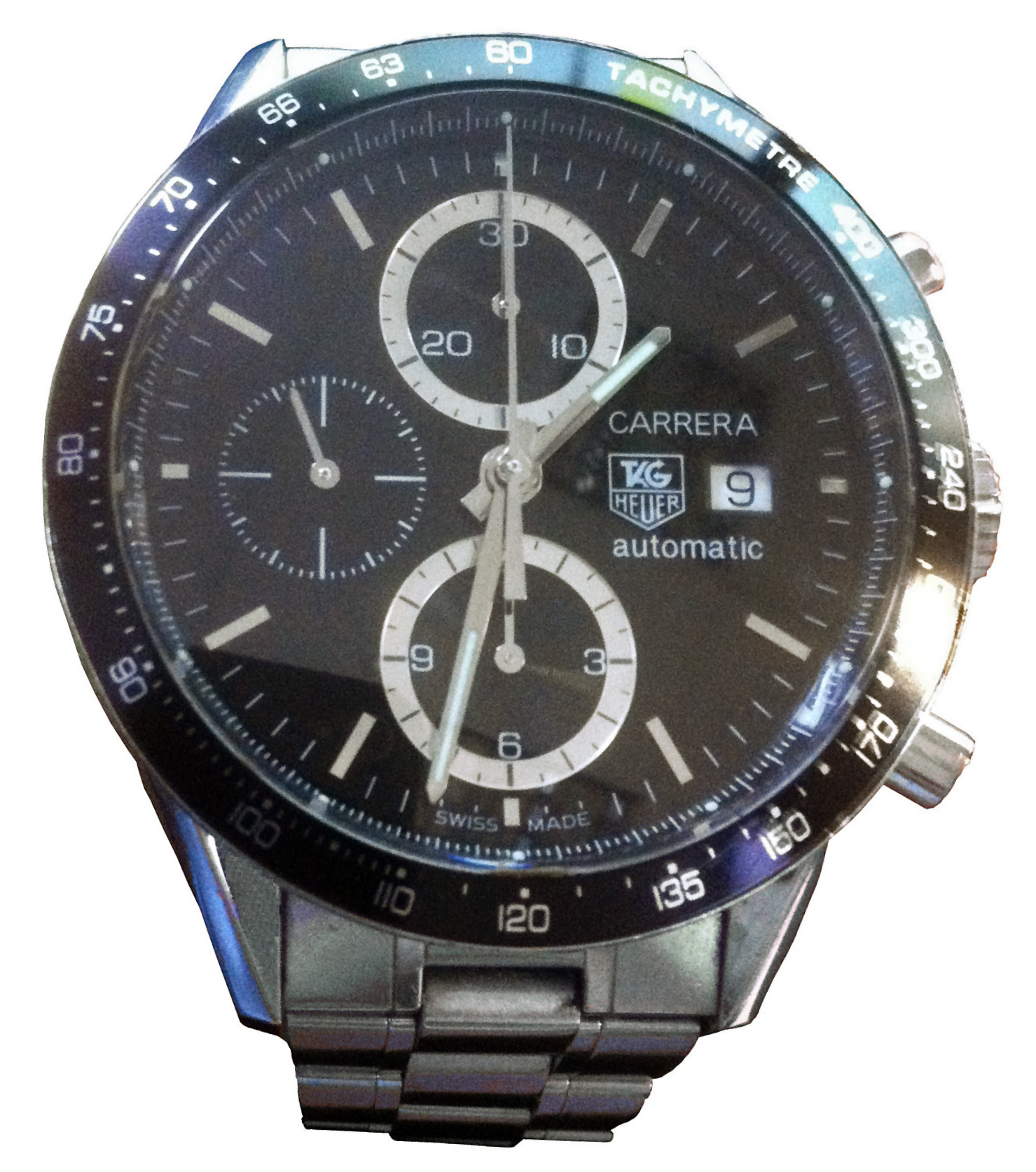
2008 Tag Heuer CV2010 Carrera

TAG Heuer's current lines include Formula One, Aquaracer, Link, Carrera, Monaco, Connected, Autavia, and Heuer Heritage.

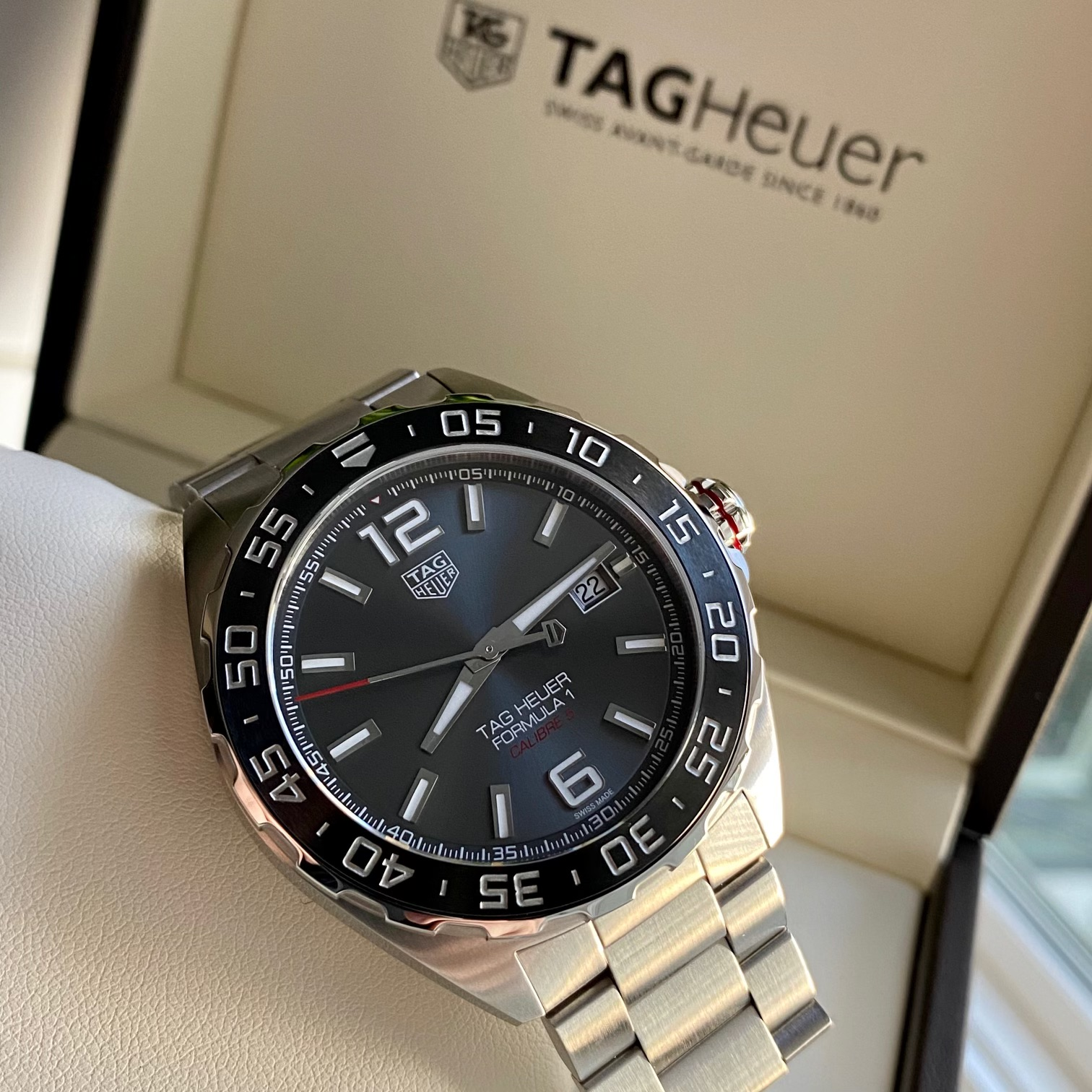
2020 Tag Heuer Formula 1 Calibre 5

Some of the more recently announced models include the Monaco V4 (the movement of which is driven by belts rather than gears); the Carrera Calibre 360 (the first mechanical wrist chronograph to measure and display time to 1/100 of a second) and the Monaco 69 (with both a digital chronograph accurate to a millisecond and a traditional mechanical movement, with a hinged mechanism allowing wearers to flip the watch between its two separate dials).

London-based Christoph Behling has been the lead designer for TAG Heuer since 2004. The collaboration has resulted in some of the brand's most celebrated pieces including the world's fastest chronograph, the Mikrogirder 1/2000, launched in 2012.

Many TAG Heuer watches feature chronographs. In January 2011 TAG Heuer announced the new Carrera Mikrograph, the first TAG Heuer to use the in-house Mikrograph movement, which is accurate to 1/100 of a second. Additionally, TAG Heuer has also released the limited edition Carrera MP4-12C to commemorate the launch of the McLaren MP4-12C supercar. TAG Heuer has been a partner of the McLaren F1 team for over 26 years.

At the Basel 2011 show in March 2011, TAG Heuer announced the Mikrotimer Flying 1000, a concept mechanical watch capable of accuracy of 1/1000 of a second—ten times more accurate than the Mikrograph.

This mark was superseded in January 2012 with the Mikrogirder model, precise to 1/2,000 of a second.

==== TAG Heuer Connected ====
On November 9, 2015, TAG Heuer announced the launch of their first smartwatch which they named Tag Heuer Connected. The watch runs on the Android Wear operating system which is used by many smartwatch brands. It uses Intel chips.

TAG Heuer Connected also offers its own app which principally offers several custom TAG Heuer watch faces which include "Three-Hand", "Chronograph", "GMT", "Themed", "Ambassador" and "Exclusive" watch faces. Each watch face (other than Ambassador and Exclusive) offer black, blue and white backgrounds. The app also provides three smart functions which are a stopwatch, alarm and timer.

All other smartwatch functions and apps are driven via the Android Wear operating system.

In March 2017, TAG Heuer introduced a new smartwatch, TAG Heuer's Connected Modular 45, which allows its owners to switch between connected and mechanical modules.

In May 2017, TAG Heuer partnered with 20th Century Fox to make the TAG Heuer Connected the official watch of Kingsman: The Golden Circle.

In 2022, the Connected Calibre line of smartwatches was introduced.

=== Other products ===
Morez, France-based Groupe Logo manufactures TAG Heuer-branded eyewear under a licence acquired in 2002.

Paris, France-based ModeLabs Group manufactures TAG Heuer-branded mobile phone under licence. ModeLabs acquired the license in late-2007 and marketed the first TAG Heuer branded mobile phone in late 2008.

The company also markets a line of men's accessories including wallets, belts, bags, jackets, bracelets, and cuff-links.

=== Awards ===
In 2007, TAG Heuer won the iF product design award for its Monaco Calibre 360 LS Concept Chronograph. The award was given away by the International Forum Design Hannover GmbH, held in Hanover, Germany. The watch received the award in the Leisure/Lifestyle category. It was chosen among more than 2,200 timepieces presented by watchmakers from 35 countries. TAG Heuer received the iF product design award for the second time in two years. In 2006, another TAG Heuer watch, entitled Professional Golf Watch, won in the same Leisure/Lifestyle category. The design of the Professional Golf Watch was developed with Tiger Woods.

In 2010 the Carrera 1887 won La Petite Aiguille ("the small hand") award for watches retailing for less than CHF5,000 at the Grand Prix d'Horlogerie de Genève.

=== Environmental rating ===
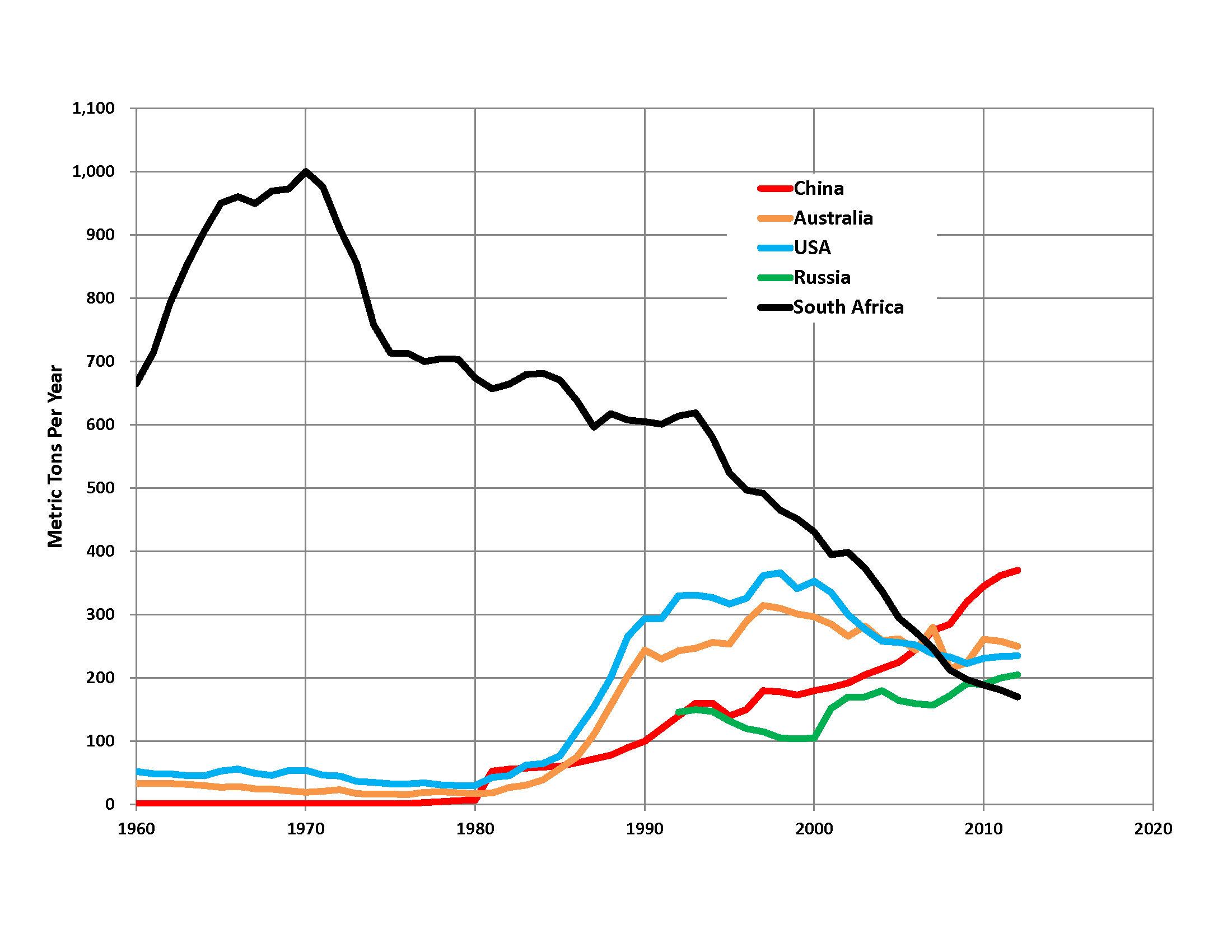
Top 5 gold producing nations

In December 2018, World Wide Fund for Nature (WWF) released an official report giving environmental ratings for 15 major watch manufacturers and jewelers in Switzerland. TAG Heuer, along with Chopard, was given a below-average environmental rating as "Lower Midfield", suggesting that the manufacturer has only taken a few actions addressing the impact of its manufacturing activities on the environment and climate change.

In the jewelry and watchmaking industries, there are general concerns over the lack of transparency in manufacturing activities and the sourcing of precious raw materials, such as gold, which is a major cause of environmental issues, such as pollution, soil degradation and deforestation. The situation is especially serious in the developing countries which are top producers of gold, including China, Russia and South Africa. It is estimated that the watch and jewelry sector uses over 50% of world's annual gold production (over 2,000 tons), but in most cases the watch companies are not able to or are unwilling to demonstrate where their raw materials come from and if the material suppliers use eco-friendly sourcing technologies.

== Notable patrons and owners ==
TAG Heuer, in keeping with its brand image, has long-standing links with the world of sport and Hollywood. The brand has had a long list of sports and Hollywood ambassadors. In addition, TAG Heuer has paid numerous celebrities to endorse its products, including: Tom Brady, Ayrton Senna, Kevin Richardson, Cristiano Ronaldo, Chris Hemsworth, Jessica Michibata, Tiger Woods, Leonardo DiCaprio, Brad Pitt, Sarah Fisher, Louis Koo, Chen Daoming, G.E.M. Tang, Jeff Gordon, Maria Sharapova, Jeremy Lin, Juan Pablo Montoya, Kimi Räikkönen, Uma Thurman, Fernando Alonso, Summer McIntosh, Lewis Hamilton, Max Verstappen, Sergio Pérez, Therese Johaug, Shah Rukh Khan, Priyanka Chopra, Cameron Diaz, Sydney McLaughlin, Steve McQueen, Ranbir Kapoor, Mary Kom, Alexander Rossi, Alexandra Daddario and Li Yifeng.

Steve McQueen wore a blue Monaco in the 1971 movie Le Mans (this model is now referred to as the "McQueen Monaco"), and Swiss Formula One star Jo Siffert customarily wore a white-dialed Autavia with black registers. In 1974, Heuer produced a special version of the black-dialed Autavia that was offered by the Viceroy cigarette company for US$88. This version of the Autavia was called the "Viceroy" and advertisements for this promotion featured racer Parnelli Jones.

== Sponsorship ==
In the past, TAG Heuer has been the official timekeeper of the three Summer Olympic Games of the 1920s, the Skiing World Championships and the Formula One World Championship. They have returned to the role of Formula One timekeeper from 2025 onwards, resuming the role they held prior to 2013.

TAG Heuer is the official time keeper and sponsor of La Liga, Bundesliga, Ligue 1, Serie A, J1 League, and Major League Soccer.

Since 2011, TAG Heuer has sponsored the Monaco Grand Prix, becoming a title sponsor of the event in 2025.

From 2017 to 2020, TAG Heuer was the official timekeeper for Gran Turismo Sport, a racing video game that was released on PlayStation 4.

=== Motorsport ===
TAG Heuer as a Formula One engine manufacturer
Formula One World Championship career
- First entry: 2016 Australian Grand Prix
- Last entry: 2018 Abu Dhabi Grand Prix
- Races entered: 62 (Note: All Grands Prix were with Renault-built engines.)
- Chassis: Red Bull
- Constructors' Championships: 0
- Drivers' Championships: 0
- Race victories: 9 (Note: All race victories achieved by Renault-built engines.)
- Podiums: 42 (Note: All podiums achieved by Renault-built engines.)
- Points: 1,255 (Note: All points scored by Renault-built engines.)
- Pole positions: 3 (Note: All pole positions achieved by Renault-built engines.)
- Fastest laps: 13 (Note: All fastest laps achieved by Renault-built engines.)

TAG Heuer is an official partner of the Red Bull Racing in Formula One, and sponsored Red Bull's Renault-manufactured power units from 2016 to 2018. TAG, now known as TAG Group which is no longer affiliated with TAG Heuer, sponsored Williams during the early 1980s. TAG also gave its name to the Porsche engines used by McLaren from 1983 through 1987, and remained a sponsor until 2015. TAG Group continued to hold a stake in McLaren until 2024. Heuer was the official timepiece of the Scuderia Ferrari in the 1970s, prior to the TAG acquisition.

The endorsement with Red Bull was part of a larger promotional outreach program by former TAG Heuer CEO Jean-Claude Biver to enter into markets that may not necessarily be traditional markets for the company, an idea Biver calls "Universes", which include sport, heritage, lifestyle and art and music. Other brand ambassadors in the "Universes" program include David Guetta, OneRepublic, Martin Garrix, Cara Delevingne, Chris Hemsworth, Manchester United F.C. and Muhammad Ali.

Starting in May 2018, TAG Heuer picked up the sponsorship of the pagoda at the Indianapolis Motor Speedway and also sponsors the IndyCar Series.

In September 2023, TAG Heuer is became the title sponsor of Porsche Formula E Team.

In February 2025, TAG Heuer became the official timekeeper of F1 Academy. TAG Heuer will also support Aiva Anagnostiadis for the 2025 season.

Complete Formula One results

(key) (results in bold indicate pole position; races in italics indicate fastest lap)

Year	Entrant	Chassis	Engine	Tyres	Drivers	1	2	3	4	5	6	7	8	9	10	11	12	13	14	15	16	17	18	19	20	21	Points	WCC
2016	Red Bull Racing	Red Bull RB12	TAG Heuer F1-2016 1.6 V6 t	P		AUS	BHR	CHN	RUS	ESP	MON	CAN	EUR	AUT	GBR	HUN	GER	BEL	ITA	SIN	MAL	JPN	USA	MEX	BRA	ABU	**468**	**2nd**
2016	Red Bull Racing	Red Bull RB12	TAG Heuer F1-2016 1.6 V6 t	P	(Australia) Daniel Ricciardo	4	4	4	11	4	**2**	7	7	5	4	3	2	2	5	2	1	6	3	3	8	5	**468**	**2nd**
2016	Red Bull Racing	Red Bull RB12	TAG Heuer F1-2016 1.6 V6 t	P	(Russia) Daniil Kvyat	DNS	7	3	15																		**468**	**2nd**
2016	Red Bull Racing	Red Bull RB12	TAG Heuer F1-2016 1.6 V6 t	P	(Netherlands) Max Verstappen					1	Ret	4	8	2	2	5	3	11	7	6	2	2	Ret	4	3	4	**468**	**2nd**
2017	Red Bull Racing	Red Bull RB13	TAG Heuer F1-2017 1.6 V6 t	P		AUS	CHN	BHR	RUS	ESP	MON	CAN	AZE	AUT	GBR	HUN	BEL	ITA	SIN	MAL	JPN	USA	MEX	BRA	ABU		368	3rd
2017	Red Bull Racing	Red Bull RB13	TAG Heuer F1-2017 1.6 V6 t	P	(Australia) Daniel Ricciardo	Ret	4	5	Ret	3	3	3	1	3	5	Ret	3	4	2	3	3	Ret	Ret	6	Ret		368	3rd
2017	Red Bull Racing	Red Bull RB13	TAG Heuer F1-2017 1.6 V6 t	P	(Netherlands) Max Verstappen	5	3	Ret	5	Ret	5	Ret	Ret	Ret	4	5	Ret	10	Ret	1	2	4	1	5	5		368	3rd
2018	Aston Martin Red Bull Racing	Red Bull Racing RB14	TAG Heuer F1-2018 1.6 V6 t	P		AUS	BHR	CHN	AZE	ESP	MON	CAN	FRA	AUT	GBR	GER	HUN	BEL	ITA	SIN	RUS	JPN	USA	MEX	BRA	ABU	419	3rd
2018	Aston Martin Red Bull Racing	Red Bull Racing RB14	TAG Heuer F1-2018 1.6 V6 t	P	(Australia) Daniel Ricciardo	4	Ret	1	Ret	5	**1**	4	4	Ret	5	Ret	4	Ret	Ret	6	6	4	Ret	**Ret**	4	4	419	3rd
2018	Aston Martin Red Bull Racing	Red Bull Racing RB14	TAG Heuer F1-2018 1.6 V6 t	P	(Netherlands) Max Verstappen	6	Ret	5	Ret	3	9	3	2	1	15^{†}	4	Ret	3	5	2	5	3	2	1	2	3	419	3rd

Notes

^{†} The driver did not finish the Grand Prix, but was classified as he completed over 90% of the race distance.
