= 2017 Austrian Grand Prix =

9th race of the 2017 Formula One season

Race 9 of 20 in the 2017 Formula One World Championship
← Previous race	Next race →
- Layout of the Red Bull Ring

Race details
- Date: 9 July 2017
- Official name: Formula 1 FlyEmirates Grosser Preis von Österreich 2017
- Location: Red Bull Ring; Spielberg, Styria, Austria
- Course: Permanent racing facility
- Course length: 4.318 km (2.683 miles)
- Distance: 71 laps, 306.452 km (190.420 miles)
- Weather: Partly cloudy
- Attendance: 145,000

Pole position
Driver	(Finland) Valtteri Bottas	Mercedes
- Time: 1:04.251

Fastest lap
Driver	(United Kingdom) Lewis Hamilton	Mercedes
- Time: 1:07.411 on lap 69

Podium
First	(Finland) Valtteri Bottas	Mercedes
Second	(Germany) Sebastian Vettel	Ferrari
Third	(Australia) Daniel Ricciardo	Red Bull Racing-TAG Heuer

The 2017 Austrian Grand Prix (formally known as the Formula 1 Grosser Preis von Österreich 2017) was a Formula One motor race that took place on 9 July 2017 at the Red Bull Ring in Spielberg, Austria. The race, which was contested over seventy-one laps, was the ninth round of the 2017 FIA Formula One World Championship, and marked the 31st running of the Austrian Grand Prix and the 30th time it had been held as a round of the Formula One World Championship since the series inception in 1950, every time at Spielberg using the current or former variations of this circuit.

Ferrari driver Sebastian Vettel entered the round as the championship leader, with a 14-point advantage over Lewis Hamilton, and extended it to 20 points. Mercedes led Ferrari by 24 points in the Constructors' standings at the start of the round, and extended it to 33 points.

== Qualifying ==
Pos.	Car no.	Driver	Constructor	Qualifying times			Final grid
Pos.	Car no.	Driver	Constructor	Q1	Q2	Q3	Final grid
1	77	(Finland) Valtteri Bottas	Mercedes	1:05.760	1:04.316	1:04.251	1
2	5	(Germany) Sebastian Vettel	Ferrari	1:05.585	1:04.772	1:04.293	2
3	44	(United Kingdom) Lewis Hamilton	Mercedes	1:05.064	1:04.800	1:04.424	8^{1}
4	7	(Finland) Kimi Räikkönen	Ferrari	1:05.148	1:05.004	1:04.779	3
5	3	(Australia) Daniel Ricciardo	Red Bull Racing-TAG Heuer	1:05.854	1:05.161	1:04.896	4
6	33	(Netherlands) Max Verstappen	Red Bull Racing-TAG Heuer	1:05.779	1:04.948	1:04.983	5
7	8	(France) Romain Grosjean	Haas-Ferrari	1:05.902	1:05.319	1:05.480	6
8	11	(Mexico) Sergio Pérez	Force India-Mercedes	1:05.975	1:05.435	1:05.605	7
9	31	(France) Esteban Ocon	Force India-Mercedes	1:06.033	1:05.550	1:05.674	9
10	55	(Spain) Carlos Sainz Jr.	Toro Rosso	1:05.675	1:05.544	1:05.726	10
11	27	(Germany) Nico Hülkenberg	Renault	1:06.174	1:05.597		11
12	14	(Spain) Fernando Alonso	McLaren-Honda	1:06.158	1:05.602		12
13	2	(Belgium) Stoffel Vandoorne	McLaren-Honda	1:06.316	1:05.741		13
14	26	(Russia) Daniil Kvyat	Toro Rosso	1:05.990	1:05.884		14
15	20	(Denmark) Kevin Magnussen	Haas-Ferrari	1:06.143	No time		15
16	30	(United Kingdom) Jolyon Palmer	Renault	1:06.345			16
17	19	(Brazil) Felipe Massa	Williams-Mercedes	1:06.534			17
18	18	(Canada) Lance Stroll	Williams-Mercedes	1:06.608			18
19	9	(Sweden) Marcus Ericsson	Sauber-Ferrari	1:06.857			19
20	94	(Germany) Pascal Wehrlein	Sauber-Ferrari	1:07.011			PL^{2}
107% time: 1:09.618

Notes

- ^1 – Lewis Hamilton received a five-place grid penalty for an unscheduled gearbox change.
- ^2 – Pascal Wehrlein was required to start from pit lane, as his car was modified while under Parc Fermé conditions.

== Race ==
At the start Valtteri Bottas made a perfect get away to lead Sebastian Vettel into the first corner, behind them there was problems with Daniil Kvyat hitting Fernando Alonso who then in turn hit Max Verstappen, both Alonso and Verstappen retired, Kvyat was given a drive through penalty for causing the accident. Bottas came under investigation for a jump start but the stewards issued no penalty. The rest of the race had little action until towards the end Vettel applied pressure on Bottas for the lead but ultimately he failed to get past Bottas who won the race. Daniel Ricciardo meanwhile held off Lewis Hamilton for the final podium spot allowing Vettel to extend his championship lead to 20 points.

=== Race classification ===
Pos.	No.	Driver	Constructor	Laps	Time/Retired	Grid	Points
1	77	(Finland) Valtteri Bottas	Mercedes	71	1:21:48.523	1	25
2	5	(Germany) Sebastian Vettel	Ferrari	71	+0.658	2	18
3	3	(Australia) Daniel Ricciardo	Red Bull Racing-TAG Heuer	71	+6.012	4	15
4	44	(United Kingdom) Lewis Hamilton	Mercedes	71	+7.430	8	12
5	7	(Finland) Kimi Räikkönen	Ferrari	71	+20.370	3	10
6	8	(France) Romain Grosjean	Haas-Ferrari	71	+1:13.160	6	8
7	11	(Mexico) Sergio Pérez	Force India-Mercedes	70	+1 Lap	7	6
8	31	(France) Esteban Ocon	Force India-Mercedes	70	+1 Lap	9	4
9	19	(Brazil) Felipe Massa	Williams-Mercedes	70	+1 Lap	17	2
10	18	(Canada) Lance Stroll	Williams-Mercedes	70	+1 Lap	18	1
11	30	(United Kingdom) Jolyon Palmer	Renault	70	+1 Lap	16	
12	2	(Belgium) Stoffel Vandoorne	McLaren-Honda	70	+1 Lap	13	
13	27	(Germany) Nico Hülkenberg	Renault	70	+1 Lap	11	
14	94	(Germany) Pascal Wehrlein	Sauber-Ferrari	70	+1 Lap	PL	
15	9	(Sweden) Marcus Ericsson	Sauber-Ferrari	69	+2 Laps	19	
16	26	(Russia) Daniil Kvyat	Toro Rosso	68	+3 Laps	14	
Ret	55	(Spain) Carlos Sainz Jr.	Toro Rosso	44	Engine	10	
Ret	20	(Denmark) Kevin Magnussen	Haas-Ferrari	29	Hydraulics	15	
Ret	14	(Spain) Fernando Alonso	McLaren-Honda	1	Collision damage	12	
Ret	33	(Netherlands) Max Verstappen	Red Bull Racing-TAG Heuer	0	Collision damage	5	

== Championship standings after the race ==
Drivers' Championship standings

Pos.	Driver	Points
1	(Germany) Sebastian Vettel	171
2	(United Kingdom) Lewis Hamilton	151
3	(Finland) Valtteri Bottas	136
4	(Australia) Daniel Ricciardo	107
5	(Finland) Kimi Räikkönen	83

Constructors' Championship standings

Pos.	Constructor	Points
1	(Germany) Mercedes	287
2	(Italy) Ferrari	254
3	(Austria) Red Bull Racing-TAG Heuer	152
4	Force India-Mercedes	89
5	(United Kingdom) Williams-Mercedes	40

- Note: Only the top five positions are included for both sets of standings.

== See also ==
- 2017 Spielberg Formula 2 round
- 2017 Spielberg GP3 Series round

Previous race: 2017 Azerbaijan Grand Prix	FIA Formula One World Championship; 2017 season	Next race: 2017 British Grand Prix
Previous race: 2016 Austrian Grand Prix	Austrian Grand Prix	Next race: 2018 Austrian Grand Prix
