= 2018 Canadian Grand Prix =

Race 7 of 21 in the 2018 Formula One World Championship
← Previous race	Next race →
- Layout of the Circuit Gilles Villeneuve

Race details
- Date: 10 June 2018
- Official name: Formula 1 Grand Prix Heineken du Canada 2018
- Location: Circuit Gilles Villeneuve; Montreal, Quebec, Canada
- Course: Street circuit
- Course length: 4.361 km (2.710 miles)
- Distance: 68 laps, 296.548 km (184.266 miles)
- Scheduled distance: 70 laps, 305.270 km (189.686 miles)
- Weather: Temperatures reaching up to 22.7 °C (72.9 °F); with wind speeds reaching 11.1 kilometres per hour (6.9 mph)

Pole position
Driver	(Germany) Sebastian Vettel	Ferrari
- Time: 1:10.764

Fastest lap
Driver	(Netherlands) Max Verstappen	Red Bull Racing-TAG Heuer
- Time: 1:13.864 on lap 65

Podium
First	(Germany) Sebastian Vettel	Ferrari
Second	(Finland) Valtteri Bottas	Mercedes
Third	(Netherlands) Max Verstappen	Red Bull Racing-TAG Heuer

The 2018 Canadian Grand Prix (formally known as the Formula 1 Grand Prix Heineken du Canada 2018) is a Formula One motor race that took place on 10 June 2018 at the Circuit Gilles Villeneuve in Montreal, Quebec, Canada. The race was the 7th round of the 2018 FIA Formula One World Championship. The race was won by Sebastian Vettel of Ferrari. It was Vettel's 50th career win, becoming the fourth driver in Formula One history to achieve such a feat (joining Michael Schumacher, Lewis Hamilton and Alain Prost). It was the 55th running of the Canadian Grand Prix, the 49th time the event had been included as a round of the Formula One World Championship since the inception of the series in 1950, and the 39th time that a World Championship was held at Circuit Gilles Villeneuve. Fernando Alonso also celebrated his 300th Grand Prix entry at this race. This race was Ferrari's first win in Canada since Michael Schumacher won here in 2004.

Mercedes driver Lewis Hamilton went in to the race as the defending race winner. He entered the round with a 14-point lead over Sebastian Vettel in the World Drivers' Championship. In the World Constructors' Championship, Mercedes held a 17-point lead over Ferrari.

== Report ==
=== Background ===
==== Tyres ====
The tyre compounds provided for this race were the hypersoft, ultrasoft and supersoft.

=== Practice ===
Max Verstappen was fastest across all three practice sessions, improving his time in each successive session. In FP2, Grosjean hit a groundhog that was on the track, damaging his front wing, and reducing the Haas team's spare parts.

=== Qualifying ===
Romain Grosjean's car had a major engine failure as it left the pitlane in Q1 meaning he failed to set a lap time, and raced at the stewards' discretion. In Q2, when Sebastian Vettel was completing his final flying lap, he aborted the lap because Carlos Sainz, Nico Hülkenberg and a number of other cars were driving slowly along the back straight, leading him to pull into the pits. In Q3, Vettel took pole with a new track record however his teammate made a mistake in Turn 2, meaning he would qualify in P5.

=== Race ===
The grid got away largely without incident from the line, but in turn 5, Brendon Hartley and local driver Lance Stroll collided, forcing their immediate retirement and the deployment of the safety car. At the restart, Sergio Pérez touched Sainz, forcing Pérez off the track, losing positions. On lap 18, Daniel Ricciardo overcut Lewis Hamilton for the fourth position. On lap 43, Fernando Alonso retired from the race with an exhaust issue.

Race officials erroneously directed model Winnie Harlow to wave the chequered flag before race leader Vettel completed lap 69 (the scheduled penultimate lap) and therefore the results were taken from lap 68, according to the Formula 1 sporting regulations article 43.2. This meant that Ricciardo's successively faster laps on laps 69 and 70 were voided, and Sergio Pérez's overtake on Kevin Magnussen for 13th did not stand.

== Classification ==
=== Qualifying ===
Pos.	No.	Driver	Constructor	Qualifying times			Final grid
Pos.	No.	Driver	Constructor	Q1	Q2	Q3	Final grid
1	5	(Germany) Sebastian Vettel	Ferrari	1:11.710	1:11.524	1:10.764	1
2	77	(Finland) Valtteri Bottas	Mercedes	1:11.950	1:11.514	1:10.857	2
3	33	(Netherlands) Max Verstappen	Red Bull Racing-TAG Heuer	1:12.008	1:11.472	1:10.937	3
4	44	(United Kingdom) Lewis Hamilton	Mercedes	1:11.835	1:11.740	1:10.996	4
5	7	(Finland) Kimi Räikkönen	Ferrari	1:11.725	1:11.620	1:11.095	5
6	3	(Australia) Daniel Ricciardo	Red Bull Racing-TAG Heuer	1:12.459	1:11.434	1:11.116	6
7	27	(Germany) Nico Hülkenberg	Renault	1:12.795	1:11.916	1:11.973	7
8	31	(France) Esteban Ocon	Force India-Mercedes	1:12.577	1:12.141	1:12.084	8
9	55	(Spain) Carlos Sainz Jr.	Renault	1:12.689	1:12.097	1:12.168	9
10	11	(Mexico) Sergio Pérez	Force India-Mercedes	1:12.702	1:12.395	1:12.671	10
11	20	(Denmark) Kevin Magnussen	Haas-Ferrari	1:12.680	1:12.606		11
12	28	(New Zealand) Brendon Hartley	Scuderia Toro Rosso-Honda	1:12.587	1:12.635		12
13	16	(Monaco) Charles Leclerc	Sauber-Ferrari	1:12.945	1:12.661		13
14	14	(Spain) Fernando Alonso	McLaren-Renault	1:12.979	1:12.856		14
15	2	(Belgium) Stoffel Vandoorne	McLaren-Renault	1:12.998	1:12.865		15
16	10	(France) Pierre Gasly	Scuderia Toro Rosso-Honda	1:13.047			19^{1}
17	18	(Canada) Lance Stroll	Williams-Mercedes	1:13.590			16
18	35	(Russia) Sergey Sirotkin	Williams-Mercedes	1:13.643			17
19	9	(Sweden) Marcus Ericsson	Sauber-Ferrari	1:14.593			18
107% time: 1:16.729
—	8	(France) Romain Grosjean	Haas-Ferrari	No time			20^{2}

Notes

- ^1 – Pierre Gasly was sent to the back of the grid for his power unit change.
- ^2 – Romain Grosjean failed to set a lap time during qualifying. He was allowed to race at the stewards' discretion.

=== Race ===
Pos.	No.	Driver	Constructor	Laps^{1}	Time/Retired	Grid	Points
1	5	(Germany) Sebastian Vettel	Ferrari	68	1:28:31.377	1	25
2	77	(Finland) Valtteri Bottas	Mercedes	68	+7.376	2	18
3	33	(Netherlands) Max Verstappen	Red Bull Racing-TAG Heuer	68	+8.360	3	15
4	3	(Australia) Daniel Ricciardo	Red Bull Racing-TAG Heuer	68	+20.892	6	12
5	44	(United Kingdom) Lewis Hamilton	Mercedes	68	+21.559	4	10
6	7	(Finland) Kimi Räikkönen	Ferrari	68	+27.184	5	8
7	27	(Germany) Nico Hülkenberg	Renault	67	+1 lap	7	6
8	55	(Spain) Carlos Sainz Jr.	Renault	67	+1 lap	9	4
9	31	(France) Esteban Ocon	Force India-Mercedes	67	+1 lap	8	2
10	16	(Monaco) Charles Leclerc	Sauber-Ferrari	67	+1 lap	13	1
11	10	(France) Pierre Gasly	Scuderia Toro Rosso-Honda	67	+1 lap	19	
12	8	(France) Romain Grosjean	Haas-Ferrari	67	+1 lap	20	
13	20	(Denmark) Kevin Magnussen	Haas-Ferrari	67	+1 lap	11	
14	11	(Mexico) Sergio Pérez	Force India-Mercedes	67	+1 lap	10	
15	9	(Sweden) Marcus Ericsson	Sauber-Ferrari	66	+2 laps	18	
16	2	(Belgium) Stoffel Vandoorne	McLaren-Renault	66	+2 laps	15	
17	35	(Russia) Sergey Sirotkin	Williams-Mercedes	66	+2 laps	17	
Ret	14	(Spain) Fernando Alonso	McLaren-Renault	40	Exhaust	14	
Ret	28	(New Zealand) Brendon Hartley	Scuderia Toro Rosso-Honda	0	Collision	12	
Ret	18	(Canada) Lance Stroll	Williams-Mercedes	0	Collision	16	

Notes

- ^1 – The race was scheduled to run 70 laps, but the results were taken at the end of lap 68 after the chequered flag was incorrectly shown at the conclusion of lap 69.

== Championship standings after the race ==
Drivers' Championship standings

	Pos.	Driver	Points
1	1	(Germany) Sebastian Vettel	121
1	2	(United Kingdom) Lewis Hamilton	120
1	3	(Finland) Valtteri Bottas	86
1	4	(Australia) Daniel Ricciardo	84
	5	(Finland) Kimi Räikkönen	68

Constructors' Championship standings

Pos.	Constructor	Points
1	(Germany) Mercedes	206
2	(Italy) Ferrari	189
3	(Austria) Red Bull Racing-TAG Heuer	134
4	(France) Renault	56
5	(United Kingdom) McLaren-Renault	40

- Note: Only the top five positions are included for both sets of standings.

Previous race: 2018 Monaco Grand Prix	FIA Formula One World Championship; 2018 season	Next race: 2018 French Grand Prix
Previous race: 2017 Canadian Grand Prix	Canadian Grand Prix	Next race: 2019 Canadian Grand Prix
