= Red Bull RB12 =

2016 Formula One racing car

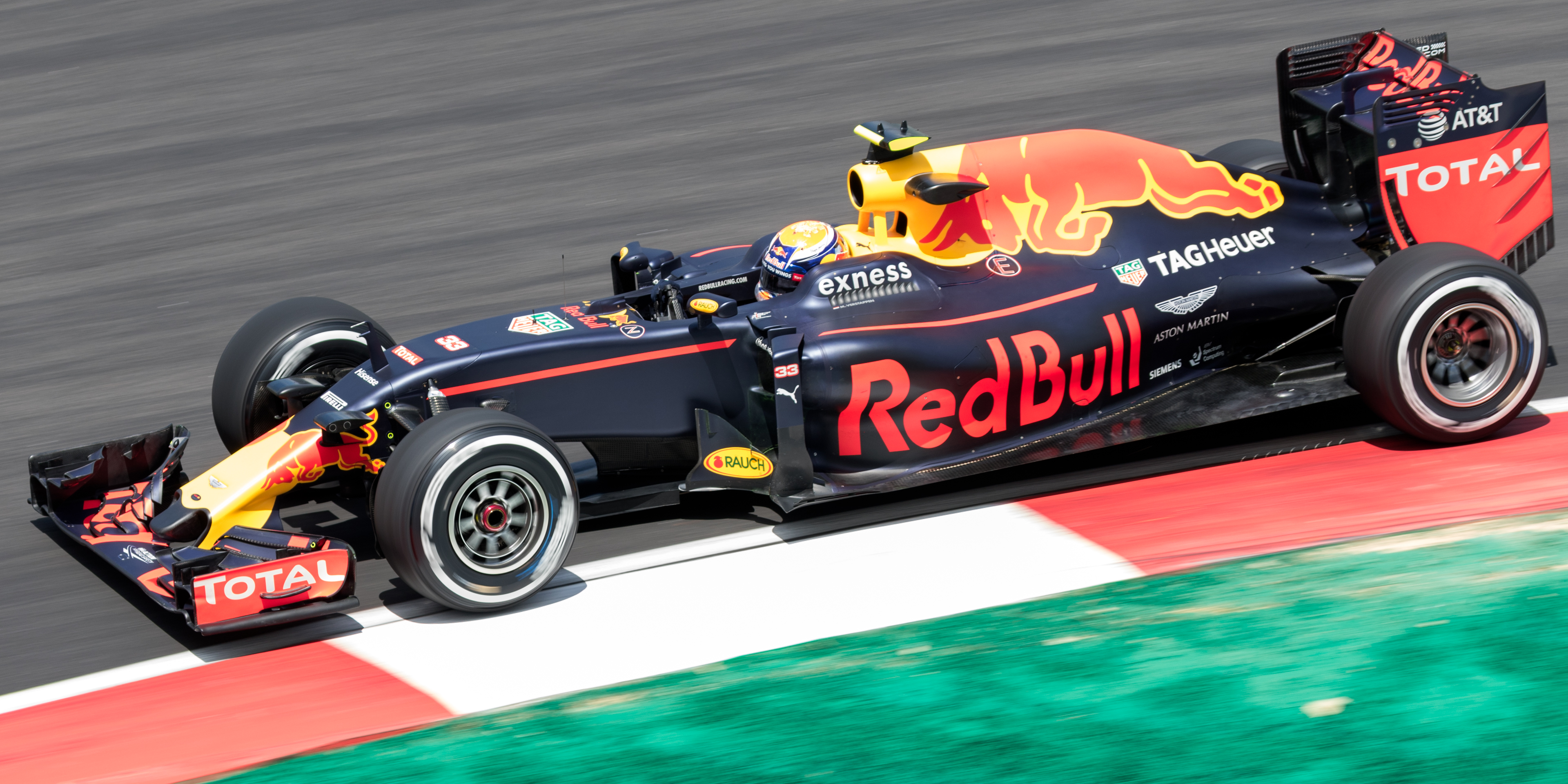
- The Red Bull RB12, driven by Max Verstappen, during the Malaysian Grand Prix
- Category: Formula One
- Constructor: Red Bull
- Designers: Adrian Newey (Chief Technical Officer); Rob Marshall (Chief Engineering Officer); Rob Gray (Chief Designer); Steve Winstanley (Deputy Chief Designer, Composites and Structures); David Worner (Deputy Chief Designer, Mechanics and Suspension); Pierre Waché (Chief Engineer, Performance); Dan Fallows (Head of Aerodynamics); Craig Skinner (Deputy Head of Aerodynamics); Stefano Sordo (Head of Aerodynamic Performance)
- Predecessor: Red Bull RB11
- Successor: Red Bull RB13

Technical specifications
- Chassis: Composite monocoque structure, designed and built in-house, carrying the TAG Heuer Power Unit as fully stressed member.
- Suspension (front): Aluminium alloy uprights, carbon fibre composite double wishbones with pushrods, springs, anti-roll bar and dampers
- Suspension (rear): Same as front
- Engine: Mecachrome-built and assembled Renault R.E.16 (rebadged as TAG Heuer F1-2016) 1.6 L (98 cu in) direct injection V6 turbocharged engine, limited to 15,000 rpm in a mid-mounted, rear-wheel drive layout
- Electric motor: Kinetic and thermal energy recovery systems
- Transmission: Sequential shift gearbox with eight forward and one reverse gears
- Battery: Lithium-ion batteries
- Power: 900 hp
- Fuel: Total Excellium
- Lubricants: Total Quartz 9000
- Brakes: Brembo calipers Friction material; carbon/carbon composite discs and pads
- Tyres: Pirelli P Zero (dry) tyres Pirelli Cinturato (wet) tyres O.Z. Racing, Front: 12.0in x 13in diam., Rear: 13.7in x 13in diam.

Competition history
- Notable entrants: Red Bull Racing
- Notable drivers: 3. (Australia) Daniel Ricciardo; 26. (Russia) Daniil Kvyat; 33. (Netherlands) Max Verstappen
- Debut: 2016 Australian Grand Prix
- First win: 2016 Spanish Grand Prix
- Last win: 2016 Malaysian Grand Prix
- Last event: 2016 Abu Dhabi Grand Prix
Races	Wins	Podiums	Poles	F/Laps
21	2	16	1	5

The Red Bull RB12 is a Formula One racing car designed by Red Bull Racing to compete in the 2016 Formula One season. The car was driven by Daniel Ricciardo, Daniil Kvyat and Max Verstappen, the lattermost of whom swapped with Kvyat mid-season, moving from Scuderia Toro Rosso to Red Bull while Kvyat moved to Toro Rosso ahead of the Spanish Grand Prix.

== Design ==
The car used a customer Renault engine re-badged as a TAG Heuer following the breakdown in the relationship between Red Bull and Renault in 2015 as Renault re-formed their works constructor after Lotus buyout. This was the last Red Bull car with fuel and lubricants from Total ending their eight-year partnership.

== Competition history ==
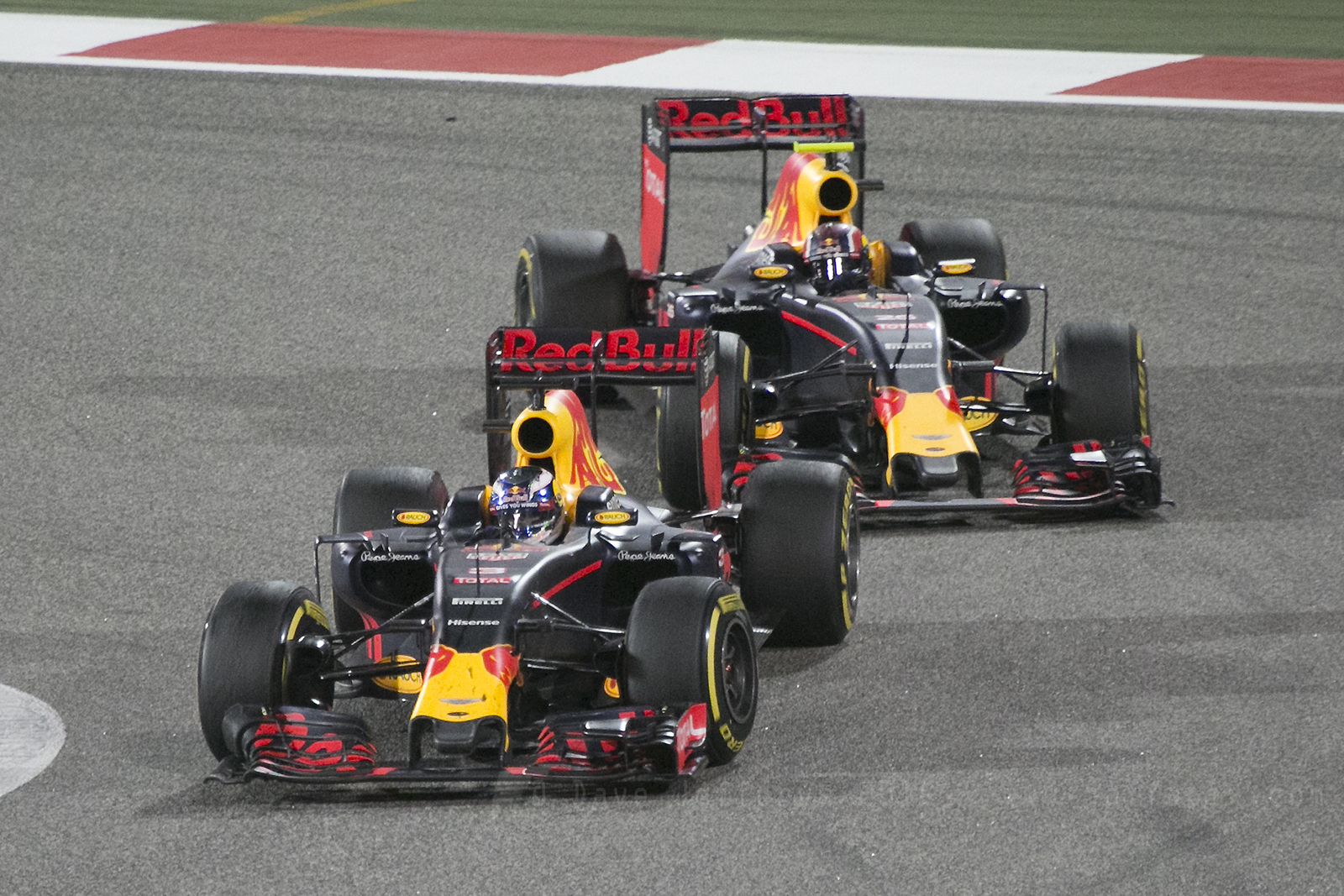
Daniel Ricciardo (front) and Daniil Kvyat at the Bahrain Grand Prix

In the season-opening Australian Grand Prix, both Kvyat and Ricciardo performed well in all three practice sessions. In qualifying, Kvyat qualified a disappointing 18th following mechanical problems with his car, and Ricciardo went on to qualify 8th. In the race, Kvyat failed to start the race due to an electrical problem, meanwhile Ricciardo set the fastest lap and went on to finish the race in fourth.

In the Bahrain Grand Prix, under the short lived knock out style qualification format, Kvyat was the first to be knocked out of Q2, thus starting in 15th. Ricciardo made it to Q3 and qualified in 5th, almost one and a half seconds behind pole sitter Lewis Hamilton. During the race, Kvyat had contact with Nico Hülkenberg on the first lap but was able to finish 7th, one lap behind winner Nico Rosberg. Ricciardo finished 4th, over a minute behind Rosberg.

In the Chinese Grand Prix, after a return to the normal qualifying format, Ricciardo and Kvyat qualified 2nd and 6th respectively. During the race, Ricciardo charged off the line to take the lead of the race from Rosberg. Kvyat charged up the inside of Sebastian Vettel in turn one, causing him to collide with Ferrari teammate Kimi Räikkönen. Ricciardo kept the lead until his left-rear tyre failed during lap 3 on the long straight between turns 13 and 14. Kvyat climbed his way to a 3rd-place finish, while Ricciardo had a great recovery drive to secure 4th.

While in Q2 of the Russian Grand Prix, Ricciardo's wing mirror came free of its mount, and appeared to be held on by wiring alone. The mirror bounced into and out of the cockpit, causing quite a bit of distraction. Regardless of the distraction, Ricciardo moved onto Q3 and qualified 6th, but was elevated to 5th due to a five-place grid penalty assessed to Vettel for a change of his gearbox. Kvyat, after barely making it into Q3, was able to qualify 8th. At the start of the race, Kvyat struck the rear of Vettel's Ferrari SF16-H braking for turn one, sending him into Ricciardo, causing all three cars damage. Then, during the long left handed turn three, Kvyat struck Vettel again from behind, sending Vettel into the outside wall at great speed. Kvyat was assessed a ten-second stop-and-go penalty for the contact with Vettel. Both Kvyat and Ricciardo's races were ruined by the first lap incidents. Ricciardo was able to finish 11th, while Kvyat only managed to finish 15th.

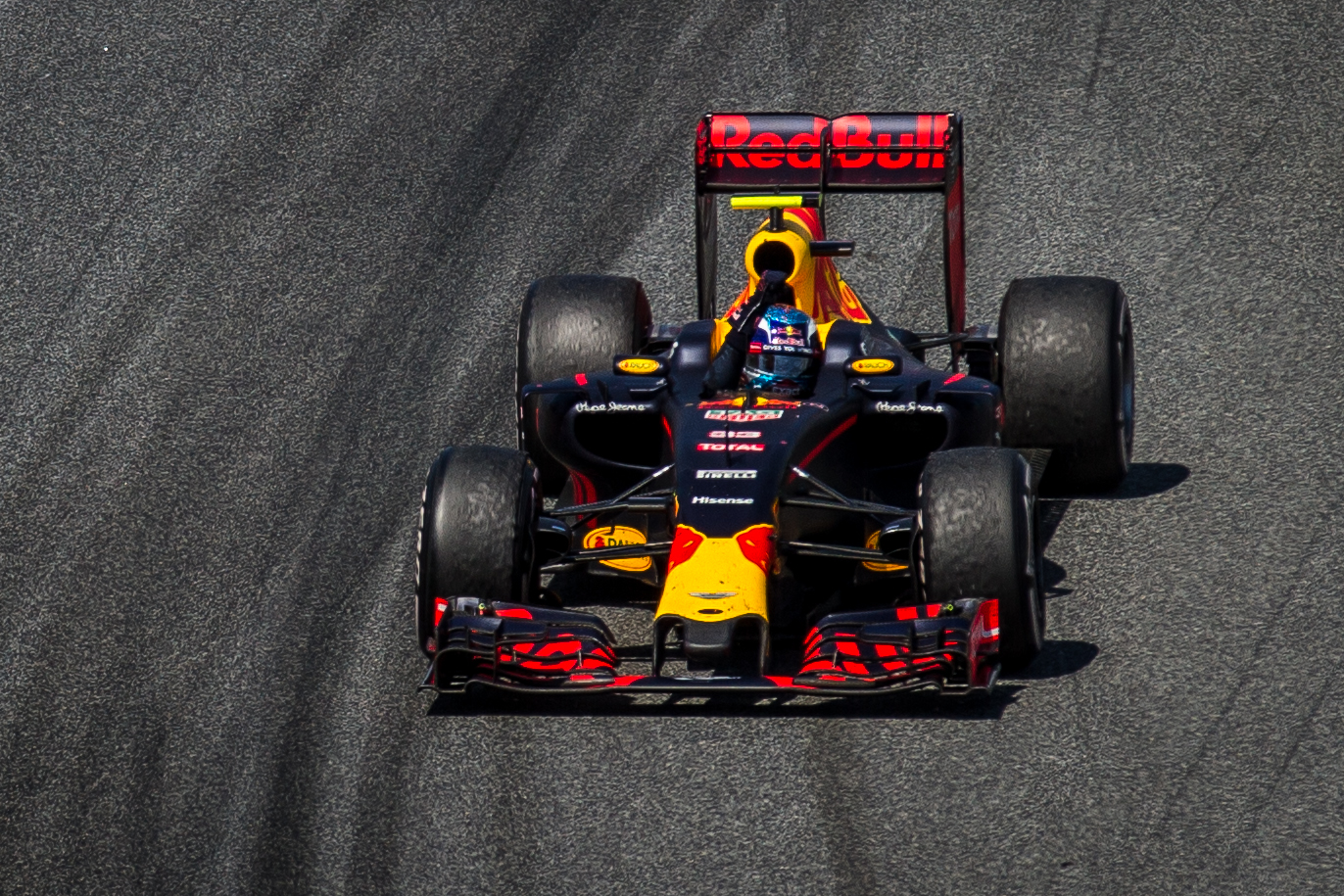
Max Verstappen won on his debut with the team at the Spanish Grand Prix.

In the week leading up to the Spanish Grand Prix, Kvyat was relegated back to Scuderia Toro Rosso for the rest of the season, while Verstappen was promoted in his place to Red Bull Racing. Verstappen qualified 4th, half of a second slower than Ricciardo, who qualified 3rd. On the first lap of the race, exiting the long right handed turn three, Hamilton and Rosberg collided, causing both to exit the race with damage. A safety car was deployed, with Ricciardo leading the race with Verstappen right behind him. Ricciardo went with a safer three-stop strategy, while Verstappen went onto the riskier two stop strategy. At the end of the different strategies, Ricciardo finished 4th, while Verstappen was able to stay out ahead of the two Ferrari drivers, making him the youngest ever race winner and first Dutch race winner in Formula One.

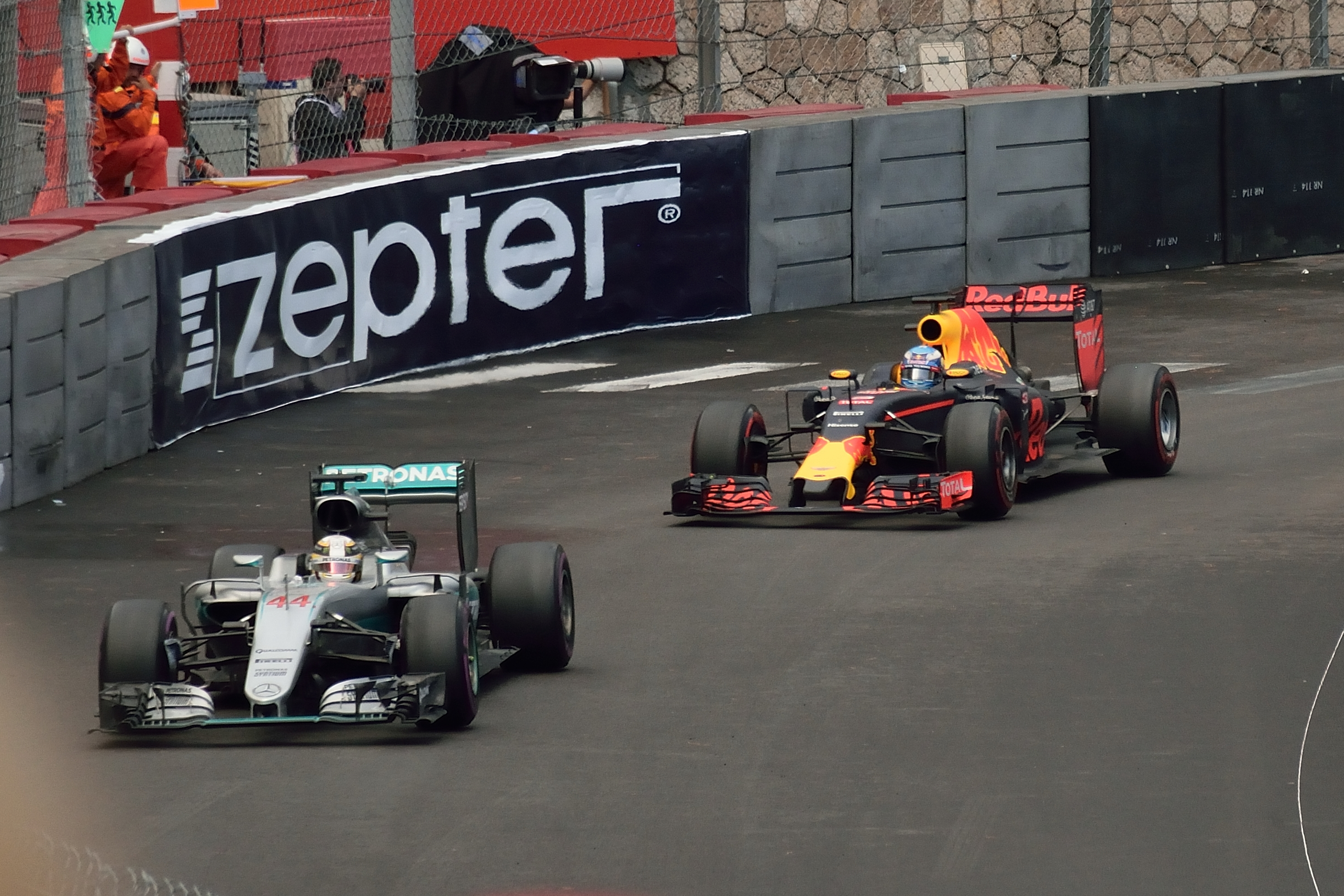
Despite earning his first career pole during the Monaco Grand Prix, Ricciardo had to settle for 2nd place behind Lewis Hamilton after a pit stop error cost him the victory

In the 3rd practice session of the Monaco Grand Prix, Verstappen had a small crash into the outside barrier of turn three. In Q1, Verstappen clipped the inside barrier in turn fifteen with his front right tire, breaking the steering linkage, pitching the car into the outside barrier of turn sixteen. Ricciardo qualified 1st, securing his first ever pole position, three-tenths of a second faster than 2nd place Rosberg. Verstappen had to apply to the stewards for permission to start the race because he failed to set a qualifying time within the 107% rule. Verstappen elected to start the race from pit lane in front of Felipe Nasr, who also failed to set a time within the 107% rule. The race started behind the safety car due to wet conditions. After the safety car came in, Ricciardo was able to build a thirteen-second gap ahead of Hamilton. Ricciardo came into the pits to switch to intermediate tyres, while Hamilton stayed on the extreme wet weather tyres. Ricciardo was able to reduce the gap to Hamilton to half of a second. Hamilton pitted for dry weather tyres, with Ricciardo following suit the next lap, lap 31. Ricciardo's pit crew did not have tyres ready to put onto his car, resulting in a very long stop, narrowly handing the lead to Hamilton. Ricciardo finished the race in 2nd. After the start of the race, Verstappen was able to fight his way into the top ten. On lap 34, Verstappen crashed into the barriers, retiring himself from the race.

Since the Austrian Grand Prix, the team replaced Ferrari as the best of the rest behind Mercedes, often challenging Mercedes for race victories and finished on the podium at every race except Italy and Abu Dhabi. This was partly due to Verstappen's arrival at the team in Spain which caused Ricciardo to be pushed much more by Verstappen than he was by Kvyat, Ricciardo stating he has learnt from Verstappen's driving techniques in order to improve as a driver.

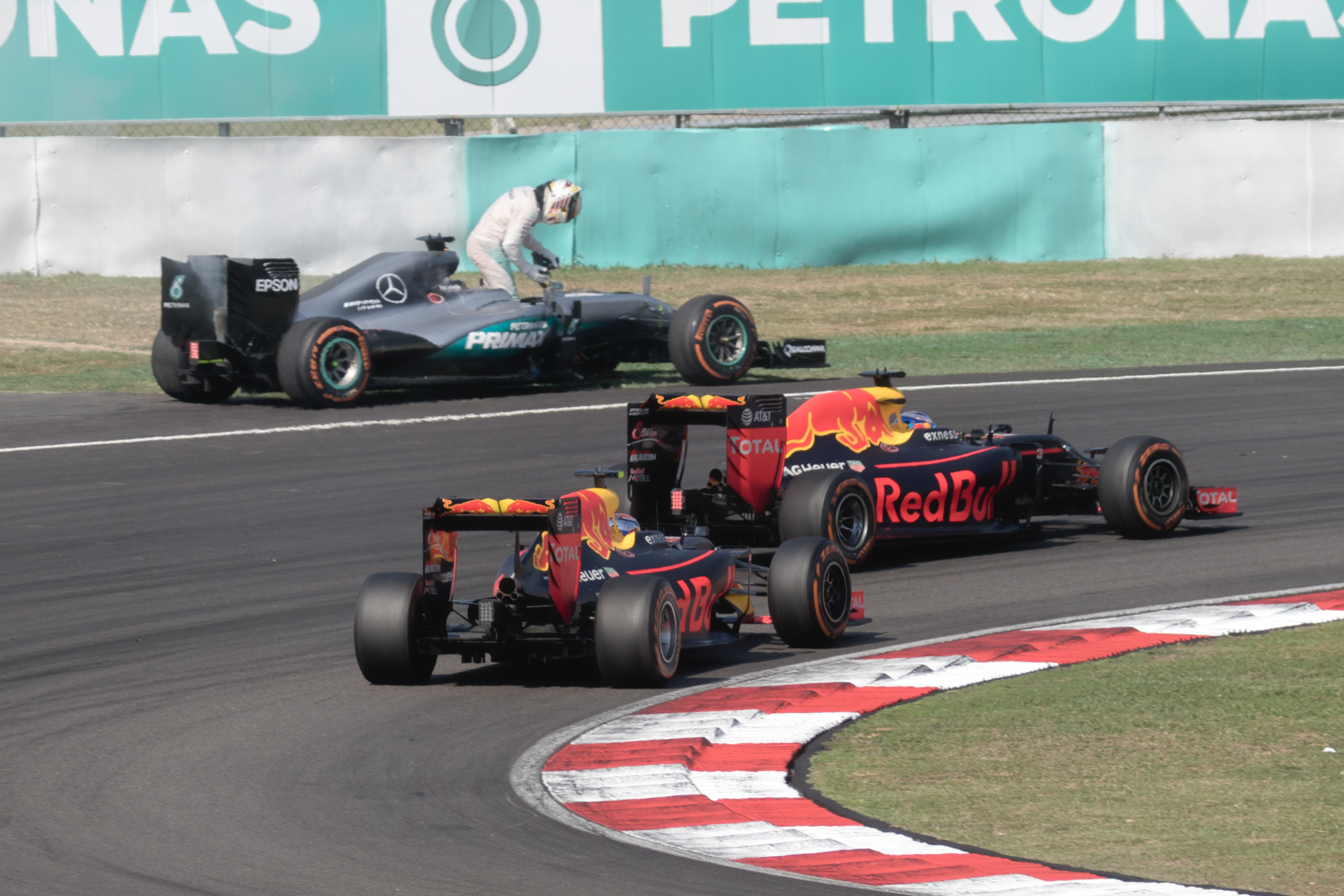
Ricciardo and Verstappen overtake the retiring Hamilton at the Malaysian Grand Prix to take home Ricciardo's first win in two years

At the 2016 Malaysian Grand Prix, the team achieved their first 1–2 in the V6 hybrid era, the first time it has happened since 2013 Brazilian Grand Prix, the last race of the V8 era. This came after both Mercedes drivers encountered issues throughout the race: Nico Rosberg was spun at the start of the race, while Hamilton suffered a dramatic explosion of his Mercedes engine whilst leading comfortably. Therefore, Ricciardo was able to achieve his first race win in more than 2 years, while Verstappen came in 2nd. After this race, Red Bull waited for another 6 years to record a 1–2 finish, which was achieved at the 2022 Emilia Romagna Grand Prix by the Red Bull RB12's distant successor, the RB18.

At the Brazilian Grand Prix, Verstappen and Ricciardo qualified fourth and sixth respectively. In a rain inflicted race, Verstappen barely managed to avoid hitting the guardrail when he spun on the main straight. After an additional tyre change from intermediates back to rain tyres, he ran in 15th place with just 16 laps remaining. He then made several overtakes in the closing laps to eventually finish on the podium in third place. He received considerable praise for his performance, with his team principal Christian Horner calling it "one of the best drives I've seen in Formula 1".

== Sponsorship and livery ==
Red Bull went into the 2016 season with livery changes. The blue tone was changed from a glossy into a dark matte tone. Renewed sponsors including Siemens, Pepe Jeans and Hisense while Casio was dropped. The team also had a strong support deal from Aston Martin since Infiniti was no longer partnered with the team due to partnership breakdown.

== Complete Formula One results ==
(key) (results in bold indicate pole position; results in italics indicate fastest lap)

Year	Entrant	Engine	Tyres	Drivers	Grands Prix																					Points	WCC
Year	Entrant	Engine	Tyres	Drivers	AUS	BHR	CHN	RUS	ESP	MON	CAN	EUR	AUT	GBR	HUN	GER	BEL	ITA	SIN	MAL	JPN	USA	MEX	BRA	ABU	Points	WCC
2016	Red Bull Racing	TAG Heuer F1-2016	**P**																								
2016	Red Bull Racing	TAG Heuer F1-2016	**P**	(Australia) Daniel Ricciardo	4	4	4	11	4	**2**	7	7	5	4	3	2	2	5	2	1	6	3	3	8	5	**468**	**2nd**
2016	Red Bull Racing	TAG Heuer F1-2016	**P**	(Russia) Daniil Kvyat	DNS	7	3	15																		**468**	**2nd**
2016	Red Bull Racing	TAG Heuer F1-2016	**P**	(Netherlands) Max Verstappen					1	Ret	4	8	2	2	5	3	11	7	6	2	2	Ret	4	3	4	**468**	**2nd**
