= 2024 Chinese Grand Prix =

Fifth round of the 2024 F1 season

Race 5 of 24 in the 2024 Formula One World Championship
← Previous race	Next race →
- Layout of the Shanghai International Circuit

Race details
- Date: 21 April 2024
- Official name: Formula 1 Lenovo Chinese Grand Prix 2024
- Location: Shanghai International Circuit; Shanghai, China
- Course: Permanent racing facility
- Course length: 5.451 km (3.387 miles)
- Distance: 56 laps, 305.066 km (189.559 miles)
- Weather: Cloudy
- Attendance: 200,000

Pole position
Driver	(Netherlands) Max Verstappen	Red Bull Racing-Honda RBPT
- Time: 1:33.660

Fastest lap
Driver	(Spain) Fernando Alonso	Aston Martin Aramco-Mercedes
- Time: 1:37.810 on lap 45

Podium
First	(Netherlands) Max Verstappen	Red Bull Racing-Honda RBPT
Second	(United Kingdom) Lando Norris	McLaren-Mercedes
Third	(Mexico) Sergio Pérez	Red Bull Racing-Honda RBPT

The 2024 Chinese Grand Prix (officially known as the Formula 1 Lenovo Chinese Grand Prix 2024) was a Formula One motor race that was held on 21 April 2024 at the Shanghai International Circuit in Shanghai, China. It was the fifth round of the 2024 Formula One World Championship and the first Grand Prix weekend of the season to utilise the sprint format. It was also the first Chinese Grand Prix since 2019 as the planned races from 2020 to 2023 were cancelled due to the COVID-19 pandemic in the country.

Lando Norris of McLaren took sprint pole position in a heavily rain-affected sprint qualifying. Ultimately, both races were won by Max Verstappen of Red Bull Racing, who also took pole position for the main race. Zhou Guanyu became the first Chinese Formula One driver to compete at his home race. Norris finished second in the main race, his 15th career podium, while Verstappen's Red Bull team-mate, Sergio Pérez, finished third, taking his final podium with Red Bull Racing. This is the most recent podium finish achieved by a Mexican driver as of 2026.

== Background ==
The event was held at the Shanghai International Circuit in Shanghai for the 17th time in the circuit's history, and for the first time since the 2019 season due to the COVID-19 pandemic in the country, across the weekend of 19–21 April. The Grand Prix was the fifth round of the 2024 Formula One World Championship and the 17th running of the Chinese Grand Prix.

=== Championship standings before the race ===
Ahead of the weekend race, Max Verstappen led the Drivers' Championship with 77 points, 13 points from his teammate Sergio Pérez in second, and 18 from Charles Leclerc in third. Red Bull Racing led the Constructors' Championship with 141 points, separated from Ferrari by 21 points and from McLaren by 72, in second and third, respectively.

=== Entrants ===
The drivers and teams were the same as the season entry list with no additional stand-in drivers for the race. Zhou Guanyu of Sauber became the first Chinese driver to compete at his home Grand Prix.

=== Tyre choices ===
Tyre supplier Pirelli brought the C2, C3, and C4 tyre compounds (the middle three in their range) designated hard, medium, and soft, respectively, for teams to use at the event.

=== Sprint format ===
The weekend was the first of six in the season to follow the sprint format. The FIA was criticised by some drivers for choosing to run the sprint format at a venue that had not hosted a Formula One race for some years, with drivers concerned that one practice session would be insufficient for them to sufficiently prepare.

== Practice ==
The only free practice session was held on 19 April 2024, at 11:30 local time (UTC+8), and was topped by Lance Stroll of Aston Martin ahead of Oscar Piastri of McLaren and Max Verstappen of Red Bull Racing. A brief red flag period was observed after a patch of grass at the side of the track in turn 7 caught fire.

== Sprint qualifying ==
Sprint qualifying was held on 19 April 2024, at 15:30 local time (UTC+8), and determined the starting grid order for the sprint.

=== Sprint qualifying report ===
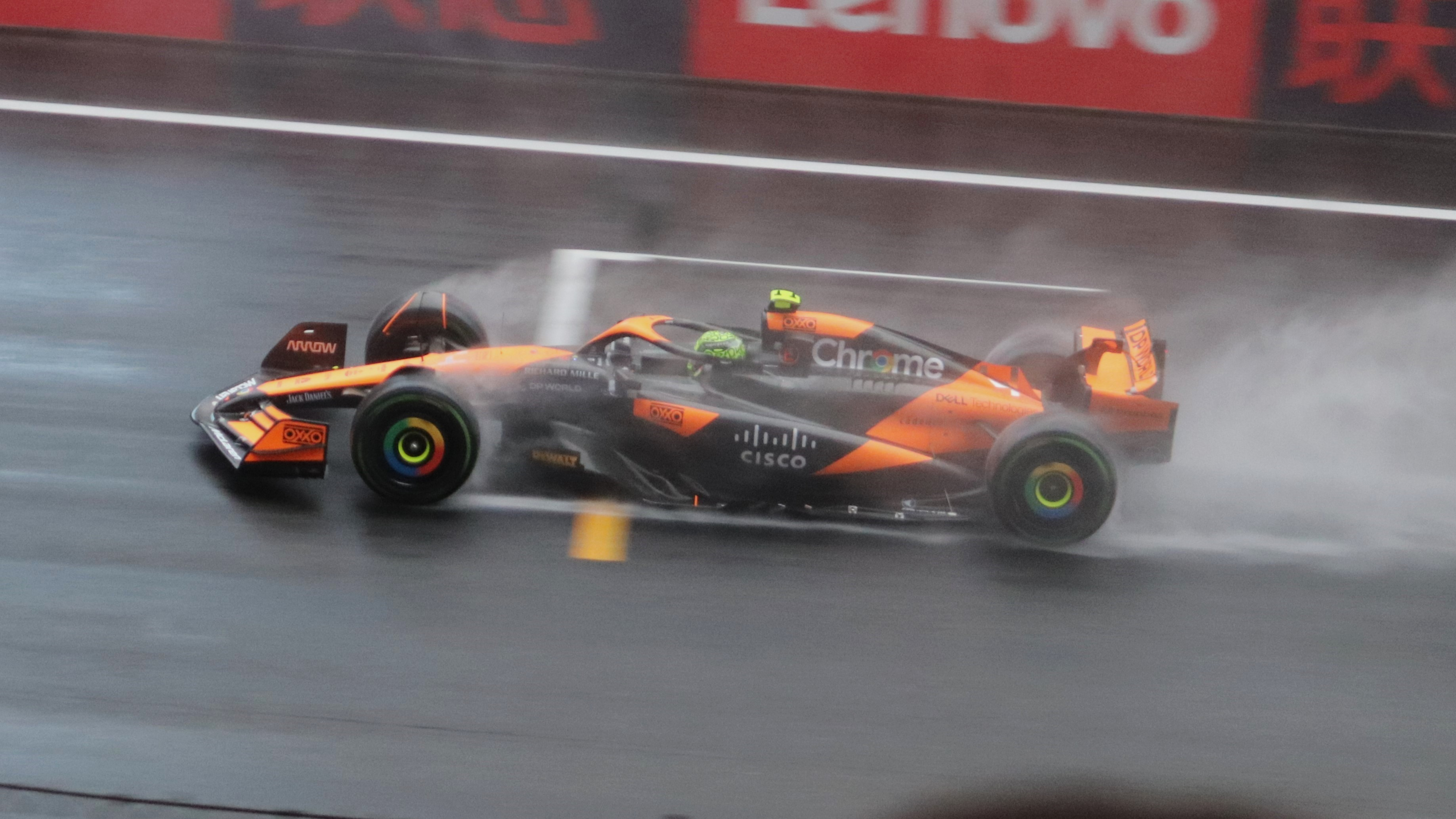
Lando Norris during the sprint qualifying session, in which he took pole

In a session heavily affected by rain, Lando Norris of McLaren took sprint pole position ahead of Lewis Hamilton and Fernando Alonso. Norris's pole position time was initially deleted due to a track limits violation at turn 17 in the preceding lap. However, the time was reinstated, as track limits violations at turn 17 did not result in an automatically invalid lap time (as defined by the race director's notes), and analysis showed that Norris lost time by exceeding track limits. This marked a second consecutive sprint pole for Norris having also achieved sprint pole at the 2023 São Paulo Grand Prix.

The start of the second segment of sprint qualifying (SQ2) was delayed after the same patch of grass that was burned during practice again caught fire. In SQ3, Sauber drivers, Zhou Guanyu and Valtteri Bottas saw their first appearances in the final segment of any type of qualifying for the season, with Zhou going on to qualify 10th and Bottas in 9th.

=== Sprint qualifying classification ===
Pos.	No.	Driver	Constructor	Qualifying times			Sprint grid
Pos.	No.	Driver	Constructor	SQ1	SQ2	SQ3	Sprint grid
1	4	(United Kingdom) Lando Norris	McLaren-Mercedes	1:36.384	1:36.047	1:57.940	1
2	44	(United Kingdom) Lewis Hamilton	Mercedes	1:37.181	1:36.287	1:59.201	2
3	14	(Spain) Fernando Alonso	Aston Martin Aramco-Mercedes	1:36.883	1:36.119	1:59.915	3
4	1	(Netherlands) Max Verstappen	Red Bull Racing-Honda RBPT	1:36.456	1:35.606	2:00.028	4
5	55	(Spain) Carlos Sainz Jr.	Ferrari	1:36.719	1:36.052	2:00.214	5
6	11	(Mexico) Sergio Pérez	Red Bull Racing-Honda RBPT	1:36.110	1:35.781	2:00.375	6
7	16	(Monaco) Charles Leclerc	Ferrari	1:36.537	1:35.711	2:00.566	7
8	81	(Australia) Oscar Piastri	McLaren-Mercedes	1:36.542	1:35.853	2:00.990	8
9	77	(Finland) Valtteri Bottas	Kick Sauber-Ferrari	1:37.112	1:36.056	2:01.044	9
10	24	(China) Zhou Guanyu	Kick Sauber-Ferrari	1:37.544	1:36.307	2:03.537	10
11	63	(United Kingdom) George Russell	Mercedes	1:37.310	1:36.345	N/A	11
12	20	(Denmark) Kevin Magnussen	Haas-Ferrari	1:37.033	1:36.473	N/A	12
13	27	(Germany) Nico Hülkenberg	Haas-Ferrari	1:36.924	1:36.478	N/A	13
14	3	(Australia) Daniel Ricciardo	RB-Honda RBPT	1:37.321	1:36.553	N/A	14
15	18	(Canada) Lance Stroll	Aston Martin Aramco-Mercedes	1:36.961	1:36.677	N/A	15
16	10	(France) Pierre Gasly	Alpine-Renault	1:37.632	N/A	N/A	16
17	31	(France) Esteban Ocon	Alpine-Renault	1:37.720	N/A	N/A	17
18	23	(Thailand) Alexander Albon	Williams-Mercedes	1:37.812	N/A	N/A	18
19	22	(Japan) Yuki Tsunoda	RB-Honda RBPT	1:37.892	N/A	N/A	19
20	2	(United States) Logan Sargeant	Williams-Mercedes	1:37.923	N/A	N/A	20
107% time: 1:42.837

== Sprint ==
The sprint was held on 20 April 2024, at 11:00 local time (UTC+8), and was run for 19 laps.

=== Sprint report ===
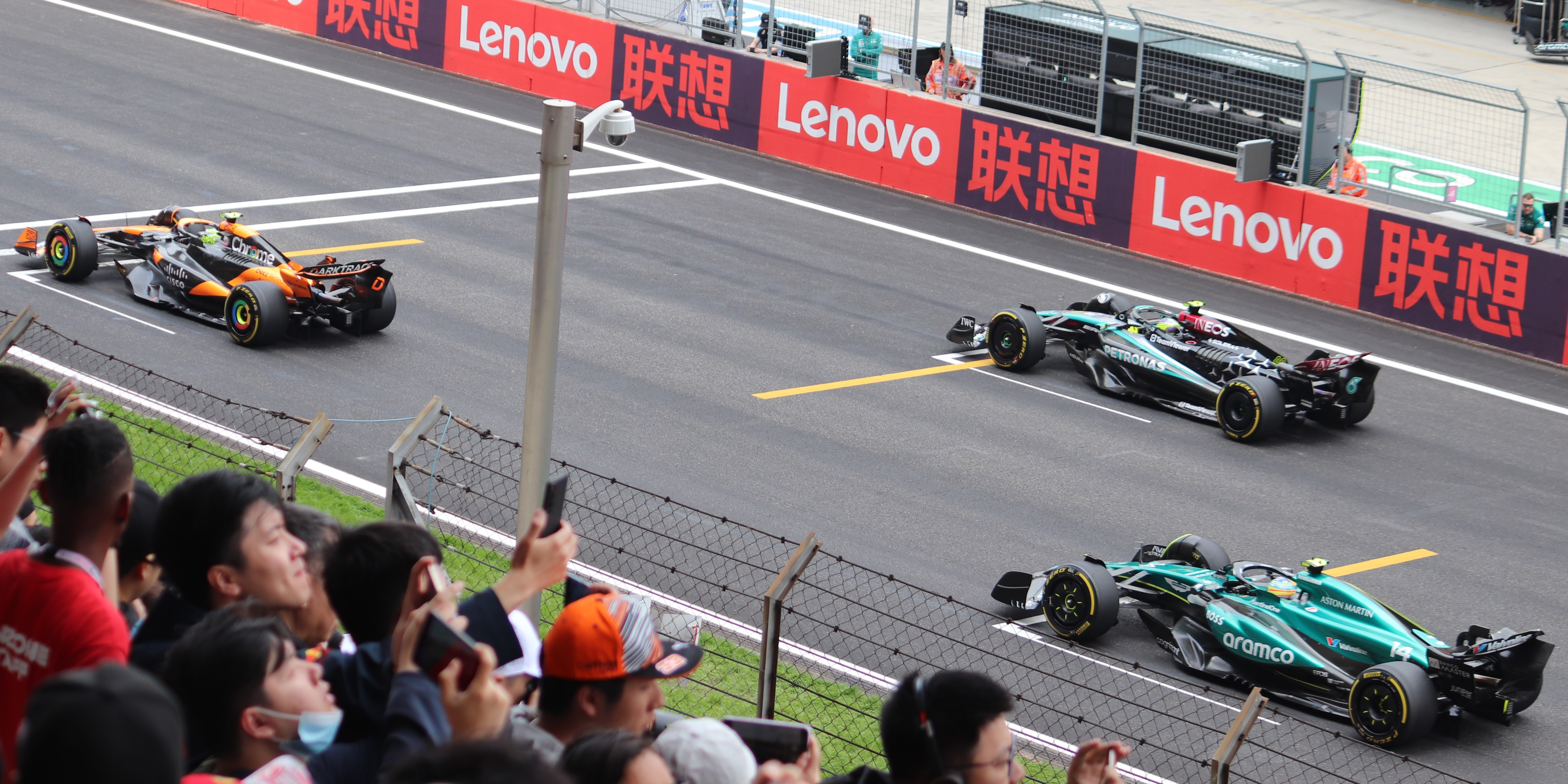
Norris, Hamilton and Alonso starting in top three for the Sprint Race

Verstappen won the sprint ahead of Hamilton and Verstappen's teammate Sergio Pérez. Sprint polesitter Norris dropped down to sixth behind Leclerc and Sainz of Ferrari in fourth and fifth, respectively. Alonso, who started in third, retired from a puncture after a collision with Sainz.

Following the sprint, Alonso was given a ten-second penalty for the collision.

=== Sprint classification ===
Pos.	No.	Driver	Constructor	Laps	Time/Retired	Grid	Points
1	1	(Netherlands) Max Verstappen	Red Bull Racing-Honda RBPT	19	32:04.660	4	8
2	44	(United Kingdom) Lewis Hamilton	Mercedes	19	+13.043	2	7
3	11	(Mexico) Sergio Pérez	Red Bull Racing-Honda RBPT	19	+15.258	6	6
4	16	(Monaco) Charles Leclerc	Ferrari	19	+17.486	7	5
5	55	(Spain) Carlos Sainz Jr.	Ferrari	19	+20.696	5	4
6	4	(United Kingdom) Lando Norris	McLaren-Mercedes	19	+22.088	1	3
7	81	(Australia) Oscar Piastri	McLaren-Mercedes	19	+24.713	8	2
8	63	(United Kingdom) George Russell	Mercedes	19	+25.696	11	1
9	24	(China) Zhou Guanyu	Kick Sauber-Ferrari	19	+31.951	10	
10	20	(Denmark) Kevin Magnussen	Haas-Ferrari	19	+37.398	12	
11	3	(Australia) Daniel Ricciardo	RB-Honda RBPT	19	+37.840	14	
12	77	(Finland) Valtteri Bottas	Kick Sauber-Ferrari	19	+38.295	9	
13	31	(France) Esteban Ocon	Alpine-Renault	19	+39.841	17	
14	18	(Canada) Lance Stroll	Aston Martin Aramco-Mercedes	19	+40.299	15	
15	10	(France) Pierre Gasly	Alpine-Renault	19	+40.838	16	
16	22	(Japan) Yuki Tsunoda	RB-Honda RBPT	19	+41.870	19	
17	23	(Thailand) Alexander Albon	Williams-Mercedes	19	+42.998	18	
18	2	(United States) Logan Sargeant	Williams-Mercedes	19	+46.352	20	
19	27	(Germany) Nico Hülkenberg	Haas-Ferrari	19	+49.630	13	
20^{a}	14	(Spain) Fernando Alonso	Aston Martin Aramco-Mercedes	17	Collision damage	3	
Fastest lap: (Netherlands) Max Verstappen (Red Bull Racing-Honda RBPT) – 1:40.331 (lap 3)

Notes

- ^a – Fernando Alonso was classified as he completed more than 90% of the sprint distance. He also received a post-sprint ten-second time penalty for causing a collision with Carlos Sainz Jr. The penalty made no difference as he was already classified in the last position.

== Qualifying ==
Qualifying was held on 20 April 2024, at 15:00 local time (UTC+8), and determined the starting grid order for the main race.

=== Qualifying report ===
Verstappen set the fastest lap time in all sessions, earning Red Bull Racing's 100th pole position in their history. He was joined by teammate Pérez in the grid's front row ahead of Alonso and Norris in third and fourth respectively. The session was red-flagged in Q2 after Sainz spun out to the barriers in the last turn, breaking off his front wing and was able to continue but change for a new one until Q3 started. Hamilton exited in Q1 for the first time since the 2022 Saudi Arabian Grand Prix.

=== Qualifying classification ===
Pos.	No.	Driver	Constructor	Qualifying times			Final grid
Pos.	No.	Driver	Constructor	Q1	Q2	Q3	Final grid
1	1	(Netherlands) Max Verstappen	Red Bull Racing-Honda RBPT	1:34.742	1:33.794	1:33.660	1
2	11	(Mexico) Sergio Pérez	Red Bull Racing-Honda RBPT	1:35.457	1:34.026	1:33.982	2
3	14	(Spain) Fernando Alonso	Aston Martin Aramco-Mercedes	1:35.116	1:34.652	1:34.148	3
4	4	(United Kingdom) Lando Norris	McLaren-Mercedes	1:34.842	1:34.460	1:34.165	4
5	81	(Australia) Oscar Piastri	McLaren-Mercedes	1:35.014	1:34.659	1:34.273	5
6	16	(Monaco) Charles Leclerc	Ferrari	1:34.797	1:34.399	1:34.289	6
7	55	(Spain) Carlos Sainz Jr.	Ferrari	1:34.970	1:34.368	1:34.297	7
8	63	(United Kingdom) George Russell	Mercedes	1:35.084	1:34.609	1:34.433	8
9	27	(Germany) Nico Hülkenberg	Haas-Ferrari	1:35.068	1:34.667	1:34.604	9
10	77	(Finland) Valtteri Bottas	Kick Sauber-Ferrari	1:35.169	1:34.769	1:34.665	10
11	18	(Canada) Lance Stroll	Aston Martin Aramco-Mercedes	1:35.334	1:34.838	N/A	11
12	3	(Australia) Daniel Ricciardo	RB-Honda RBPT	1:35.443	1:34.934	N/A	12
13	31	(France) Esteban Ocon	Alpine-Renault	1:35.356	1:35.223	N/A	13
14	23	(Thailand) Alexander Albon	Williams-Mercedes	1:35.384	1:35.241	N/A	14
15	10	(France) Pierre Gasly	Alpine-Renault	1:35.287	1:35.463	N/A	15
16	24	(China) Zhou Guanyu	Kick Sauber-Ferrari	1:35.505	N/A	N/A	16
17	20	(Denmark) Kevin Magnussen	Haas-Ferrari	1:35.516	N/A	N/A	17
18	44	(United Kingdom) Lewis Hamilton	Mercedes	1:35.573	N/A	N/A	18
19	22	(Japan) Yuki Tsunoda	RB-Honda RBPT	1:35.746	N/A	N/A	19
20	2	(United States) Logan Sargeant	Williams-Mercedes	1:36.358	N/A	N/A	PL^{a}
107% time: 1:41.373

Notes

- ^a – Logan Sargeant qualified 20th, but was required to start the race from the pit lane as his car was modified during parc fermé conditions.

== Race ==
The race was held on 21 April 2024, at 15:00 local time (UTC+8), and was run for 56 laps.

=== Race report ===
Logan Sargeant started the race from the pit lane after his Williams team broke parc fermé conditions. As the race began, Fernando Alonso moved his Aston Martin ahead of Sergio Pérez of Red Bull Racing to slide into second place behind the other Red Bull Racing of Max Verstappen, who proceeded to create a large gap. Pérez soon regained the position as brief contact between Nico Hülkenberg of Haas and Alonso's Aston Martin teammate Lance Stroll was observed and investigated by stewards. A similar instance between Alexander Albon and Pierre Gasly of Alpine was also investigated.

The drivers began their first routine pit stops on lap nine. However, Pierre Gasly pulled away from his box sooner than expected, before all four tyres were fitted, causing an engineer to fall over. While no major injuries were reported, Alpine was fined €10,000 after the race for the unsafe procedure. While Max Verstappen made his stop, Lando Norris stayed out, allowing him to briefly inherit the lead of the race. Soon, Valtteri Bottas's Sauber ground to a halt, his engine expiring as he went into turn 11. Marshals struggled to move the car as it appeared to be stuck in gear, facilitating double-waved yellow flags before it was decided that a virtual safety car period was required. During this period of time, numerous drivers who had not yet made their pit stops opted to change their tyres as the virtual safety car period transitioned into a full safety car period. During this period of time, drivers decided to box once more, with Zhou Guanyu in particular suffering a slow stop.

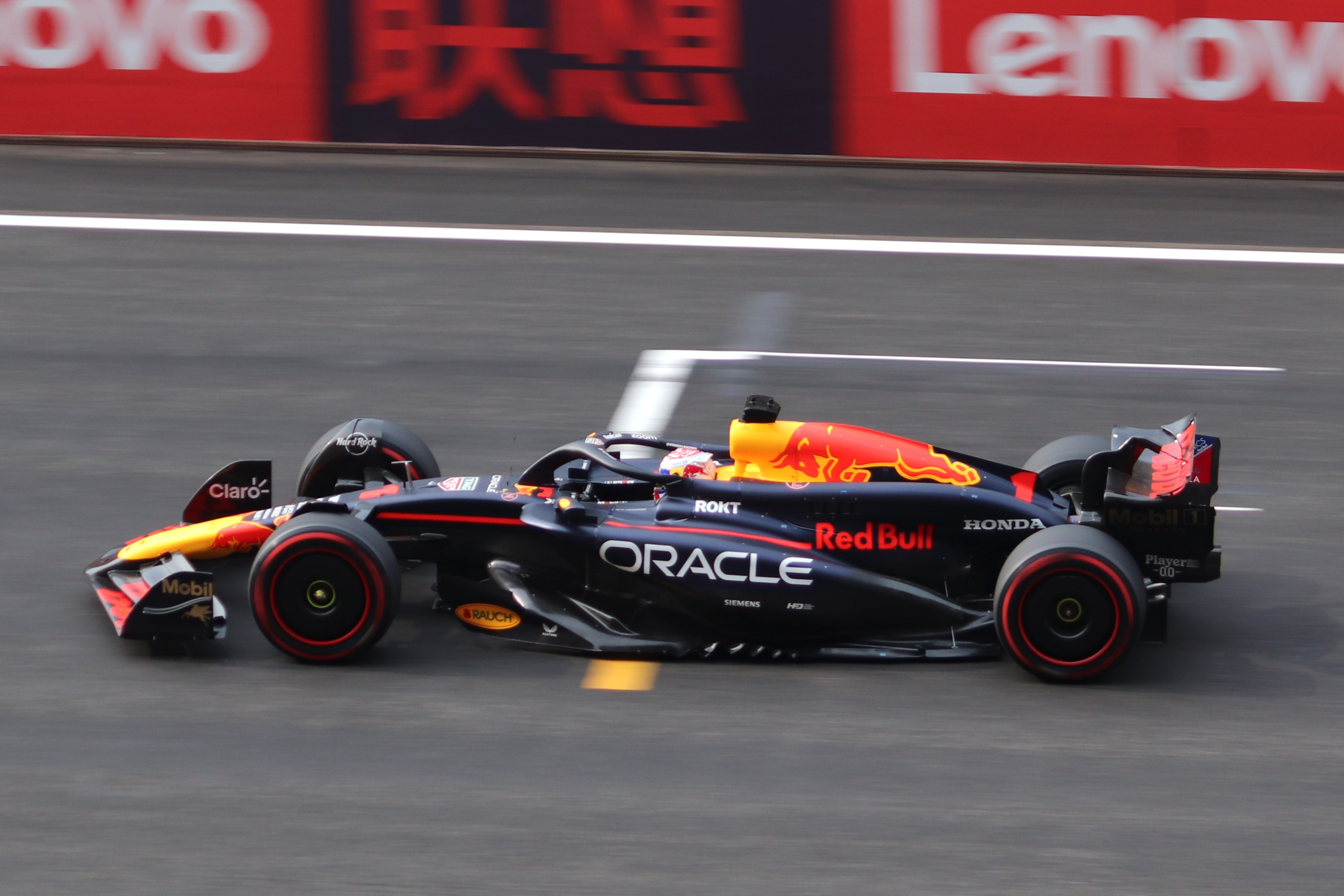
Verstappen took his fourth victory of the season.

The safety car was called in on lap 26. During the restart, Alonso locked up into turn 14, creating a concertina effect which culminated into Lance Stroll hitting the rear of Ricciardo's car, pitching it upward from the impact and pushing it into the McLaren of Oscar Piastri. Both Ricciardo and Piastri suffered major damage to their diffusers, with the former being forced to retire a few laps later. Piastri carried on but with reduced performance. Stroll was given a ten-second penalty and two penalty points by the steward. In an interview following the race, Ricciardo, who had a chance to score his first points of the season, revealed that he was displeased with the crash, criticising Stroll's lack of responsibility regarding the incident. After the restart, RB's Yuki Tsunoda was sent into a spin by Kevin Magnussen in turn 6. Tsunoda suffered terminal rear-right damage and retired on the spot, and marshals also had trouble moving the car. Magnussen continued and completed the race at 15th place, but was demoted to 16th after being given a 10-second penalty for causing the collision Stewards investigated a safety car infringement involving Sargeant and Hülkenberg, penalising the former with a ten-second penalty.

The two incidents facilitated a second safety car period, with drivers opting to change their tyres once more; Alonso took the soft tyres over hards, so he had to stop once again later on to swap to mediums. Ricciardo overtook Nico Hülkenberg during this safety car period; stewards imposed a ten-second penalty for Ricciardo, turned into a three-place grid drop as he could not serve the penalty, in the following Miami Grand Prix. The safety car period ended on lap 31, with Verstappen leading the race ahead of Norris and Charles Leclerc of Ferrari. During this period, Alonso's car snapped at the final straight, but swiftly recovered to gain DRS, and Stroll and Magnussen, who both had ten-second penalties, had a brief battle for sixteenth. Stroll won the battle after he passed Magnussen on the first two turns. Meanwhile, Zhou and Gasly battled against Sargeant, with Gasly displeased with Sargeant's defence. Zhou passed Magnussen to finish fourteenth in his first home race and received a celebratory parking spot in his honour after he finished.

The race was won by Max Verstappen of Red Bull Racing, with Lando Norris behind him and Verstappen's teammate Sergio Pérez completing the podium. Fernando Alonso achieved the fastest lap of the race. The result saw Verstappen extend his lead in the World Drivers' Championship to 25 points over Pérez. Charles Leclerc retained third spot with 76 points, seven clear from his teammate Carlos Sainz Jr. In the World Constructors' Championship, the top five remained unchanged, with Red Bull Racing extending their lead over Ferrari to 44 points.

=== Race classification ===
Pos.	No.	Driver	Constructor	Laps	Time/Retired	Grid	Points
1	1	(Netherlands) Max Verstappen	Red Bull Racing-Honda RBPT	56	1:40:52.554	1	25
2	4	(United Kingdom) Lando Norris	McLaren-Mercedes	56	+13.773	4	18
3	11	(Mexico) Sergio Pérez	Red Bull Racing-Honda RBPT	56	+19.160	2	15
4	16	(Monaco) Charles Leclerc	Ferrari	56	+23.623	6	12
5	55	(Spain) Carlos Sainz Jr.	Ferrari	56	+33.983	7	10
6	63	(United Kingdom) George Russell	Mercedes	56	+38.724	8	8
7	14	(Spain) Fernando Alonso	Aston Martin Aramco-Mercedes	56	+43.414	3	7^{a}
8	81	(Australia) Oscar Piastri	McLaren-Mercedes	56	+56.198	5	4
9	44	(United Kingdom) Lewis Hamilton	Mercedes	56	+57.986	18	2
10	27	(Germany) Nico Hülkenberg	Haas-Ferrari	56	+1:00.476	9	1
11	31	(France) Esteban Ocon	Alpine-Renault	56	+1:02.812	13	
12	23	(Thailand) Alexander Albon	Williams-Mercedes	56	+1:05.506	14	
13	10	(France) Pierre Gasly	Alpine-Renault	56	+1:09.223	15	
14	24	(China) Zhou Guanyu	Kick Sauber-Ferrari	56	+1:11.689	16	
15	18	(Canada) Lance Stroll	Aston Martin Aramco-Mercedes	56	+1:22.786	11	
16	20	(Denmark) Kevin Magnussen	Haas-Ferrari	56	+1:27.533^{b}	17	
17	2	(United States) Logan Sargeant	Williams-Mercedes	56	+1:35.110^{c}	PL	
Ret	3	(Australia) Daniel Ricciardo	RB-Honda RBPT	33	Collision damage	12	
Ret	22	(Japan) Yuki Tsunoda	RB-Honda RBPT	26	Collision	19	
Ret	77	(Finland) Valtteri Bottas	Kick Sauber-Ferrari	19	Engine	10	
Fastest lap: (Spain) Fernando Alonso (Aston Martin Aramco-Mercedes) – 1:37.810 (lap 45)

Notes

- ^a – Includes one point for fastest lap.
- ^b – Kevin Magnussen finished 15th, but received a ten-second time penalty for causing a collision with Yuki Tsunoda.
- ^c – Logan Sargeant received a ten-second time penalty for overtaking Nico Hülkenberg under safety car conditions. His final position was not affected by the penalty as he was classified last.

== Championship standings after the race ==
Drivers' Championship standings

Pos.	Driver	Points
1	(Netherlands) Max Verstappen	110
2	(Mexico) Sergio Pérez	85
3	(Monaco) Charles Leclerc	76
4	(Spain) Carlos Sainz Jr.	69
5	(United Kingdom) Lando Norris	58

Constructors' Championship standings

Pos.	Constructor	Points
1	(Austria) Red Bull Racing-Honda RBPT	195
2	(Italy) Ferrari	151
3	(United Kingdom) McLaren-Mercedes	96
4	(Germany) Mercedes	52
5	(United Kingdom) Aston Martin Aramco-Mercedes	40

- Note: Only the top five positions are included for both sets of standings.

Previous race: 2024 Japanese Grand Prix	FIA Formula One World Championship; 2024 season	Next race: 2024 Miami Grand Prix
Previous race: 2019 Chinese Grand Prix	Chinese Grand Prix	Next race: 2025 Chinese Grand Prix
