= Chinese Grand Prix =

Formula One Grand Prix

- Shanghai International Circuit

Race information
- Number of times held: 19
- First held: 2004
- Most wins (drivers): (United Kingdom) Lewis Hamilton (6)
- Most wins (constructors): (Germany) Mercedes (7)
- Circuit length: 5.451 km (3.387 miles)
- Race length: 305.066 km (189.559 miles)
- Laps: 56

Last race (2026)

Pole position
- (Italy) Kimi Antonelli; Mercedes; 1:32.064

Podium
- 1. (Italy) K. Antonelli; Mercedes; 1:33:15.607; 2. (United Kingdom) G. Russell; Mercedes; +5.515; 3. (United Kingdom) L. Hamilton; Ferrari; +25.267

Fastest lap
- (Italy) Kimi Antonelli; Mercedes; 1:35.275

The Chinese Grand Prix (Chinese: 中国大奖赛; pinyin: Zhōngguó Dàjiǎngsài) is a round of the Formula One World Championship. The event was held every year from 2004 until 2019 before it was suspended from 2020 to 2023 due to the COVID-19 pandemic in China. The event resumed in 2024 and is contracted to be held until 2030.

It is currently held at the Shanghai International Circuit, Jiading, Shanghai. Designed by Hermann Tilke and opened in 2004, the US$240 million Shanghai course was the most expensive Formula One circuit facility until the $6 billion Abu Dhabi course opened five years later. The 5.451 km (3.387 mi) track features one of the trickiest corner combinations on the Formula One calendar: Turn 1 and 2, a demanding 270-degree, right-handed corner combination whose radius decreases as the corner progresses.

== History ==
In the early 1990s, the Chinese government began seeking to host an F1 race. After the Zhuhai International Circuit was opened in 1996 in the city of Zhuhai in Guangdong Province, southern China, a race there was provisionally added to the 1999 F1 World Championship calendar. However, the track failed to meet FIA standard resulting in the race being cancelled.

In 2002, it was announced that the management of the Shanghai International Circuit, with assistance from the organizers of the Macau Grand Prix, had signed a seven-year contract with Formula One Management to host the Chinese Grand Prix from 2004 until 2011. The first Chinese Grand Prix, held on 26 September 2004, was won by Ferrari's Rubens Barrichello. The following year, it hosted the final round of the Formula One championship, in which the newly crowned world champion Fernando Alonso won and claimed the constructor's title for Renault. In 2006, the Chinese Grand Prix was won by Michael Schumacher, his last victory in Formula One.

In November 2008, the BBC reported that a senior race official, Qiu Weichang, had suggested that the money-losing race might be cancelled. Following a similar announcement about the French Grand Prix, Qiu said that the race's future was under consideration, and a decision would be made in 2009.

2010 came and went with no formal announcement of an extension to the initial seven-race deal struck in 2004. However, immediately after the 2010 Shanghai race Bernie Ecclestone, who manages the contracts with the various circuits, said of the 2011 calendar, "We are not dropping anything. [It's] 20 races – getting ready for 25".

It was only in February 2011 that a deal was agreed between F1 and the organisers of the Chinese round of the world championship. Reasons for the delay appear to have been over the fee paid to F1 to host the race. After racking up losses year after year, the organisers of the race refused to pay the fee required, reported to be amongst the highest paid to host an F1 race. F1 bosses appear to have reduced the fee and the new agreement to host an F1 race ran to 2017.

In September 2017, a new three-year contract to host the race was announced, keeping the race on the calendar until 2020. In 2019 it hosted the 1000th round of the Formula One World Championship.

The 2020 Grand Prix, scheduled for 19 April, was postponed and later cancelled due to the COVID-19 pandemic. Plans for 2021, 2022 and 2023 races were announced and later cancelled. The Grand Prix returned to the Formula One calendar in 2024.

== Winners ==
=== By year ===
All Chinese Grands Prix have been held at Shanghai International Circuit.

Year	Driver	Constructor	Report
2004	(Brazil) Rubens Barrichello	Ferrari	Report
2005	(Spain) Fernando Alonso	Renault	Report
2006	(Germany) Michael Schumacher	Ferrari	Report
2007	(Finland) Kimi Räikkönen	Ferrari	Report
2008	(United Kingdom) Lewis Hamilton	McLaren-Mercedes	Report
2009	(Germany) Sebastian Vettel	Red Bull Racing-Renault	Report
2010	(United Kingdom) Jenson Button	McLaren-Mercedes	Report
2011	(United Kingdom) Lewis Hamilton	McLaren-Mercedes	Report
2012	(Germany) Nico Rosberg	Mercedes	Report
2013	(Spain) Fernando Alonso	Ferrari	Report
2014	(United Kingdom) Lewis Hamilton	Mercedes	Report
2015	(United Kingdom) Lewis Hamilton	Mercedes	Report
2016	(Germany) Nico Rosberg	Mercedes	Report
2017	(United Kingdom) Lewis Hamilton	Mercedes	Report
2018	(Australia) Daniel Ricciardo	Red Bull Racing-TAG Heuer	Report
2019	(United Kingdom) Lewis Hamilton	Mercedes	Report
2020 – 2023	Not held due to the COVID-19 pandemic		
2024	(Netherlands) Max Verstappen	Red Bull Racing-Honda RBPT	Report
2025	(Australia) Oscar Piastri	McLaren-Mercedes	Report
2026	(Italy) Kimi Antonelli	Mercedes	Report

=== Repeat winners (drivers) ===
Drivers in bold are competing in the Formula One championship in 2026.

Wins	Driver	Years won
6	(United Kingdom) **Lewis Hamilton**	2008, 2011, 2014, 2015, 2017, 2019
2	(Spain) **Fernando Alonso**	2005, 2013
2	(Germany) Nico Rosberg	2012, 2016

=== Repeat winners (constructors) ===
Teams in bold are competing in the Formula One championship in 2026.

Wins	Constructor	Years won
7	(Germany) **Mercedes**	2012, 2014, 2015, 2016, 2017, 2019, 2026
4	(Italy) **Ferrari**	2004, 2006, 2007, 2013
4	(United Kingdom) **McLaren**	2008, 2010, 2011, 2025
3	(Austria) **Red Bull**	2009, 2018, 2024

=== Repeat winners (engine manufacturers) ===
Manufacturers in bold are competing in the Formula One championship in 2026.

Wins	Manufacturer	Years won
11	(Germany) **Mercedes**	2008, 2010, 2011, 2012, 2014, 2015, 2016, 2017, 2019, 2025, 2026
4	(Italy) **Ferrari**	2004, 2006, 2007, 2013
2	(France) Renault	2005, 2009

== Support races ==
In 2004, Formula BMW Asia, Porsche Carrera Cup Asia and Asian Formula Renault Challenge supported the inaugural Chinese Grand Prix. The latter was not retained in 2005. In 2008, GP2 Asia Series became a support event while Formula BMW Asia was renamed Formula BMW Pacific. 2009 saw Porsche Carrera Cup Asia as the only support event. It remained this way until TCR International Series became a support event in 2015, although this lasted only one year. In 2019, the China Formula Grand Prix and Shell Helix FIA F4 Chinese Championship became support events. F1 Academy became a support event since 2025.
