= 2016 Chinese Grand Prix =

3rd round of the 2016 Formula One season

Race 3 of 21 in the 2016 Formula One World Championship
← Previous race	Next race →

Race details
- Date: 17 April 2016
- Official name: 2016 Formula 1 Pirelli Chinese Grand Prix
- Location: Shanghai International Circuit, Shanghai, China
- Course: Permanent racing facility
- Course length: 5.451 km (3.387 miles)
- Distance: 56 laps, 305.066 km (189.559 miles)
- Weather: Sunny; 21 °C (70 °F) air temperature 37 °C (99 °F) track temperature 4.8 m/s (16 ft/s) wind from the northeast
- Attendance: 140,000 (Weekend)

Pole position
Driver	(Germany) Nico Rosberg	Mercedes
- Time: 1:35.402

Fastest lap
Driver	(Germany) Nico Hülkenberg	Force India-Mercedes
- Time: 1:39.824 on lap 48

Podium
First	(Germany) Nico Rosberg	Mercedes
Second	(Germany) Sebastian Vettel	Ferrari
Third	(Russia) Daniil Kvyat	Red Bull Racing-TAG Heuer

The 2016 Chinese Grand Prix (formally known as the 2016 Formula 1 Pirelli Chinese Grand Prix) was a Formula One motor race which was held on 17 April 2016 at the Shanghai International Circuit in Shanghai, China. The race was the third round of the 2016 FIA Formula One World Championship, and marked the thirteenth time that the Chinese Grand Prix has been run as a round of the Formula One World Championship. The race was convincingly won by Nico Rosberg, who finished over 30 seconds ahead of second-placed Sebastian Vettel. Defending world champion Lewis Hamilton suffered a number of setbacks both in qualifying and during the race itself, eventually finishing in 7th place.

Until the 2023 Dutch Grand Prix, this race had a record-breaking 161 overtakes, breaking the previous record of 147 set at the 2012 Brazilian Grand Prix.

== Report ==
=== Background ===
Following widespread criticism of the controversial "elimination" qualifying format used in Australia and Bahrain, the system was abandoned for the Chinese Grand Prix and the three-period system used between 2006 and 2015 was reintroduced.

Fernando Alonso returned to racing for the McLaren team after being ruled out of the Bahrain Grand Prix due to injuries sustained during an accident in the Australian Grand Prix.

Tyre supplier Pirelli brought the medium, soft and super-soft tyres for this race weekend.

=== Free practice ===
Per the regulations for the 2016 season, two ninety-minute practice sessions were held on Friday and another one-hour session was held before qualifying on Saturday. In the first session, Nico Rosberg was fastest, setting a time of 1:38.037, 0.146 seconds ahead of teammate Hamilton, with Sebastian Vettel in third. There was an early red flag period as Felipe Massa spun out in turn 6, triggered by a deflated left rear tyre, which reoccurred when he came back to the track later in the session. A similar problem caught out Kevin Magnussen later on, who suffered a broken suspension in the process and crashed. This debris brought out the red flag again. Overall, about thirty minutes of runtime were lost due to the pauses. Lewis Hamilton had set the early tempo, but spun out twice at turn 11, reporting issues with his brakes. Championship leader Nico Rosberg was not without problems as well, as he nursed his car back into pitlane near the end of the session, caused by a fault in the power unit.

The two Ferrari drivers topped the timesheets in the second session on Friday afternoon, with Kimi Räikkönen one tenth of a second ahead of Vettel. Rosberg and Hamilton were third and fourth respectively, ahead of Daniel Ricciardo and Max Verstappen. After quick laps on the supersoft tyre compounds, the teams then turned to race simulation runs on higher fuel loads, with Mercedes splitting their drivers on the soft and medium compounds, while Ferrari continued their long runs on the supersoft tyres. Esteban Gutiérrez encountered problems when his rear brakes caught fire, causing him to spend much of the session in the garage. Following his crash in the first session, Magnussen did not take part as his team investigated the reason for his tyre failure.

Ferrari were again on top in the third practice session on Saturday morning, as Vettel set the fastest time. Rain had fallen before the session and only eased off halfway into the sixty minute practice, leading to the cars staying inside the garages until fifteen minutes in. It was not until thirty minutes in that Räikkönen was the first to set a timed lap. Vettel did not head onto the track until there were just 22 minutes remaining. By this stage, the surface had dried out enough for intermediate tyres. Eventually, Vettel set a time of 1:57.351, seven-tenths of a second ahead of Valtteri Bottas and more than a second faster than third placed Sergio Pérez. Only 14 drivers set a timed lap, with both Mercedes cars and others just taking a few installation laps. Marcus Ericsson was confined to just one short outing, after a technical problem had kept him in the pitlane for most of the session.

=== Race ===
Daniel Ricciardo beat pole-sitter Nico Rosberg into the first corner for the lead. Behind the pair Sebastian Vettel collided with his teammate Kimi Räikkönen while trying to avoid Red Bull Racing's Daniil Kvyat (Vettel would subsequently dub Kvyat "The Torpedo" for his role in the incident). Both Ferraris were able to continue the race. Further down the pack Romain Grosjean picked up some damage as well, while Lewis Hamilton collided with Felipe Nasr and got his front wing caught under his car. Räikkönen, Grosjean, Hamilton and Nasr all made a pit-stop at the end of the first lap. Ricciardo kept the lead until his left-rear tyre failed during lap 3 on the long straight between turns 13 and 14. Rosberg overtook him and he swiftly went to the pit lane for a new set of tyres, dropping him down the field. One lap later the Safety Car was deployed to allow the stewards to clear debris from the track. Kvyat, Pérez, Vettel, Hülkenberg, Sainz, Button, Bottas, Verstappen, Ericsson and Magnussen all elected to make a pit-stop during this safety car period to pick up fresh tyres. Vettel had his damaged front wing changed as well. Rosberg elected to stay out, however. Hamilton came to the pit lane as well, but returned just one lap later to change his set of red-banded supersoft tyres for a set of yellow-banded soft ones.

After 9 laps, the order was as follows: Rosberg, Massa, Alonso, Wehrlein, Gutiérrez, Kvyat, Palmer, Pérez, Bottas, Button. One lap later the Safety Car returned to the pit lane and normal racing resumed. Rosberg quickly created a gap between him and the cars behind, while Kvyat climbed into fourth place. Both Vettel and Hamilton started to move through the field after having dropped back to 15th and 21st, respectively, due to their pitstops. A second round of pitstops occurred from lap 15 until lap 21, concluding with Rosberg coming in for just his first stop having amassed a comfortable lead and Hamilton making his fourth stop. Rosberg now led ahead of Kvyat, while Vettel climbed into 3rd position ahead of Massa, Pérez, Ericsson, Bottas, Alonso and Sainz.

Alonso was quickly overtaken by faster cars behind him, dropping outside of the top ten by lap 27. The top four remained unchanged until Massa switched tyres in lap 31. Four laps later, Kvyat and Vettel came into the pit lane simultaneously at the end of lap 35. Kvyat stayed ahead initially, but the German overtook him during the next lap. The top three then remained unchallenged for the remainder of the race. The result marked Kvyat’s second career podium finish, placing third behind Rosberg and Vettel. Ricciardo passed Hamilton and Massa to take fourth place during lap 43, and was able to keep the position until the end. Hamilton climbed as high as fifth position but was unable to pass the Williams of Massa and was then overtaken himself by Ricciardo and Räikkönen, settling for seventh place. Bottas seemed to be heading for 8th place until he was overtaken by teammates Verstappen and Sainz within the last three laps, thus ultimately taking tenth place. Pérez took eleventh place ahead of the McLarens of Alonso and Button. Hülkenberg finished 14th and Gutiérrez 15th. Ericsson, Magnussen, Wehrlein, Grosjean, Nasr, Haryanto and Palmer rounded-up the finishers, ensuring that the entire grid had finished the race.

Nico Rosberg took his third victory of the season and his sixth in a row. He extended his championship lead to 36 points.

== Classification ==
=== Qualifying ===
Pos.	Car no.	Driver	Constructor	Qualifying times			Final grid
Pos.	Car no.	Driver	Constructor	Q1	Q2	Q3	Final grid
1	6	(Germany) Nico Rosberg	Mercedes	1:37.669	1:36.240	1:35.402	1
2	3	(Australia) Daniel Ricciardo	Red Bull Racing-TAG Heuer	1:37.672	1:36.815	1:35.917	2
3	7	(Finland) Kimi Räikkönen	Ferrari	1:37.347	1:36.118	1:35.972	3
4	5	(Germany) Sebastian Vettel	Ferrari	1:37.001	1:36.183	1:36.246	4
5	77	(Finland) Valtteri Bottas	Williams-Mercedes	1:37.537	1:36.831	1:36.296	5
6	26	(Russia) Daniil Kvyat	Red Bull Racing-TAG Heuer	1:37.719	1:36.948	1:36.399	6
7	11	(Mexico) Sergio Pérez	Force India-Mercedes	1:38.096	1:37.149	1:36.865	7
8	55	(Spain) Carlos Sainz Jr.	Toro Rosso-Ferrari	1:37.656	1:37.204	1:36.881	8
9	33	(Netherlands) Max Verstappen	Toro Rosso-Ferrari	1:38.181	1:37.265	1:37.194	9
10	27	(Germany) Nico Hülkenberg	Force India-Mercedes	1:38.165	1:37.333	No time	13^{1}
11	19	(Brazil) Felipe Massa	Williams-Mercedes	1:38.016	1:37.347		10
12	14	(Spain) Fernando Alonso	McLaren-Honda	1:38.451	1:38.826		11
13	22	(United Kingdom) Jenson Button	McLaren-Honda	1:37.593	1:39.093		12
14	8	(France) Romain Grosjean	Haas-Ferrari	1:38.425	1:39.830		14
15	9	(Sweden) Marcus Ericsson	Sauber-Ferrari	1:38.321	1:40.742		15
16	12	(Brazil) Felipe Nasr	Sauber-Ferrari	1:38.654	1:42.430		16
17	20	(Denmark) Kevin Magnussen	Renault	1:38.673			17
18	21	(Mexico) Esteban Gutiérrez	Haas-Ferrari	1:38.770			18
19	30	(United Kingdom) Jolyon Palmer	Renault	1:39.528			19
20	88	(Indonesia) Rio Haryanto	MRT-Mercedes	1:40.264			20
107% time: 1:43.791
—	94	(Germany) Pascal Wehrlein	MRT-Mercedes	No time			21^{2}
—	44	(United Kingdom) Lewis Hamilton	Mercedes	No time			22^{3}

Notes

- ^1 – Nico Hülkenberg received a three-place grid penalty for having been released from the pit lane in an unsafe condition during Q2.
- ^2 – Pascal Wehrlein failed to set a time within 107% of the fastest lap during Q1. He was allowed to start at the stewards' discretion.
- ^3 – Lewis Hamilton had already incurred a five-place grid penalty for an unscheduled gearbox change when he failed to post a qualifying time. He was granted permission to race by the stewards, before the penalty was applied and he was moved to the back of the grid.

=== Race ===
Pos.	No.	Driver	Constructor	Laps	Time/Retired	Grid	Pts.
1	6	(Germany) Nico Rosberg	Mercedes	56	1:38:53.891	1	25
2	5	(Germany) Sebastian Vettel	Ferrari	56	+37.776	4	18
3	26	(Russia) Daniil Kvyat	Red Bull Racing-TAG Heuer	56	+45.936	6	15
4	3	(Australia) Daniel Ricciardo	Red Bull Racing-TAG Heuer	56	+52.688	2	12
5	7	(Finland) Kimi Räikkönen	Ferrari	56	+1:05.872	3	10
6	19	(Brazil) Felipe Massa	Williams-Mercedes	56	+1:15.511	10	8
7	44	(United Kingdom) Lewis Hamilton	Mercedes	56	+1:18.230	22	6
8	33	(Netherlands) Max Verstappen	Toro Rosso-Ferrari	56	+1:19.268	9	4
9	55	(Spain) Carlos Sainz Jr.	Toro Rosso-Ferrari	56	+1:24.127	8	2
10	77	(Finland) Valtteri Bottas	Williams-Mercedes	56	+1:26.192	5	1
11	11	(Mexico) Sergio Pérez	Force India-Mercedes	56	+1:34.283	7	
12	14	(Spain) Fernando Alonso	McLaren-Honda	56	+1:37.253	11	
13	22	(United Kingdom) Jenson Button	McLaren-Honda	56	+1:41.990	12	
14	21	(Mexico) Esteban Gutiérrez	Haas-Ferrari	55	+1 Lap	18	
15	27	(Germany) Nico Hülkenberg	Force India-Mercedes	55	+1 Lap	13	
16	9	(Sweden) Marcus Ericsson	Sauber-Ferrari	55	+1 Lap	15	
17	20	(Denmark) Kevin Magnussen	Renault	55	+1 Lap	17	
18	94	(Germany) Pascal Wehrlein	MRT-Mercedes	55	+1 Lap	21	
19	8	(France) Romain Grosjean	Haas-Ferrari	55	+1 Lap	14	
20	12	(Brazil) Felipe Nasr	Sauber-Ferrari	55	+1 Lap	16	
21	88	(Indonesia) Rio Haryanto	MRT-Mercedes	55	+1 Lap	20	
22	30	(United Kingdom) Jolyon Palmer	Renault	55	+1 Lap	19	

== Championship standings after the race ==
Drivers' Championship standings

	Pos.	Driver	Points
	1	(Germany) Nico Rosberg	75
	2	(United Kingdom) Lewis Hamilton	39
	3	(Australia) Daniel Ricciardo	36
2	4	(Germany) Sebastian Vettel	33
1	5	(Finland) Kimi Räikkönen	28

Constructors' Championship standings

Pos.	Constructor	Points
1	(Germany) Mercedes	114
2	(Italy) Ferrari	61
3	(Austria) Red Bull Racing-TAG Heuer	57
4	(United Kingdom) Williams-Mercedes	29
5	(United States) Haas-Ferrari	18

- Note: Only the top five positions are included for both sets of standings.

Previous race: 2016 Bahrain Grand Prix	FIA Formula One World Championship; 2016 season	Next race: 2016 Russian Grand Prix
Previous race: 2015 Chinese Grand Prix	Chinese Grand Prix	Next race: 2017 Chinese Grand Prix
