= 2019 Chinese Grand Prix =

2019 Formula 1 race

Race 3 of 21 in the 2019 Formula One World Championship
← Previous race	Next race →
- Layout of the Shanghai International Circuit

Race details
- Date: 14 April 2019
- Official name: Formula 1 Heineken Chinese Grand Prix 2019
- Location: Shanghai International Circuit; Shanghai, China
- Course: Permanent racing facility
- Course length: 5.451 km (3.387 miles)
- Distance: 56 laps, 305.066 km (189.559 miles)
- Weather: Partly cloudy
- Attendance: 160,000

Pole position
Driver	(Finland) Valtteri Bottas	Mercedes
- Time: 1:31.547

Fastest lap
Driver	(France) Pierre Gasly	Red Bull Racing-Honda
- Time: 1:34.742 on lap 55

Podium
First	(United Kingdom) Lewis Hamilton	Mercedes
Second	(Finland) Valtteri Bottas	Mercedes
Third	(Germany) Sebastian Vettel	Ferrari

The 2019 Chinese Grand Prix (formally known as the Formula 1 Heineken Chinese Grand Prix 2019) was a Formula One motor race that took place on 14 April 2019 at the Shanghai International Circuit in Shanghai, China. The race was the 3rd round of the 2019 Formula One World Championship, and marked the 16th time that the Chinese Grand Prix had been run as a round of the Formula One World Championship. The race also marked the 1000th World Championship race since the first World Championship race was held at the Silverstone Circuit in 1950. This was also the last Chinese Grand Prix until 2024 as the 2020–2023 Grands Prix were not held due to the COVID-19 pandemic in the country.

== Background ==
=== Championship standings before the race ===
Heading into the race, Valtteri Bottas was leading the Drivers' Championship by one point from Lewis Hamilton. Bottas's team Mercedes was leading the Constructors' Championship by 39 points from Ferrari.

=== Entrants ===
The drivers and teams were the same as the season entry list with no additional stand in drivers for either the race or practice.

== Free practice ==
Sebastian Vettel was fastest in the first practice session with Valtteri Bottas fastest in the second practice. Bottas was again fastest in FP3 on Saturday, however the session was brought to a premature end when Alexander Albon lost control of his Toro Rosso and hit the wall on the exit of the final corner, smashing into the wall rear-first with an impact of 49g. He would not compete in qualifying due to the damage sustained from the accident and therefore started from the pitlane.

== Qualifying ==
The first qualifying session ended with no incidents with Valtteri Bottas setting the fastest lap of the session ahead of Charles Leclerc and teammate Lewis Hamilton. Qualifying ended with the elimination of Lance Stroll, George Russell, Robert Kubica, Antonio Giovinazzi and Alex Albon, the last two of whom failed to set a time in the session.

The second qualifying session ended without incident with Lewis Hamilton setting the fastest lap on the medium compound tyre. Valtteri Bottas, Sebastian Vettel, Charles Leclerc and Max Verstappen also set their laps on the medium compound tyre. Daniil Kvyat, Sergio Pérez, Kimi Räikkönen, Carlos Sainz Jr. and Lando Norris were eliminated from qualifying.

The third qualifying session ended without incident with most drivers having two chances to set a fastest lap. After the first runs, Valtteri Bottas was quickest with Lewis Hamilton and Sebastian Vettel rounding off the top 3. When setting up their second runs, Max Verstappen was overtaken at turn 14 by Sebastian Vettel and both Renault cars, this prevented him from crossing the line before the end of the session. Pierre Gasly and both Haas cars were also unable to start a lap before the session ended as a result. At the end of the session, Valtteri Bottas was on pole position 0.023 seconds ahead of Lewis Hamilton in second. Sebastian Vettel qualified third. The rest of the top ten consisted of, in qualifying order, Charles Leclerc, Max Verstappen, Pierre Gasly, Daniel Ricciardo, Nico Hülkenberg, Kevin Magnussen and Romain Grosjean.

=== Qualifying classification ===
Pos.	No.	Driver	Constructor	Qualifying times			Final grid
Pos.	No.	Driver	Constructor	Q1	Q2	Q3	Final grid
1	77	(Finland) Valtteri Bottas	Mercedes	1:32.658	1:31.728	1:31.547	1
2	44	(United Kingdom) Lewis Hamilton	Mercedes	1:33.115	1:31.637	1:31.570	2
3	5	(Germany) Sebastian Vettel	Ferrari	1:33.557	1:32.232	1:31.848	3
4	16	(Monaco) Charles Leclerc	Ferrari	1:32.712	1:32.324	1:31.865	4
5	33	(Netherlands) Max Verstappen	Red Bull Racing-Honda	1:33.274	1:32.369	1:32.089	5
6	10	(France) Pierre Gasly	Red Bull Racing-Honda	1:33.863	1:32.948	1:32.930	6
7	3	(Australia) Daniel Ricciardo	Renault	1:33.709	1:33.214	1:32.958	7
8	27	(Germany) Nico Hülkenberg	Renault	1:33.644	1:32.968	1:32.962	8
9	20	(Denmark) Kevin Magnussen	Haas-Ferrari	1:34.036	1:33.150	No time	9
10	8	(France) Romain Grosjean	Haas-Ferrari	1:33.752	1:33.156	No time	10
11	26	(Russia) Daniil Kvyat	Scuderia Toro Rosso-Honda	1:33.783	1:33.236	N/A	11
12	11	(Mexico) Sergio Pérez	Racing Point-BWT Mercedes	1:34.026	1:33.299	N/A	12
13	7	(Finland) Kimi Räikkönen	Alfa Romeo Racing-Ferrari	1:34.125	1:33.419	N/A	13
14	55	(Spain) Carlos Sainz Jr.	McLaren-Renault	1:33.686	1:33.523	N/A	14
15	4	(United Kingdom) Lando Norris	McLaren-Renault	1:34.148	1:33.967	N/A	15
16	18	(Canada) Lance Stroll	Racing Point-BWT Mercedes	1:34.292	N/A	N/A	16
17	63	(United Kingdom) George Russell	Williams-Mercedes	1:35.253	N/A	N/A	17
18	88	(Poland) Robert Kubica	Williams-Mercedes	1:35.281	N/A	N/A	18
107% time: 1:39.144
—	99	(Italy) Antonio Giovinazzi	Alfa Romeo Racing-Ferrari	No time	N/A	N/A	19^{1}
—	23	(Thailand) Alexander Albon	Scuderia Toro Rosso-Honda	No time	N/A	N/A	PL^{2}

Notes

- ^1 – Antonio Giovinazzi failed to set a time during qualifying and was permitted to race at the stewards' discretion.
- ^2 – Alexander Albon did not take part in qualifying after crashing in FP3 and was permitted to race at the stewards' discretion. He was required to start from the pit lane after changing his survival cell. He also received a five-place grid penalty for an unscheduled gearbox change.

== Race ==
Lewis Hamilton won the race ahead of his teammate Valtteri Bottas and Ferrari's Sebastian Vettel.

At the start of the race Bottas got a bad start allowing Hamilton to lead into the first corner. At the fourth corner Daniil Kvyat, Carlos Sainz Jr. and Lando Norris collided which would cause Norris and Kvyat to retire later in the race, despite Kvyat receiving a drive-through penalty as the stewards blamed him for the incident. On lap 11 Charles Leclerc was ordered by Ferrari to let his teammate Vettel past. Nico Hülkenberg retired on lap 17 with an MGU-K problem. Daniel Ricciardo managed to score his first points of the season and his first points for Renault. Pierre Gasly got the first fastest lap of his career. It was also Mercedes' third 1–2 finish of the season and the first time that a team has managed a 1–2 in the first three races of a season since Nigel Mansell and Riccardo Patrese did so for Williams in 1992.

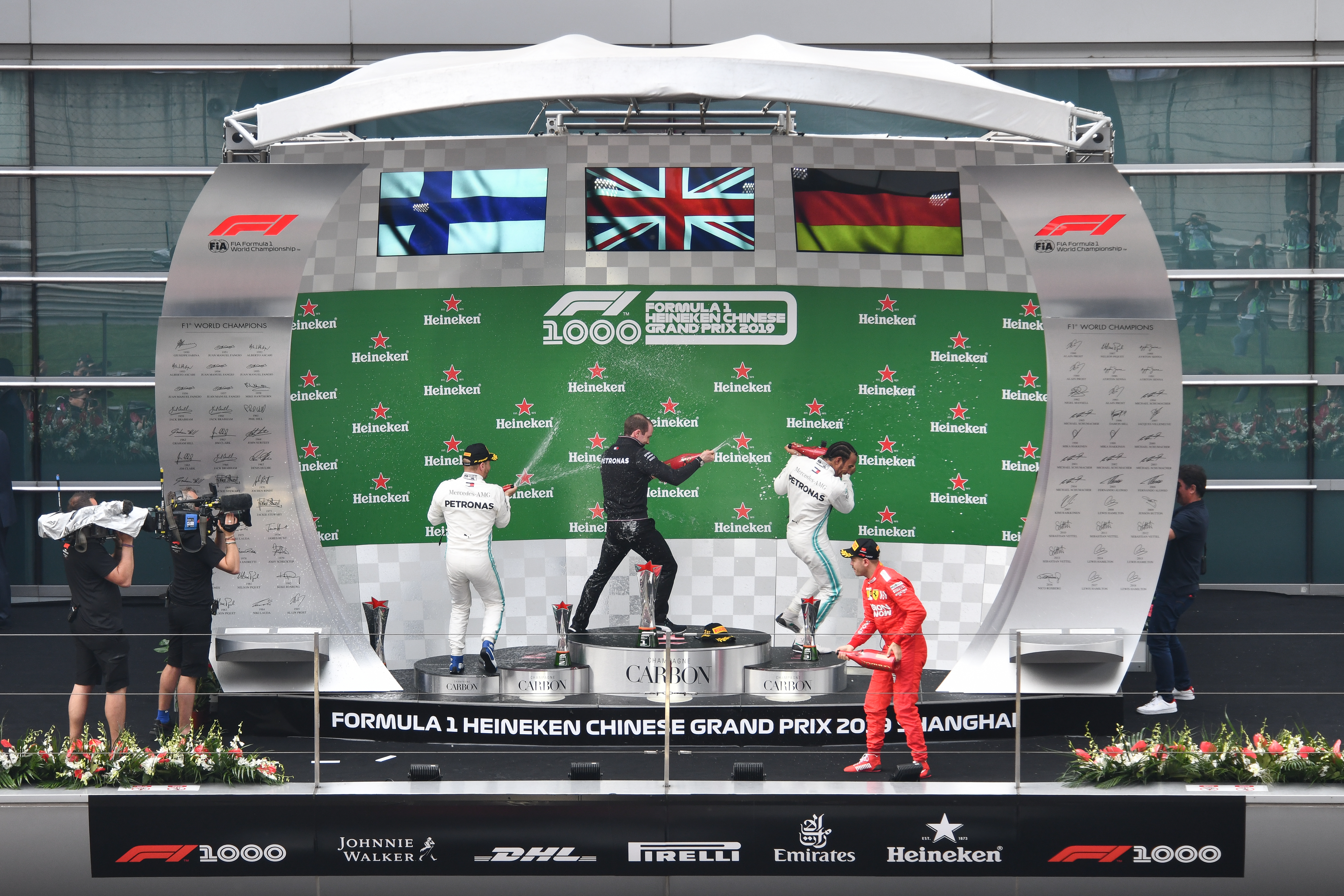
The podium celebration

=== Race classification ===
Pos.	No.	Driver	Constructor	Laps	Time/Retired	Grid	Points
1	44	(United Kingdom) Lewis Hamilton	Mercedes	56	1:32:06.350	2	25
2	77	(Finland) Valtteri Bottas	Mercedes	56	+6.552	1	18
3	5	(Germany) Sebastian Vettel	Ferrari	56	+13.744	3	15
4	33	(Netherlands) Max Verstappen	Red Bull Racing-Honda	56	+27.627	5	12
5	16	(Monaco) Charles Leclerc	Ferrari	56	+31.276	4	10
6	10	(France) Pierre Gasly	Red Bull Racing-Honda	56	+1:29.307	6	9^{1}
7	3	(Australia) Daniel Ricciardo	Renault	55	+1 lap	7	6
8	11	(Mexico) Sergio Pérez	Racing Point-BWT Mercedes	55	+1 lap	12	4
9	7	(Finland) Kimi Räikkönen	Alfa Romeo Racing-Ferrari	55	+1 lap	13	2
10	23	(Thailand) Alexander Albon	Scuderia Toro Rosso-Honda	55	+1 lap	PL	1
11	8	(France) Romain Grosjean	Haas-Ferrari	55	+1 lap	10	
12	18	(Canada) Lance Stroll	Racing Point-BWT Mercedes	55	+1 lap	16	
13	20	(Denmark) Kevin Magnussen	Haas-Ferrari	55	+1 lap	9	
14	55	(Spain) Carlos Sainz Jr.	McLaren-Renault	55	+1 lap	14	
15	99	(Italy) Antonio Giovinazzi	Alfa Romeo Racing-Ferrari	55	+1 lap	19	
16	63	(United Kingdom) George Russell	Williams-Mercedes	54	+2 laps	17	
17	88	(Poland) Robert Kubica	Williams-Mercedes	54	+2 laps	18	
18^{2}	4	(United Kingdom) Lando Norris	McLaren-Renault	50	Collision damage	15	
Ret	26	(Russia) Daniil Kvyat	Scuderia Toro Rosso-Honda	41	Collision damage	11	
Ret	27	(Germany) Nico Hülkenberg	Renault	16	Power unit	8	
Fastest lap: (France) Pierre Gasly (Red Bull Racing-Honda) – 1:34.742 (lap 55)

Notes

- ^1 – Includes one point for the fastest lap.
- ^2 – Lando Norris was classified as he completed more than 90% of the race distance.

== Championship standings after the race ==
Drivers' Championship standings

	Pos.	Driver	Points
1	1	(United Kingdom) Lewis Hamilton	68
1	2	(Finland) Valtteri Bottas	62
	3	(Netherlands) Max Verstappen	39
1	4	(Germany) Sebastian Vettel	37
1	5	(Monaco) Charles Leclerc	36

Constructors' Championship standings

	Pos.	Constructor	Points
	1	(Germany) Mercedes	130
	2	(Italy) Ferrari	73
	3	(Austria) Red Bull Racing-Honda	52
3	4	(France) Renault	12
1	5	(Switzerland) Alfa Romeo Racing-Ferrari	12

- Note: Only the top five positions are included for both sets of standings.

Previous race: 2019 Bahrain Grand Prix	FIA Formula One World Championship; 2019 season	Next race: 2019 Azerbaijan Grand Prix
Previous race: 2018 Chinese Grand Prix	Chinese Grand Prix	Next race: 2024 Chinese Grand Prix
