= 2014 Chinese Grand Prix =

Race 4 of 19 in the 2014 Formula One World Championship
← Previous race	Next race →
- Layout of the Shanghai International Circuit

Race details
- Date: 20 April 2014
- Official name: 2014 Formula 1 UBS Chinese Grand Prix
- Location: Shanghai International Circuit; Shanghai, People's Republic of China
- Course: Permanent racing facility
- Course length: 5.451 km (3.387 miles)
- Distance: 54 laps, 294.164 km (182.785 miles)
- Scheduled distance: 56 laps, 305.066 km (189.559 miles)
- Weather: Mostly cloudy, dry
- Attendance: 150,000

Pole position
Driver	(United Kingdom) Lewis Hamilton	Mercedes
- Time: 1:53.860

Fastest lap
Driver	(Germany) Nico Rosberg	Mercedes
- Time: 1:40.402 on lap 39

Podium
First	(United Kingdom) Lewis Hamilton	Mercedes
Second	(Germany) Nico Rosberg	Mercedes
Third	(Spain) Fernando Alonso	Ferrari

The 2014 Chinese Grand Prix (formally the 2014 Formula 1 UBS Chinese Grand Prix) was a Formula One motor race that was held on 20 April 2014 at the Shanghai International Circuit, Shanghai, China. The race was the fourth round of the 2014 Formula One season, and marked the eleventh time that the Chinese Grand Prix was held as a round for the Formula One World Championship.

Lewis Hamilton won the race comfortably after starting from pole position, leading from start to finish driving for the Mercedes team. Nico Rosberg finished second in the other Mercedes with Fernando Alonso third in a Ferrari. Although contested over 56 laps, the race result was declared after 54 laps, as the chequered flag was shown one lap early through a marshalling error. The leading positions were not affected by this error.

As a consequence of the race, Rosberg's lead in the Drivers' Championship was reduced to four points, with Alonso a further thirty-four behind. In the World Constructors Championship, Red Bull Racing passed Force India for second position, ninety-six points behind Mercedes.

== Report ==
=== Background ===
Heading into the fourth round of the season, Mercedes driver Nico Rosberg was leading the Drivers' Championship with 61 points; Rosberg's teammate Lewis Hamilton was second on 50 points, 11 points behind Rosberg. Behind Rosberg and Hamilton in the Drivers' Championship, Nico Hülkenberg was third on 28 points, with Fernando Alonso and Jenson Button on 26 and 23 points respectively. In the Constructors Championship, Mercedes were leading with 111 points and Force India were second on 44 points, with McLaren third on 43 points.

Prior to the race weekend, Stefano Domenicali resigned from position as Ferrari team principal citing the team's poor start to the season and their longest winless streak for 18 years. Domenicali was replaced by the President and CEO of Ferrari North America Marco Mattiacci.

Like the 2013 Chinese Grand Prix, tyre supplier Pirelli brought its white-banded medium compound tyre as the harder "prime" tyre and the yellow-banded soft compound tyre as the softer "option" tyre.

=== Practice and qualifying ===
Three practice sessions were held before the race; the first on Friday morning and the second on Friday afternoon. Both sessions lasted one and a half hours. The third session was held on Saturday morning and lasted an hour.

The qualifying session held on Saturday afternoon was split into three parts. The first part ran for 18 minutes and eliminated the cars from qualifying that finished the session 16th or lower. The second part of qualifying lasted 15 minutes and eliminated cars that finished in positions 11 to 16. The final part of qualifying determined the positions from first to tenth, and decided pole position.

Qualifying took place under wet conditions, with all drivers using either intermediate or full wet tyres. Hamilton clinched his third pole position for the season, with a time of 1:53.860. As a result, Hamilton became the British driver with the highest number of pole positions, surpassing Jim Clark's record of 33. He was joined on the front row of the grid by Ricciardo with Vettel qualifying third. Rosberg qualified fourth, 1.2 seconds behind Hamilton and Alonso qualified fifth. Massa, Bottas, Hulkenberg, Jean-Éric Vergne and Romain Grosjean rounded out the top ten. Räikkönen only managed 11th — missing out on the top ten for the second time in 2014 having struggled with the balance and handling of his car during the session. Jenson Button was the best placed McLaren in 12th, ahead of Daniil Kvyat, Adrian Sutil, Button's teammate Kevin Magnussen, with Sergio Pérez qualifying 16th. Esteban Gutiérrez was 17th, with the rest of the field consisting of the Caterham and Marussia cars. Lotus driver Pastor Maldonado did not take part in the qualifying sessions, but was allowed to start the race.

=== Race ===
The race, unlike qualifying, took place on a dry track. When the lights went out, Lewis Hamilton maintained the lead, followed by Sebastian Vettel, Fernando Alonso (who also had contact with Felipe Massa), Daniel Ricciardo and Massa himself. Further behind, the cars of Nico Rosberg and Valtteri Bottas touched, but both were able to continue the race.

On lap four, Rosberg began his comeback, passing Massa first, then, on lap 16, Ricciardo. Three laps later, Massa made his first tyre change: a problem with the rear wheels stopped him in the pits for a long time. On lap 12, Alonso also pitted, while Vettel completed another lap. The German, after his tyre change, found himself behind the Spaniard. Rosberg made his tyre change on lap 14; two laps later, it was Ricciardo's turn.

On lap 22, Rosberg gained another position, passing Vettel, for third place. The world champion suffered from problems with his Red Bull, so much so that he also gave way to Daniel Ricciardo, his teammate, on lap 25. The race still saw Lewis Hamilton in the lead, followed by Alonso, Rosberg, Ricciardo, Vettel, Nico Hülkenberg and Bottas.

Now closely followed by Rosberg, on lap thirty-four, Alonso went for his second tyre change: this allowed him, with fresh tyres, to widen the gap on the German Mercedes driver. Rosberg and Ricciardo went to change tyres again on lap 38. One lap later, the leader Hamilton also changed tyres. On lap 43, Rosberg overtook Alonso and moved into second place. In the final laps, Ricciardo got closer to Alonso, but was unable to worry him.

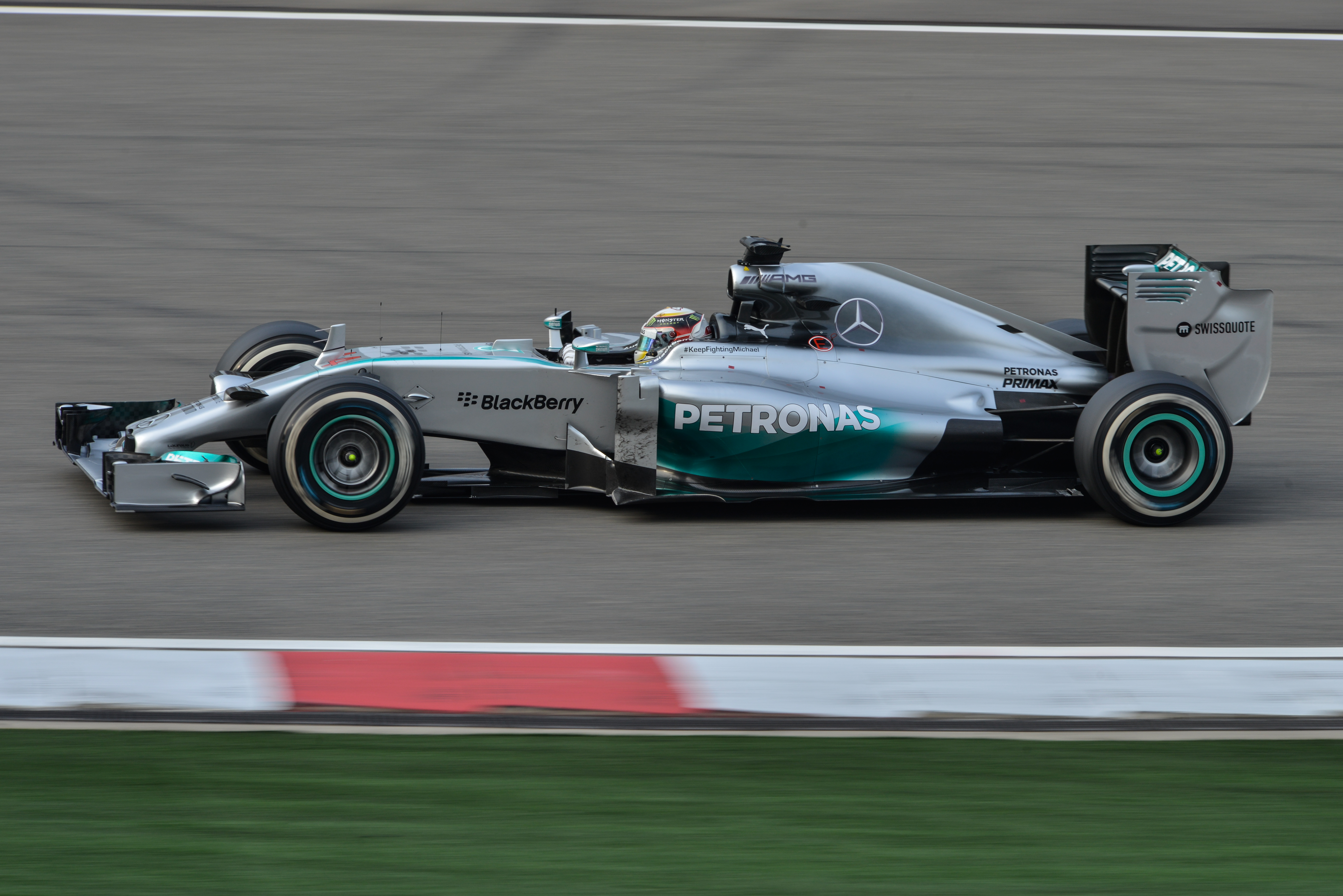
Hamilton took the victory and won three races in a row for the first time in his career.

The race was raced over 56 laps, however the chequered flag was shown to Lewis Hamilton at end of lap 55 by mistake. According to Article 43.2 of the FIA Sporting Regulations this meant that the race officially finished at the end of lap 54. This meant that Kamui Kobayashi's overtake of Jules Bianchi on the final lap did not stand.

Lewis Hamilton, for the first time in his F1 career, won three races in a row, ahead of Rosberg and Alonso. Hamilton, Rosberg and Alonso had not been on the podium together since the 2008 Singapore Grand Prix. For Mercedes, it was the hundredth consecutive Grand Prix in which they scored points as an engine designer.

=== Post-race ===
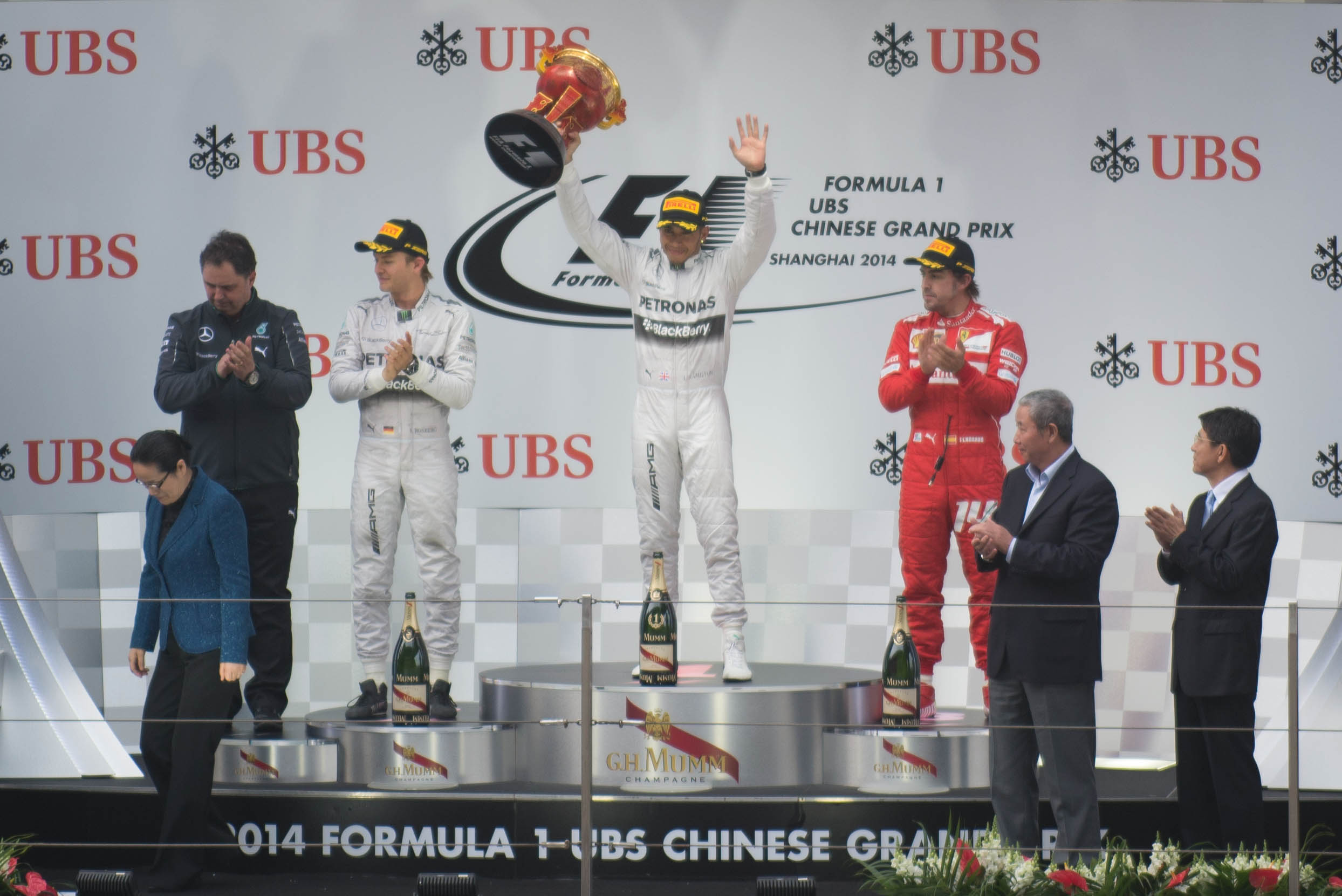
The podium ceremony after the race

As a consequence of the race, Hamilton reduced Rosberg's lead over him in the Drivers' Championship to four points. Alonso moved up to third position passing Hülkenberg with Vettel maintaining fifth place and Ricciardo moved from 10th to 6th. In the Constructors' Championship, Mercedes increased their lead, with Red Bull jumping ahead of Force India for second position and Ferrari moving to fourth, ahead of McLaren who fell from third to fifth position.

== Classification ==
=== Qualifying ===
Pos.	No.	Driver	Constructor	Q1	Q2	Q3	Grid
1	44	(United Kingdom) Lewis Hamilton	Mercedes	1:55.516	1:54.029	1:53.860	1
2	3	(Australia) Daniel Ricciardo	Red Bull Racing-Renault	1:56.641	1:55.302	1:54.455	2
3	1	(Germany) Sebastian Vettel	Red Bull Racing-Renault	1:55.926	1:54.499	1:54.960	3
4	6	(Germany) Nico Rosberg	Mercedes	1:56.058	1:55.294	1:55.143	4
5	14	(Spain) Fernando Alonso	Ferrari	1:56.961	1:55.765	1:55.637	5
6	19	(Brazil) Felipe Massa	Williams-Mercedes	1:56.850	1:56.757	1:56.147	6
7	77	(Finland) Valtteri Bottas	Williams-Mercedes	1:56.501	1:56.253	1:56.282	7
8	27	(Germany) Nico Hülkenberg	Force India-Mercedes	1:55.913	1:56.847	1:56.366	8
9	25	(France) Jean-Éric Vergne	Toro Rosso-Renault	1:57.477	1:56.584	1:56.773	9
10	8	(France) Romain Grosjean	Lotus-Renault	1:58.411	1:56.407	1:57.079	10
11	7	(Finland) Kimi Räikkönen	Ferrari	1:58.279	1:56.860		11
12	22	(United Kingdom) Jenson Button	McLaren-Mercedes	1:57.783	1:56.963		12
13	26	(Russia) Daniil Kvyat	Toro Rosso-Renault	1:57.261	1:57.289		13
14	99	(Germany) Adrian Sutil	Sauber-Ferrari	1:58.138	1:57.393		14
15	20	(Denmark) Kevin Magnussen	McLaren-Mercedes	1:57.369	1:57.675		15
16	11	(Mexico) Sergio Pérez	Force India-Mercedes	1:58.362	1:58.264		16
17	21	(Mexico) Esteban Gutiérrez	Sauber-Ferrari	1:58.988			17
18	10	(Japan) Kamui Kobayashi	Caterham-Renault	1:59.260			18
19	17	(France) Jules Bianchi	Marussia-Ferrari	1:59.326			19
20	9	(Sweden) Marcus Ericsson	Caterham-Renault	2:00.646			20
21	4	(United Kingdom) Max Chilton	Marussia-Ferrari	2:00.865			21
107% time: 2:03.602
NC^{1}	13	(Venezuela) Pastor Maldonado	Lotus-Renault	No time^{1}			22

Notes

- ^1 — Pastor Maldonado failed to set a lap time within 107% of the fastest lap time set by Lewis Hamilton in Q1. He was later given permission to start by race stewards. Maldonado was also penalised five places on the starting grid for the accident he caused in the previous Grand Prix.

=== Race ===
Pos.	No.	Driver	Constructor	Laps	Time/Retired	Grid	Points
1	44	(United Kingdom) Lewis Hamilton	Mercedes	54	1:33:28.338	1	25
2	6	(Germany) Nico Rosberg	Mercedes	54	+18.062	4	18
3	14	(Spain) Fernando Alonso	Ferrari	54	+23.604	5	15
4	3	(Australia) Daniel Ricciardo	Red Bull Racing-Renault	54	+27.136	2	12
5	1	(Germany) Sebastian Vettel	Red Bull Racing-Renault	54	+47.778	3	10
6	27	(Germany) Nico Hülkenberg	Force India-Mercedes	54	+54.295	8	8
7	77	(Finland) Valtteri Bottas	Williams-Mercedes	54	+55.697	7	6
8	7	(Finland) Kimi Räikkönen	Ferrari	54	+1:16.335	11	4
9	11	(Mexico) Sergio Pérez	Force India-Mercedes	54	+1:22.647	16	2
10	26	(Russia) Daniil Kvyat	Toro Rosso-Renault	53	+1 Lap	13	1
11	22	(United Kingdom) Jenson Button	McLaren-Mercedes	53	+1 Lap	12	
12	25	(France) Jean-Éric Vergne	Toro Rosso-Renault	53	+1 Lap	9	
13	20	(Denmark) Kevin Magnussen	McLaren-Mercedes	53	+1 Lap	15	
14	13	(Venezuela) Pastor Maldonado	Lotus-Renault	53	+1 Lap	22	
15	19	(Brazil) Felipe Massa	Williams-Mercedes	53	+1 Lap	6	
16	21	(Mexico) Esteban Gutiérrez	Sauber-Ferrari	53	+1 Lap	17	
17	17	(France) Jules Bianchi	Marussia-Ferrari	53	+1 Lap	19	
18	10	(Japan) Kamui Kobayashi	Caterham-Renault	53	+1 Lap	18	
19	4	(United Kingdom) Max Chilton	Marussia-Ferrari	52	+2 Laps	21	
20	9	(Sweden) Marcus Ericsson	Caterham-Renault	52	+2 Laps	20	
Ret	8	(France) Romain Grosjean	Lotus-Renault	28	Gearbox	10	
Ret	99	(Germany) Adrian Sutil	Sauber-Ferrari	5	Engine	14	

== Championship standings after the race ==
Drivers' Championship standings

	Pos.	Driver	Points
	1	(Germany) Nico Rosberg	79
	2	(United Kingdom) Lewis Hamilton	75
1	3	(Spain) Fernando Alonso	41
1	4	(Germany) Nico Hülkenberg	36
1	5	(Germany) Sebastian Vettel	33

Constructors' Championship standings

	Pos.	Constructor	Points
	1	(Germany) Mercedes	154
2	2	(Austria) Red Bull Racing-Renault	57
1	3	Force India-Mercedes	54
1	4	(Italy) Ferrari	52
2	5	(United Kingdom) McLaren-Mercedes	43

- Note: Only the top five positions are included for both sets of standings.

Previous race: 2014 Bahrain Grand Prix	FIA Formula One World Championship; 2014 season	Next race: 2014 Spanish Grand Prix
Previous race: 2013 Chinese Grand Prix	Chinese Grand Prix	Next race: 2015 Chinese Grand Prix
