= 2015 Chinese Grand Prix =

Race 3 of 19 in the 2015 Formula One World Championship
← Previous race	Next race →

Race details
- Date: 12 April 2015
- Official name: 2015 Formula 1 Chinese Grand Prix
- Location: Shanghai International Circuit, Shanghai, China
- Course: Permanent Racing Facility
- Course length: 5.451 km (3.387 miles)
- Distance: 56 laps, 305.066 km (189.559 miles)
- Weather: Sunny; 21 °C (70 °F) air temperature 46 °C (115 °F) track temperature 1.4 m/s (4.6 ft/s) wind from the northwest
- Attendance: 145,000 (Weekend) 125,000 (Race Day)

Pole position
Driver	(United Kingdom) Lewis Hamilton	Mercedes
- Time: 1:35.782

Fastest lap
Driver	(United Kingdom) Lewis Hamilton	Mercedes
- Time: 1:42.208 on lap 31

Podium
First	(United Kingdom) Lewis Hamilton	Mercedes
Second	(Germany) Nico Rosberg	Mercedes
Third	(Germany) Sebastian Vettel	Ferrari

The 2015 Chinese Grand Prix (formally known as the 2015 Formula 1 Chinese Grand Prix) was a Formula One motor race that was held on 12 April 2015 at the Shanghai International Circuit in Shanghai, China. The race was the third round of the 2015 Formula One World Championship, and marked the twelfth time that the Chinese Grand Prix has been run as a round of the Formula One World Championship.

Lewis Hamilton was the defending race winner and went into the weekend with a three-point lead in the World Drivers' Championship over Sebastian Vettel, who had surprised the field by taking victory in the previous round at Malaysia. Hamilton took pole position during Saturday's qualifying, the 41st of his career and the third in a row. He went on to win the race from his teammate Nico Rosberg.

== Report ==
=== Background ===
After Sebastian Vettel's surprise victory two weeks prior in Malaysia, eyes were on Ferrari whether they would be able to continue their good race pace in China and challenge the Mercedes for the win. As lower track temperatures were expected for the race, a serious competitiveness of Ferrari was cast into doubt, as they had benefited from lower tyre degradation in the heat of Malaysia. All ten teams taking part in the 2015 Formula One World Championship participated in the race, with Marussia hoping to finally be able to run both cars continually, after Will Stevens had failed to start in Malaysia.

As in 2014, Pirelli announced they would be supplying teams with the white-banded medium compound tyre as the prime selection and the yellow-banded soft compound as the option selection for the event.

=== Free practice ===
Per the regulations for the 2015 season, three practice sessions were held, two 1.5-hour sessions on Friday and another one-hour session before qualifying on Saturday. World champion Lewis Hamilton took a clean sweep and topped the time sheets in all three sessions by a considerable margin. The first session saw Lotus test driver Jolyon Palmer participate in place of regular Romain Grosjean. He finished six-tenths of a second behind his teammate Pastor Maldonado and was one of several drivers to have off track experiences during the session. Both Mercedes drivers ran wide on different parts of the track, as did Felipe Massa, who spun his Williams in turn 14 towards the end of the session. Hamilton was over half a second clear of his teammate Nico Rosberg on Friday morning, with the Ferraris more than a second behind.

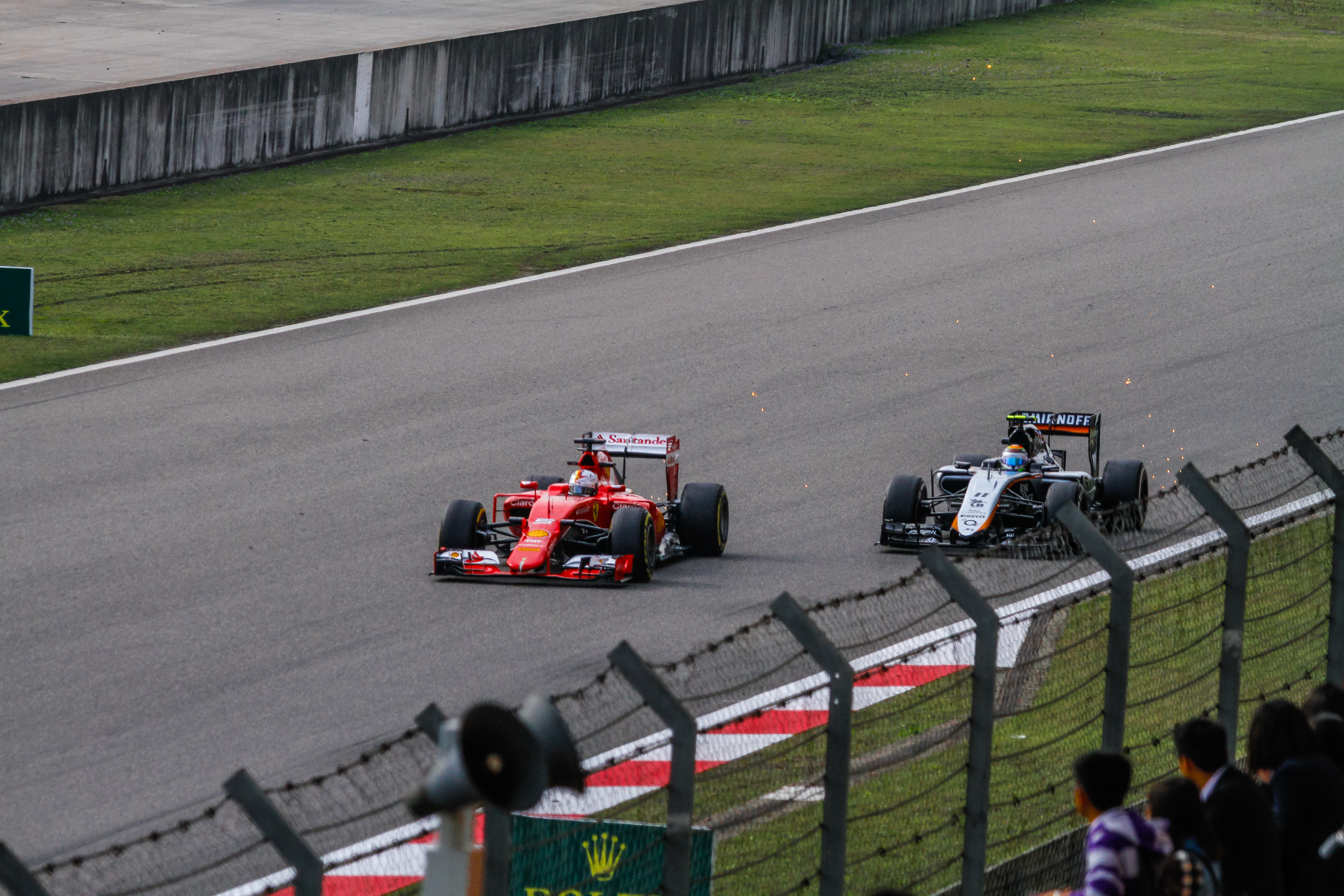
Sparks caused by titanium plates underneath the cars returned to Formula One in the 2015 season.

Hamilton continued his strong performance during the second session on Friday afternoon, beating Malaysia winner Sebastian Vettel for the top spot, Vettel finishing almost half a second down. Most teams ran with both dry tyre compounds. Mercedes appeared more dominant on the harder tyres, one second ahead of the rest of the grid. Red Bull continued to struggle with the same brake problems they had endured in Malaysia two weeks before. The left rear brake of Daniil Kvyat started to smoke after a pit stop, leading the team to investigate the matter further. Felipe Massa spun yet again in turn 14, hitting the barrier with his front wing meaning the session was red-flagged for a while. The session was further disrupted by the appearance of a local man running across the main straight, jumping into pit lane before being stopped by security after entering the Ferrari garage, where he apparently stated he wanted to "try a car".

Hamilton was once again fastest during third practice on Saturday morning, even while suffering from overheating under his seat. The two Mercedes cars were separated by two-tenths of a second with the two Ferraris of Vettel and Kimi Räikkönen behind, another half a second down. Red Bull had a slight upturn in fortune, with Daniel Ricciardo and Daniil Kvyat finishing fifth and sixth respectively. McLaren-Honda had another problematic session as Fernando Alonso stopped the car just after starting his installation lap. Teammate Jenson Button was called into the pit lane as well, citing a similar problem with the engine, but was able to continue later in the session. Felipe Massa experienced smoke in his cockpit both on Friday and Saturday, apparently caused by the new titanium plates underneath the cars which also create sparks when driving over bumps on the track.

=== Qualifying ===
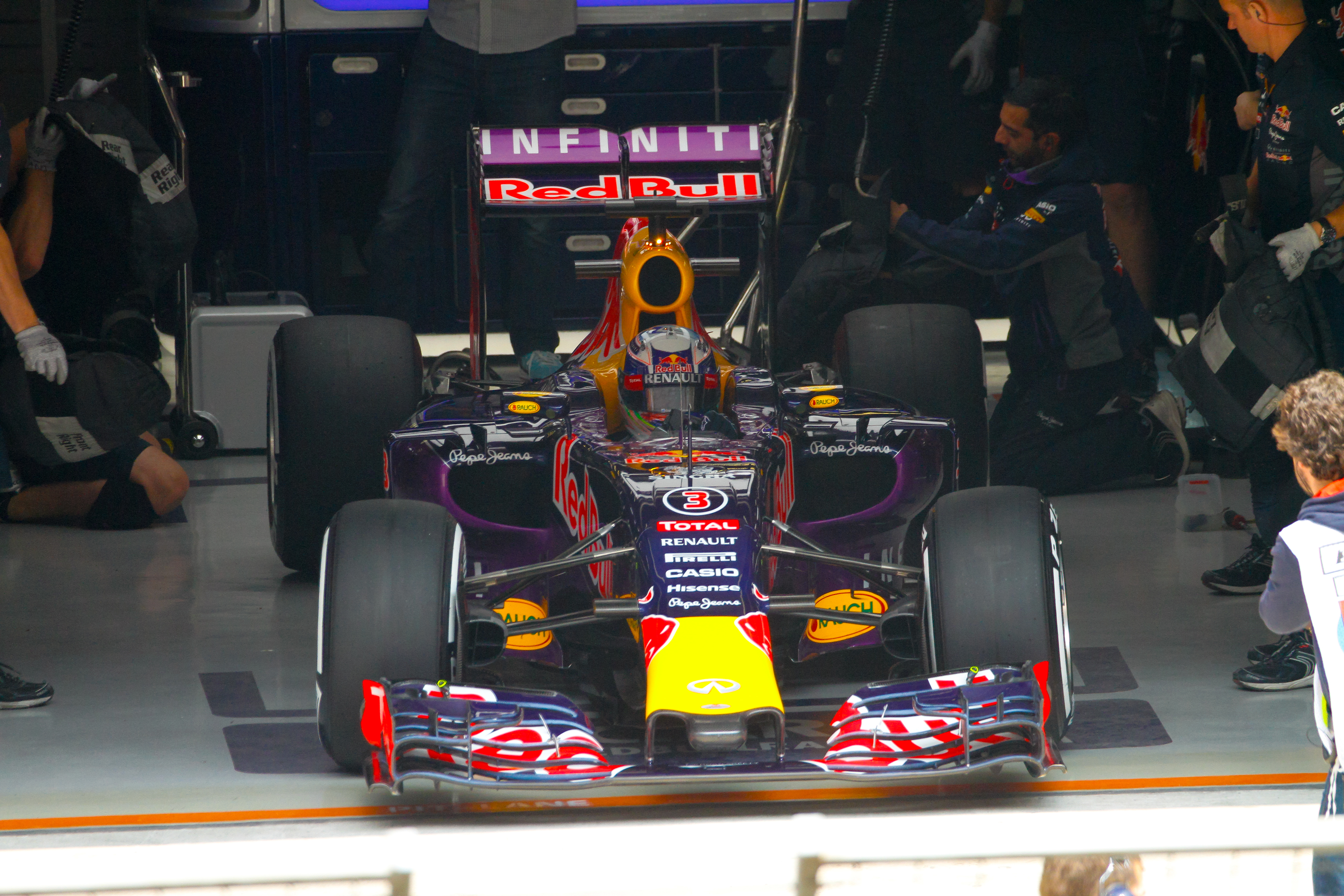
Daniel Ricciardo out-qualified teammate Daniil Kvyat for the third successive race, and qualified seventh.

Qualifying consisted of three parts, 18, 15 and 12 minutes in length respectively, with five drivers eliminated from competing after each of the first two sessions. In the session, which started at 15:00 local time (UTC +8) on Saturday afternoon, Lewis Hamilton took the third out of three possible pole positions of the season, narrowly beating his teammate by 0.04 seconds. Nico Rosberg was frustrated about the result, lamenting that his team had put unnecessary pressure on him by telling him to go faster during his last warm-up lap, saying "[w]e need to look at that as that was not ideal to put me under pressure like that".

Mercedes were the only team to use the medium tyre in the first qualifying session (Q1), with all other teams using the faster soft tyre. Five drivers were eliminated in Q1, four of them being the two Marussia and McLaren cars, all of which had yet failed to go through to Q2. They were joined by the Force India of Nico Hülkenberg, who was to start 16th on the grid.

The second session saw Hamilton post the fastest time, even though his car lost contact to pit lane and his seat overheating once more. He was three-tenths clear of his teammate Rosberg, with Sebastian Vettel in third. Daniil Kvyat suffered engine problems and failed to make it into Q3, as did the second Force India of Sergio Pérez, both Toro Rosso drivers and the Lotus of Pastor Maldonado.

During Q3, contested by the top ten, Hamilton just beat his teammate to pole position, with a time set during his first timed lap. Both Ferrari drivers ran their first lap on used tyres in order to save one set for the race. In their second outing, Vettel was able to get ahead of the two Williams cars of Felipe Massa and Valtteri Bottas, while teammate Kimi Räikkönen struggled with the handling of his car in the first part of the track to finish sixth on the grid.

=== Race ===
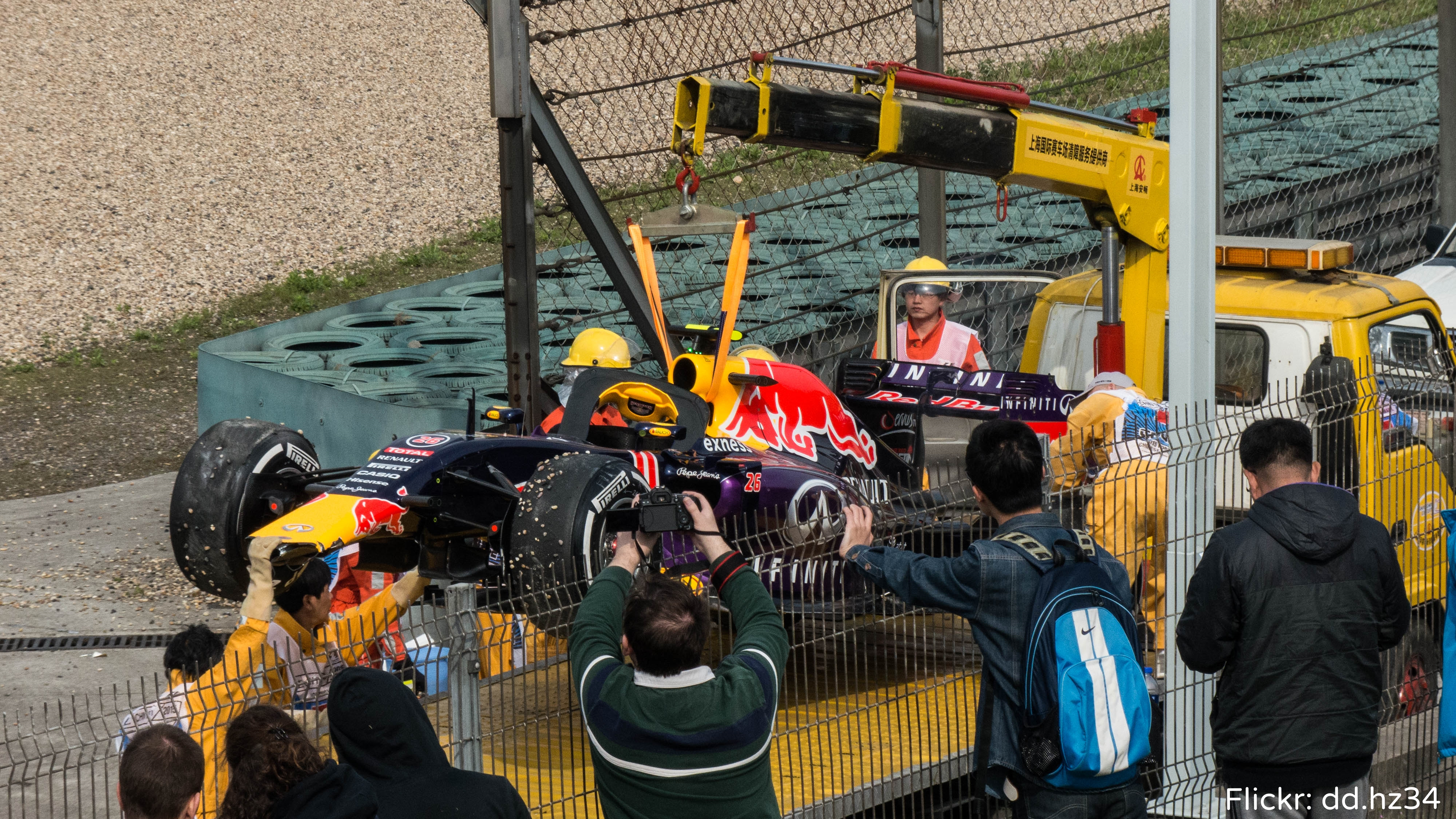
Daniil Kvyat retired from the race on lap 17.

When the race started at 14:00 local time (UTC +8), Kimi Räikkönen managed to pass both Williams cars on the first lap to move up to fourth, while Nico Rosberg was able to fend off Sebastian Vettel for second. On the second lap, Carlos Sainz Jr. spun his Toro Rosso and dropped down the order. Nico Hülkenberg became the first retirement on lap ten, when he parked his Force India in the gravel after his gearbox failed. During the pit stops, Ferrari attempted an undercut by pitting Sebastian Vettel early on lap 13, a strategy in which a car running behind is pitting early in order to use a fast out-lap on fresh tyres to jump ahead of a rival without having to overtake them on track. However this was unsuccessful as Mercedes reacted by pitting Rosberg the following lap, allowing Rosberg to maintain track position over Vettel. On lap 17, Daniil Kvyat retired from the race when his Red Bull started to smoke due to an engine failure.

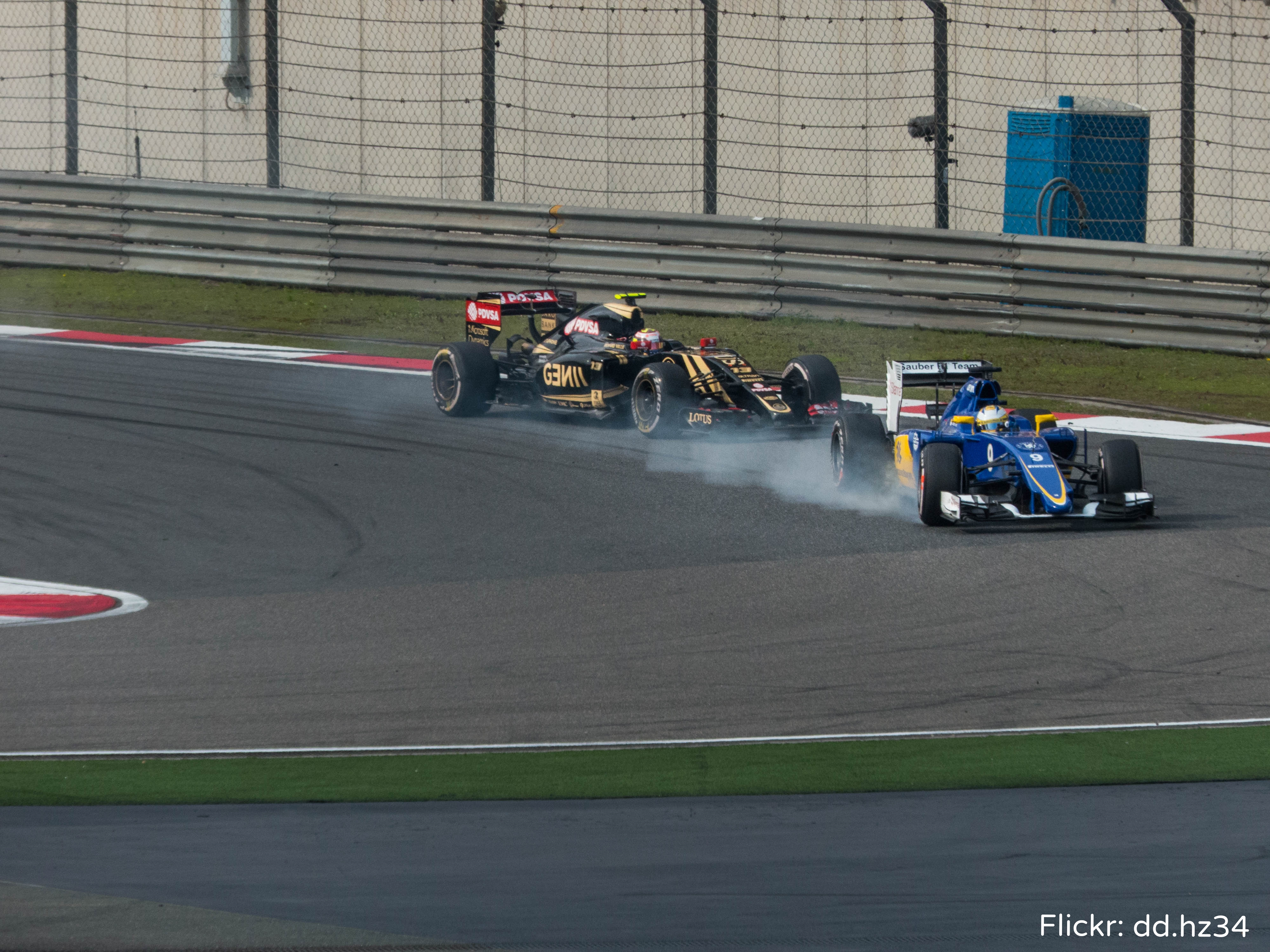
Marcus Ericsson locks up under braking for turn 14.

After the first pit stops, the Mercedes drivers had to manage their tyres in order to cover from a possible attack by Ferrari, who had an extra set of fresh tyres saved from qualifying. Rosberg however complained over the radio about Hamilton in front of him driving too slow, which caused him to back into the charging Ferraris. He was unable to risk driving too close behind Hamilton, because dispersed air from the back of the car was accelerating tyre degradation. Hamilton was therefore asked by the team to pick up the pace.

The top three began to spread out in the second half of the race, and by lap 54 Lewis Hamilton was leading Rosberg by 10.06 seconds, with Vettel a further 12.12 seconds behind Rosberg. However, due to Ferrari's earlier attempt to undercut Rosberg by pitting Vettel early, Räikkönen's tyres were 4 laps fresher than his teammate's, and he closed in on Vettel over the final stint. Having emerged from his final pit stop 4.84 seconds behind Vettel on lap 35, Räikkönen had closed the gap to 1.37 seconds by lap 54. However, the chance of a battle between the Ferrari teammates was extinguished after a transmission failure on Max Verstappen's Toro Rosso, who was stranded on the start/finish-straight, brought out the safety car for the final two laps, meaning that the race ended under safety car conditions.

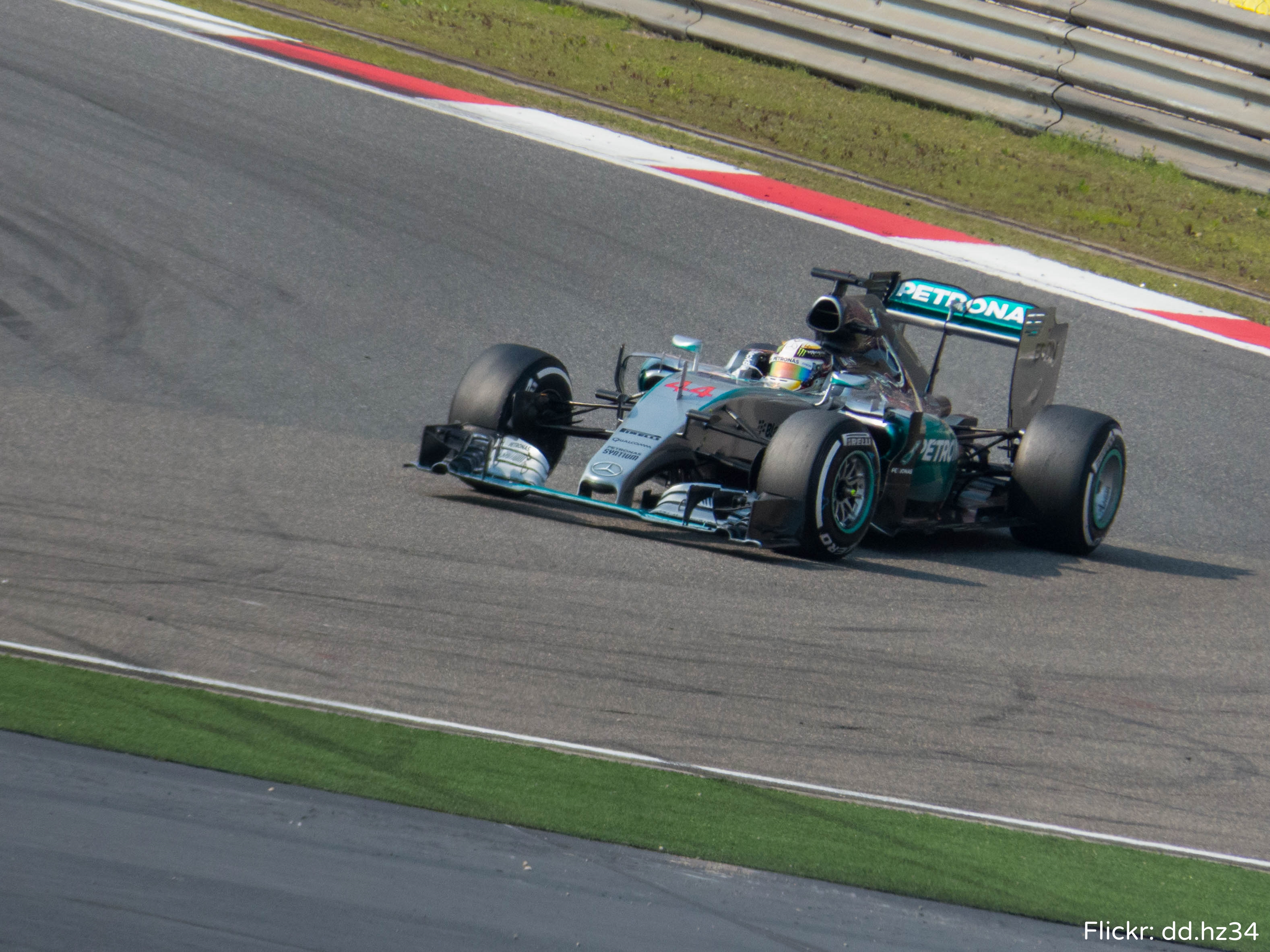
Lewis Hamilton on the last lap of the race

Hamilton crossed the line to win his second race of the season, with Rosberg following him home in second and Vettel completing the podium with third place. Pastor Maldonado had an eventful race. On lap 33, while running in seventh position ahead of teammate Romain Grosjean, he missed the pit entry and lost time, dropping several positions. He then proceeded to spin his car on lap 39 as he attempted to make up for lost time, and on lap 48 he had a collision with Jenson Button following a long battle for position, damaging his car and retiring with rear brake failure a few laps later. The stewards later deemed Button to be at fault for the incident.

=== Post-race ===
At the podium interviews, conducted by two-time Olympic 400 metres hurdles champion Edwin Moses, race winner Lewis Hamilton acknowledged "a fantastic job by the team" and expressed disappointment over the late safety car, calling it "kind of an anti-climax when you have a good race like that". During the press conference after the race, Nico Rosberg accused his teammate of deliberately slowing down during the middle stint of the race and compromising his race in the process. Hamilton declared, when asked about the radio message telling him to speed up, that he "wasn't controlling his [Nico's] race, I was controlling my own race". Rosberg reacted to that statement by saying: "It's just now interesting to hear from you, Lewis, that you were just thinking about yourself with the pace in front, and necessarily that was compromising my race." Hamilton was subsequently backed up by Mercedes non-executive chairman Niki Lauda, who said: "Sure, everyone drives selfish. [...] What do you think these guys are here to do? I call them egocentric bastards. That is the only way to win and the only way to win the Championship, they are all the same."

== Classification ==
=== Qualifying ===
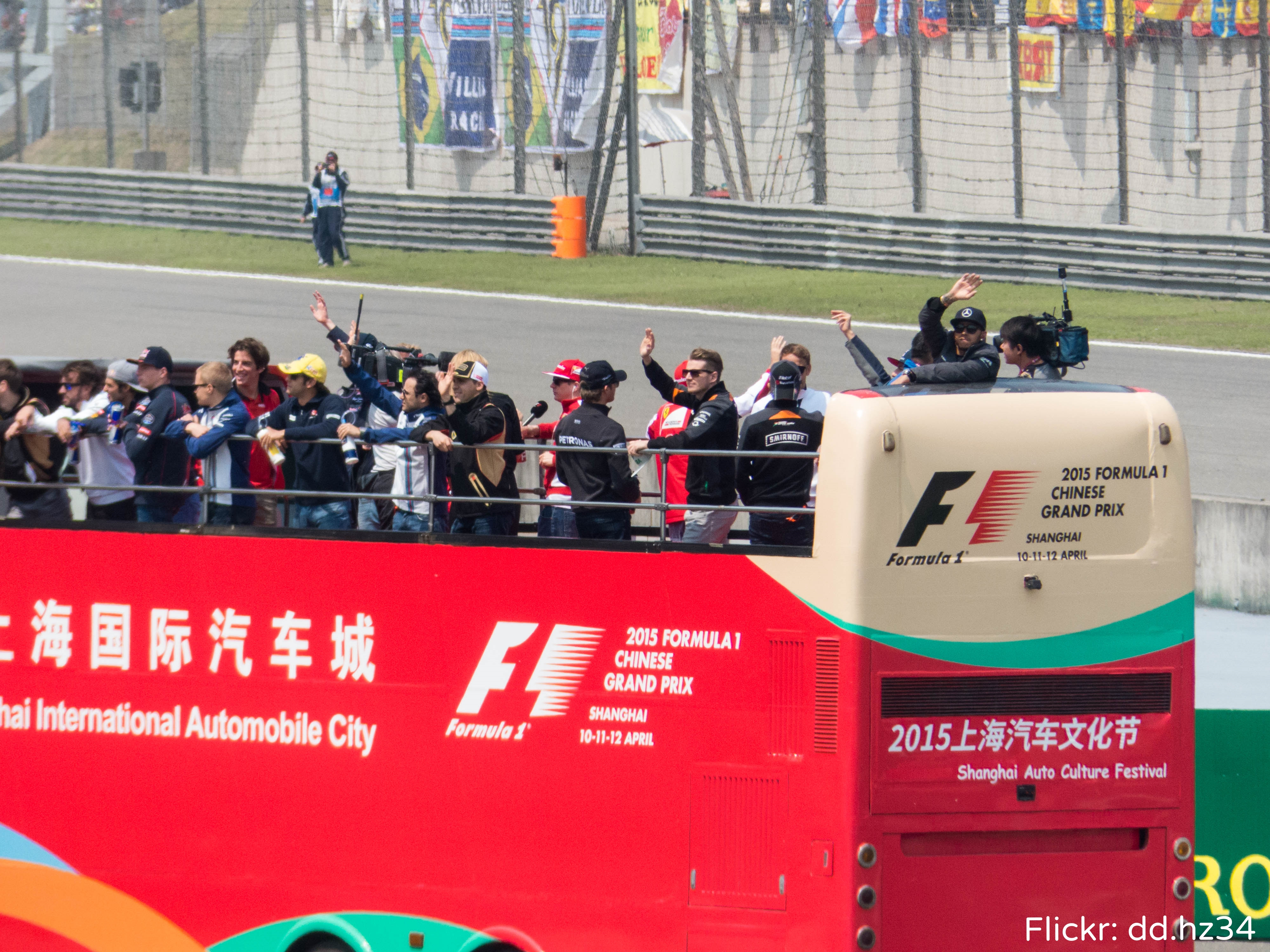
The drivers went around the track for the drivers' parade shortly before the race.

Pos.	Car no.	Driver	Constructor	Qualifying times			Final grid
Pos.	Car no.	Driver	Constructor	Q1	Q2	Q3	Final grid
1	44	(United Kingdom) Lewis Hamilton	Mercedes	1:38.285	1:36.423	1:35.782	1
2	6	(Germany) Nico Rosberg	Mercedes	1:38.496	1:36.747	1:35.824	2
3	5	(Germany) Sebastian Vettel	Ferrari	1:37.502	1:36.957	1:36.687	3
4	19	(Brazil) Felipe Massa	Williams-Mercedes	1:38.433	1:37.357	1:36.954	4
5	77	(Finland) Valtteri Bottas	Williams-Mercedes	1:38.014	1:37.763	1:37.143	5
6	7	(Finland) Kimi Räikkönen	Ferrari	1:37.790	1:37.109	1:37.232	6
7	3	(Australia) Daniel Ricciardo	Red Bull Racing-Renault	1:38.534	1:37.939	1:37.540	7
8	8	(France) Romain Grosjean	Lotus-Mercedes	1:38.209	1:38.063	1:37.905	8
9	12	(Brazil) Felipe Nasr	Sauber-Ferrari	1:38.521	1:38.017	1:38.067	9
10	9	(Sweden) Marcus Ericsson	Sauber-Ferrari	1:38.941	1:38.127	1:38.158	10
11	13	(Venezuela) Pastor Maldonado	Lotus-Mercedes	1:38.563	1:38.134		11
12	26	(Russia) Daniil Kvyat	Red Bull Racing-Renault	1:39.051	1:38.209		12
13	33	(Netherlands) Max Verstappen	Toro Rosso-Renault	1:38.387	1:38.393		13
14	55	(Spain) Carlos Sainz Jr.	Toro Rosso-Renault	1:38.622	1:38.538		14
15	11	(Mexico) Sergio Pérez	Force India-Mercedes	1:38.903	1:39.290		15
16	27	(Germany) Nico Hülkenberg	Force India-Mercedes	1:39.216			16
17	22	(United Kingdom) Jenson Button	McLaren-Honda	1:39.276			17
18	14	(Spain) Fernando Alonso	McLaren-Honda	1:39.280			18
19	28	(United Kingdom) Will Stevens	Marussia-Ferrari	1:42.091			19
20	98	(Spain) Roberto Merhi	Marussia-Ferrari	1:42.842			20
107% time: 1:44.327

=== Race ===
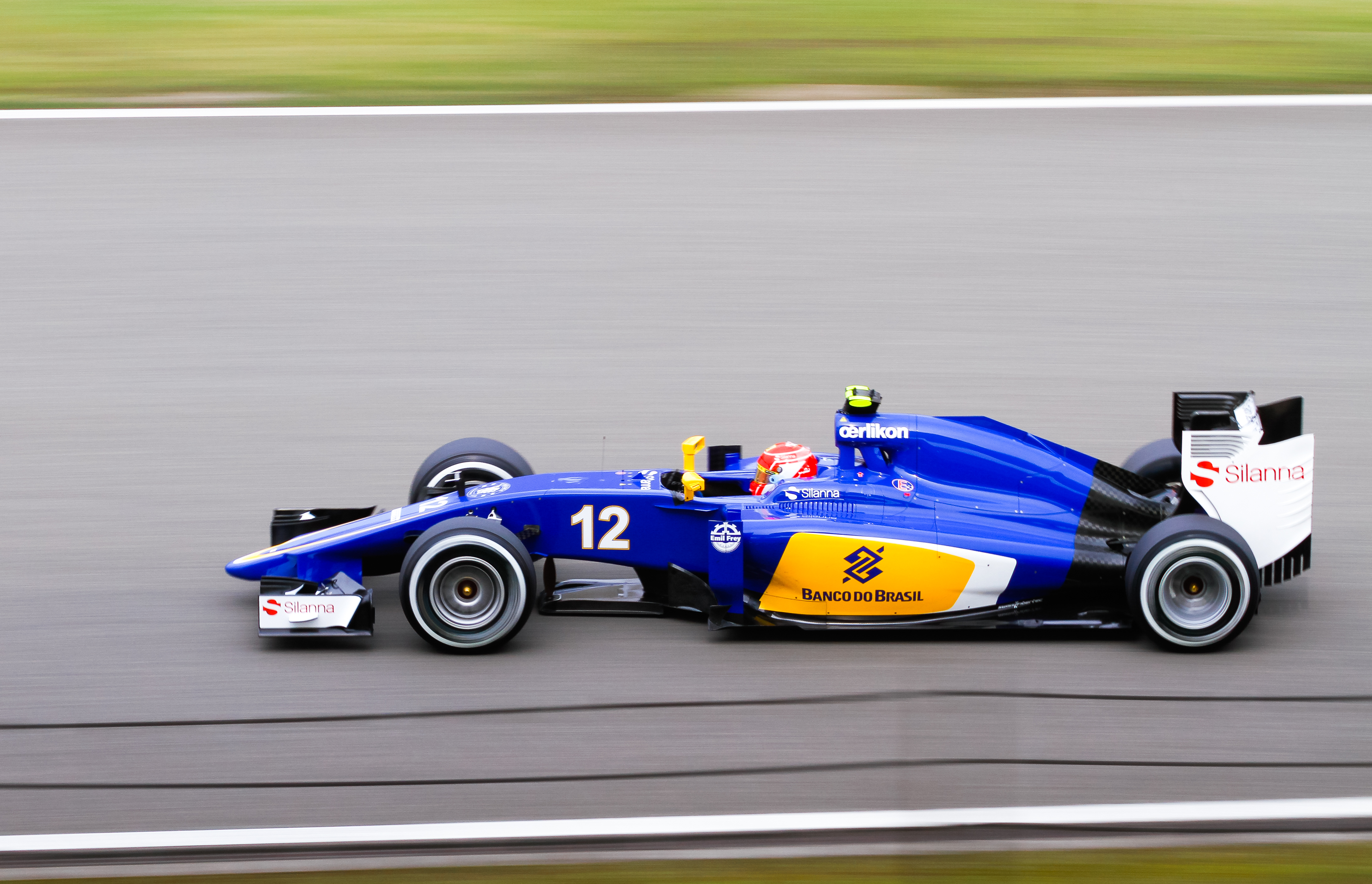
Felipe Nasr took his second points-scoring finish of the season, finishing eighth.

Pos.	No.	Driver	Constructor	Laps	Time/Retired	Grid	Points
1	44	(United Kingdom) Lewis Hamilton	Mercedes	56	1:39:42.008	1	25
2	6	(Germany) Nico Rosberg	Mercedes	56	+0.714	2	18
3	5	(Germany) Sebastian Vettel	Ferrari	56	+2.988	3	15
4	7	(Finland) Kimi Räikkönen	Ferrari	56	+3.835	6	12
5	19	(Brazil) Felipe Massa	Williams-Mercedes	56	+8.544	4	10
6	77	(Finland) Valtteri Bottas	Williams-Mercedes	56	+9.885	5	8
7	8	(France) Romain Grosjean	Lotus-Mercedes	56	+19.008	8	6
8	12	(Brazil) Felipe Nasr	Sauber-Ferrari	56	+22.625	9	4
9	3	(Australia) Daniel Ricciardo	Red Bull Racing-Renault	56	+32.117	7	2
10	9	(Sweden) Marcus Ericsson	Sauber-Ferrari	55	+1 Lap	10	1
11	11	(Mexico) Sergio Pérez	Force India-Mercedes	55	+1 Lap	15	
12	14	(Spain) Fernando Alonso	McLaren-Honda	55	+1 Lap	18	
13	55	(Spain) Carlos Sainz Jr.	Toro Rosso-Renault	55	+1 Lap	14	
14^{1}	22	(United Kingdom) Jenson Button	McLaren-Honda	55	+1 Lap	17	
15	28	(United Kingdom) Will Stevens	Marussia-Ferrari	54	+2 Laps	19	
16^{2}	98	(Spain) Roberto Merhi	Marussia-Ferrari	54	+2 Laps	20	
17^{3}	33	(Netherlands) Max Verstappen	Toro Rosso-Renault	52	Drivetrain	13	
Ret	13	(Venezuela) Pastor Maldonado	Lotus-Mercedes	49	Brakes	11	
Ret	26	(Russia) Daniil Kvyat	Red Bull Racing-Renault	15	Engine	12	
Ret	27	(Germany) Nico Hülkenberg	Force India-Mercedes	9	Gearbox	16	

Notes

- ^1 – Jenson Button originally finished thirteenth, but received a five-second post-race time penalty for causing a collision with Pastor Maldonado.
- ^2 – Roberto Merhi received a five-second post-race time penalty for failing to stay above the required lap time under the safety car.
- ^3 – Max Verstappen was classified as he had completed over 90% of the race distance.

== Championship standings after the race ==
Drivers' Championship standings

+/–	Pos.	Driver	Points
	1	(United Kingdom) Lewis Hamilton	68
	2	(Germany) Sebastian Vettel	55
	3	(Germany) Nico Rosberg	51
	4	(Brazil) Felipe Massa	30
	5	(Finland) Kimi Räikkönen	24

Constructors' Championship standings

+/–	Pos.	Constructor	Points
	1	(Germany) Mercedes	119
	2	(Italy) Ferrari	79
	3	(United Kingdom) Williams-Mercedes	48
	4	(Switzerland) Sauber-Ferrari	19
1	5	(Austria) Red Bull Racing-Renault	13

- Note: Only the top five positions are included for both sets of standings.

== See also ==
- 2015 TCR International Series Shanghai round

Previous race: 2015 Malaysian Grand Prix	FIA Formula One World Championship; 2015 season	Next race: 2015 Bahrain Grand Prix
Previous race: 2014 Chinese Grand Prix	Chinese Grand Prix	Next race: 2016 Chinese Grand Prix
