= 2010 Turkish Grand Prix =

Race 7 of 19 in the 2010 Formula One World Championship
← Previous race	Next race →

Race details
- Date: 30 May 2010
- Official name: 2010 Formula 1 Turkish Grand Prix
- Location: Istanbul Park, Tuzla, Turkey
- Course: Permanent racing facility
- Course length: 5.338 km (3.317 miles)
- Distance: 58 laps, 309.396 km (192.250 (Note: There was a offset of 0.208 km (0.129 mi) between the start and finish lines.) miles)
- Weather: Air: 28 to 29 °C (82 to 84 °F) Track: 39 to 49 °C (102 to 120 °F)
- Attendance: 35,000

Pole position
Driver	(Australia) Mark Webber	Red Bull-Renault
- Time: 1:26.295

Fastest lap
Driver	(Russia) Vitaly Petrov	Renault
- Time: 1:29.165 on lap 57

Podium
First	(United Kingdom) Lewis Hamilton	McLaren-Mercedes
Second	(United Kingdom) Jenson Button	McLaren-Mercedes
Third	(Australia) Mark Webber	Red Bull-Renault

The 2010 Turkish Grand Prix (formally the 2010 Formula 1 Turkish Grand Prix) was a Formula One motor race held on 30 May 2010 at the Istanbul Park, Tuzla, Turkey. It was the seventh round of the 2010 Formula One World Championship and the sixth Turkish Grand Prix. McLaren driver Lewis Hamilton won the 58-lap race starting from second position. His teammate Jenson Button finished second, and Red Bull driver Mark Webber took third. Hamilton's victory made him the fifth different driver in seven races to win a Grand Prix in 2010.

Before the race, Webber led the World Drivers' Championship jointly with his Red Bull teammate Sebastian Vettel while Red Bull led the World Constructors' Championship. Webber qualified on pole position with the fastest lap time in the third qualifying session and maintained his lead at the start of the race with Hamilton in second who fended off a challenge from Vettel. The order was maintained until the first sequence of pit stops when Hamilton lost second place after his crew had trouble with fitting one of his tyres correctly. Webber conserved fuel on lap 40 which allowed Vettel to challenge him for the lead but the two collided. Vettel retired and the crash promoted Hamilton and Button to first and second. Hamilton and Button were instructed to conserve fuel for the remainder of the race but the latter had not been given a target lap time and attempted to overtake Hamilton on lap 48 although the former retained the lead which he held for the remaining ten laps to win his first race of the season.

The result extended Webber's advantage over second place in the World Drivers' Championship, now occupied by Button, by five championship points. Hamilton's victory elevated him to third, while Alonso dropped from third to fourth. Vettel's retirement demoted him from second to fifth. McLaren's one–two finish promoted them to the lead in the World Constructors' Championship by one championship point over Red Bull. Ferrari fell from second to third after a poor result, with 12 races left of the season.

== Background ==
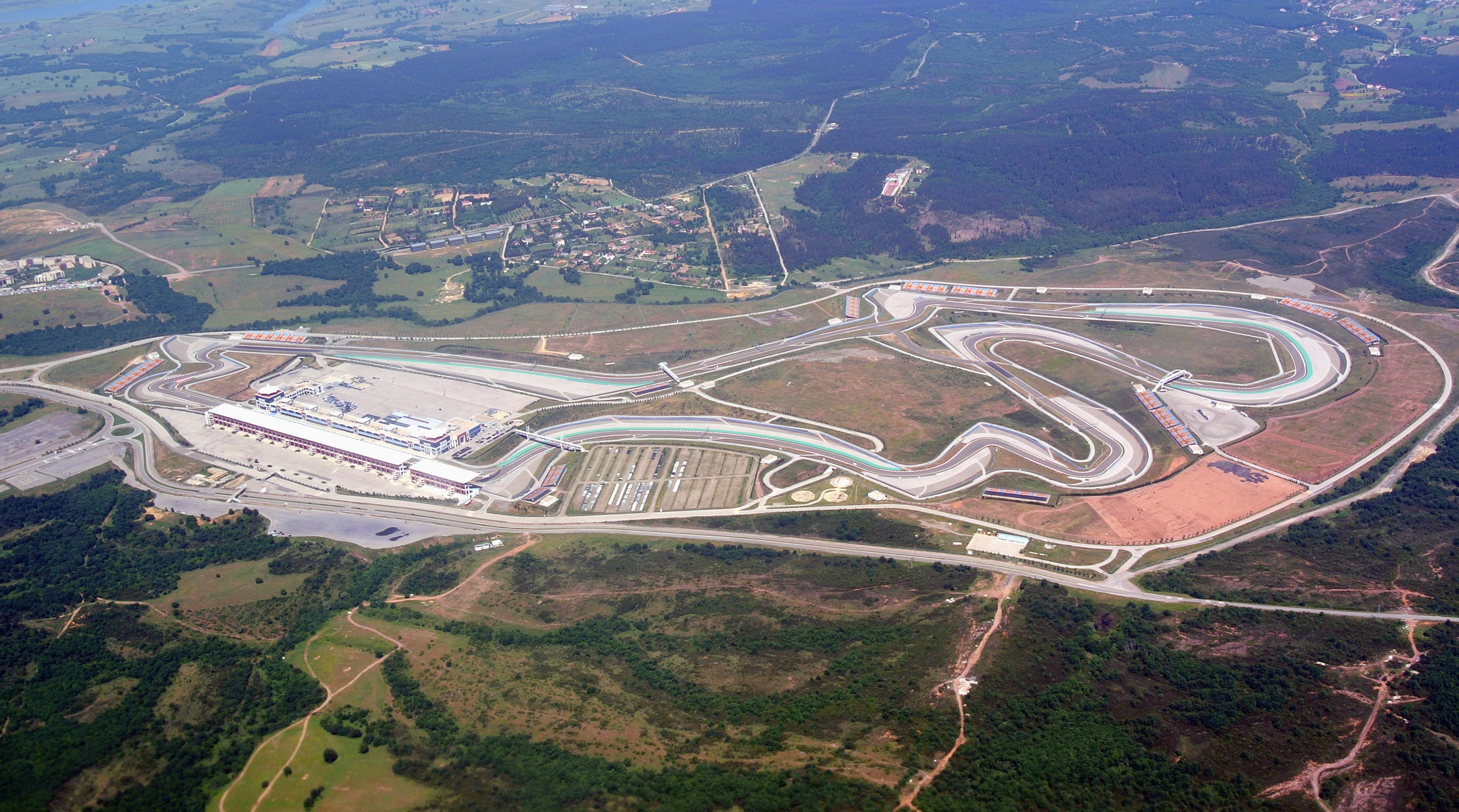
Istanbul Park, where the race was held.

The 2010 Turkish Grand Prix was the seventh scheduled round of the 2010 Formula One World Championship after taking a two-week break from the previous race of the season in Monaco. It was held on 30 May 2010 at the Istanbul Park circuit in Tuzla, near Istanbul, Turkey. The Grand Prix was contested by 12 teams with two drivers each. The teams (also known as constructors) were Red Bull, Mercedes, McLaren, Ferrari, Renault, Williams, Force India, Sauber, Toro Rosso, Lotus, Hispania and Virgin. Tyre supplier Bridgestone brought four different tyre types to the race: two dry compounds (soft "options" and hard "primes") and two wet-weather compounds (intermediate and full wet).

Before the race Red Bull drivers Mark Webber and Sebastian Vettel were tied for the lead of the World Drivers' Championship with 78 championship points each, with Ferrari driver Fernando Alonso in third with 75 championship points. Jenson Button was fourth with 70 championship points and Felipe Massa was fifth with 61 championship points. Red Bull led the Constructors' Championship with 156 championship points, Ferrari and McLaren were second and third with 136 and 129 championship points respectively, while Mercedes (78) and Renault (65) contended for fourth place.

Webber had won the previous two rounds in Spain and Monaco and achieved pole position in both events. Despite the form, Webber said Red Bull were still wary of their rivals, saying that they had a good foundation and position but no person knew who would be challenging for the title late in the season, but did not feel it would between two people. Ferrari came into the event with a long series of success at the track, having won three of the last five races held at Istanbul Park. The team identified the event as their 800th Grand Prix and their cars carried a logo celebrating the achievement on their engine covers. Alonso was upbeat about their chances in the race, saying that compared to the Spanish Grand Prix, he felt their situation was a little better due to the fact Istanbul Park's characteristics are different and did not require the maximum amount of aerodynamic downforce, but a lower level which was suited to the F10. Alonso also believed it would be a "surprise" if the Red Bull team finished behind him. Hamilton claimed that McLaren would be competitive in Turkey and hoped that he would secure his first victory of the season.

Several teams made modifications to their cars in preparation for the event. Red Bull introduced a revised version of its RB6 chassis for Vettel as his previous monocoque had a small defect which created handling difficulties in Monaco. The team tested a version of McLaren's F-duct system (which increases the top speed of a car) during the Friday practice sessions but removed it for qualifying and the race because both of McLaren's drivers found the device difficult to operate. Ferrari modified their F-duct system so that it would allow their drivers to operate the system by using their left leg. Mercedes arrived at the circuit by reverting to a previous specification of suspension and introduced a longer wheelbase on both their cars as well as a new version of their F-duct system. Williams decided to revert to an old specification of their front wing following accidents involving their drivers in Monaco, though the team brought new brake ducts. Lotus débuted a new rear wing specification which improved forward balance of their chassis. Virgin managed to procure a longer-wheelbase version of the VR-01 for Lucas di Grassi after the 2010 eruptions of Eyjafjallajökull delayed work to the car because many of the team's staff were stranded in Shanghai for a week following the Chinese Grand Prix.

== Practice ==
There were three practice sessions preceding Sunday's race—two 90-minute sessions on Friday, and one 60-minute session on Saturday. The Friday morning session was held on a dusty track scattered with debris and several drivers spun off the track. Lewis Hamilton set the first session's fastest time, at 1:28.653; his late lap was almost one second quicker than teammate Button. The two Mercedes drivers were third and fourth quickest; Michael Schumacher ahead of Nico Rosberg. Vettel and Webber set the fifth and eighth fastest times respectively for Red Bull; they were separated by the Renault duo of Robert Kubica and Vitaly Petrov. Alonso and Adrian Sutil rounded out the top ten. The session was disrupted with two minutes to go when Sutil ran wide at turn eight, which caused him to spin backwards and crash into a barrier, breaking his front wing and both front tyres. The session was ended early due to limited time running.

In the second practice session that afternoon, Button set the quickest lap of the day, a 1:28.280, which was nearly one tenth of a second quicker than Webber. Vettel was third fastest followed by Hamilton and Alonso in fourth and fifth. Both Mercedes cars were slower in the session with Rosberg sixth and Schumacher seventh. Kubica, Petrov and Massa followed in the top ten. Webber stopped outside the exit of turn two with an engine failure and engaged in an argument with marshals on preventing the car from moving backwards. In the final practice session, Vettel was fastest with a time of 1:27.086, three tenths of a second faster than the second-placed Rosberg. Hamilton was third and spun sideways into the turn eight gravel trap. He was ahead of Webber who had a throttle problem. Kubica, Alonso, Schumacher, Button, Massa and Petrov completed the top ten ahead of qualifying.

== Qualifying ==
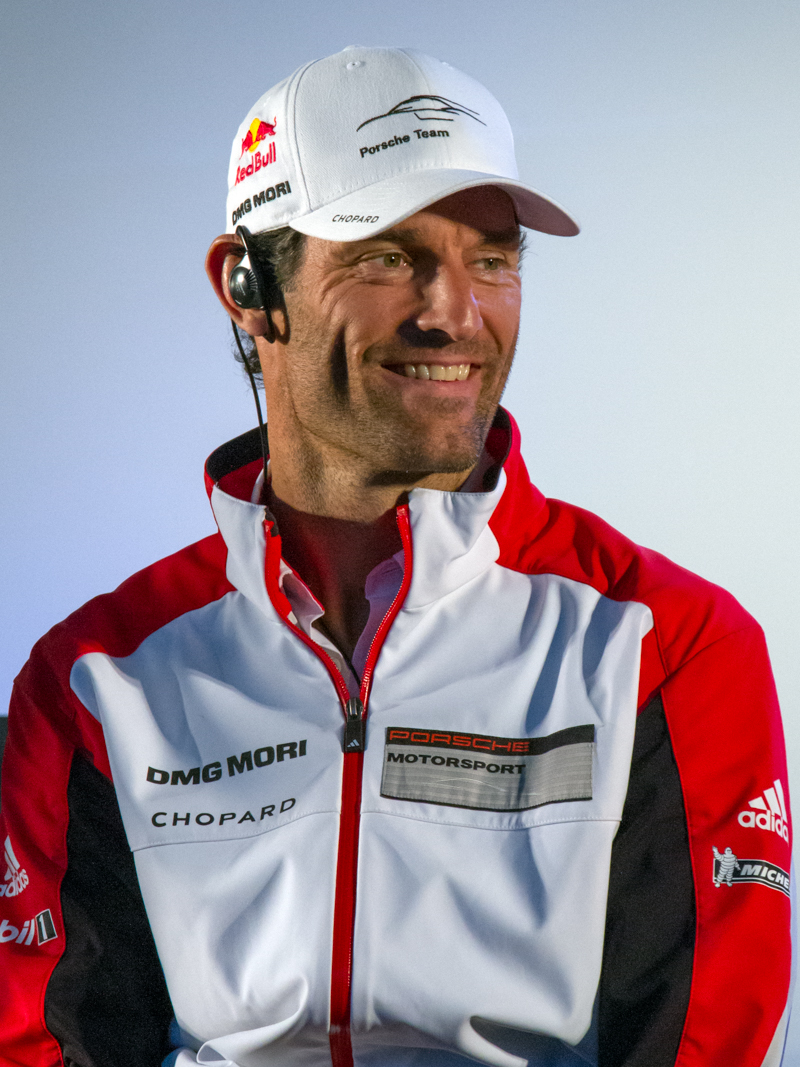
Mark Webber (pictured in 2014) had his third consecutive pole position of the season.

The qualifying session held on Saturday afternoon was split into three parts. The first part ran for 20 minutes and eliminated the cars that finished the session 18th or lower. The second session lasted 15 minutes and eliminated cars that finished in positions 11 to 17. The final session ran for 10 minutes and determined pole position to tenth. Cars which competed in the final session of qualifying were not allowed to change tyres before the race, and as such started the race on the tyres that they set their quickest lap on. The session was held in dry weather conditions. Webber set the fastest time in the final session, and took his third successive pole position with a lap of 1:26.295. He was joined on the grid's front row by Hamilton, who recorded a lap time 0.148 seconds slower. Vettel set the fastest times in the first two sessions, though mistakes on his first two runs due to a roll-bar failure in the final session prevented him from recording a faster lap. He dropped to third overall in the final session. A car setup error caused Button to run too low to the ground through turn eight and was restricted to fourth. Schumacher qualified in fifth and was happy with his starting position despite spinning at turn eight on his final qualifying lap. Rosberg qualified sixth and despite wanting to start higher up the field, he was confident about his race chances. Kubica had problems when running the soft compound tyre, managing seventh, but was happy with his lap in the final session.

He was ahead of Massa, the faster Ferrari driver. Petrov secured ninth in the slower Renault car. Kobayashi rounded out the top ten fastest qualifiers. Sutil was the fastest driver not to advance into the final session in 11th; his best time of 1:27.525 was eight tenths of a second slower than Vettel's pace in the second session. Alonso recorded the 12th fastest time and could not secure a position in the final session as his car touched a white line under braking on the circuit, causing his car to slide. Nevertheless, Alonso thought that the error did not cost him time. He was followed by Pedro de la Rosa in the other Sauber car in 13th, who in turn, was ahead of Sébastien Buemi for Toro Rosso and Williams driver Rubens Barrichello. This formation continued on the eighth row of the grid, which was occupied by Jaime Alguersuari in the second Toro Rosso and Nico Hülkenberg in the other Williams. Vitantonio Liuzzi failed to progress beyond the first session; the Force India driver qualified in 18th. The Lotus cars of Heikki Kovalainen and Jarno Trulli lined up in 19th and 20th respectively. Timo Glock and Bruno Senna lined up in 21st and 22nd, respectively, with their teammates Di Grassi and Karun Chandhok qualifying at the rear of the field.

=== Qualifying classification ===
The fastest lap in each of the three sessions is denoted in bold.

Pos	No.	Driver	Constructor	Q1	Q2	Q3	Grid
1	6	(Australia) Mark Webber	Red Bull-Renault	1:27.500	1:26.818	**1:26.295**	1
2	2	(United Kingdom) Lewis Hamilton	McLaren-Mercedes	1:27.667	1:27.013	1:26.433	2
3	5	(Germany) Sebastian Vettel	Red Bull-Renault	**1:27.067**	**1:26.729**	1:26.760	3
4	1	(United Kingdom) Jenson Button	McLaren-Mercedes	1:27.555	1:27.277	1:26.781	4
5	3	(Germany) Michael Schumacher	Mercedes	1:27.756	1:27.438	1:26.857	5
6	4	(Germany) Nico Rosberg	Mercedes	1:27.649	1:27.141	1:26.952	6
7	11	(Poland) Robert Kubica	Renault	1:27.766	1:27.426	1:27.039	7
8	7	(Brazil) Felipe Massa	Ferrari	1:27.993	1:27.200	1:27.082	8
9	12	(Russia) Vitaly Petrov	Renault	1:27.620	1:27.387	1:27.430	9
10	23	(Japan) Kamui Kobayashi	BMW Sauber-Ferrari	1:28.158	1:27.434	1:28.122	10
11	14	(Germany) Adrian Sutil	Force India-Mercedes	1:27.951	1:27.525	N/A	11
12	8	(Spain) Fernando Alonso	Ferrari	1:27.857	1:27.612	N/A	12
13	22	(Spain) Pedro de la Rosa	BMW Sauber-Ferrari	1:28.147	1:27.879	N/A	13
14	16	(Switzerland) Sébastien Buemi	Toro Rosso-Ferrari	1:28.534	1:28.273	N/A	14
15	9	(Brazil) Rubens Barrichello	Williams-Cosworth	1:28.336	1:28.392	N/A	15
16	17	(Spain) Jaime Alguersuari	Toro Rosso-Ferrari	1:28.460	1:28.540	N/A	16
17	10	(Germany) Nico Hülkenberg	Williams-Cosworth	1:28.227	1:28.841	N/A	17
18	15	(Italy) Vitantonio Liuzzi	Force India-Mercedes	1:28.958	N/A	N/A	18
19	18	(Italy) Jarno Trulli	Lotus-Cosworth	1:30.237	N/A	N/A	19
20	19	(Finland) Heikki Kovalainen	Lotus-Cosworth	1:30.519	N/A	N/A	20
21	24	(Germany) Timo Glock	Virgin-Cosworth	1:30.744	N/A	N/A	21
22	21	(Brazil) Bruno Senna	HRT-Cosworth	1:31.266	N/A	N/A	22
23	25	(Brazil) Lucas di Grassi	Virgin-Cosworth	1:31.989	N/A	N/A	PL^{1}
24	20	(India) Karun Chandhok	HRT-Cosworth	1:32.060	N/A	N/A	24

Notes

- **^1** — Lucas di Grassi started from the pit lane after an issue with his engine's oil system was discovered.

== Race ==
The race commenced at 15:00 Eastern European Summer Time (UTC+3). The conditions on the grid were warm and sunny before the race; there was an air temperature between 28 and 29 °C (82 and 84 °F) with a track temperature ranging between 39 and 49 °C (102 and 120 °F). Di Grassi changed his engine and began from the pit lane because his team rectified an issue with his engine oil system which was discovered one hour beforehand. As the five red lights went out to signal the start of the race, Webber maintained his pole position advantage heading into the first corner. Hamilton had wheelspin when he moved out of his starting position and abandoned the use of his second clutch. Vettel made a brisk start to pass Hamilton for second around the inside of turn one but Hamilton reclaimed the position by passing Vettel around the outside at the third corner. Schumacher also made a fast getaway and overtook Button for fourth place but the latter retook the position at turn 12 after slipstreaming in Schumacher's tow on the back straight. De la Rosa ran wide at turn two allowing Buemi to pass him heading into the third turn. However, Buemi went wide allowing Hülkenberg to take advantage of Buemi's error. Buemi attempted to re-pass Hülkenberg around the inside at turn seven but Hülkenberg made contact with Buemi, puncturing the right rear tyre of Buemi's car which forced both drivers to make early pit stops. At the end of the first lap, Webber led Hamilton by 0.4 seconds, who in turn was followed by Vettel, Button, Schumacher, Rosberg, Kubica, Massa, Petrov and Sutil.

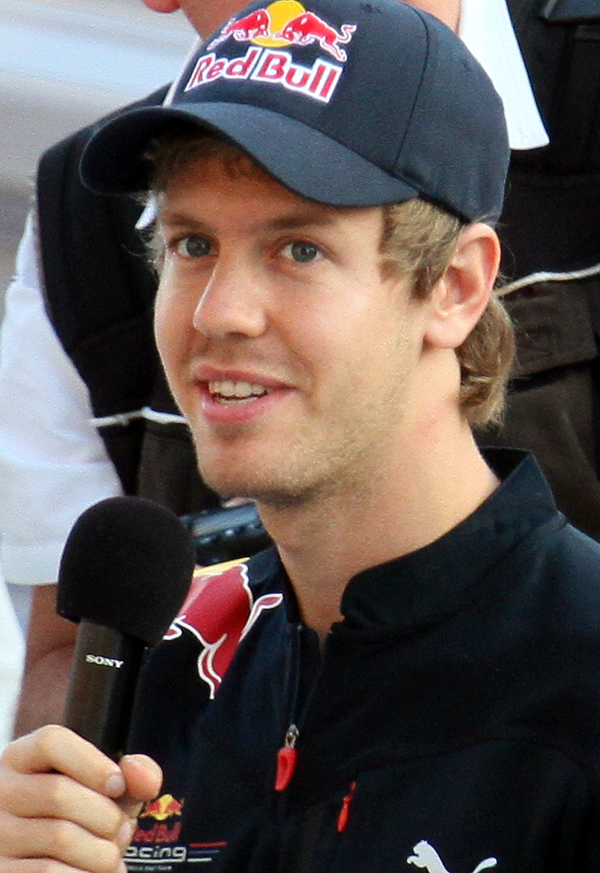
Sebastian Vettel collided with teammate Webber on the race's 40th lap.

The first four drivers opened a gap from the rest of the field, as Webber set the fastest lap of the race so far on lap two with a time of 1:33.685. Hamilton attempted an overtake manoeuvre on Webber heading into turn 12 on lap three but was unable to get close to affect a pass. Alonso passed De la Rosa for 12th place on the same lap and began to battle Kobayashi for 11th. Hamilton attempted to pass Webber for a second time at turn 12 on lap four but could not get close enough. This was because Hamilton's car was more effective than Webber's; it allowed Webber to pull away through turn eight but Hamilton could close the gap between himself and Webber in the back straight by employing his car's F-duct. Hülkenberg passed Di Grassi and Chandhok in turn eight to move up into 21st place by lap six, while Webber, Hamilton and Vettel traded the fastest lap with Hamilton quickest on the same lap. McLaren became aware of a higher than expected fuel consumption by the 10h lap and the team ordered both their drivers to change engine modes for fuel conservation. Kobayashi made a pit stop on lap 11 which released Alonso into clean air; Alonso made his pit stop on the following lap for hard tyres and rejoined ahead of Kobayashi. The next few laps saw a large amount of activity in the pit lane. Vettel made his pit stop from third position on lap 15, and rejoined in front of Rosberg, while Button pushed hard in an attempt to move ahead of Vettel. Hamilton and Webber both made their pit stops on the following lap; Webber emerged in front as Hamilton's pit crew were slow to fit Hamilton's left-rear tyre. Hamilton fell to third place behind Vettel.

Button thus inherited the lead but reported to his team via radio that he was losing rear grip in his tyres after pushing hard. He made a pit stop on lap 18 and re-emerged in fourth. Hamilton attempted to pass Vettel around the outside heading into turn 12 on lap 18 but was unable to complete the manoveure after running deep into the corner. By the end of the 19th lap, all of the leading drivers had taken their pit stops. The running order was Webber leading with Vettel, Hamilton and Button in close attendance, then a 15-second gap back to Schumacher, Rosberg and Kubica. Massa in eighth was being caught by Petrov in ninth, and the two were followed by Alonso. The top nine drivers remained in the same positions in which they had qualified, and as the race continued, there was a threat of rain forecast by meteorological service Météo-France which intensified by hot weather and heavy clouds brewing to the west of the circuit. Trulli pulled off to the side of the track with an hydraulic failure, becoming the first retirement on lap 35. Trulli's teammate Kovalainen retired the lap after with a power steering failure in turn eight which was followed by him not being able to operate his gearbox, clutch and throttle and his car was pushed into the Lotus garage.

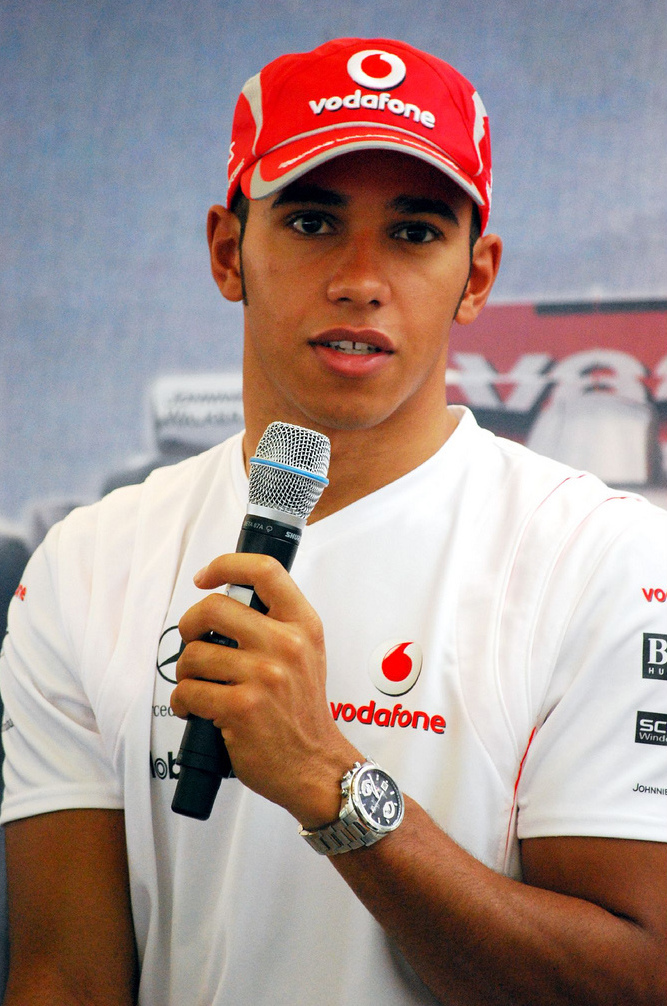
Lewis Hamilton (pictured in 2008) took his first victory of the year.

On lap 39, Webber asked Red Bull to advise Vettel to reduce his speed but his request was rejected due to the quick pace and the close distance between themselves and the McLaren cars. Webber entered fuel-saving mode on lap 40 which lost him performance while Vettel had saved one kilogram of fuel and opted to run on a faster engine setting. Vettel got a run exiting turn 11 and turned left to the inside lane and drew alongside Webber on the back straight. As the pair approached turn 12, they made contact at high-speed which sent Vettel spinning through 360 degrees twice. Both drivers ended on a run-off area and Vettel almost hit Webber again as Hamilton and Button overtook them. Vettel retired with a punctured right-rear tyre and Webber sustained damage to his front wing endplate. The expected rain only manifested as a very light drizzle on lap 41, as Webber made a pit stop for a replacement front wing two laps later. Hamilton was informed by McLaren to conserve fuel on lap 44 as the drivers drove cautiously through turn one because of the light rain. Senna drove to the pit lane to retire with a fuel pressure issue. Button was instructed to conserve fuel although he was not given a target lap time because the team's chief engineer Phil Prew felt Button would not pass his teammate. Hamilton had been told by his race engineer Andy Latham that Button would not overtake him. McLaren asked both drivers to drive cautiously through turn eight where there was a high risk for problems with their front-right tyres.

Button drew alongside teammate Hamilton on lap 48 heading into turn 12 and passed Hamilton (who drove on the inside line) around the outside of the corner. Hamilton reclaimed the lead on the following lap after getting a run on the pit straight and narrowly avoided a collision with Button at turn one. Hamilton began to pull away from teammate Button. Sutil passed Kobayashi around the outside for tenth on lap 52 while Button was ordered to conserve his tyres and fuel on the same lap. Chandhok became the final retirement of the race when he entered the pit lane with a fuel pump failure on lap 53. Alonso attempted to overtake Petrov around the outside of turn one on lap 54 but was unable to get ahead. Alonso tried again going into turn three and Petrov (who had worn tyres) made an error allowing Alonso to move into eighth. Both drivers made contact and Petrov sustained a punctured tyre. Petrov made a pit stop for soft tyres on lap 56 and emerged in 15th. Hamilton maintained his lead throughout the remainder of the race and took the checkered flag on lap 58 to secure his first win of the season, 2.6 seconds in front of teammate Button. Webber was third, ahead of Schumacher who equalled his best result of the season, having finished fourth at the Spanish Grand Prix as well. Rosberg held off Kubica to take fifth, followed by Massa, Alonso, Sutil and Kobayashi. De la Rosa was close behind teammate Kobayashi in 11th. Alguersuari, Liuzzi, Barrichello, Petrov, Buemi, Hülkenberg, Glock, Di Grassi and Chandhok (despite his mechanical issues) were the final classified finishers. Hamilton's victory made him the fifth different driver in seven races to win a Grand Prix in 2010.

== Post-race ==
The top three drivers appeared on the podium to collect their trophies and in a later press conference. Hamilton said the race was "quite exciting" and dedicated the victory to his father Anthony. He stated that he was unfortunate up until the race but was happy that he could help McLaren achieve their second one–two finish of the season. Button said his second-place result was pleasing despite him starting from fourth position, and stated the pace of his McLaren was good. He felt the event was "fun", and praised his team for improving his car which allowed them to challenge Red Bull. Webber revealed that he had been confident that he would be able to take victory having fended off both McLaren cars for the previous 40 laps. He also stated the first stint of the race was "very interesting" and had expected it to be an "interesting race" but revealed he was not as comfortable on the hard-compound tyre.

Much of the post-race debate centred on the Red Bulls' clash at the front of the field on lap 40. Both Webber and Vettel blamed each other for the crash. Team principal Christian Horner implied Webber remained partially responsible for failing to give Vettel enough room on the run to the corner, and he was noticeably frustrated and angry at both of his drivers for wasting a potential 1–2 finish. Red Bull motorsport adviser Helmut Marko insisted the team did not favour Vettel through their strategy and also offered the perspective that Vettel had to attack for fear of backing off into the clutches of Hamilton behind. McLaren chief engineer Tim Goss said the crash had prevented Red Bull from securing a one–two finish, but understood why Webber switched to a different engine mode as he noted that one of Vettel's engines had failed earlier in the season. He felt that the battle between both McLaren and Red Bull drivers for both championships would continue unabated. Red Bull held a meeting at their factory in Milton Keynes four days after the race, and all people in attendance believed the situation had been dealt with. The incident between Webber and Vettel is widely seen by the media as a key moment in the rivalry between the two drivers.

Mercedes maintained they had achieved what the car was capable of with fourth and fifth-place finishes for Schumacher and Rosberg respectively. Massa said it was a "very boring" and "difficult" race from his point of view because he was behind Kubica for the duration of the race whom he could not overtake. Alonso was disappointed with the team's performance in what Ferrari identified as their 800th start, yet he looked forward to upgrades in the following races. James Key, the technical director of BMW Sauber, stated he was happy with the double finish and the one point the team picked up, courtesy of Kobayashi. Despite setting the race's fastest lap, Petrov was disappointed to not finish in a points-scoring position. He said there were many positives he could take from the event and hoped to achieve a stronger result in the Canadian round.

The result extended Webber's lead in the Drivers' Championship to five championship points over Button who moved into second place. Hamilton's victory promoted him to third, while Alonso's eighth-place finish demoted him third to fourth. Vettel's retirement meant he fell from second to fifth. McLaren's one–two result allowed them to assume the lead of the Constructors' Championship with a one-point advantage over Red Bull. Ferrari's poor finish dropped them from second to third, while Mercedes remained in fourth with 100 championship points. Renault retained fifth on 73 championship points, with 12 races left in the season. After their strong finish, Hamilton hoped McLaren's result would give them further momentum to challenge Red Bull for the championship.

=== Race classification ===
Drivers who scored championship points are denoted in bold.

Pos	No	Driver	Constructor	Laps	Time/Retired	Grid	Points
1	2	(United Kingdom) **Lewis Hamilton**	**McLaren-Mercedes**	58	1:28:47.620	2	25
2	1	(United Kingdom) **Jenson Button**	**McLaren-Mercedes**	58	+2.645	4	18
3	6	(Australia) **Mark Webber**	**Red Bull-Renault**	58	+24.285	1	15
4	3	(Germany) **Michael Schumacher**	**Mercedes**	58	+31.110	5	12
5	4	(Germany) **Nico Rosberg**	**Mercedes**	58	+32.266	6	10
6	11	(Poland) **Robert Kubica**	**Renault**	58	+32.824	7	8
7	7	(Brazil) **Felipe Massa**	**Ferrari**	58	+36.635	8	6
8	8	(Spain) **Fernando Alonso**	**Ferrari**	58	+46.544	12	4
9	14	(Germany) **Adrian Sutil**	**Force India-Mercedes**	58	+49.029	11	2
10	23	(Japan) **Kamui Kobayashi**	**BMW Sauber-Ferrari**	58	+1:05.650	10	1
11	22	(Spain) Pedro de la Rosa	BMW Sauber-Ferrari	58	+1:05.944	13	
12	17	(Spain) Jaime Alguersuari	Toro Rosso-Ferrari	58	+1:07.800	16	
13	15	(Italy) Vitantonio Liuzzi	Force India-Mercedes	57	+1 lap	18	
14	9	(Brazil) Rubens Barrichello	Williams-Cosworth	57	+1 lap	15	
15	12	(Russia) Vitaly Petrov	Renault	57	+1 lap	9	
16	16	(Switzerland) Sébastien Buemi	Toro Rosso-Ferrari	57	+1 lap	14	
17	10	(Germany) Nico Hülkenberg	Williams-Cosworth	57	+1 lap	17	
18	24	(Germany) Timo Glock	Virgin-Cosworth	55	+3 laps	21	
19	25	(Brazil) Lucas di Grassi	Virgin-Cosworth	55	+3 laps	PL	
20	20	(India) Karun Chandhok	HRT-Cosworth	52	Fuel pump	24	
Ret	21	(Brazil) Bruno Senna	HRT-Cosworth	46	Fuel pressure	22	
Ret	5	(Germany) Sebastian Vettel	Red Bull-Renault	39	Collision	3	
Ret	19	(Finland) Heikki Kovalainen	Lotus-Cosworth	33	Hydraulics	20	
Ret	18	(Italy) Jarno Trulli	Lotus-Cosworth	32	Hydraulics	19	

== Championship standings after the race ==
Drivers' Championship standings

+/–	Pos.	Driver	Points
	1	(Australia) Mark Webber	93
2	2	(United Kingdom) Jenson Button	88
4	3	(United Kingdom) Lewis Hamilton	84
1	4	(Spain) Fernando Alonso	79
3	5	(Germany) Sebastian Vettel	78

Constructors' Championship standings

+/–	Pos.	Driver	Points
2	1	(United Kingdom) McLaren-Mercedes	172
1	2	(Austria) Red Bull-Renault	171
1	3	(Italy) Ferrari	146
	4	(Germany) Mercedes	100
	5	(France) Renault	73

- Note: Only the top five positions are included for both sets of standings.

== See also ==
- 2010 Istanbul Park GP2 Series round
- 2010 Istanbul Park GP3 Series round

== Explanatory notes ==
Previous race: 2010 Monaco Grand Prix	FIA Formula One World Championship; 2010 season	Next race: 2010 Canadian Grand Prix
Previous race: 2009 Turkish Grand Prix	Turkish Grand Prix	Next race: 2011 Turkish Grand Prix
