= 2018 German Grand Prix =

11th round of the 2018 F1 season

Race 11 of 21 in the 2018 Formula One World Championship
← Previous race	Next race →
- The layout of the Hockenheimring

Race details
- Date: 22 July 2018
- Official name: Formula 1 Emirates Grosser Preis von Deutschland 2018
- Location: Hockenheimring, Hockenheim, Germany
- Course: Permanent racing facility
- Course length: 4.574 km (2.842 miles)
- Distance: 67 laps, 306.458 km (190.424 miles)
- Weather: Overcast with intermittent rain
- Attendance: 165,000

Pole position
Driver	(Germany) Sebastian Vettel	Ferrari
- Time: 1:11.212

Fastest lap
Driver	(United Kingdom) Lewis Hamilton	Mercedes
- Time: 1:15.545 on lap 66

Podium
First	(United Kingdom) Lewis Hamilton	Mercedes
Second	(Finland) Valtteri Bottas	Mercedes
Third	(Finland) Kimi Räikkönen	Ferrari

The 2018 German Grand Prix (officially known as the Formula 1 Emirates Grosser Preis von Deutschland 2018) was a Formula One motor race held on 22 July 2018 at the Hockenheimring in Germany. The race was the 11th round of the 2018 Formula One World Championship and marked the 77th running of the German Grand Prix, and the 63rd time the race had been run as a World Championship event since the inaugural season in 1950.

Lewis Hamilton won the Grand Prix from 14th on the grid, leading a Mercedes 1–2 ahead of teammate Valtteri Bottas after race leader and pole sitter Sebastian Vettel crashed out in light rain conditions. The race was not without controversy as Hamilton was seen to abort a pit stop late in the race, cutting across the infield to rejoin the circuit which was against the international sporting code. He was reprimanded for the rules violation but was allowed to keep his race win. As a result of the race, Mercedes and Hamilton advanced to first place from second in the Constructors' and the Drivers' championship standings respectively.

== Background ==
Formally known as the "Formula 1 Emirates Großer Preis von Deutschland 2018" this was a Formula One race which was held on 22 July 2018. This was the first German Grand Prix since 2016 and it took place at the Hockenheimring near Hockenheim in Baden-Württemberg, Germany. It was the 11th round of 21 in the 2018 Formula One World Championship. The race marked the 77th running of the German Grand Prix and it was the 63rd time it was run as part of the World Championship since the inaugural 1950 season.

Several teams brought car upgrades to this race. Ferrari brought a new exhaust system and a new rear wing. Renault brought an updated front wing and Williams brought an updated aerodynamic package.

=== Championship standings before the race ===
Before the race, Ferrari driver, Sebastian Vettel lead the World Drivers' Championship, with Lewis Hamilton in second place, eight points behind. In the World Constructors' Championship, Ferrari held a twenty–point lead over second placed Mercedes.

=== Entrants ===
There were no stand in drivers for the race but Nicholas Latifi and Antonio Giovinazzi drove in the first practice session instead of Esteban Ocon and Marcus Ericsson for Force India and Sauber respectively.

=== Tyres ===
Tyre supplier Pirelli selected the medium, soft and ultrasoft tyres for the Grand Prix weekend. Of the three the ultrasoft was the least durable but offered the most grip with the medium tyres being the most durable but offering the least grip. In addition to this Pirelli brought the intermediate and full wet tyres for light and heavy standing water conditions respectively.

== Practice ==
As stated in the sporting regulations, three practice sessions were held, the first two were held on the Friday and were each ninety minutes in length with the last practice session taking place on the Saturday, before qualifying, lasting 60 minutes in length.

The first practice session passed without incident and ended with Daniel Ricciardo being fastest for Red Bull. The second practice session also passed without incident and ended with the other Red Bull of Max Verstappen being fastest with Lewis Hamilton finishing a close second in both practice sessions.

Analysis suggested that Hamilton had the strongest one-lap pace, with a mistake costing him the fastest overall time across the opening two practice sessions. Vettel was reported as being confident after practice, with Ferrari having made gains between practice and qualifying in previous rounds, describing the car as "working well". Haas were the fourth-strongest team on one-lap pace, ahead of Sauber. Red Bull had the strongest race pace, approximately 0.2 seconds ahead of Mercedes and Ferrari. Red Bull were unable to do a long-run on the ultrasoft tyres, with Verstappen missing thirty minutes of practice. The fourth fastest team was Renault.

Hamilton downplayed his advantage, stating that he expected his strongest challenge to come from Ferrari, who had a reputation of sandbagging. Verstappen stated that he believed his team, Red Bull, would be able to challenge for the win. Renault driver Nico Hülkenberg stated that he had a "difficult day", where he suffered with tyre-blistering issues. Hülkenberg was testing a new front wing during practice, he was unable to determine the performance gains from the front wing due to limited running, although he would run it across the rest of the weekend. Williams brought an upgraded front and rear wing to test at the event. Both drivers were positive about the changes, and the team elected to continue running the new-spec wings for the remainder of the weekend. Stoffel Vandoorne described the opening day of action as "my worst Friday for a long time", finishing last in both sessions, stating that something was not working with the car.

Whereas the first two practice sessions were dry, final practice took place in heavy rain and as a result only nine drivers set a lap time as the heavy rain would cause the session to provide little useful data. The session ended with Charles Leclerc quickest in his Sauber, ahead of teammate Marcus Ericsson and Williams' Sergey Sirotkin.

== Qualifying ==
As per the regulations, qualifying consisted of three parts, lasting 18, 15 and 12 minutes in length and entitled Q1, Q2 and Q3 respectively, with five drivers being eliminated after each of the first two sessions. The drivers who made it into Q3 would have to start the race on the tyres they had used to set their fastest lap time in Q2.

=== Qualifying report ===
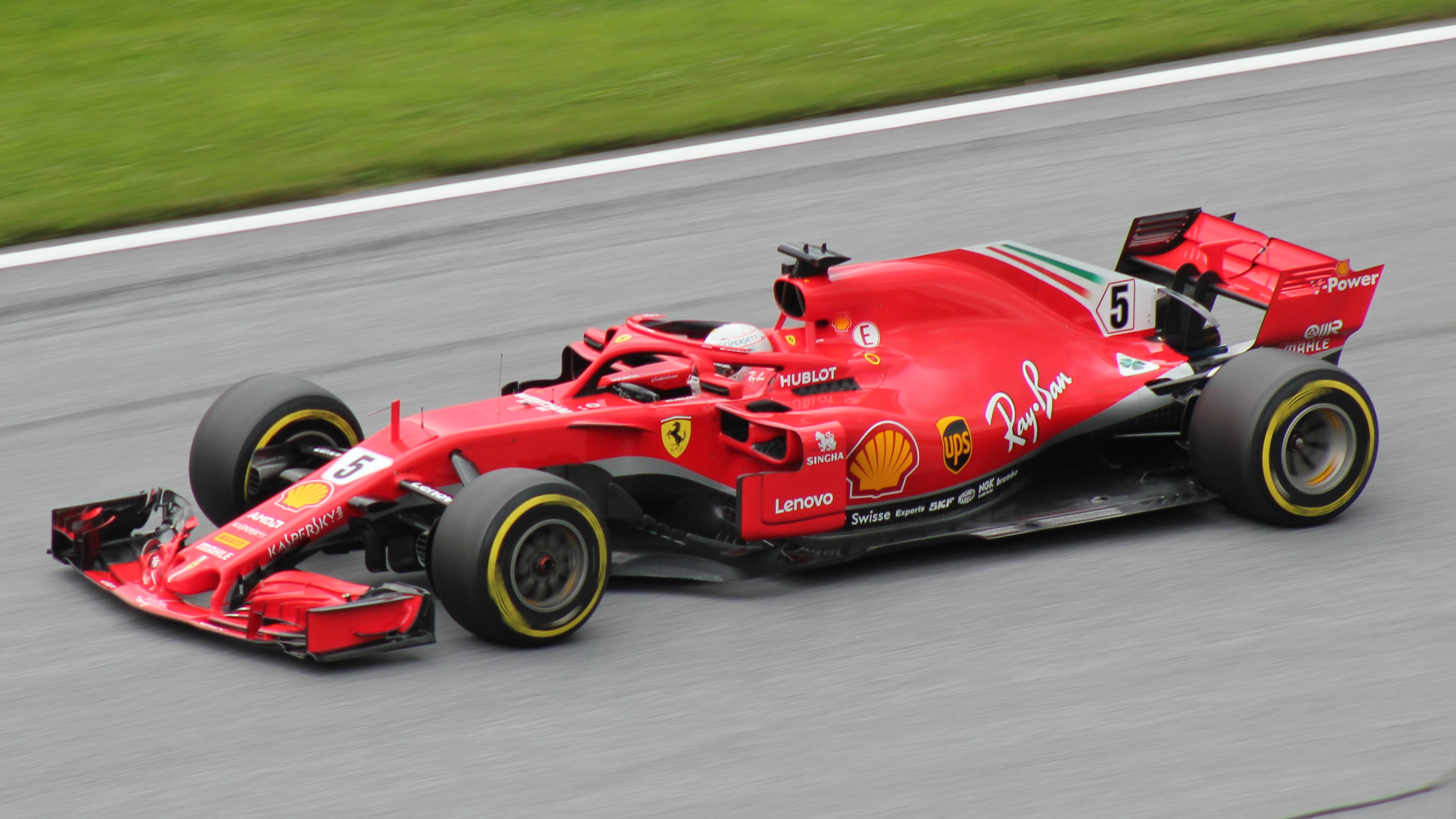
Sebastian Vettel (pictured in his car at the Austrian Grand Prix) secured pole position.

Qualifying started in overcast conditions with an air temperature of 21 °C (70 °F), a relatively cool track temperature of 27 °C (81 °F) and high humidity. Although the track was dry enough for slick tyres the track was still damp in places, this along with the rain earlier in the day meant that a high level of track evolution was expected. (Note: Track evolution refers to the process of the track getting quicker as more cars run on track. During Qualifying this was exaggerated by the rain having washed away the rubber on track and the track drying as the qualifying session progressed.) There was also a high chance of rain latter in the session.

During the first part of qualifying, Kimi Räikkönen set the fastest time for Ferrari. Esteban Ocon, Pierre Gasly, Brendon Hartley, Lance Stroll and Stoffel Vandoorne were eliminated as they finished in the bottom five of the classification. World Championship contender Lewis Hamilton set a time fast enough to progress into Q2, before suffering a hydraulics issue, being unable to change gears. Hamilton was instructed to pull over at the side of the track, to prevent damaging the power unit further.

After around eight minutes Marcus Ericsson made a mistake at the Sachs curve spinning into the gravel trap. As he made it out of the run-off area, he left gravel on the track. This caused the red flag to be waved after several drivers complained about the gravel on the track. After the gravel had been cleared there were still seven minutes of the session left. At the session end positions eleven to fifteen were taken by Alonso, Sirotkin, Ericsson, Hamilton and Ricciardo, eliminating them from qualifying. Neither Hamilton nor Ricciardo contested the session, Riccardo due to an impeding grid penalty meaning he would start at the back regardless of his qualifying position. All of the drivers who had gotten into Q3 had set their times on the ultrasoft tyres meaning they would all have to start on that tyre.

In the final segment of qualifying, it was Sebastian Vettel who secured pole position, with an outright lap record of 1 minute and 11.212 seconds. Valtteri Bottas was second, two tenths of a second further back, ahead of Vettel's teammate Kimi Räikkönen in third. The top ten was rounded out by Max Verstappen, Kevin Magnussen, Romain Grosjean, Nico Hülkenberg, Carlos Sainz Jr, Charles Leclerc and Sergio Pérez in tenth.

=== Post qualifying ===
Sebastian Vettel described his qualifying lap as one of his "best moments" in Formula One with his pole making him the favourite for the race. Charles Leclerc was also pleased with his qualifying position of ninth place after he suffered from brake problems in qualifying with Kevin Magnussen also pleased with his qualifying which gave Haas their best ever qualifying result in fifth and sixth. After spinning in Q2, Marcus Ericsson said he was disappointed with his qualifying and that he thought they would be able to get into the top ten for the race. Another driver who thought they could get into the points after a disappointing qualifying was Esteban Ocon who would start the race in fifteenth after he only got one session of dry running in practice limiting his preparation for qualifying. Stoffel Vandoorne and Lance Stroll both put their poor qualifying performances down to bad balance in their respective cars. Toro Rosso also suffered from a disappointing qualifying, they were optimistic heading into the race stating that they had some of the best long run pace from the other midfield teams.

=== Qualifying classification ===
Pos.	Car no.	Driver	Constructor	Qualifying times			Final grid
Pos.	Car no.	Driver	Constructor	Q1	Q2	Q3	Final grid
1	5	(Germany) Sebastian Vettel	Ferrari	1:12.538	1:12.505	1:11.212	1
2	77	(Finland) Valtteri Bottas	Mercedes	1:12.962	1:12.152	1:11.416	2
3	7	(Finland) Kimi Räikkönen	Ferrari	1:12.505	1:12.336	1:11.547	3
4	33	(Netherlands) Max Verstappen	Red Bull Racing-TAG Heuer	1:13.127	1:12.188	1:11.822	4
5	20	(Denmark) Kevin Magnussen	Haas-Ferrari	1:13.105	1:12.523	1:12.200	5
6	8	(France) Romain Grosjean	Haas-Ferrari	1:12.986	1:12.722	1:12.544	6
7	27	(Germany) Nico Hülkenberg	Renault	1:13.479	1:12.946	1:12.560	7
8	55	(Spain) Carlos Sainz Jr.	Renault	1:13.324	1:13.032	1:12.692	8
9	16	(Monaco) Charles Leclerc	Sauber-Ferrari	1:13.077	1:12.995	1:12.717	9
10	11	(Mexico) Sergio Pérez	Force India-Mercedes	1:13.427	1:13.072	1:12.774	10
11	14	(Spain) Fernando Alonso	McLaren-Renault	1:13.614	1:13.657	N/A	11
12	35	(Russia) Sergey Sirotkin	Williams-Mercedes	1:13.708	1:13.702	N/A	12
13	9	(Sweden) Marcus Ericsson	Sauber-Ferrari	1:13.562	1:13.736	N/A	13
14	44	(United Kingdom) Lewis Hamilton	Mercedes	1:13.012	No time	N/A	14
15	3	(Australia) Daniel Ricciardo	Red Bull Racing-TAG Heuer	1:13.318	No time	N/A	19^{1}
16	31	(France) Esteban Ocon	Force India-Mercedes	1:13.720	N/A	N/A	15
17	10	(France) Pierre Gasly	Scuderia Toro Rosso-Honda	1:13.749	N/A	N/A	20^{2}
18	28	(New Zealand) Brendon Hartley	Scuderia Toro Rosso-Honda	1:14.045	N/A	N/A	16
19	18	(Canada) Lance Stroll	Williams-Mercedes	1:14.206	N/A	N/A	17
20	2	(Belgium) Stoffel Vandoorne	McLaren-Renault	1:14.401	N/A	N/A	18
107% time: 1:17.580

Notes

- ^1 – Daniel Ricciardo received a 20-place grid penalty for exceeding his quota of power unit elements.
- ^2 – Pierre Gasly received a 30-place grid penalty for exceeding his quota of power unit elements.

== Race ==
The race was scheduled to start at 15:10 local time (13:10 UTC) and was scheduled to last 67 laps with an upper time limit of 2 hours per the 2018 regulations.

=== Race report ===
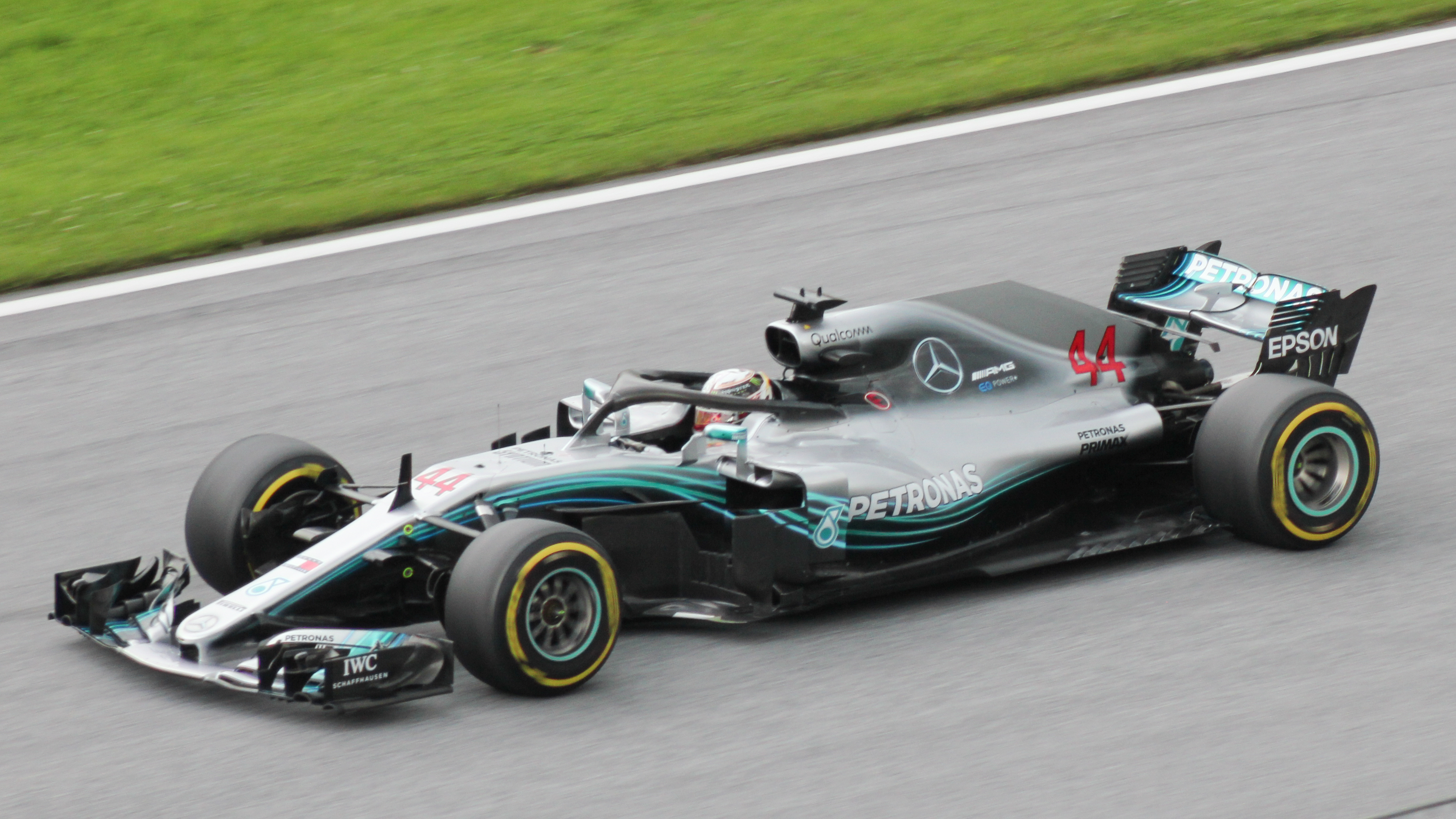
Lewis Hamilton (pictured in his car at the Austrian Grand Prix) won the race.

The race started in dry conditions, with a high chance of rain later in the race. As they went through turn 1 it was Sebastian Vettel who led for Ferrari followed by Valtteri Bottas and Kimi Räikkönen. Of the front runners, Räikkönen was the first to make a pitstop on lap 14 switching onto the soft tyres, Vettel and Bottas made their opening pitstops on laps 24 and 28 respectively. With the leaders on lap 29, the race saw its first retirement in the form of Ricciardo with what transpired to be power loss, this did not disrupt the rhythm of the race as his car was recovered quickly. On the same lap Ricciardo's teammate Max Verstappen made his first pit stop. On lap 29, it was Räikkönen who led, followed by Vettel, Hamilton (yet to make his compulsory pitstop) and Bottas. After a couple of laps Vettel slowed down after complaining of overheating tyres from being with a couple of seconds behind Räikkönen and on lap 39 Räikkönen was told to let his teammate through.

On lap 44, it started to rain and on the following lap Fernando Alonso and Charles Leclerc came into the pits to put on the intermediate tyres and Pierre Gasly changed to a set of full wet tyres, all three admitted this was a mistake in post-race interviews. On lap 46 Vettel mounted the kerb at the final corner and lost a small portion of his front wing. On lap 52, braking into turn 12, Vettel locked the rear brakes and went straight on into the barriers, taking himself out of the race, this caused a safety car so that they could recover Vettel's car. As a result of the safety car Valtteri Bottas elected to make a pitstop, because of the late call Mercedes did not have the tyres ready and Bottas was in his pitbox for almost 20 seconds (pitstops times are usually 2–3 seconds). Hamilton was also told to pit, he started to enter the pitlane before aborting the pitstop after a miscommunication with his engineer, Hamilton then cut back on to the track essentially cutting across the final corner. Räikkönen made a pitstop on the following lap onto the ultra soft tyres. On lap 58 the race resumed, with Hamilton leading ahead of Bottas and Räikkönen. Bottas initially attacked Hamilton for the lead, before being told to "hold position". The race was won by Hamilton with Bottas and Räikkönen completing the podium. Sainz was tenth at the finish before the application of a ten-second time penalty for overtaking behind the safety car dropped him to 12th.

=== Post race ===
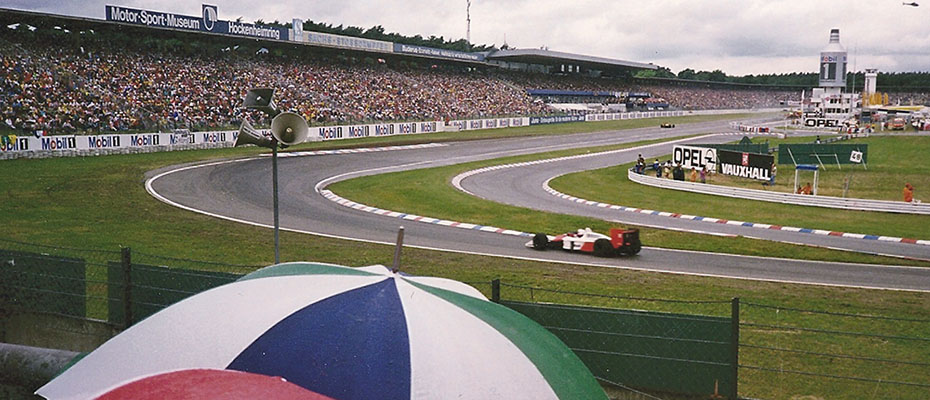
The pit entry (pictured at the 1988 German Grand Prix). Hamilton was on the pit entry (on the inside of the grass) and cut across the grass to rejoin the main track which was against the rules.

Approximately 90 minutes after the race finished Lewis Hamilton was summoned to the stewards for crossing the line between the pit entrance and the track when he aborted his pitstop on lap 53 which, according to the international sporting code, is prohibited. The stewards gave Hamilton a reprimand. The stewards justified their decision by saying that because Hamilton cut across the pit entry line in such a way that he did not present a danger to anyone and because the change of direction was carried out safely a reprimand would best reflect the severity of the infringement of the rules.

Hamilton described his race win as a "dream" and said that he felt that this was a potential turning point in his championship campaign. Sebastian Vettel, meanwhile, admitted that the crash which took him out of the race was his fault, but he said that overall he was happy with how the weekend had progressed as it appeared that Ferrari still had the quickest car, something which Mercedes team principal Toto Wolff also picked up on. Another driver who had a strong performance was Nico Hülkenberg who finished in seasons best position of fifth, a result which he admitted he was very happy with, his teammate Carlos Sainz finished a disappointing twelfth, however on the whole Renault were pleased with their result. Another team with mixed fortune were the Haas cars, Romain Grosjean and Kevin Magnussen were among those who switched to intermediates and back again during the rain period and although Grosjean managed to get through the field from tenth to sixth in the closing laps his teammate Magnussen was unable to replicate this finishing eleventh, with team principal Guenther Steiner appearing to be neither pleased nor disappointed with the result.

Brendon Hartley was also pleased with his result following a difficult first half of his 2018 season. His teammate, Pierre Gasly however suffered from a poor strategy call causing him to finish fourteenth, although the team were neither pleased nor disappointed with their result team boss Franz Tost said that the weekend gave them optimism for future Grands Prix after the team showed strong pace. Force India were also very pleased with their performance with Sergio Pérez finishing seventh, one place ahead of Esteban Ocon who had started a disappointing fifteenth but finished eighth. Red Bull had a mixed day with Daniel Ricciardo retiring but with Max Verstappen finishing in fourth, although there was a chance for them to finish on the podium Verstappen said that he felt positively about how the weekend had progressed. Sauber also had a mixed day with Marcus Ericsson finishing in the points but teammate Charles Leclerc had a disappointing race coming last of the finishers in fifteenth. Williams and McLaren both had bad weekends, although both Williams' cars were running relatively well, poor reliability meant that both cars were forced to retire, the second and third retirements for the car all season, at McLaren meanwhile Fernando Alonso also had to retire with mechanical problems and although teammate Stoffel Vandoorne did manage to finish the race he still had a poor weekend with the team's sporting director Gil de Ferran stating that he felt that the car and both drivers had the ability to finish in the points.

=== Race classification ===
Pos.	No.	Driver	Constructor	Laps	Time/Retired	Grid	Points
1	44	(United Kingdom) Lewis Hamilton	Mercedes	67	1:32:29.845	14	25
2	77	(Finland) Valtteri Bottas	Mercedes	67	+4.535	2	18
3	7	(Finland) Kimi Räikkönen	Ferrari	67	+6.732	3	15
4	33	(Netherlands) Max Verstappen	Red Bull Racing-TAG Heuer	67	+7.654	4	12
5	27	(Germany) Nico Hülkenberg	Renault	67	+26.609	7	10
6	8	(France) Romain Grosjean	Haas-Ferrari	67	+28.871	6	8
7	11	(Mexico) Sergio Pérez	Force India-Mercedes	67	+30.556	10	6
8	31	(France) Esteban Ocon	Force India-Mercedes	67	+31.750	15	4
9	9	(Sweden) Marcus Ericsson	Sauber-Ferrari	67	+32.362	13	2
10	28	(New Zealand) Brendon Hartley	Scuderia Toro Rosso-Honda	67	+34.197	16	1
11	20	(Denmark) Kevin Magnussen	Haas-Ferrari	67	+34.919	5	
12	55	(Spain) Carlos Sainz Jr.	Renault	67	+43.069^{1}	8	
13	2	(Belgium) Stoffel Vandoorne	McLaren-Renault	67	+46.617	18	
14	10	(France) Pierre Gasly	Scuderia Toro Rosso-Honda	66	+1 lap	20	
15	16	(Monaco) Charles Leclerc	Sauber-Ferrari	66	+1 lap	9	
16^{2}	14	(Spain) Fernando Alonso	McLaren-Renault	65	Gearbox	11	
Ret	18	(Canada) Lance Stroll	Williams-Mercedes	53	Brakes	17	
Ret	5	(Germany) Sebastian Vettel	Ferrari	51	Accident	1	
Ret	35	(Russia) Sergey Sirotkin	Williams-Mercedes	51	Oil leak	12	
Ret	3	(Australia) Daniel Ricciardo	Red Bull Racing-TAG Heuer	27	Power loss	19	

Notes

- ^1 – Carlos Sainz originally finished 10th, but received a 10-second penalty for overtaking under safety car conditions demoting him to 12th.
- ^2 – Fernando Alonso retired from the race, but was classified as he completed more than 90% of the race distance.

== Championship standings after the race ==
In the Drivers' Championship, Lewis Hamilton took first place from Sebastian Vettel, further back Valtteri Bottas overtook Daniel Ricciardo for fourth place. Sergio Pérez and Carlos Sainz swapped positions with Perez climbing to tenth from twelfth and Sainz dropping two positions. Romain Grosjean jumped two positions to thirteenth knocking Pierre Gasly and Charles Leclerc down one position each to fourteenth and fifteenth respectively. Marcus Ericsson also took seventeenth place from Lance Stroll with the rest of the positions being unchanged.

In the Constructors' Championship the only changes in the standings were Mercedes who took the lead from Ferrari and Force India who took fifth place from Haas.

Drivers' Championship standings

	Pos.	Driver	Points
1	1	(United Kingdom) Lewis Hamilton	188
1	2	(Germany) Sebastian Vettel	171
	3	(Finland) Kimi Räikkönen	131
1	4	(Finland) Valtteri Bottas	122
1	5	(Australia) Daniel Ricciardo	106

Constructors' Championship standings

	Pos.	Constructor	Points
1	1	(Germany) Mercedes	310
1	2	(Italy) Ferrari	302
	3	(Austria) Red Bull Racing-TAG Heuer	211
	4	(France) Renault	80
1	5	Force India-Mercedes	59

Notes

- Because Force India and Haas have the same number of points their best result is considered. Force India's best result was third at the 2018 Azerbaijan Grand Prix and Haas' best result was fourth as the 2018 Austrian Grand Prix, therefore Force India are ranked above Haas in the standings.
- Only the top five positions are listed for both sets of standings. Points are accurate at the final declaration of results, Force India's points were subsequently voided.

== Footnotes ==
Previous race: 2018 British Grand Prix	FIA Formula One World Championship; 2018 season	Next race: 2018 Hungarian Grand Prix
Previous race: 2016 German Grand Prix	German Grand Prix	Next race: 2019 German Grand Prix
