= Red Bull RB6 =

Formula One motor racing car

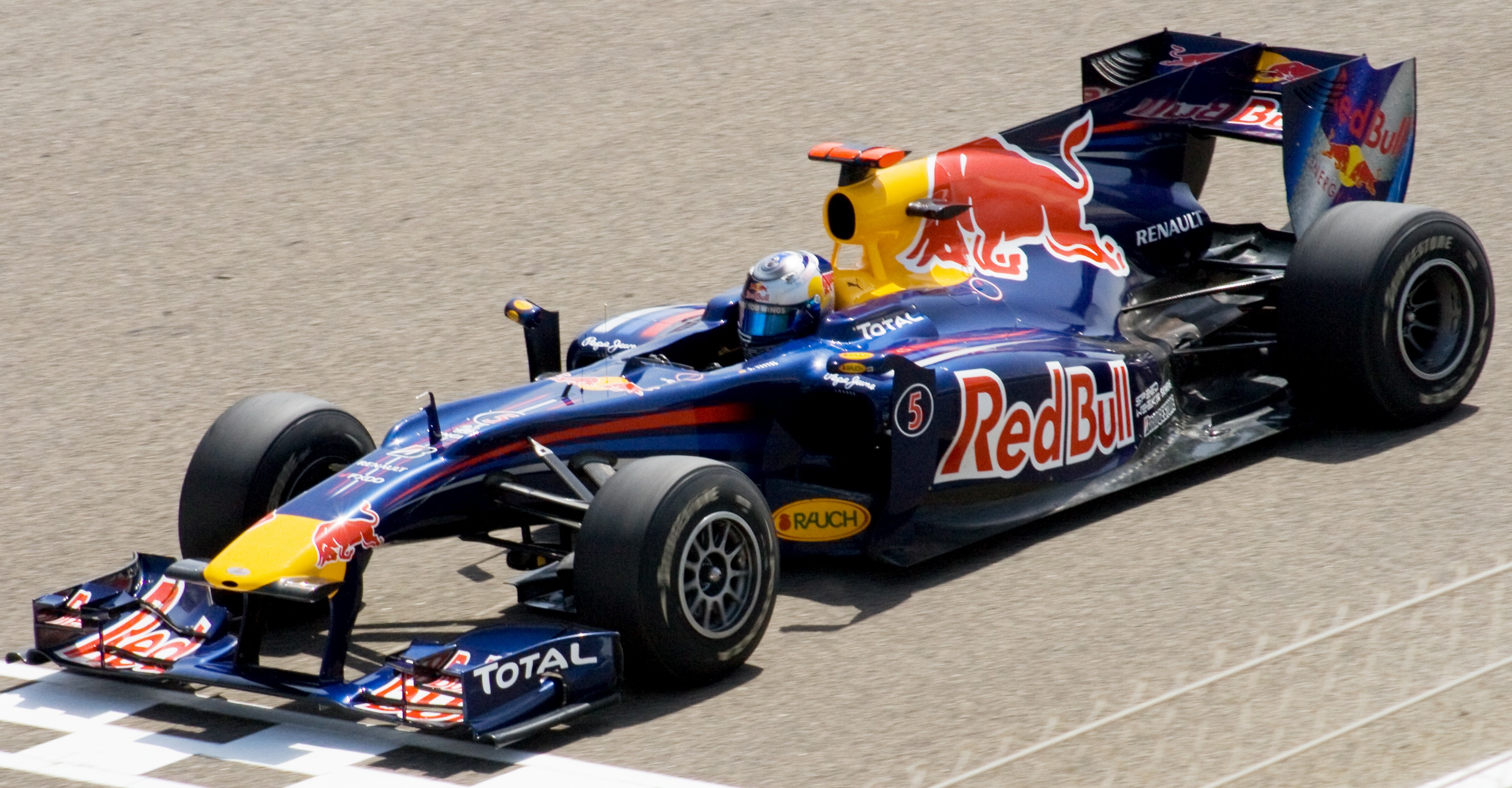
- Sebastian Vettel driving the RB6 in the practice session of Bahrain Grand Prix.
- Category: Formula One
- Constructor: Red Bull
- Designers: Adrian Newey (Chief Technical Officer); Rob Marshall (Chief Designer); Steve Winstanley (Deputy Chief Designer, Composites and Structures); David Worner (Deputy Chief Designer, Mechanics and Suspension); Mark Ellis (Chief Engineer, Performance); Andrew Green (Head of R&D); Giles Wood (Chief Engineer, Simulation and Analysis); Peter Prodromou (Chief Engineer, Aerodynamics); Dan Fallows (Chief Aerodynamicist)
- Predecessor: Red Bull RB5
- Successor: Red Bull RB7

Technical specifications
- Chassis: carbon-fibre and honeycomb composite monocoque, designed and built in-house, carrying engine as fully stressed member
- Suspension (front): Aluminium alloy uprights, carbon-composite double wishbones with springs and anti-roll bar, push rod-actuated Multimatic dampers
- Suspension (rear): as front, except pull rod-actuated rear dampers
- Engine: Renault RS27-2010 2,400 cc (146.5 cu in) 90° V8, limited to 18,000 RPM naturally aspirated mid-mounted
- Transmission: Seven-speed semi-automatic gearbox with reverse gear Hydraulic system for power shift and clutch operation
- Power: >750 hp @ 18,000 rpm
- Weight: 620 kg (1,367 lb) (including driver)
- Fuel: Total
- Tyres: Bridgestone Potenza; OZ Wheels (front and rear): 13"

Competition history
- Notable entrants: Red Bull Racing
- Notable drivers: 5. (Germany) Sebastian Vettel; 6. (Australia) Mark Webber
- Debut: 2010 Bahrain Grand Prix
- First win: 2010 Malaysian Grand Prix
- Last win: 2010 Abu Dhabi Grand Prix
- Last event: 2010 Abu Dhabi Grand Prix
Races	Wins	Podiums	Poles	F/Laps
19	9	20	15	6
- Constructors' Championships: 1 (2010)
- Drivers' Championships: 1 (2010, Sebastian Vettel)

The Red Bull RB6 is a Formula One motor racing car designed by Red Bull Racing for the 2010 campaign. It was driven by 2010 World Champion Sebastian Vettel and Mark Webber and was launched on February 10 at Jerez.

Vettel, who (since joining Scuderia Toro Rosso) had made it a habit to give his racing cars names, named his RB6 "Luscious Liz". However, after unspecified minor damage was found on this chassis after the Monaco Grand Prix, the team gave Vettel a new chassis, which he then named "Randy Mandy."

Known as RB6-03, Webber revealed in 2019 to V8 Sleuth in Australia that he had acquired "Luscious Liz" as part of his contract. He revealed the car won the Malaysian Grand Prix with Vettel, and he himself had won the British and Hungarian Grands Prix with the car. It was additionally responsible for the Belgian Grand Prix pole position.

The car claimed the first of four consecutive World Constructors' Championships for Red Bull Racing, and in the hands of Sebastian Vettel, took the first World Drivers' Championship of his career at the last round of the season. In qualifying, the RB6 was a consistent pace setter, setting the fastest time in 15 out of the 19 rounds. Red Bull's chief technical officer Adrian Newey later went on to claim that the car was "probably the car with the most downforce in the history of F1".

In 2014, before his final race with Red Bull, Vettel stated that the RB6 was his favourite Formula One car to drive in his career to date.

The Red Bull RB6 was the last customer-engined Formula One car to win the constructors' title, due to a presence of Renault full-factory team until the Mercedes-powered McLaren MCL38 in 2024. From 2011 to 2015, Red Bull Racing was officially promoted to Renault full-works partnership independent team. The Red Bull RB6 was also the first Renault-powered car outside Enstone-based full-works team to win the constructors' title since the Williams FW19 in 1997.

== Racing history ==
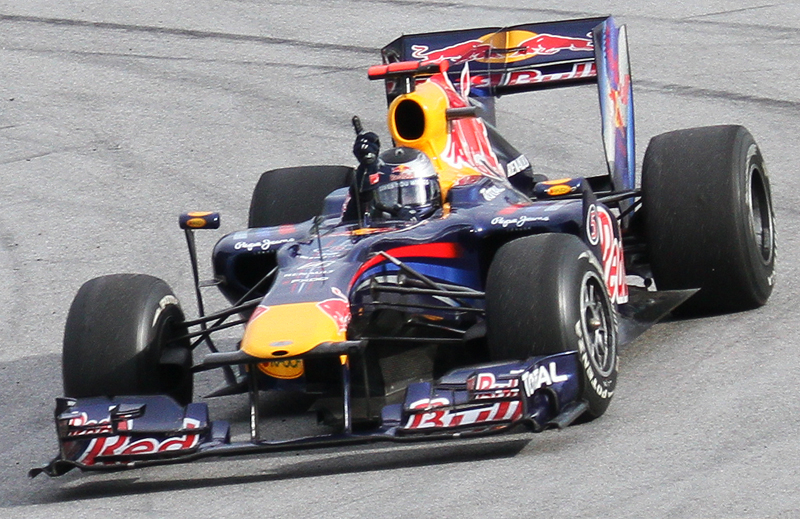
Vettel achieved the RB6's first win at the Malaysian Grand Prix, having started on pole at the first two Grands Prix in Bahrain and Australia.

During qualifying for the Bahrain Grand Prix, Vettel set the fastest times in Q2 and Q3 clinching pole by just over a tenth of second from Ferrari's Felipe Massa. From the lights Vettel led until lap 33 when the car had what was at first thought to be a broken exhaust but was later revealed to be a spark plug problem which reduced the power and straight line speed. Over the remaining laps of the race Vettel dropped down to fourth behind both Ferraris and Lewis Hamilton where he would finish the race. Webber finished 8th.

Vettel achieved his second consecutive pole position in Australia, while Webber qualified in second position. Technical problems plagued Vettel for a second consecutive race when a loose wheel nut ended his challenge while leading. Webber had to stay on track longer as Vettel pitted for dry tyres, and finished in ninth position after a late-race incident with Lewis Hamilton. In Malaysia the Red Bull drivers scored a dominant 1-2 finish, with Vettel winning. In China both cars started from the front row of the starting grid, but rain affected the race and they finished down the order in sixth and eighth positions. In Spain, Webber took pole position and won the race with teammate Vettel finishing third after a major brake problem in the last 8 laps. In Monte Carlo Webber again took pole position and dominated the race. Sebastian Vettel passed Robert Kubica's Renault on lap one and remained in second position for the remainder of the race distance, completing Red Bull's second 1-2 of the season.

In Turkey, Webber claimed pole for the third straight time in qualifying, while Vettel managed third, behind Lewis Hamilton. In the race, Vettel managed to overtake Hamilton during the pit stops to run in second place for much of the race. Webber and Vettel were on course for Red Bull's third 1-2 of the 2010 season, until lap 40 when Vettel and Webber collided with each other as a result of an attempted overtake by Vettel. The crash forced Vettel out of the race and put an end to Webber's chance of victory. The race ended in a McLaren 1–2 instead of a Red Bull 1–2, with Hamilton winning and Jenson Button coming in second. Webber eventually finished in third place. Webber managed to hold on to first place in the Drivers' Championship, with a five-point lead over second placed Button. Vettel however slipped to fifth place. Red Bull also surrendered first place in the Constructors' Championship to McLaren, albeit being behind by only one point.

In Canada, both Red Bulls suffered from a lack of straight line speed and finished only 4th and 5th. With McLaren scoring a second consecutive 1-2 finish, the team dropped to 22 points behind in the constructors' table.

In Valencia, the team bounced back, as Vettel won his first race since Malaysia while Webber had a spectacular accident colliding with Heikki Kovalainen and flipping over at 190 mph (310 km/h) and hitting an advertising board, miraculously escaping unhurt from the incident.

At Silverstone, an inter-team feud broke out after Red Bull brought two updated front wings to the race. After one was broken when it became detached from Vettel's car in the third free practice session, Vettel was given the second wing for qualifying based upon championship positions and practice pace, which left team-mate Webber frustrated. With the new wing, Vettel qualified on pole with Webber recording the second-fastest time in the session. During the race, however, Webber made a better start than his team-mate and overhauled Vettel into the first corner, while Vettel suffered a puncture due to contact with the front wing endplate of Lewis Hamilton's McLaren, which dropped him to the tail of the field. He would recover to seventh place, while Webber went on to take his third victory of the season. On the slow-down lap, Webber, still angry at the situation, told his team over the radio that his victory was "not bad for a number two driver", and in the post-race press conference, he stated that he would not have signed a contract extension with the team - having signed a contract extension for 2011 in the preceding month - had he believed he was going to be treated unfavourably to Vettel.

Vettel took poles in Germany and Hungary but failed to win either race, taking third places in both races. Webber suffered a problem with a lack of oil in the engine of his car, and finished sixth at Hockenheim. At the Hungaroring, the Red Bull cars were the pacesetters, and Webber won the race after capitalising on a drive-through penalty for Vettel, for falling over ten lengths behind Webber during a safety car period. With victory, Webber returned to the top of the championship, whilst Red Bull retook the lead in the Constructors' Championship.

In Belgium, Webber took pole while Vettel qualified fourth. In the race, Webber finished second behind Hamilton, while Vettel lost control of his car trying to pass Jenson Button into the Bus Stop chicane, damaging his front wing and ending Button's race by damaging his car's radiators. Vettel immediately pitted for a new front wing and appeared to be threatening to regain a points-scoring position before he sustained a puncture to his right-rear tyre after clipping Vitantonio Liuzzi's front wing during an attempted overtake; Vettel eventually finished a lap down in 15th, dropping him down the order in the drivers' standings.

At Monza, Webber qualified fourth and Vettel sixth. Both got poor starts however and Webber recovered to sixth and with a clever strategy Vettel finished fourth. Webber retook the championship lead after Hamilton retired. In Singapore, Vettel dominated practice; in qualifying he qualified second after a few minor errors cost him pole. In the race he put intense pressure on Alonso and finished just two tenths of a second behind. Webber used a different strategy and moved through the field; he got past the McLarens and despite colliding with Hamilton midway through the race, hung on to finish behind his team-mate in third.

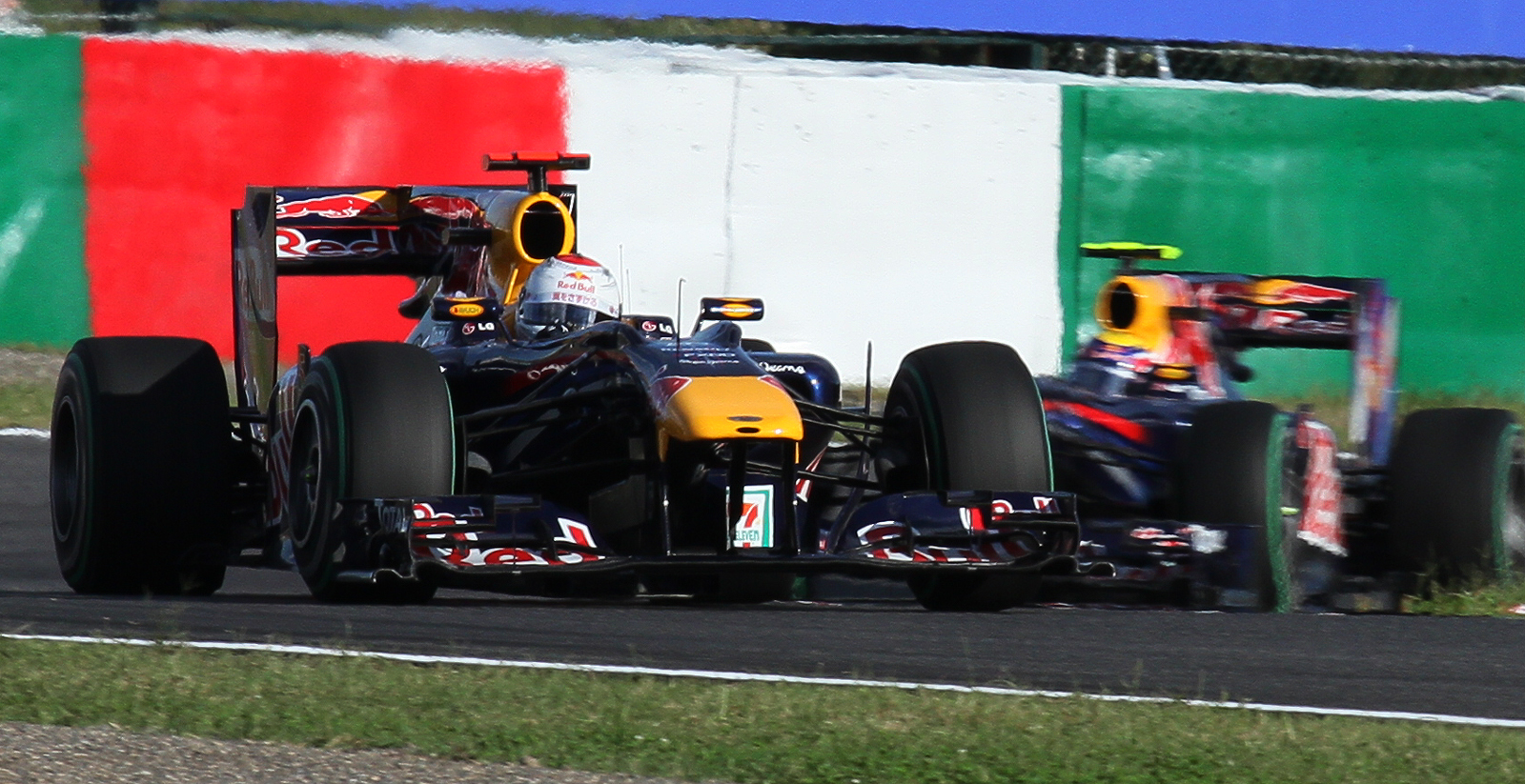
Vettel leads Webber at the Japanese Grand Prix.

In Japan, Red Bull dominated the weekend, finishing 1-2 in every session of the weekend except the rain-disrupted Saturday practice session. Vettel claimed pole position in Sunday qualifying – delayed from Saturday due to rain – and Webber claimed the remaining front-row slot to make it the seventh all-Red Bull front row of the season. Vettel led away from pole in the race, whilst Webber lost out to Robert Kubica at the start and ran third during the early safety car period. He regained second place upon the retirement of Kubica early in the race, and from this point onwards there was never a threat of Red Bull not finishing 1-2. After Vettel and Webber's respective tyre stops, they were running second and third behind Jenson Button, who was on a contrary strategy and had not pitted with the rest of the field. So sure were the Red Bulls of victory that they contented themselves with running behind Button, until he pitted late in the race and they resumed their one-two lead. As in 2009, Vettel had claimed pole position and won the race, and looked set to claim the fastest lap as well - however, this was denied him by Webber, who set the fastest lap on the last lap just as in the previous year's race.

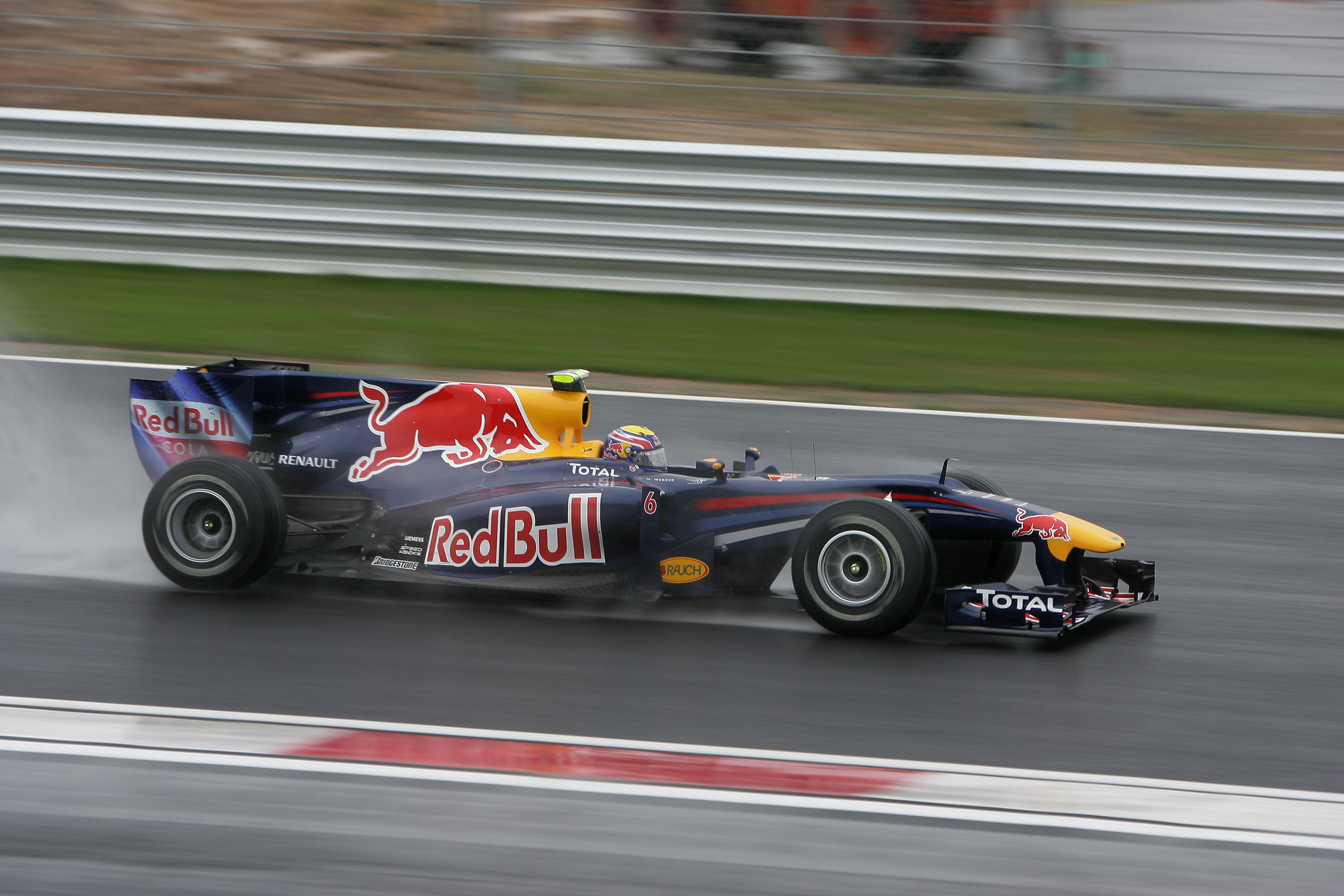
Webber during the Korean Grand Prix. The race resulted in his loss of the championship lead to Alonso and Red Bull's only double DNF that year.

In Korea, Red Bull again dominated qualifying by locking out the front row and looked set to clinch the constructors' championship with two races to spare. However, in a dramatic rain-soaked race, neither car ended up finishing, with Webber crashing early on in the race and taking out Nico Rosberg's Mercedes and Vettel suffering an engine failure whilst leading with ten laps to go. Webber thus lost the lead of the drivers' championship, and Vettel's chances took a major blow. However, both drivers remained optimistic that they could get the job done heading into the final two races of the championship.

In Brazil, Vettel took the race victory from second on the grid with Mark Webber finishing second, which secured the team the Constructors' Championship. In Abu Dhabi, Vettel clinched his maiden drivers' world title by winning the race from pole position, as erstwhile championship rival and team-mate Webber finished eighth, himself finishing just behind another title rival, Ferrari's Fernando Alonso.

== Sponsorship and livery ==
The RB6 was painted primarily in dark blue, yellow, and red. The sponsors Bridgestone, LG, Pepe Jeans, Rauch, Red Bull, Renault, and Total were featured on the vehicle.

At the British and German Grands Prix, the Amazing Thailand logo could be seen on the sides of the cars. At the Japanese Grand Prix, the sponsor 7-Eleven appeared on the endplate of the car's bargeboards.

At the Brazilian Grand Prix, the Brazilian telecommunications company Sky logo could be seen on the bargeboard of the cars.

== Other ==
The car appears in the video game F1 2010 as one of the cars of the 2010 season. In June 2017, Codemasters announced that the car will reappear in F1 2017 as a classic car. In July 2018, it was announced that it would reappear as one of the classic cars in F1 2018. It also appeared in F1 2019 and F1 2020 as a classic car.

== Complete Formula One results ==
(key) (results in bold indicate pole position; results in italics indicate fastest lap)

Year	Entrant	Engine	Tyres	Drivers	1	2	3	4	5	6	7	8	9	10	11	12	13	14	15	16	17	18	19	Points	WCC
2010	Red Bull Racing	Renault RS27 V8	**B**		BHR	AUS	MAL	CHN	ESP	MON	TUR	CAN	EUR	GBR	GER	HUN	BEL	ITA	SIN	JPN	KOR	BRA	ABU	**498**	**1st**
2010	Red Bull Racing	Renault RS27 V8	**B**	(Germany) Sebastian Vettel	**4**	**Ret**	1	**6**	3	2	Ret	4	**1**	**7**	**3**	**3**	15	4	2	**1**	**Ret**	1	**1**	**498**	**1st**
2010	Red Bull Racing	Renault RS27 V8	**B**	(Australia) Mark Webber	8	9	**2**	8	**1**	**1**	**3**	5	Ret	1	6	1	**2**	6	3	2	Ret	2	8	**498**	**1st**

Awards
Preceded by Brawn BGP 001	Autosport; Racing Car Of The Year; 2010	Succeeded by Red Bull RB7
