= 2010 Chinese Grand Prix =

Formula One motor race held in 2010

Race 4 of 19 in the 2010 Formula One World Championship
← Previous race	Next race →

Race details
- Date: 18 April 2010
- Official name: 2010 Formula 1 Chinese Grand Prix
- Location: Shanghai International Circuit, Shanghai, China
- Course: Permanent racing facility
- Course length: 5.451 km (3.387 mi)
- Distance: 56 laps, 305.066 km (189.568 mi) (Note: There is a offset of 0.190 km (0.118 mi) between the start and finish lines.)
- Weather: Cloudy, rain
- Attendance: 85,000

Pole position
Driver	(Germany) Sebastian Vettel	Red Bull-Renault
- Time: 1:34.558

Fastest lap
Driver	(United Kingdom) Lewis Hamilton	McLaren-Mercedes
- Time: 1:42.061 on lap 13

Podium
First	(United Kingdom) Jenson Button	McLaren-Mercedes
Second	(United Kingdom) Lewis Hamilton	McLaren-Mercedes
Third	(Germany) Nico Rosberg	Mercedes

The 2010 Chinese Grand Prix (officially the 2010 Formula 1 Chinese Grand Prix) was a Formula One motor race held before approximately 85,000 spectators at the Shanghai International Circuit in the Jiading District of Shanghai on 18 April 2010. It was the fourth race of the 2010 Formula One World Championship and the seventh Chinese Grand Prix. McLaren driver Jenson Button won the 56-lap race starting from fifth position. His teammate Lewis Hamilton finished in second and Nico Rosberg of the Mercedes team was third.

Red Bull driver Sebastian Vettel qualified on pole position for the eighth time of his career by posting the fastest lap in qualifying. Ferrari's Fernando Alonso started from third and passed both Red Bull cars into the first corner. However, the stewards deemed that he had jumped the start and incurred a drive-through penalty. The safety car was deployed on the first lap, after a three-car collision at turn six, and remained out for four laps. Rosberg led from laps three to 19 until Button overtook him. Intermittent rain made track conditions slippery though Button maintained the lead for the rest of the race to secure his second victory of the season and the ninth of his career.

Button's win promoted him to the lead of the World Drivers' Championship for the first time in the season from Massa. Rosberg moved to second while Alonso dropped to third and tied on championship points with Hamilton. Vettel fell from joint third to fifth in the standings. The lead of the World Constructors' Championship changed from Ferrari to McLaren as Red Bull maintained a hold on third place with 15 races remaining in the season.

== Background ==
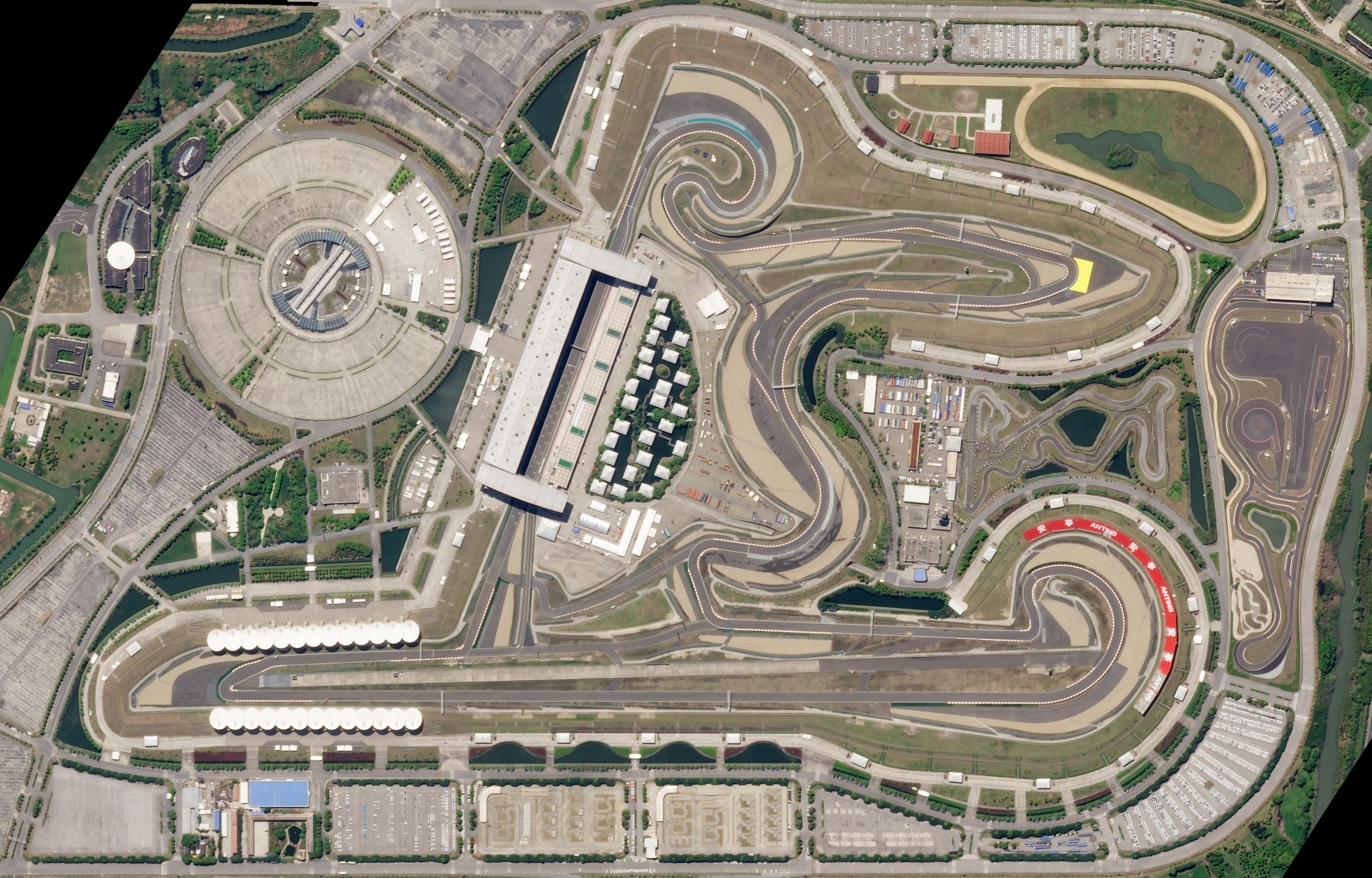
The Shanghai International Circuit (pictured in 2018), where the race was held.

The 2010 Chinese Grand Prix was the fourth of 19 scheduled races of the 2010 Formula One World Championship and the seventh running of the event. It was held at the 16-turn 5.451 km (3.387 mi) Shanghai International Circuit in the Jiading District of Shanghai on 18 April. Tyre supplier Bridgestone brought four tyre types to the race: the soft "options" and hard "primes" dry compounds and the intermediate and full wet-weather compounds. The soft compounds were denoted by a green stripe on their side-walls; the wet compound tyres were identified by a green line at the bottom of their central groove. A total of 12 teams (each representing a different constructor) each entered two drivers for the Grand Prix with one driver entered only for the first free practice session in Paul di Resta.

Going into the race, Ferrari driver Felipe Massa led the World Drivers' Championship with 39 championship points, two ahead of his teammate Fernando Alonso in second and jointly held the position with the leading Red Bull of Sebastian Vettel, who had won the Malaysian Grand Prix two weeks earlier. Jenson Button of McLaren and Mercedes driver Nico Rosberg were tied for fourth with 35 championship points. Ferrari led the World Constructors' Championship with 76 championship points and McLaren were a further ten championship points behind in second. Red Bull were third with 61 championship points, Mercedes were fourth with 44 championship points and Renault was fifth with 30 championship points.

Button had won the Australian Grand Prix and his teammate Lewis Hamilton finished sixth in the previous two races of the season. Despite this, the McLaren team principal Martin Whitmarsh said that the team did not meet its targets but sought to establish themselves at the front of the field, "One of the greatest qualities of this team is its considerable strength in depth. After establishing a strong and solid start to the season, we're confident we'll become an even more formidable contender as we head into China and then the start of the European season." Other teams in the field predicted the team would have an advantage with the MP4-25s F-duct (a device which increases the top speed of a car by stalling the rear wing), though Hamilton said he expected Red Bull and Ferrari to challenge them, while Button stated he was uncertain whether his car would be quick enough in qualifying trim but felt it was fast for the race, "I feel that when I get to Barcelona, I'll have everything that I want to be 100 per cent. Where I am at the moment is already very good, I'm very comfortable with the car and everyone in the team."

Two weeks before the race, the governing body of motor racing, the Fédération Internationale de l'Automobile (FIA), wrote to all of the teams that any system discovered to make adjustments to the suspension and ride height of a car to achieve an aerodynamic advantage while in parc fermé conditions after the end of qualifying and before the start of a race would be outlawed under Article 34.5 of the F1 Sporting Regulations and Article 3.15 of the Technical Regulations. It came after McLaren suggested that Red Bull had used a ride height device on the RB6 at the preceding Malaysian Grand Prix, which the latter outfit denied. The team's engineering director Paddy Lowe stated that they had stopped development on its own suspension system after clarification was confirmed, "We were aware over the last few months of a different approach to it [the suspension system]; an approach which historically we hadn't thought to be the typical interpretation [of the regulations], and we were reacting to that."

Several teams made modifications to their cars in preparation for the event. Red Bull installed a small vertical exhaust duct to the rear of the RB6 to stop hot air from hitting the exhaust onto its rear wheels and better direct airflow towards the diffuser's side channel. Mercedes introduced a modified rear wing controlled by pressure sensors to feed airflow through two small openings and the back of its flap. Ferrari brought a revised aerodynamic package for the F10, which included a new frontal and curved splitter, an altered diffuser, and an extra vane to straighten the flow of air beside the splitter. During the Friday practice sessions, Alonso tested a modified rear wing, which directed air onto its flap and onto the diffuser's leading edge via a curved pipe. The Williams and Renault teams changed the end plates on both of their car's front wings as the latter constructor opted to mount small vortex generators behind the rearview mirrors to the side of the cockpit.

== Practice ==
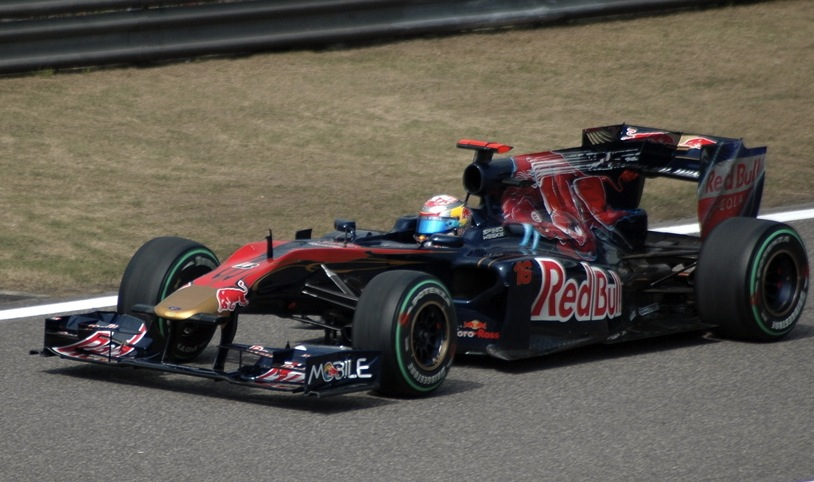
Sébastien Buemi had the front wheels shear from his Toro Rosso during the first practice session.

There were three practice sessions held in accordance with the 2010 regulations: two 90-minute sessions on Friday morning and afternoon and one 60-minute session on Saturday morning. In the first practice session, held in hazy and cold weather conditions, Button was fastest with a lap of 1:36.677, with his teammate Hamilton third. They were separated by Rosberg in second and Michael Schumacher in the other Mercedes was fourth. Vettel was fifth-fastest, ahead of the Renaults of Robert Kubica and Vitaly Petrov. Red Bull's Mark Webber, Adrian Sutil for Force India and Massa followed in eighth to tenth. Alonso stopped at the exit of turn six after 54 minutes with a right-hand exhaust bank bay fire that prevented him from recording a lap.

With ten minutes remaining, the front wheels on Sébastien Buemi's Toro Rosso sheared under braking the turn 14 hairpin due to the right-front upright failing, causing the front-right wheel to break free. The front-left wheel followed suit when its upright section was suddenly forced to bear the entire load of the front. He was pitched into a gravel trap and a barrier at high speed. Although Buemi was unhurt, the FIA race director Charlie Whiting stopped the session for debris clearing and his teammate Jaime Alguersuari was kept in the garage while the team investigated the cause of the incident. Virgin driver Timo Glock's front wing shattered and the Lotus of Jarno Trulli shed its diffuser, both through bottoming out on a bump approaching turn one.

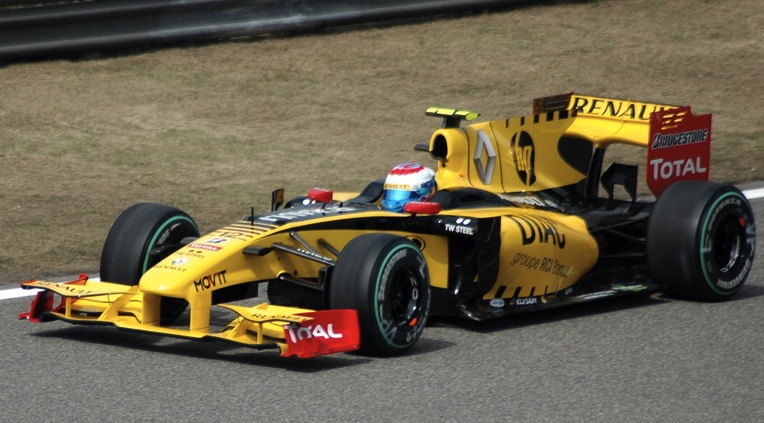
Vitaly Petrov crashed his Renault heavily at the final corner in the final practice session.

McLaren continued to run strong with Hamilton setting the day's fastest lap of 1:35.217 on the soft compound tyres in the second practice session and his teammate Button was third. The Mercedes of Rosberg and Schumacher duplicated their first practice session results in second and fourth. Vettel, Webber, Sutil, Alguersuari, Kubica and Alonso followed in the top ten. During the session, where several drivers pirouetted and ran off the circuit, Buemi was unable to set a lap time because his car was rebuilt by Toro Rosso and Heikki Kovalainen stopped his Lotus at the side of the track towards the conclusion of practice with fading oil pressure.

The final practice session was held in dry weather conditions. Hamilton set the initial pace before Webber recorded the overall fastest lap on the soft compound tyres at 1:35.323. Hamilton was second and Vettel third. Button, Alonso, Rosberg, Schumacher, Kubica, Massa and Sauber's Kamui Kobayashi completed the top ten ahead of qualifying. Though the session passed relatively peacefully, Petrov ran wide onto the artificial grass leaving the final corner and he lost control of his Renault. He skidded across a gravel trap and crashed heavily into a tyre barrier with the front of his car. Although Petrov was unhurt, Whiting stopped the session for seven minutes to allow track marshals to clear debris.

== Qualifying ==
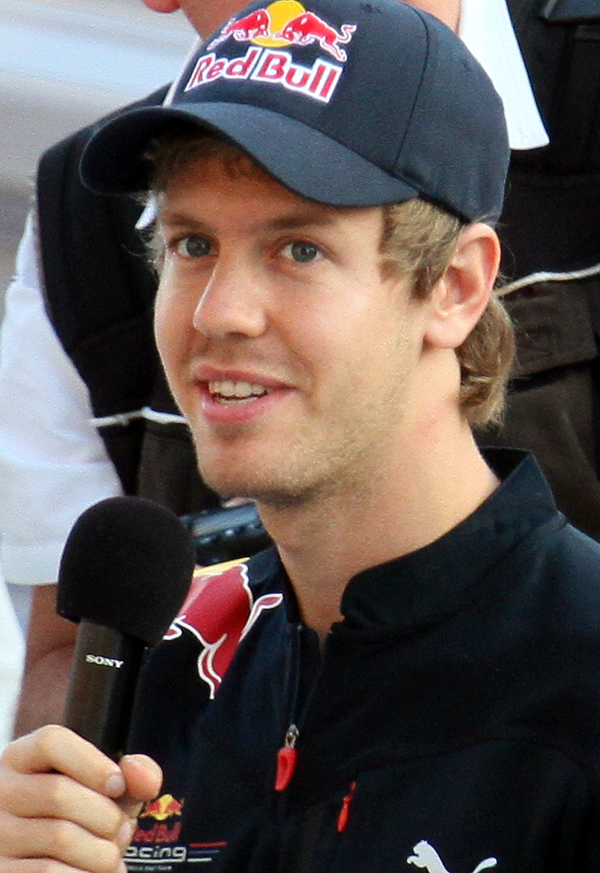
Sebastian Vettel (pictured at the Japanese Grand Prix later in the year) took his third pole position of the season and the eighth of his career.

Saturday afternoon's qualifying session was split into three parts. The first part ran for 20 minutes, eliminating cars that finished the session 18th or lower. The second part lasted 15 minutes, eliminated cars that finished 11th to 17th. The final ten-minute session determined pole position to tenth. Cars in the final session were not allowed to change tyres, using the tyres with which they set their quickest lap times. Conditions were warm and dry. Vettel altered the setup of his car to be more aligned with his teammate Webber but he struggled with its handling. Nonetheless, he went fastest in the third session to take his third pole position of the season and the eighth of his career with a time of 1:34.558 set on his final lap of qualifying. He was joined on the grid's front row by Webber, who was 0.248 seconds slower and had the pole position until Vettel's lap. Alonso felt more comfortable driving on the hard compound tyres and took third while Rosberg in fourth worked with his race engineer Jock Clear to find a setup he liked. Button, on the soft compound tyre, used an unbalanced car that required a change of differential and front wing settings put him fifth. Hamilton was fastest in the first and second sessions although car troubles in the final session left him sixth. An untidy lap and a driver error in the final corner qualified Massa seventh and Kubica was the faster of the two Renaults in eighth. Limited rear grip that slowed Schumacher in ninth and restricted his cornering ability at certain areas of the circuit. Sutil, tenth, reported oversteer in the middle sector.

Williams' Rubens Barrichello had a new engine installed after practice though he was the fastest driver not to qualify in the top ten; his fastest lap was 0.820 seconds slower than Hamilton's best time in the second session. He was followed by the Toro Rossos of Alguersuari and Buemi in 12th and 13th. After Petrov's car was repaired for qualifying, he took 14th and spoke of his belief that he had improved his driving ability through car acclimatisation. An understeer and a lack of stability under braking put Kobayashi in 15th though he was not impeded by slower traffic. Nico Hülkenberg in the second Williams ran wide at the final corner and qualified 16th. Pedro de la Rosa of the Sauber team made a driving error by locking his rear wheels on the approach to turn 14 during his final timed lap and began from 17th. Force India's Vitantonio Liuzzi failed to advance beyond the first session, having been baulked by slower traffic and unable to set a lap that represented the speed of his car. Glock was delayed by the slower Barrichello while on his first set of tyres and his sole timed lap qualified him 19th. Trulli in 20th and his teammate Kovalainen in 21st were affected by a strong tailwind that unbalanced their cars in the braking zones and Kovalainen pirouetted under braking for turn six. Lucas di Grassi of the Virgin outfit made a driver error in the final sector that lost time and put him 22nd. The Hispanias of Bruno Senna and Karun Chandhok completed the final row of the grid in 23rd and 24th, respectively.

=== Post-qualifying ===
Chandhok received a five-place grid penalty as the Hispania team broke the FIA seal on his F110's gearbox without a representative of the governing body being present; he was then further penalised for his mechanics changing a hydraulic pump assembly with parts of a different specification to the originals overnight, and was made to start from the pit lane.

=== Qualifying classification ===
The fastest lap in each of the three sessions is denoted in bold.

Pos	No.	Driver	Constructor	Q1	Q2	Q3	Grid
1	5	(Germany) Sebastian Vettel	Red Bull-Renault	1:36.317	1:35.280	**1:34.558**	1
2	6	(Australia) Mark Webber	Red Bull-Renault	1:35.978	1:35.100	1:34.806	2
3	8	(Spain) Fernando Alonso	Ferrari	1:35.987	1:35.235	1:34.913	3
4	4	(Germany) Nico Rosberg	Mercedes	1:35.952	1:35.134	1:34.923	4
5	1	(United Kingdom) Jenson Button	McLaren-Mercedes	1:36.122	1:35.443	1:34.979	5
6	2	(United Kingdom) Lewis Hamilton	McLaren-Mercedes	**1:35.641**	**1:34.928**	1:35.034	6
7	7	(Brazil) Felipe Massa	Ferrari	1:36.076	1:35.290	1:35.180	7
8	11	(Poland) Robert Kubica	Renault	1:36.348	1:35.550	1:35.364	8
9	3	(Germany) Michael Schumacher	Mercedes	1:36.484	1:35.715	1:35.646	9
10	14	(Germany) Adrian Sutil	Force India-Mercedes	1:36.671	1:35.665	1:35.963	10
11	9	(Brazil) Rubens Barrichello	Williams-Cosworth	1:36.664	1:35.748	N/A	11
12	17	(Spain) Jaime Alguersuari	Toro Rosso-Ferrari	1:36.618	1:36.047	N/A	12
13	16	(Switzerland) Sébastien Buemi	Toro Rosso-Ferrari	1:36.793	1:36.149	N/A	13
14	12	(Russia) Vitaly Petrov	Renault	1:37.031	1:36.311	N/A	14
15	23	(Japan) Kamui Kobayashi	BMW Sauber-Ferrari	1:37.044	1:36.422	N/A	15
16	10	(Germany) Nico Hülkenberg	Williams-Cosworth	1:37.049	1:36.647	N/A	16
17	22	(Spain) Pedro de la Rosa	BMW Sauber-Ferrari	1:37.050	1:37.020	N/A	17
18	15	(Italy) Vitantonio Liuzzi	Force India-Mercedes	1:37.161	N/A	N/A	18
19	24	(Germany) Timo Glock	Virgin-Cosworth	1:39.278	N/A	N/A	19
20	18	(Italy) Jarno Trulli	Lotus-Cosworth	1:39.399	N/A	N/A	20
21	19	(Finland) Heikki Kovalainen	Lotus-Cosworth	1:39.520	N/A	N/A	21
22	25	(Brazil) Lucas di Grassi	Virgin-Cosworth	1:39.783	N/A	N/A	22
23	21	(Brazil) Bruno Senna	HRT-Cosworth	1:40.469	N/A	N/A	23
24	20	(India) Karun Chandhok	HRT-Cosworth	1:40.578	N/A	N/A	PL^{1}

Notes:

- **^1** – Karun Chandhok was given a five-place grid penalty after the team broke the FIA seal on the F110's gearbox without a representative of the governing body being present. He also started from the pit lane due to a change of a hydraulic pump assembly.

== Race ==
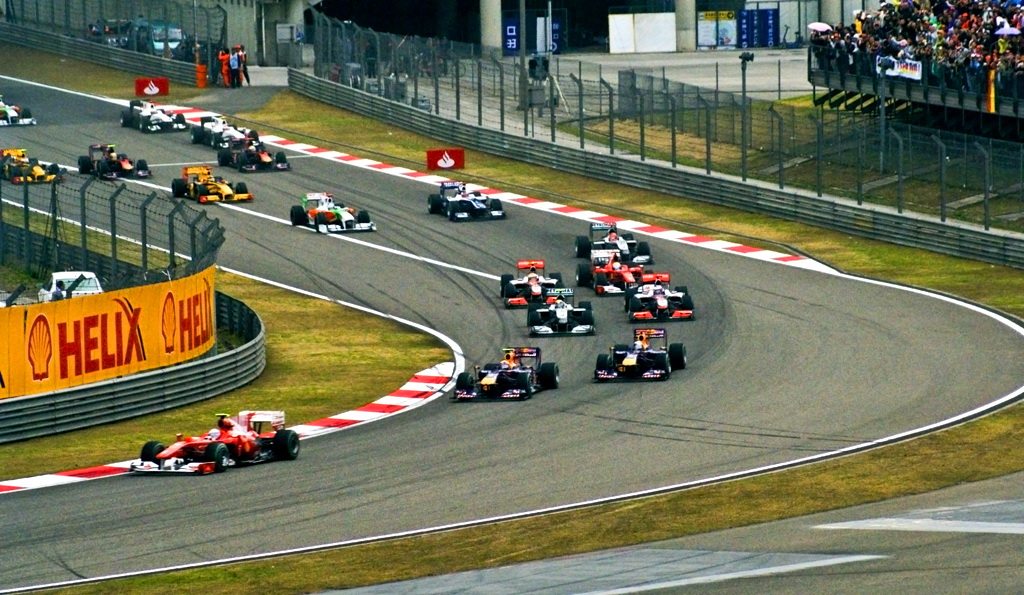
The start saw the pole position Sebastian Vettel be overtaken by teammate Mark Webber and Fernando Alonso.

The race took place before 85,000 spectators in the afternoon from 15:00 China Standard Time (UTC+08:00). Weather conditions at the start were cloudy, with rain falling on the circuit with increasing intensity 30 minutes before the formation lap. The air temperature was between 18 and 21 °C (64 and 70 °F), and the track temperature ranged from 17 to 23 °C (63 to 73 °F). Buemi modified his Toro Rosso's setup to optimise it for the wet conditions while Ferrari opted for a high-downforce setup for the anticipated rain shower. Glock's car was stationary on its front jacks due to a sudden loss of air pressure in the engine valve system, which was traced to a chassis fault. He was retired in the garage after it was determined that repairs were not feasible. Glock's teammate Di Grassi had a malfunctioning clutch that necessitated its replacement and he began from the pit lane. Alonso made a fast getaway and passed the Red Bulls to lead the field on the approach to the first corner as Webber moved past his teammate Vettel for second. At turn six, a three-car accident prompted the deployment of the safety car. Liuzzi lost control of his car under braking and he slid backwards into the cars of Kobayashi and Buemi.

Several drivers, including Alonso, made pit stops for the intermediate compound tyres at the end of the second lap due to the intensifying rain. Rosberg, Button and the Renaults of Kubica and Petrov chose to remain on the circuit and the former led the field back to racing speed when the safety car was withdrawn at the end of lap three. On the lap after, Kovalainen in seventh was passed by the eighth-placed Barrichello driving towards turn six. As Rosberg continued to pull away from Button on lap five, the stewards informed the Ferrari team that Alonso had jumped the start, for which he incurred a drive-through penalty. He took the penalty on the next lap and rejoined the race in 14th. Although the intermediate tyres initially provided an increase in speed, the rain did not intensify and every driver running on them made a second pit stop, providing Rosberg, Button, Kubica and Petrov with a significant lead over the rest of the field. During this period, Hamilton got wheelspin and slewed sideways as he exited his pit stall alongside Vettel. The two made contact as the latter turned right and Hamilton veered close to the Williams mechanics before going behind Vettel. Webber damaged the front wing after he hit the front jack. The incident cost him nine seconds and dropped him to tenth. On lap nine, Hamilton passed Barrichello for 12th at turn one. De la Rosa in fourth pulled off to the side of the track on the same lap to retire with an engine failure.

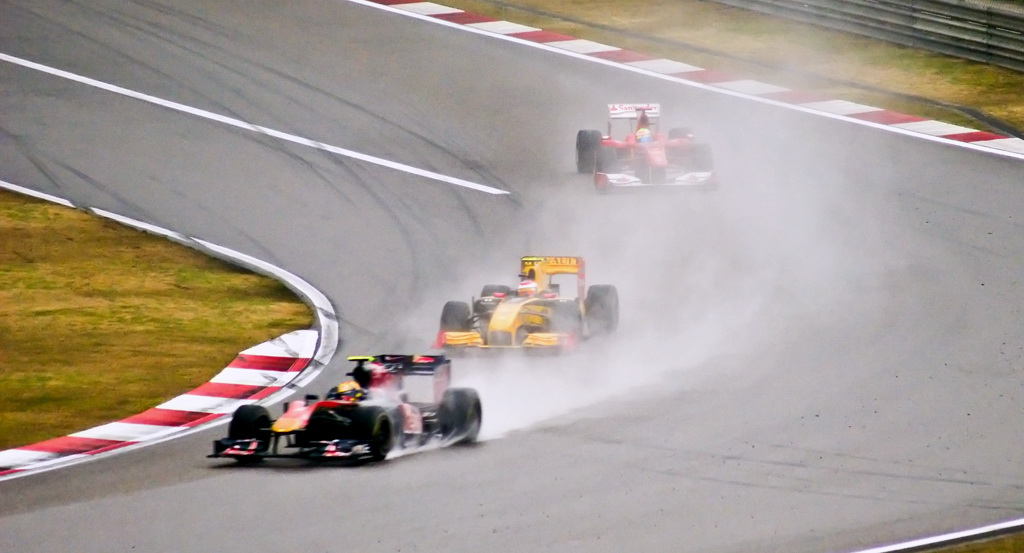
The race saw rain, and most of it was run on the intermediate compound tyres.

Webber was overtaken by his teammate Vettel on the back straight into the turn 14 hairpin for eighth on lap 11 and lost a further position to Hamilton on the lap after. The two drivers passed Kovalainen soon after. On lap 13, Vettel attempted to pass Sutil for seventh at the same corner though Hamilton got past the two on the inside line. Sutil delayed Vettel until the latter clung onto his slipstream before making a pass on the inside line driving towards the turn 14 hairpin. On the 15th lap, Schumacher was caught by Hamilton at a rate of three seconds per lap, and Hamilton tried a pass on the inside at turn 14 but Schumacher defended the position. Hamilton tried again at the same turn on the next lap but Schumacher again kept fifth on the inside line. During lap 17, Hamilton made a third try by achieving a fast exit leaving turn 13 and slipstreamed up the back of Schumacher on the backstraight and withstood the Mercedes driver's attempt to keep fifth. Further back, Alguersuari overtook Sutil on the outside at the turn 14 hairpin to take ninth as the two made contact leaving the turn. At the front, Rosberg's lead of 4.5 seconds became nothing when Button closed up to him. He ran wide at turn 11 and Button made the pass for the lead at the turn 14 hairpin on lap 19.

Rain began to fall heavier on lap 20. The leading trio of Button, Rosberg and Kubica made pit stops and switched to the intermediate tyres on the following lap. Their advantage – Petrov gradually fell off the pace to be within striking distance of the more experienced competitors – was negated when Alguersuari had an encounter with an Hispania car that damaged his front wing. As he made a pit stop for a new nose cone, the wing fell off, scattering debris across the circuit and triggering the second deployment of the safety car on lap 22. During the safety car period, Massa was slow exiting the turn 14 hairpin. His teammate Alonso passed him on the outside and caused Massa to run into the grass to avoid his teammate and enter the pit lane. When the safety car withdrew at the end of lap 25, Button controlled the field between the safety car's exit and the start/finish line. Button slowed to a near halt at the bottom hairpin, bunching the field up and causing controversy when Webber ran off the circuit at the final bend. As the lead driver has the right to drive as fast or as slow as he chooses when he gains control of the race, no action was taken. Webber fell from sixth to 11th. Hamilton overtook Schumacher at turn eight on lap 26 and then Petrov at the same corner on the next lap.

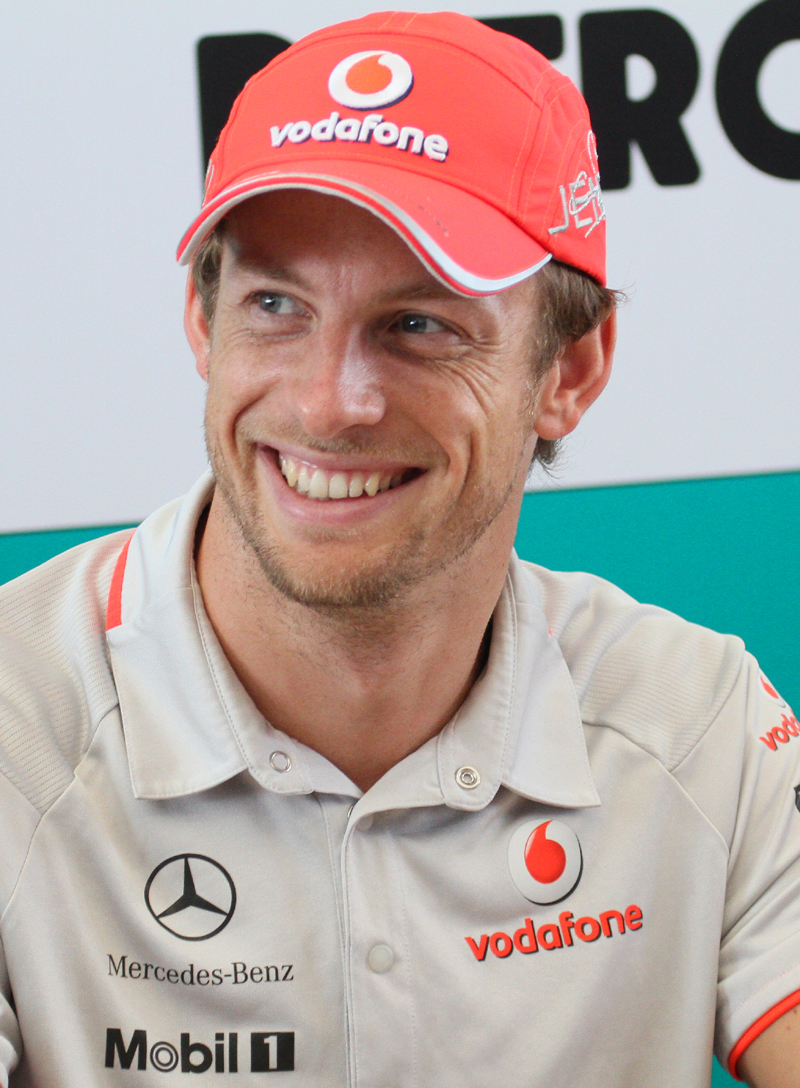
Jenson Button (pictured at the preceding Malaysian Grand Prix) won his second race of the season and the ninth of his career.

On the 29th lap, Hamilton closed up to Kubica and overtook him on the outside going into the turn 14 hairpin for third. Alonso passed Sutil for sixth soon after at the same corner. Two laps later, Barrichello lost 11th to Webber on the inside of turn six. Rosberg's tyres began to degrade on lap 32 as well as Hamilton's though his team told him to remain on the track because more rain was forecast later in the Grand Prix. On the following lap, Petrov had an oversteer that caused him to pirouette leaving turn eighth. He fell from fifth to seventh, behind Alonso and Vettel. The pace began to lower on the intermediate tyres by the 34th lap as they continued to degrade. Hamilton closed up to Rosberg and attempted a pass on the outside on the Mercedes driver at the turn 14 hairpin but Rosberg held the position. On lap 36, Hamilton tried again, this time going into turn eight, and overtook at turn nine before Rosberg came back to retain second at the exit of turn 10. The final round of pit stops for intermediate tyres took place from the same lap to the 38th lap, and Hamilton moved ahead of Rosberg. Similarly, Alonso passed Kubica. The final phase of the race was run under increasingly heavy rain across the back part of the circuit, as a dry line began to appear along the main straight.

Alguersuari attempted to keep Petrov and Massa behind him though Petrov overtook Alguersuari at the turn 14 hairpin and Massa passed the Spaniard at the final corner on lap 45. At the front, Button increased his advantage over his teammate Hamilton to 9.5 seconds but it was reduced to 5.3 seconds when he ran deep at the turn 14 hairpin six laps later. On lap 52, Petrov overtook Schumacher on the outside for eighth at the turn 14 hairpin. Massa drew close to Schumacher on the next lap. He slipstreamed the Mercedes and moved to the outside on the approach to the turn 14 hairpin but Schumacher defended his line and kept ninth. On the 55th lap, Webber slid going into turn 12 and it allowed Petrov to pass him for seventh place. Massa tried again to get past Schumacher and was successful that time round, withstanding Schumacher's attempt to retain his hold on ninth to get ahead leaving the turn 14 hairpin because of better traction from his car as Schumacher ran wide onto the artificial grass at the final corner.

Rain began to fall heavily on the final lap. Button and Hamilton closed up though they elected to be conservative and Button crossed the finish line after the 56th lap to take his second victory of the season and the ninth of his career. Hamilton was 1.530 seconds behind in second to claim the first one–two finish for British drivers since Eddie Irvine and David Coulthard at the 1999 Austrian Grand Prix and the first for Englishmen since Graham Hill and Piers Courage in the 1969 Monaco Grand Prix. Rosberg completed the podium finishers in third to complete a sweep of the podium for Mercedes-powered cars for the first time since the 1955 British Grand Prix. Off the podium, Alonso followed in fourth, Kubica fifth and Vettel sixth. Petrov finished seventh to score his first Formula One championship points and the first for a Russian driver in the championship. Webber, Massa and Schumacher completed the top ten. Sutil, Barrichello followed close behind in 11th and 12th with Alguersuari, Kovalainen, Hülkenberg, Senna and Chandhok the final classified finishers. Of the other retirements, Di Grassi completed eight laps before retiring and Trulli stopped his Lotus in the garage with a hydraulics failure.

=== Post-race ===
The top three drivers appeared on the podium to collect their trophies and spoke to the media in a later press conference. Button hailed the win as "my best victory" and emphasised the importance of changing to the intermediate tyres during the safety car early in the Grand Prix, "That made the race. If we didn’t have that safety car later on for debris we would have been a long... well, I don’t know, I don’t know how quick Lewis was in the race. But the safety car definitely helped the situation for people that stopped for inters." Hamilton called his race "quite eventful" and congratulated his teammate Button on taking the victory, "But it was very tough. Obviously at the beginning with the weather it wasn’t easy making the call or when to change the tyres. I chose very, very late, when I was half-way round the last corner and clearly it wasn’t the right choice." Rosberg spoke of how comfortable he felt in the environment of the Mercedes team and how they aided in his integration, "We have had a good step forward again this weekend. We had some upgrades for this track, very small actually, so we have a lot more to come, so it is quite promising for us."

The Ferrari team principal Stefano Domenicali made the incident between Alonso and Massa entering the pit lane on lap 22 less important and called it "a racing incident", adding, "We only saw it afterwards on the television replay. There is absolutely no problem between the two drivers. When you are always racing to win, you can have moments like this." Massa said he was unsure whether Alonso went beyond the sporting regulations, "He was inside so there was nothing I could do there. In terms of the rules, I don't know. I think he should be okay because we saw another car doing the same. You need to ask Charlie [Whiting] not me." Alonso stated he felt the manoeuvre was uncontroversial, "I knew that when two team-mates are fighting there are rumours. If it was two different cars there wouldn't be a problem. I think Felipe had too much wheel-spin on the final corner and I had a bit of an advantage in the pitlane entry." Both drivers later responded on the Ferrari website in a post called "media polemics" to reports carried in the press about a potential conflict. They said that no such dispute between the two existed, something that senior Ferrari personnel, including Domenicali and the president Luca di Montezemolo, confirmed.

The Renault team principal Éric Boullier praised Petrov's pace and remaining calm under pressure on the wet track, and spoke of his belief that the manufacturer's first double-points finish was indicative of their aggressive development plan. Conversely, Webber commented that the pace of the Red Bulls was not enough to challenge McLaren, "We got blown away, it was a difficult grand prix. We weren't quick enough. We know [why the car falters in the wet conditions] and we have to improve it." Schumacher was philosophical to have finished in tenth, saying his tyre strategy caused him to lose pace in the final ten laps but he was pleased to duel other drivers, "Today was one of those races that you do not want to remember, just like the whole weekend really. It was not good for me and it not good from me. You have to take it as another experience and accept it, even if it is frustrating that I was not able to get my tyres together better." Kubica felt he could have achieved a finish on the podium had the safety car not been deployed as it lost him a large amount of time, "So although I'm happy to finish fifth, I still feel a bit frustrated to have missed a podium."

The race stewards summoned Hamilton and Vettel to discuss the clash of wheels in the pit lane on lap five and review television footage of the incident. Both drivers were issued with a reprimand for "dangerous driving". Hamilton said of the incident, "As far as I'm concerned I'm OK. The team waited for quite some time and released me when they thought it was right. I got quite a lot of wheelspin and struggled to get out of the box. As I came out I noticed Sebastian was there." Vettel stated he did not understand why Hamilton was released alongside him, adding, "I don't know why he was keen to touch me." Button's win promoted him to the lead of the World Drivers' Championship for the first time in the season with 60 championship points, and Rosberg was ten championship points behind in second. Alonso fell to third and tied with Hamilton for the position. Vettel's sixth-place finish dropped him from second to fifth with 45 championship points. In the World Constructors' Championship, McLaren overtook Ferrari to lead the standings. Red Bull retained third while Mercedes and Renault were fourth and fifth with 15 races remaining in the season.

=== Race classification ===
Drivers who scored championship points are denoted in bold.

Pos	No.	Driver	Constructor	Laps	Time/Retired	Grid	Points
1	1	(United Kingdom) **Jenson Button**	**McLaren-Mercedes**	56	1:46:42.163	5	25
2	2	(United Kingdom) **Lewis Hamilton**	**McLaren-Mercedes**	56	+1.530	6	18
3	4	(Germany) **Nico Rosberg**	**Mercedes**	56	+9.484	4	15
4	8	(Spain) **Fernando Alonso**	**Ferrari**	56	+11.869	3	12
5	11	(Poland) **Robert Kubica**	**Renault**	56	+22.213	8	10
6	5	(Germany) **Sebastian Vettel**	**Red Bull-Renault**	56	+33.310	1	8
7	12	(Russia) **Vitaly Petrov**	**Renault**	56	+47.600	14	6
8	6	(Australia) **Mark Webber**	**Red Bull-Renault**	56	+52.172	2	4
9	7	(Brazil) **Felipe Massa**	**Ferrari**	56	+57.796	7	2
10	3	(Germany) **Michael Schumacher**	**Mercedes**	56	+1:01.749	9	1
11	14	(Germany) Adrian Sutil	Force India-Mercedes	56	+1:02.874	10	
12	9	(Brazil) Rubens Barrichello	Williams-Cosworth	56	+1:03.665	11	
13	17	(Spain) Jaime Alguersuari	Toro Rosso-Ferrari	56	+1:11.416	12	
14	19	(Finland) Heikki Kovalainen	Lotus-Cosworth	55	+1 Lap	21	
15	10	(Germany) Nico Hülkenberg	Williams-Cosworth	55	+1 Lap	16	
16	21	(Brazil) Bruno Senna	HRT-Cosworth	54	+2 Laps	23	
17	20	(India) Karun Chandhok	HRT-Cosworth	52	+4 Laps	PL	
Ret	18	(Italy) Jarno Trulli	Lotus-Cosworth	26	Hydraulics	20	
Ret	25	(Brazil) Lucas di Grassi	Virgin-Cosworth	8	Clutch	22	
Ret	22	(Spain) Pedro de la Rosa	BMW Sauber-Ferrari	7	Engine	17	
Ret	16	(Switzerland) Sébastien Buemi	Toro Rosso-Ferrari	0	Collision	13	
Ret	23	(Japan) Kamui Kobayashi	BMW Sauber-Ferrari	0	Collision	15	
Ret	15	(Italy) Vitantonio Liuzzi	Force India-Mercedes	0	Collision	18	
DNS	24	(Germany) Timo Glock	Virgin-Cosworth	0	Engine	19	

== Championship standings after the race ==
Drivers' Championship standings

–/+	Pos.	Driver	Points
3	1	(United Kingdom) Jenson Button	60
3	2	(Germany) Nico Rosberg	50
1	3	(Spain) Fernando Alonso	49
2	4	(United Kingdom) Lewis Hamilton	49
3	5	(Germany) Sebastian Vettel	45

Constructors' Championship standings

–/+	Pos.	Constructor	Points
1	1	(United Kingdom) McLaren-Mercedes	109
1	2	(Italy) Ferrari	90
	3	(Austria) Red Bull-Renault	73
	4	(Germany) Mercedes	60
	5	(France) Renault	46
Sources:

- Note: Only the top five positions are included for both sets of standings.

== Explanatory notes ==
Previous race: 2010 Malaysian Grand Prix	FIA Formula One World Championship; 2010 season	Next race: 2010 Spanish Grand Prix
Previous race: 2009 Chinese Grand Prix	Chinese Grand Prix	Next race: 2011 Chinese Grand Prix
