= Rain tyre =

Tyres used in wet weather

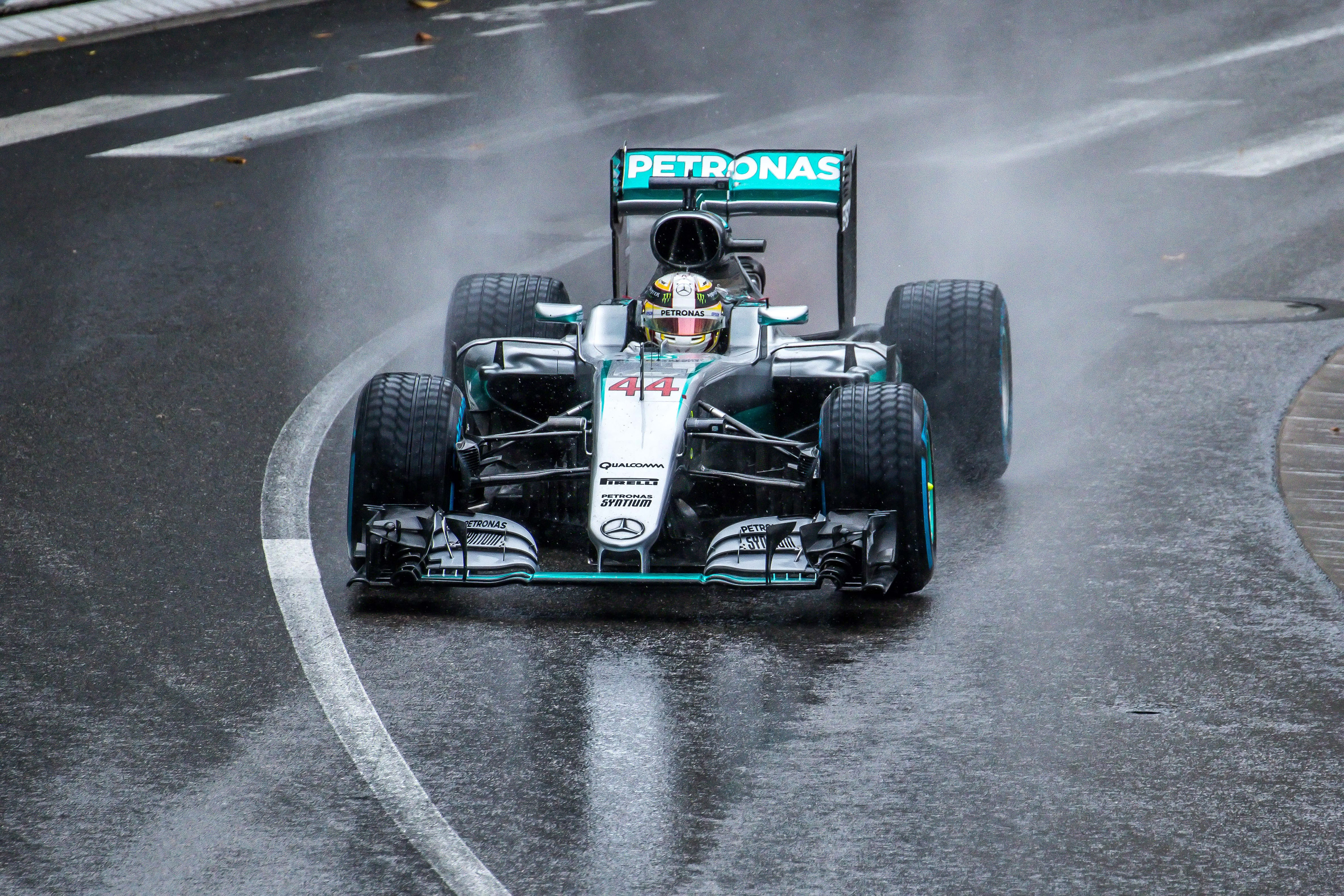
Lewis Hamilton competes through the rain at the 2016 Monaco Grand Prix using rain tyres.

A rain tyre or wet tyre (rain tire or wet tire in American English) is a racing tyre used in motorsport in wet weather or wet tracks as opposed to a slick tyre used in dry conditions. It is very similar in many ways to the tyres found on normal road cars.

Rain tyres are not used in NASCAR, ARCA and INDYCAR sanctioned races held on oval tracks as these races are invariably halted when the track is wet due to safety concerns regarding the large amounts of spray involved reducing visibility, as well as a lack of traction in banked corners at high speeds.

== Structure ==
Rain tyres have a specially designed structure making them better adapted for their application than any other tyres. However, not all rain tyres obey the same design principles. Certain factors need to be taken into account when designing a good rain tyre, such as the:

- Speed of the car
- Weight of the car
- Power of the car
- Lifespan of the tyre

=== Grooves ===
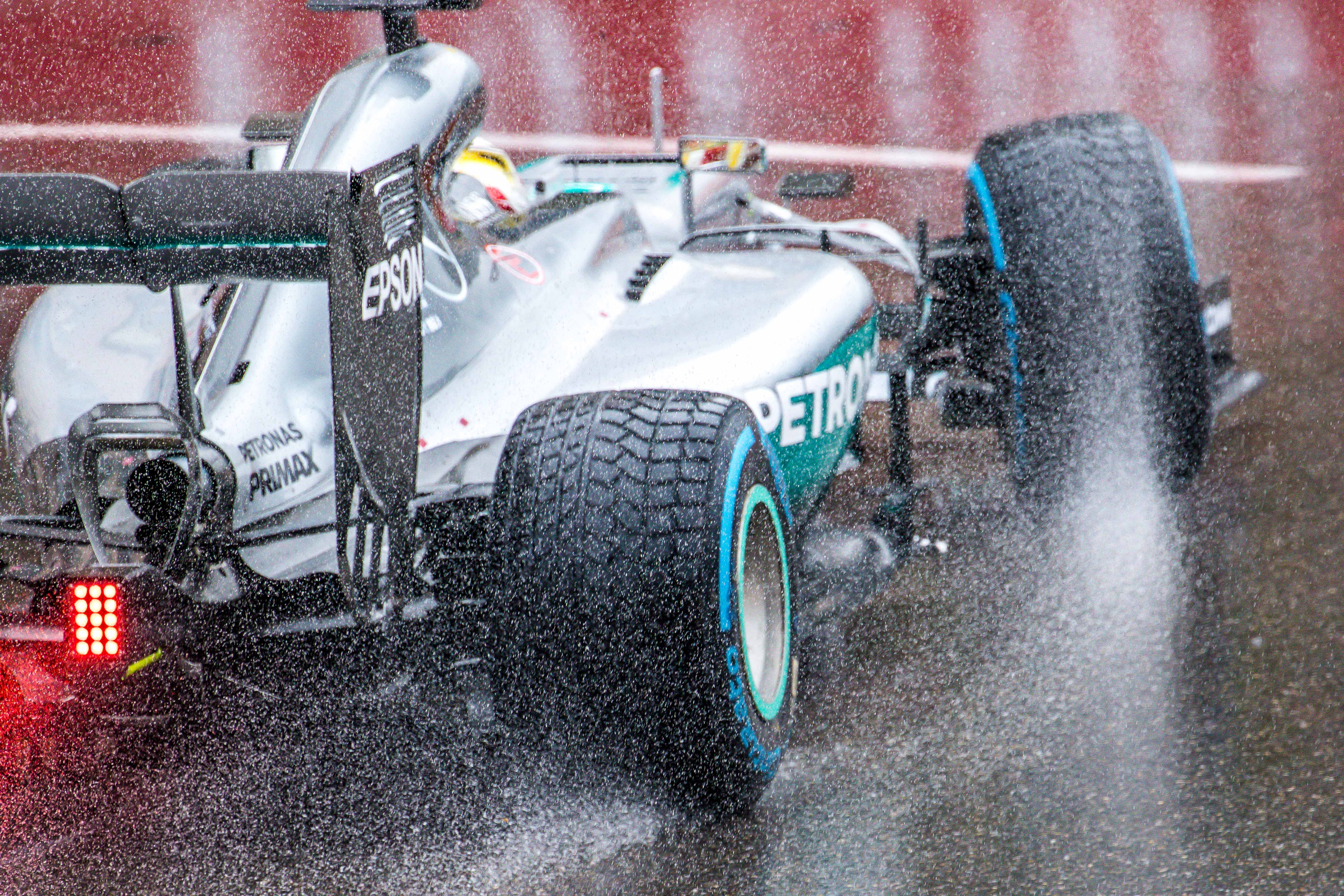
Detailed view of rain tyres equipped by Lewis Hamilton at the 2016 Monaco Grand Prix

Rain tyres are cut or moulded with patterned grooves or tread in them. This allows the tyre to quickly displace the water between the ground and the rubber on the tyre. If this water is not displaced, the car will experience an effect known as hydroplaning as the rubber will not be in contact with the ground. These grooves do not help the car grip contrary to popular belief, however if these grooves are too shallow, the grip will be impaired in wet conditions as the rubber will not be able to make good contact with the ground. The patterns are designed to displace water as quickly as possible to the edges of the tyre or into specially cut channels in the centre of the tyre. Not all groove patterns are the same. Optimal patterns depend on the car and the conditions. The grooves are also designed to generate heat when lateral forces are applied to the tyre.

=== Rubber ===
Rain tyres are also made from softer rubber compounds to help the car grip in the slippery conditions and to build up heat in the tyre. These tyres are so soft that running them on a dry track would cause them to deteriorate within minutes. Softer rubber means that the rubber contains more oils and other chemicals which cause a racing tyre to become sticky when it is hot. The softer a tyre, the stickier it becomes, and conversely with hard tyres.

When rain has stopped falling, and a track is in the process of drying, it is not unusual to see drivers intentionally driving through wet puddles and damp portions of the course, in order to cool the rubber and stave off tyre deterioration. As soon as possible, drivers will revert to slick tyres to maintain competitive speeds.

=== Shape ===
Currently, F1 rain tyres have a larger diameter than dry tyres, with the wets having a diameter of 10mm more than the slicks. This increases the ride height of the car and makes it less vulnerable to aquaplaning.

Sometimes rain tyres are designed to have a smaller diameter than their dry counterparts. This means that the wheel spins faster and more water is thrown off the tyre by overcoming centripetal force. Some rain tyres are also narrower than the dry counterparts. This smaller "footprint" reduces the chances of hydroplaning.

== Intermediate tyres ==
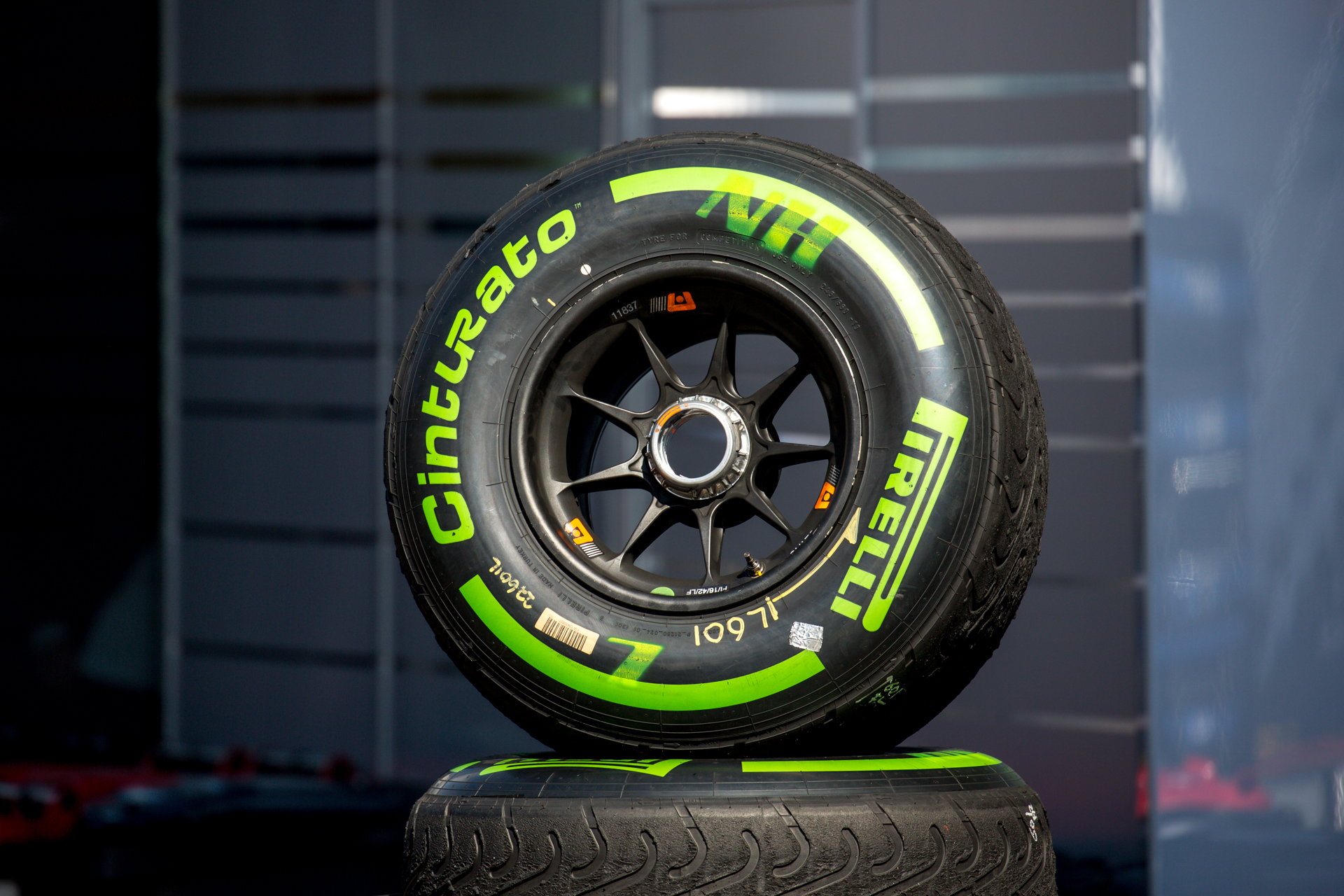
Intermediate tyre by Pirelli at the 2016 Austrian Grand Prix

Some racing series such as Formula One allow an intermediate (inter) tyre. This tyre is designed to be used in conditions too wet for slick tyres and too dry for wet tyres. They are made with rubber compounds slightly softer than slick tyres and are cut with grooves like the rain tyre but shallower to prevent excessive heat build up. Former Formula One tyre supplier Bridgestone referred to the "intermediate" tyre as the "wet" tyre, and to what are known as "full wets" as "monsoon tyres".

== Invention ==
The original invention of the rain tyre is attributed to Uniroyal, in 1969. They were the first to understand the water-deflecting properties of directional V-shaped tread and the first to use biomimicry with the development of “Shark Skin Technology”, which helps to prevent aquaplaning.
