= 2018 British Grand Prix =

10th round of the 2018 Formula One season

Race 10 of 21 in the 2018 Formula One World Championship
← Previous race	Next race →
- Layout of the Silverstone Circuit

Race details
- Date: 8 July 2018
- Official name: Formula 1 2018 Rolex British Grand Prix
- Location: Silverstone Circuit; Silverstone, United Kingdom
- Course: Permanent racing facility
- Course length: 5.891 km (3.660 miles)
- Distance: 52 laps, 306.198 km (190.263 miles)
- Weather: Sunny 27.0 °C (80.6 °F)
- Attendance: 340,000 (race weekend); 140,500 (race)

Pole position
Driver	(United Kingdom) Lewis Hamilton	Mercedes
- Time: 1:25.892

Fastest lap
Driver	(Germany) Sebastian Vettel	Ferrari
- Time: 1:30.696 on lap 47

Podium
First	(Germany) Sebastian Vettel	Ferrari
Second	(United Kingdom) Lewis Hamilton	Mercedes
Third	(Finland) Kimi Räikkönen	Ferrari

The 2018 British Grand Prix (formally known as the Formula 1 2018 Rolex British Grand Prix) was a Formula One motor race held on 8 July 2018 at the Silverstone Circuit in Silverstone, United Kingdom. The race was the 10th round of the 2018 Formula One World Championship. It marked the 73rd running of the British Grand Prix, the 69th time that the race had been run as a World Championship event, and the 52nd time that the World Championship event had been held at the Silverstone Circuit.

Ferrari driver Sebastian Vettel entered the race with a one-point lead over Lewis Hamilton in the Drivers' Championship. In the Constructors' Championship, Ferrari led Mercedes by ten points.

== Report ==
=== Background ===
The circuit featured three drag reduction system (DRS) zones. The two used in previous years – positioned on the Wellington and Hangar Straights – returned, with a third zone placed on the pit straight. As DRS is deactivated when the driver brakes, drivers were able to use the system through the Abbey and Farm corners as these corners could be taken flat-out when the car is low on fuel. This brought increased risk as DRS reduces drag by cancelling out aerodynamic grip at a time when aerodynamic grip improves the car's ability to take corners at speed. Drivers were able to manually deactivate DRS before the corners if they were unable or unwilling to take the corner with the use of DRS. The race marked the first time that drivers were able to use DRS through corners in a race. The decision to allow the use of DRS through the corners drew criticism as drivers felt that using DRS through Abbey corner was unsafe. Drivers found the best approach was to manually deactivate DRS before the corner without slowing before reactivating it on the corner exit. This approach was necessary as slowing the car would prevent the system from being reactivated.

=== Practice ===
The first practice session saw Romain Grosjean crash at Abbey, after he left his DRS open whilst taking the corner, and Max Verstappen stopped on the pit straight with a gearbox issue. In second practice, Verstappen crashed at Luffield and Pierre Gasly's Toro Rosso broke down. In third practice, Brendon Hartley had a heavy crash after his front left suspension failed at high speed.

=== Qualifying ===
Q1 was red flagged as Lance Stroll went into the gravel and his car had to be removed. After an early showing from Ferrari, Hamilton took pole, his 6th around Silverstone. Ferrari qualified 2nd and 3rd, with Valtteri Bottas 4th. Hartley missed qualifying after the heavy crash in FP3, and started from the pit lane, along with Stroll and Sergey Sirotkin. Charles Leclerc made Q3 for the second time, qualifying in P9.

=== Race ===
Hamilton had a slow start and was jumped by Vettel and Bottas. At Turn 3, Kimi Räikkönen made contact with Hamilton, spinning him off the track and into last. Sergio Pérez also spun at the start, narrowly avoiding the Williams cars exiting the pit lane. Hartley failed to exit the pit lane. Räikkönen was given a 10-second time penalty for causing the collision between himself and Hamilton, which he served in the pits on lap 14. On lap 19, Leclerc retired after exiting the pits with a loose wheel. On lap 32, Marcus Ericsson crashed at Abbey, after failing to deactivate his DRS quick enough. This brought out a safety car, and both Ferraris and both Red Bulls pitted for a 2nd time, for the soft tyres. Mercedes chose to leave their drivers out to gain track position. On lap 38, Grosjean and Carlos Sainz crashed at Copse, causing another safety car. On lap 46, Verstappen spun and subsequently retired with a brake by wire issue. The next lap, Vettel overtook Bottas for the lead of the race, which he kept until the chequered flag, making it his second victory at Silverstone, the first since 2009. Vettel became the first Ferrari driver to win at Silverstone since Fernando Alonso in 2011. Vettel's win broke Mercedes's 5-race winning streak at the British Grand Prix.

== Classification ==
=== Qualifying ===
Pos.	Car no.	Driver	Constructor	Qualifying times			Final grid
Pos.	Car no.	Driver	Constructor	Q1	Q2	Q3	Final grid
1	44	(United Kingdom) Lewis Hamilton	Mercedes	1:26.818	1:26.256	1:25.892	1
2	5	(Germany) Sebastian Vettel	Ferrari	1:26.585	1:26.372	1:25.936	2
3	7	(Finland) Kimi Räikkönen	Ferrari	1:27.549	1:26.483	1:25.990	3
4	77	(Finland) Valtteri Bottas	Mercedes	1:27.025	1:26.413	1:26.217	4
5	33	(Netherlands) Max Verstappen	Red Bull Racing-TAG Heuer	1:27.309	1:27.013	1:26.602	5
6	3	(Australia) Daniel Ricciardo	Red Bull Racing-TAG Heuer	1:27.979	1:27.369	1:27.099	6
7	20	(Denmark) Kevin Magnussen	Haas-Ferrari	1:28.143	1:27.730	1:27.244	7
8	8	(France) Romain Grosjean	Haas-Ferrari	1:28.086	1:27.522	1:27.455	8
9	16	(Monaco) Charles Leclerc	Sauber-Ferrari	1:27.962	1:27.790	1:27.879	9
10	31	(France) Esteban Ocon	Force India-Mercedes	1:28.279	1:27.843	1:28.194	10
11	27	(Germany) Nico Hülkenberg	Renault	1:28.017	1:27.901		11
12	11	(Mexico) Sergio Pérez	Force India-Mercedes	1:28.210	1:27.928		12
13	14	(Spain) Fernando Alonso	McLaren-Renault	1:28.187	1:28.139		13
14	10	(France) Pierre Gasly	Scuderia Toro Rosso-Honda	1:28.399	1:28.343		14
15	9	(Sweden) Marcus Ericsson	Sauber-Ferrari	1:28.249	1:28.391		15
16	55	(Spain) Carlos Sainz Jr.	Renault	1:28.456			16
17	2	(Belgium) Stoffel Vandoorne	McLaren-Renault	1:29.096			17
18	35	(Russia) Sergey Sirotkin	Williams-Mercedes	1:29.252			PL^{1}
107% time: 1:32.645
—	18	(Canada) Lance Stroll	Williams-Mercedes	No time			PL^{2}
—	28	(New Zealand) Brendon Hartley	Scuderia Toro Rosso-Honda	No time			PL^{3}

Notes

- ^1 – Sergey Sirotkin was required to start from the pit lane after changing his rear wing.
- ^2 – Lance Stroll failed to set a lap time during qualifying. He was allowed to race at the stewards' discretion. He was required to start from the pit lane after changing his rear wing.
- ^3 – Brendon Hartley did not take part in qualifying after crashing in FP3. He was allowed to race at the stewards' discretion. He was required to start from the pit lane after changing his chassis.

=== Race ===
Pos.	No.	Driver	Constructor	Laps	Time/Retired	Grid	Points
1	5	(Germany) Sebastian Vettel	Ferrari	52	1:27:29.784	2	25
2	44	(United Kingdom) Lewis Hamilton	Mercedes	52	+2.264	1	18
3	7	(Finland) Kimi Räikkönen	Ferrari	52	+3.652	3	15
4	77	(Finland) Valtteri Bottas	Mercedes	52	+8.883	4	12
5	3	(Australia) Daniel Ricciardo	Red Bull Racing-TAG Heuer	52	+9.500	6	10
6	27	(Germany) Nico Hülkenberg	Renault	52	+28.220	11	8
7	31	(France) Esteban Ocon	Force India-Mercedes	52	+29.930	10	6
8	14	(Spain) Fernando Alonso	McLaren-Renault	52	+31.115	13	4
9	20	(Denmark) Kevin Magnussen	Haas-Ferrari	52	+33.188	7	2
10	11	(Mexico) Sergio Pérez	Force India-Mercedes	52	+34.708	12	1
11	2	(Belgium) Stoffel Vandoorne	McLaren-Renault	52	+35.774	17	
12	18	(Canada) Lance Stroll	Williams-Mercedes	52	+38.106	PL	
13	10	(France) Pierre Gasly	Scuderia Toro Rosso-Honda	52	+39.129^{1}	14	
14	35	(Russia) Sergey Sirotkin	Williams-Mercedes	52	+48.113	PL	
15^{2}	33	(Netherlands) Max Verstappen	Red Bull Racing-TAG Heuer	46	Brakes	5	
Ret	8	(France) Romain Grosjean	Haas-Ferrari	37	Collision	8	
Ret	55	(Spain) Carlos Sainz Jr.	Renault	37	Collision	16	
Ret	9	(Sweden) Marcus Ericsson	Sauber-Ferrari	31	Accident	15	
Ret	16	(Monaco) Charles Leclerc	Sauber-Ferrari	18	Wheel	9	
Ret	28	(New Zealand) Brendon Hartley	Scuderia Toro Rosso-Honda	1	PU connector	PL	

Notes

- ^1 – Pierre Gasly originally finished 10th, but received a 5-second penalty for causing a collision with Sergio Pérez.
- ^2 – Max Verstappen retired from the race, but was classified as he completed more than 90% of the race distance.

== Championship standings after the race ==
Drivers' Championship standings

	Pos.	Driver	Points
	1	(Germany) Sebastian Vettel	171
	2	(United Kingdom) Lewis Hamilton	163
	3	(Finland) Kimi Räikkönen	116
	4	(Australia) Daniel Ricciardo	106
1	5	(Finland) Valtteri Bottas	104

Constructors' Championship standings

Pos.	Constructor	Points
1	(Italy) Ferrari	287
2	(Germany) Mercedes	267
3	(Austria) Red Bull Racing-TAG Heuer	199
4	(France) Renault	70
5	(United States) Haas-Ferrari	51

- Note: Only the top five positions are included for both sets of standings.

== See also ==
- 2018 Silverstone Formula 2 round
- 2018 Silverstone GP3 Series round

Previous race: 2018 Austrian Grand Prix	FIA Formula One World Championship; 2018 season	Next race: 2018 German Grand Prix
Previous race: 2017 British Grand Prix	British Grand Prix	Next race: 2019 British Grand Prix
