= 2018 Formula One World Championship =

69th season of FIA Formula One World Championship

Defending Champion Lewis Hamilton won his fifth of seven World Drivers' Championships, his second in a row.

Four-time Champion Sebastian Vettel was runner-up, driving for Ferrari.

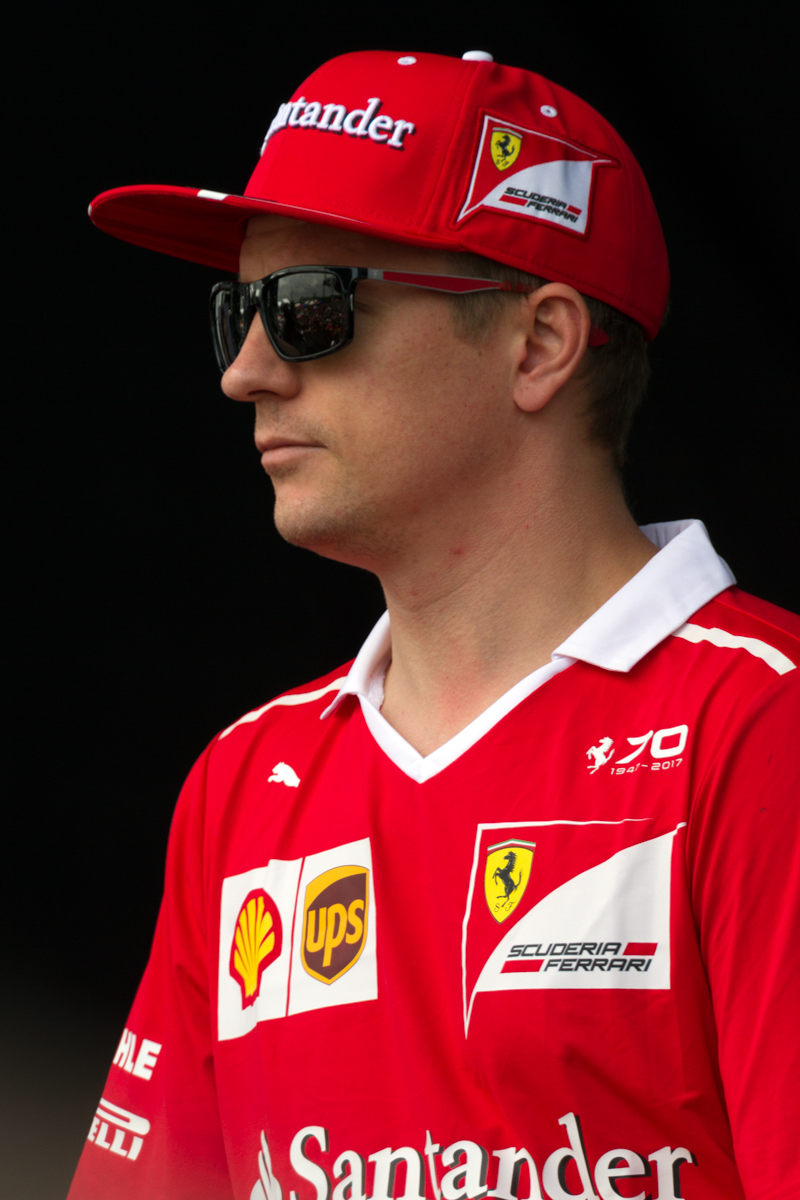
2007 Champion Kimi Räikkönen finished the season in third place, in his final season for Ferrari.

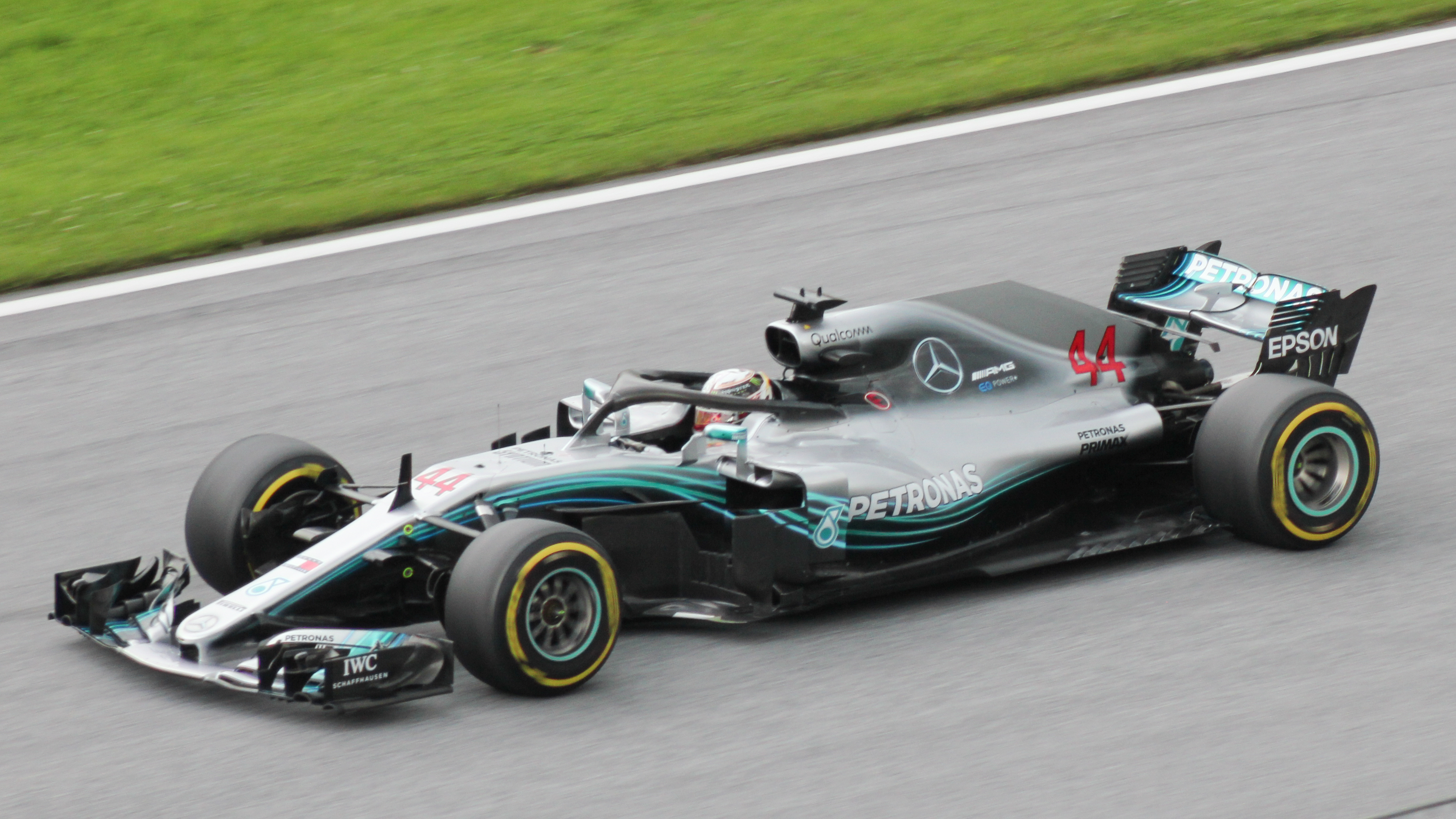
Mercedes retained the Constructors' Championship for a fifth consecutive year

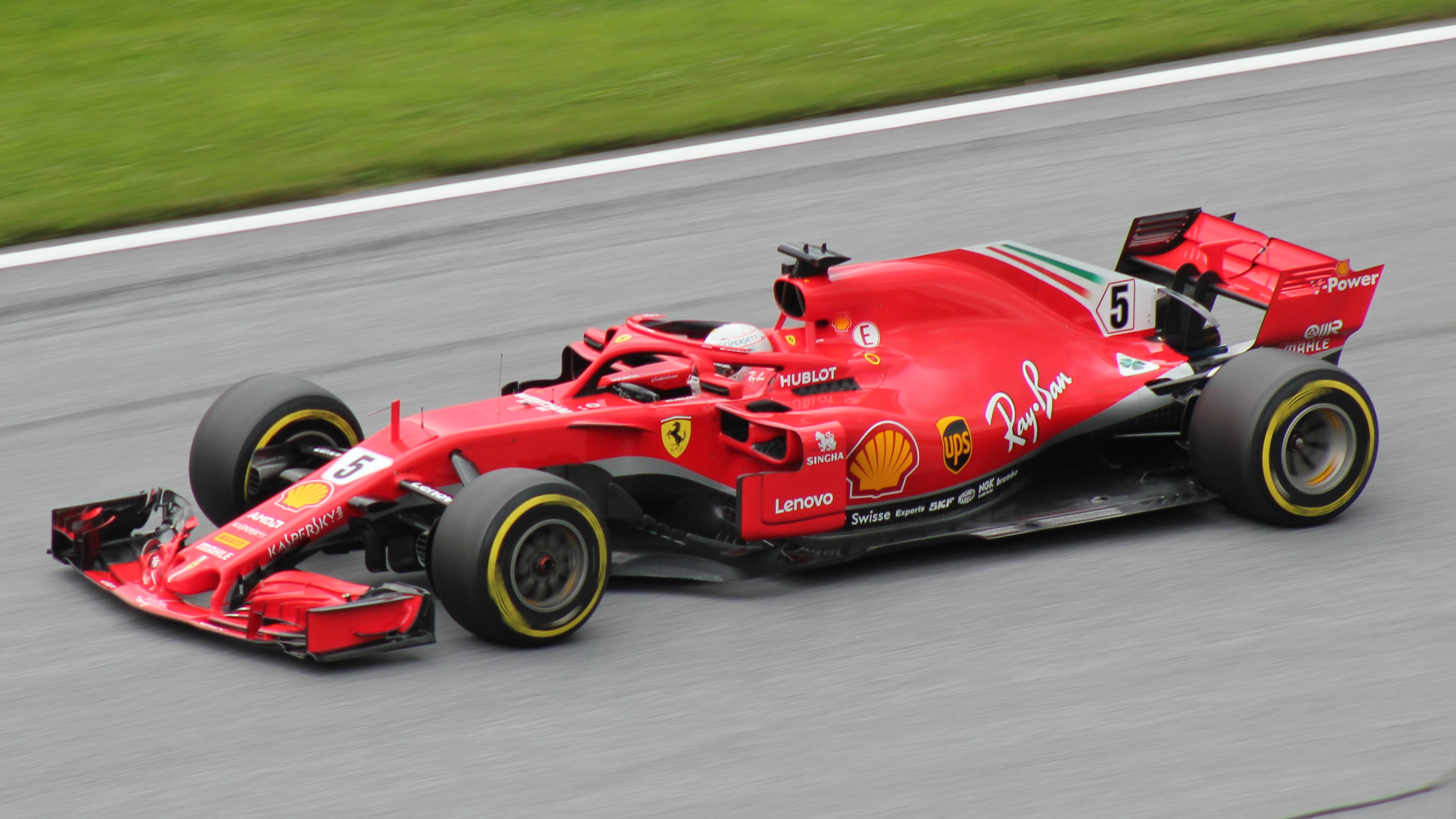
Ferrari finished second in the Constructors' Championship for the second consecutive year.

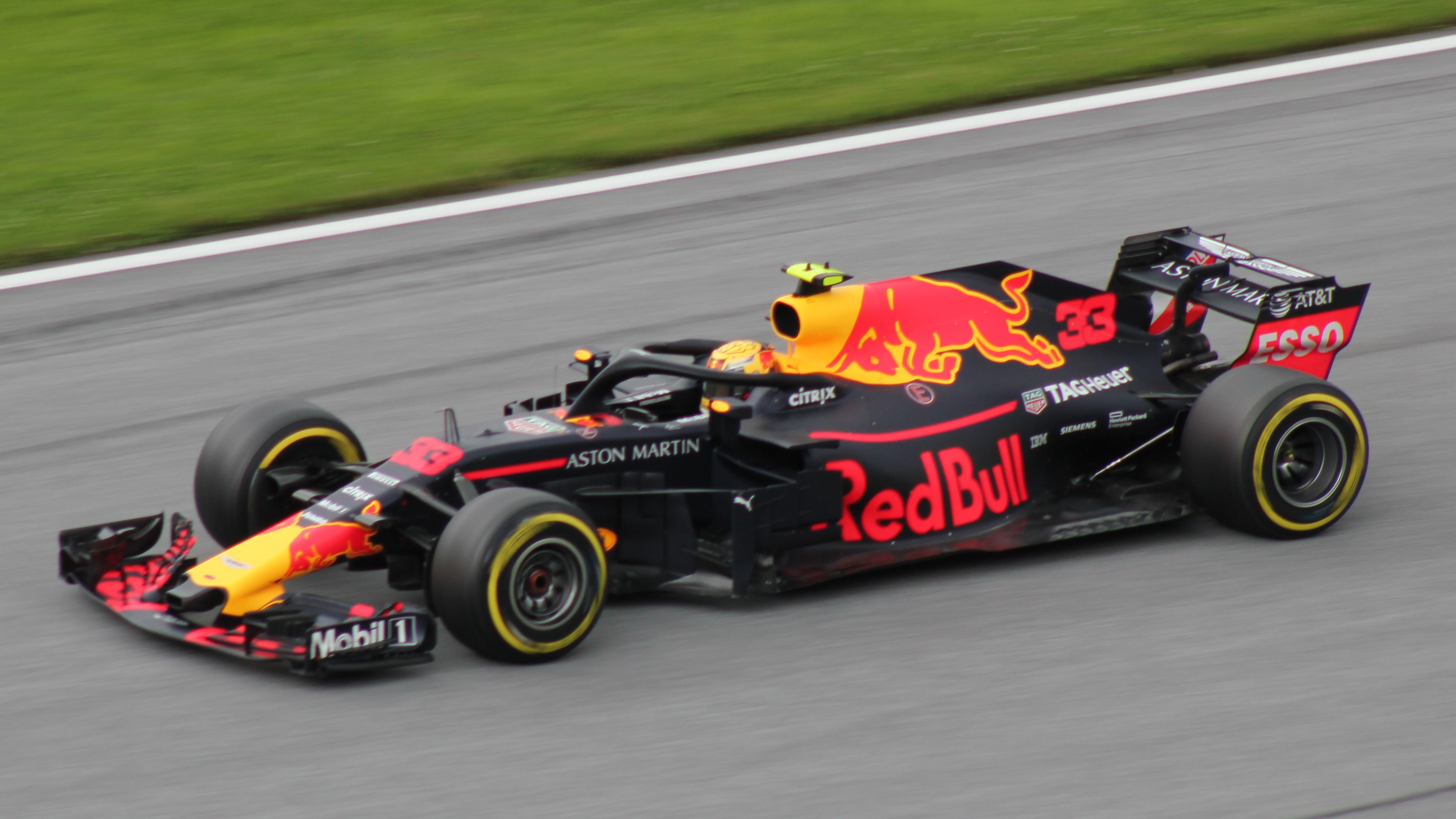
Red Bull Racing finished third in the Constructors' Championship for the second consecutive year.

The 2018 FIA Formula One World Championship was the motor racing championship for Formula One cars and the 69th running of the Formula One World Championship. Formula One is recognised by the governing body of international motorsport, the Fédération Internationale de l'Automobile (FIA), as the highest class of competition for open-wheel racing cars. Drivers and teams competed in twenty-one Grands Prix for the World Drivers' and World Constructors' championship titles.

For the second consecutive year, the season featured a title battle between Mercedes and Ferrari. The 2018 season saw two four-time World Champions, Lewis Hamilton and Sebastian Vettel, as the main Championship challengers. It was the first time in Formula One history, two quadruple world champions would be competing for a fifth title, and the season was billed as the "Fight for Five" by journalists and fans. The championship lead ebbed and flowed between the two title contenders, the points lead swapping hands five times throughout the year. At the halfway point after the British Grand Prix, Vettel led the title battle by eight points. Hamilton clinched his fifth World Drivers' Championship title at the 2018 Mexican Grand Prix, with the team securing its fifth consecutive World Constructors' Championship title at the following race. Ferrari driver Sebastian Vettel finished runner-up, 88 points behind Hamilton, with his teammate Kimi Räikkönen finishing third. In the Constructors' Championship, Mercedes finished 84 points ahead of Ferrari, with Red Bull Racing-TAG Heuer in third, 152 points behind Ferrari.

In 2018, the championship saw the introduction of a new cockpit protection device, known as the "halo". The introduction of the halo was the first stage of a planned rollout that would see the device adopted in all FIA-sanctioned and non-FIA-sanctioned open wheel series by 2020.

The season saw the debut of future race winner Charles Leclerc.

== Entries ==
The following teams and drivers participated in the 2018 FIA Formula One World Championship. All teams competed with tyres supplied by Pirelli.

Entrant	Constructor	Chassis	Power unit	Race drivers		
Entrant	Constructor	Chassis	Power unit	No.	Driver name	Rounds
(Italy) Scuderia Ferrari (Note: Scuderia Ferrari entered as "Scuderia Ferrari Mission Winnow" for the final five championship rounds.)	Ferrari	SF71H	Ferrari 062 EVO	5; 7	(Germany) Sebastian Vettel (Finland) Kimi Räikkönen	All; All
Sahara Force India F1 Team	Force India-Mercedes	VJM11	Mercedes M09 EQ Power+	11; 31	(Mexico) Sergio Pérez (France) Esteban Ocon	1–12; 1–12
(United Kingdom) Racing Point Force India F1 Team (Note: Sahara Force India F1 Team was excluded from the championship when its parent company went into administration and the team was unable to continue after race 12 of the season. The team's assets were purchased by Racing Point UK Ltd. and entered into the championship as the new team known as Racing Point Force India F1 Team, which competed from race 13 (Belgian Grand Prix) onwards.)	Force India-Mercedes	VJM11	Mercedes M09 EQ Power+	11; 31	(Mexico) Sergio Pérez (France) Esteban Ocon	13–21; 13–21
(United States) Haas F1 Team	Haas-Ferrari	VF-18	Ferrari 062 EVO	8; 20	(France) Romain Grosjean (Denmark) Kevin Magnussen	All; All
(United Kingdom) McLaren F1 Team	McLaren-Renault	MCL33	Renault R.E.18	2; 14	(Belgium) Stoffel Vandoorne (Spain) Fernando Alonso	All; All
(Germany) Mercedes AMG Petronas Motorsport	Mercedes	F1 W09 EQ Power+	Mercedes M09 EQ Power+	44; 77	(United Kingdom) Lewis Hamilton (Finland) Valtteri Bottas	All; All
(Austria) Aston Martin Red Bull Racing	Red Bull Racing-TAG Heuer	RB14	TAG Heuer F1-2018 (Note: Red Bull Racing used Renault R.E.18 power units. For sponsorship purposes, these engines were rebadged as "TAG Heuer".)	3; 33	(Australia) Daniel Ricciardo (Netherlands) Max Verstappen	All; All
(France) Renault Sport Formula One Team	Renault	R.S.18	Renault R.E.18	27; 55	(Germany) Nico Hülkenberg (Spain) Carlos Sainz Jr.	All; All
(Switzerland) Alfa Romeo Sauber F1 Team	Sauber-Ferrari	C37	Ferrari 062 EVO	9; 16	(Sweden) Marcus Ericsson (Monaco) Charles Leclerc	All; All
(Italy) Red Bull Toro Rosso Honda	Scuderia Toro Rosso-Honda	STR13	Honda RA618H	10; 28	(France) Pierre Gasly (New Zealand) Brendon Hartley	All; All
(United Kingdom) Williams Martini Racing	Williams-Mercedes	FW41	Mercedes M09 EQ Power+	18; 35	(Canada) Lance Stroll (Russia) Sergey Sirotkin	All; All

^{†} All engines were 1.6 litre, V6 turbo hybrid configuration.

=== Free practice drivers ===
Across the season six drivers served as third or free practice drivers for teams. Lewis Hamilton ran the number one on his car in Abu Dhabi Grand Prix first practice.

Drivers that took part in a free practice session
Constructor	No.	Driver name	Rounds
Force India-Mercedes	34	(Canada) Nicholas Latifi	7, 11^{1} 16, 18–20^{2}
McLaren-Renault	47	(United Kingdom) Lando Norris	13–14, 16–20
Renault	46	(Russia) Artem Markelov	16
Sauber-Ferrari	36	(Italy) Antonio Giovinazzi	11–12, 16, 19–21
Scuderia Toro Rosso-Honda	38	(Indonesia) Sean Gelael	18
Williams-Mercedes	40	(Poland) Robert Kubica	5, 9, 21

^1 – Contested under Sahara Force India ownership.
^2 – Contested under Racing Point Force India ownership.

=== Team changes ===
McLaren terminated their engine partnership with Honda and instead signed a three-year deal for power units supplied by Renault. The team cited Honda's repeated failure to supply a reliable and competitive power unit as the reason for ending the partnership.

Toro Rosso parted ways with Renault – allowing McLaren to finalise their agreement with Renault – and came to an agreement to use full-works Honda power units for the first time in history. As part of the deal, Red Bull Racing loaned Toro Rosso driver Carlos Sainz Jr. to Renault's works team.

Sauber renewed their partnership with Ferrari, upgrading to current-specification power units after using year-old power units in 2017 and also signed a sponsorship deal that saw Alfa Romeo become their title sponsor.

==== Mid-season changes ====
Force India were placed into administration on 27 July 2018, during the Hungarian Grand Prix weekend. After speculation of a purchase, any sale of the team in a short time-span was complicated by legal proceedings against certain shareholders and the need for debt settlement. A consortium led by Lawrence Stroll purchased the racing assets and operations of Force India through a company named Racing Point UK Ltd. The original team, known as "Sahara Force India", was then excluded from the Constructors' Championship on the grounds of their inability to participate in remaining races. This allowed a new team known as "Racing Point Force India" to apply for a late entry and start their participation in the championship from the Belgian Grand Prix. The team was required to keep "Force India" as part of their constructor name as their chassis had been homologated under the Force India name and Formula One sporting regulations required the constructor name to include the chassis name. The new team began with zero points in the Constructors' Championship, though their drivers retained the points they had scored in the Drivers' Championship. The other teams later agreed to allow the Racing Point Force India team to retain prize money accrued by Sahara Force India in the preceding years.

=== Driver changes ===
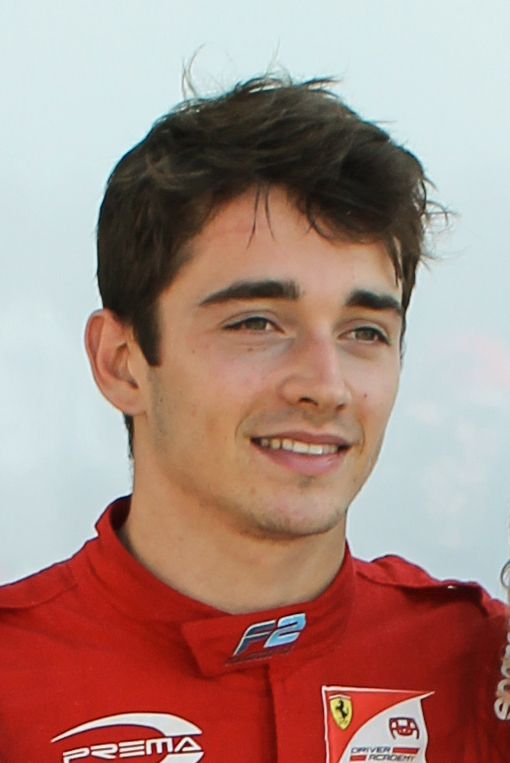
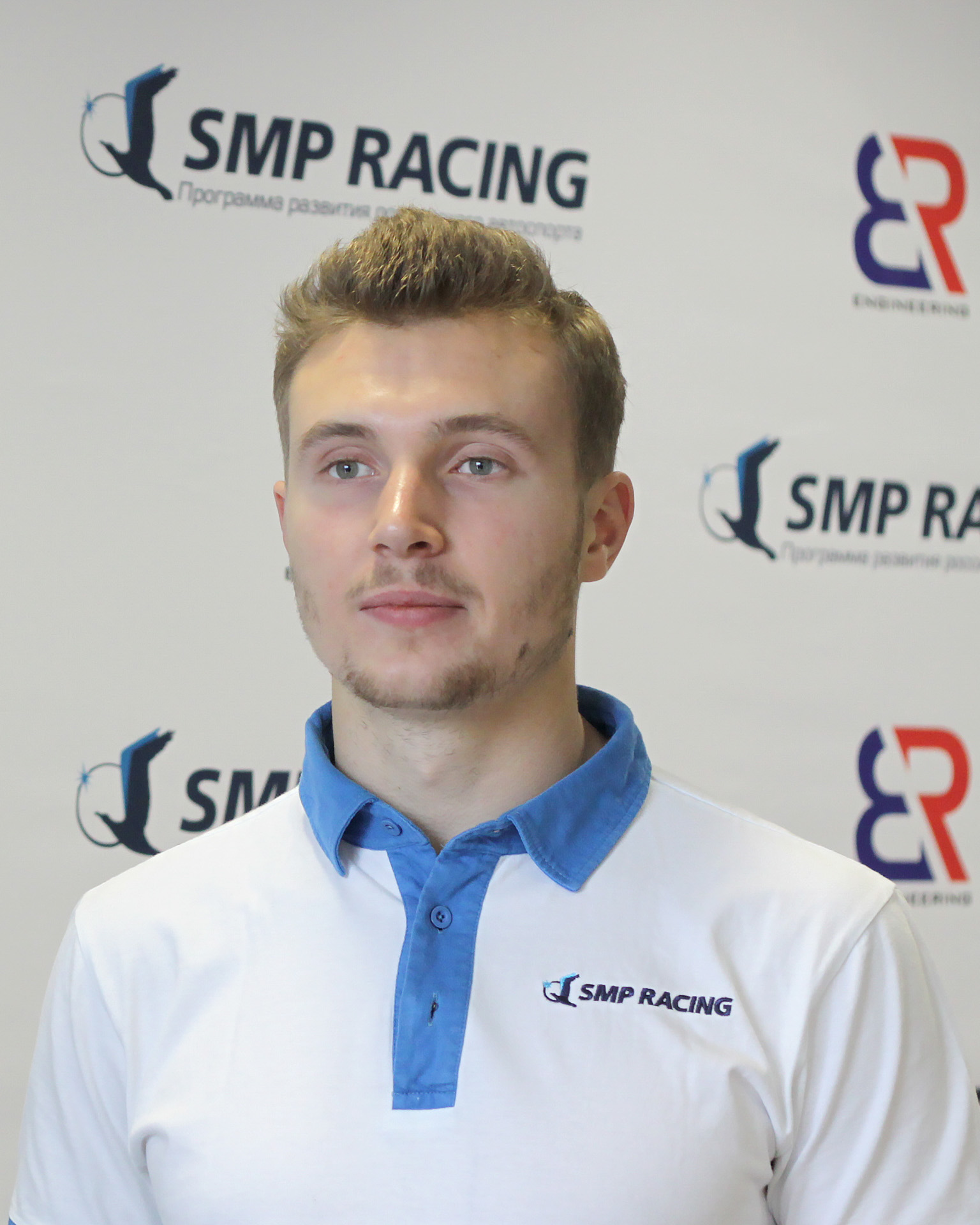
Charles Leclerc (left) and Sergey Sirotkin (right) made their Formula One débuts with Sauber and Williams respectively.
- Toro Rosso signed 2016 GP2 Series champion Pierre Gasly and two-time World Endurance champion Brendon Hartley as their full-time drivers for 2018, with Hartley becoming the first full-time New Zealander driver since Denny Hulme in 1974. Both Gasly and Hartley made their Formula One debuts with the team in the latter stages of the 2017 championship. Daniil Kvyat left the team and the Red Bull driver programme, securing a development role with Ferrari.
- Charles Leclerc, the reigning Formula 2 champion, made his competitive début with Sauber. Leclerc, who had previously driven in Friday practice sessions in 2016 and 2017, was hired by the team to replace Pascal Wehrlein. Wehrlein was ultimately unable to secure a race seat and was instead enlisted as one of Mercedes's test and reserve drivers while racing full-time in the Deutsche Tourenwagen Masters series.
- 2008 runner-up Felipe Massa retired from Formula One at the end of the 2017 championship. Massa was replaced by former Renault test driver and SMP Racing driver Sergey Sirotkin, who made his competitive début with the team.

== Calendar ==
Nations that hosted a Grand Prix in 2018 are highlighted in green, with circuit locations marked with a black dot. Former host nations are shown in dark grey, and former host circuits are marked with a white dot.

The following twenty-one Grands Prix were run as part of the 2018 World Championship:

Schedule of events
Round	Grand Prix	Circuit	Date
1	Australian Grand Prix	(Australia) Albert Park Circuit, Melbourne	25 March
2	Bahrain Grand Prix	Bahrain International Circuit, Sakhir	8 April
3	Chinese Grand Prix	(China) Shanghai International Circuit, Shanghai	15 April
4	Azerbaijan Grand Prix	(Azerbaijan) Baku City Circuit, Baku	29 April
5	Spanish Grand Prix	(Spain) Circuit de Barcelona-Catalunya, Montmeló	13 May
6	Monaco Grand Prix	Circuit de Monaco, Monte Carlo	27 May
7	Canadian Grand Prix	(Canada) Circuit Gilles Villeneuve, Montreal	10 June
8	French Grand Prix	(France) Circuit Paul Ricard, Le Castellet	24 June
9	Austrian Grand Prix	(Austria) Red Bull Ring, Spielberg	1 July
10	British Grand Prix	(United Kingdom) Silverstone Circuit, Silverstone	8 July
11	German Grand Prix	(Germany) Hockenheimring, Hockenheim	22 July
12	Hungarian Grand Prix	(Hungary) Hungaroring, Mogyoród	29 July
13	Belgian Grand Prix	(Belgium) Circuit de Spa-Francorchamps, Stavelot	26 August
14	Italian Grand Prix	(Italy) Autodromo Nazionale di Monza, Monza	2 September
15	Singapore Grand Prix	Marina Bay Street Circuit, Singapore	16 September
16	Russian Grand Prix	(Russia) Sochi Autodrom, Sochi	30 September
17	Japanese Grand Prix	(Japan) Suzuka International Racing Course, Suzuka	7 October
18	United States Grand Prix	(United States) Circuit of the Americas, Austin, Texas	21 October
19	Mexican Grand Prix	Autódromo Hermanos Rodríguez, Mexico City	28 October
20	Brazilian Grand Prix	(Brazil) Autódromo José Carlos Pace, São Paulo	11 November
21	Abu Dhabi Grand Prix	(United Arab Emirates) Yas Marina Circuit, Abu Dhabi	25 November

=== Calendar changes ===
The championship returned to the Circuit Paul Ricard for the first time since 1990.

The French Grand Prix returned to the calendar for the first time since 2008. The race has returned to the Circuit Paul Ricard, which last hosted the French Grand Prix in 1990 before the event moved to the Circuit de Nevers Magny-Cours. (Note: The French Grand Prix used the short 3.812 km (2.369 mi) configuration of the Circuit Paul Ricard between 1986 and 1990; the longer 5.809 km (3.610 mi) circuit was used nine times between 1971 and 1985. The 5.842 km (3.630 mi) layout was used for the first time in 2018.) The race was scheduled to be run in June, with the Azerbaijan Grand Prix brought forward to April to accommodate the change and to avoid clashing with celebrations for the centenary of the Azerbaijan republic. The German Grand Prix also returned to the championship after a one-year absence, with the Hockenheimring hosting the race.

The Malaysian Grand Prix, which was part of the championship from 1999 to 2017, was discontinued. The Russian Grand Prix was moved from April to September, filling the vacancy left by the Malaysian Grand Prix.

== Changes ==
=== Sporting regulations ===
Following widespread criticism of the grid penalty system in 2017 that regularly saw multiple drivers start races outside their qualifying positions, the FIA introduced a revised set of regulations for 2018. In the event that a driver changes a power unit component, they are still subject to a five- or ten-place grid penalty depending on the component being changed; however, should they then replace a second component, they will be moved to the back of the starting grid. If multiple drivers are moved to the back of the grid, their starting positions are determined by the order that components were changed based on the most recent change made by each driver.

The rules governing starting procedures were changed for 2018, granting race stewards the power to issue penalties for improper race starts even if a driver's start does not trigger the automated detection system. The changes were introduced following two incidents during 2017: at the Chinese Grand Prix, Sebastian Vettel positioned his car too far across his grid slot to be registered by the detection system; while at the Austrian Grand Prix, Valtteri Bottas's start was called into question for his reaction time despite the detection system recognising it as legal.

In the event that a race is suspended due to a red flag, it would be restarted with a standing start. Drivers would return to the starting grid in the positions they held at the time of the suspension and the race director would repeat the race start procedure. If circuit conditions are suitable for racing but the race director deems a standing start inappropriate, the race would resume with a rolling start where the safety car returns to pit lane and drivers proceed around the circuit in single file until they are shown the green flag.

The FIA introduced tighter restrictions on racing licences issued to drivers taking part in free practice sessions. Candidate drivers are required to complete a minimum number of Formula 2 races or earn twenty-five superlicense points over a three-year period. The changes were introduced to address concerns about drivers who would not be able to meet the standards required to compete in Formula One having access to Formula One cars.

The schedule of a Grand Prix weekend was changed, with the start time of most European races pushed back by one hour in an attempt to accommodate a larger television audience. All races were scheduled to start at ten minutes past the hour so as to allow broadcasters the opportunity for pre-race coverage, especially in cases when their broadcast of the race starts on the hour.

Finally, the mid-season test, which was held in Bahrain in 2017, was moved to Barcelona.

=== Technical regulations ===
Power unit suppliers are required to provide all teams using their engines with an identical specification of power units. The change was introduced to ensure parity after Mercedes's works team was observed to have access to additional engine performance settings that were not available to their customer teams.

The quantity of power unit components a driver may use during the season was reduced from four complete power units during the entire season in 2017 to a new system where each of the power unit components is considered separately. Therefore, in 2018, each driver is permitted to use up to three each of internal combustion engines (ICE), heat motor generator units (MGU-H), and turbochargers (TC); and two each of the kinetic motor generator units (MGU-K), energy stores (ES), and control electronics (CE).

Restrictions against the practice of oil burning, where engine oils are burned as fuel to boost performance, were also introduced. The practice, which was first used in 2017 saw teams burning as much as 1.2 litres per one hundred kilometres. For the 2018 championship, this figure was revised down to a maximum of 0.6 litres per one hundred kilometres. The rules were further amended to restrict teams to using a single specification of oil, which must be declared before the race. These oils are subject to stricter definitions of what is considered "oil" in order to prevent teams from using exotic blends designed to boost performance. Teams are also required to inform the stewards of the mass of oil in each oil tank before the race. (Note: Formula One measures fuel, oil and engine fluids in mass rather than volume as these fluids expand and contract when subject to heat and as a result the volume may change; however, the mass remains the same regardless of heat.)

Further changes to the technical regulations require the temperature of air in the plenum chamber – adjacent to the turbocharger – to be more than 10 °C above the ambient air temperature. This rule was introduced in a bid to limit the performance gains possible via charge air cooling. Active control valves, which electronically regulate the flow of fluids between power unit components, were also banned.

The FIA banned the use of "shark fins", a carbon fibre extension to the engine cowling aimed at directing airflow over the rear wing. The use of "T-wings", a horizontal secondary wing mounted forward of and above the rear wing, was also banned.

=== Driver safety ===
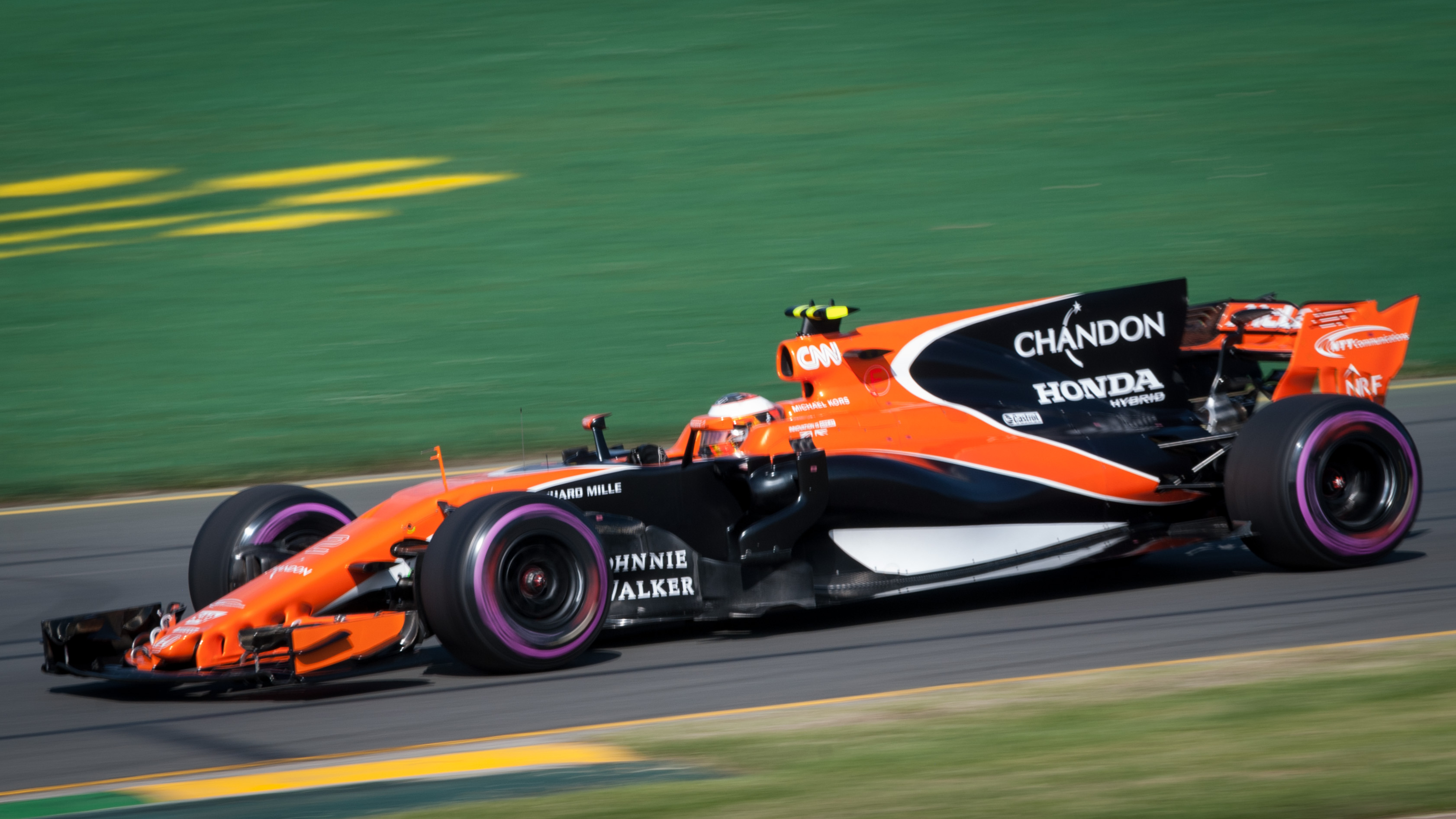

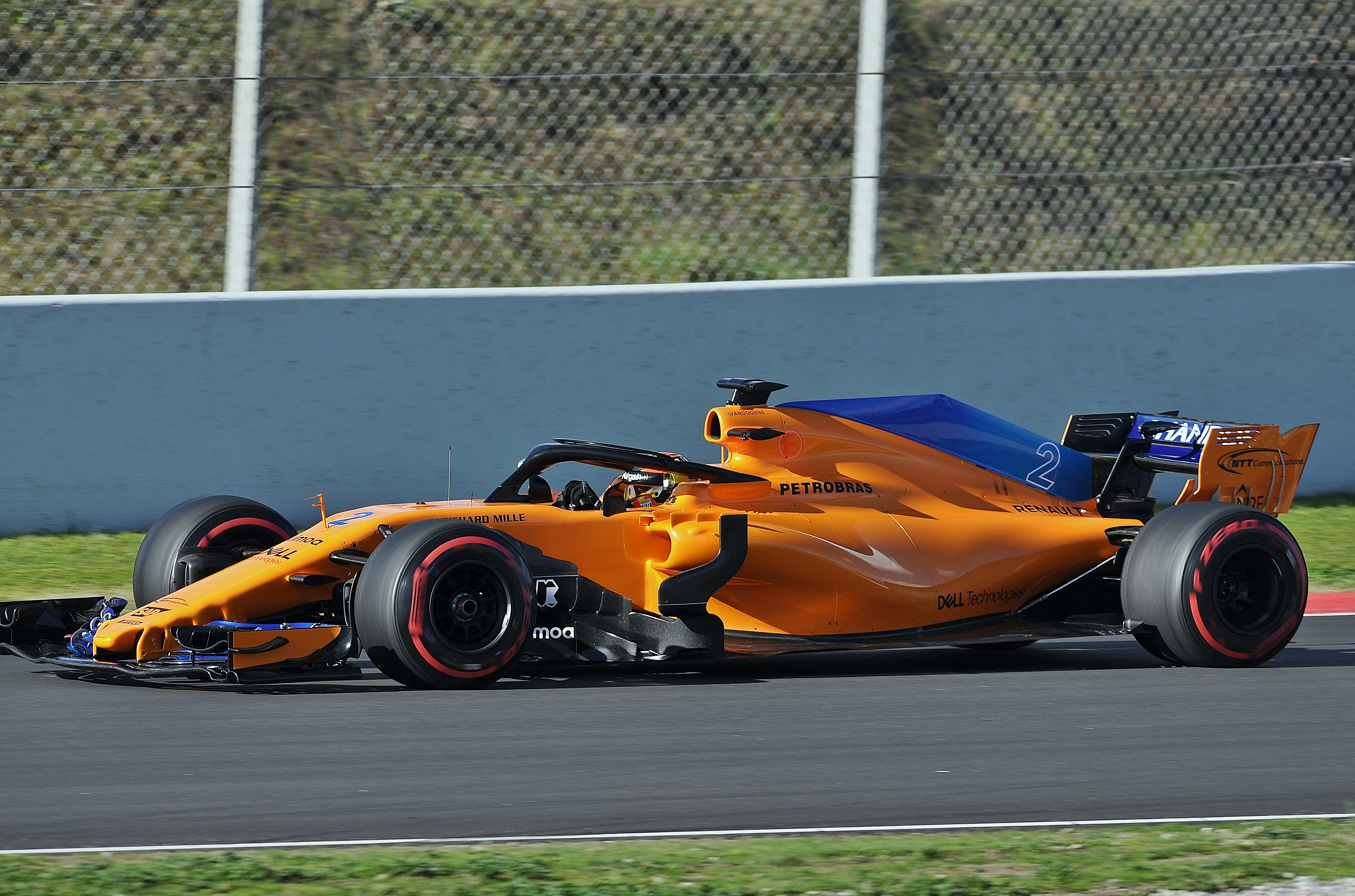
Comparison between the McLaren MCL32 (top) and the MCL33 (bottom) showing the addition of the "halo" cockpit protection device and removal of the "shark fin"

Following a series of serious incidents in open-wheel racing – including the fatal accidents of Henry Surtees and Justin Wilson – in which drivers were struck in the head by tyres or debris, the FIA announced plans to introduce additional mandatory cockpit protection with 2018 given as the first year for its introduction. Several solutions were tested, with the final design subject to feedback from teams and drivers. Each design was created to deflect debris away from a driver's head without compromising their visibility or the ability of safety marshals to access the cockpit and extract a driver and their seat in the event of a serious accident or medical emergency, with a series of serious accidents – such as the fatal accidents of Jules Bianchi and Dan Wheldon – recreated to simulate the ability of devices to withstand a serious impact. The FIA ultimately settled on the "halo", a wishbone-shaped frame mounted above and around the driver's head and anchored to the monocoque forward of the cockpit. Seventeen accidents were examined as case studies, with the FIA concluding that the halo would have prevented injuries in fifteen of them. In the other two instances – most notably Jules Bianchi's fatal accident – the FIA concluded that although the halo would not have prevented driver injuries, it would not have contributed to or complicated the outcome of the accidents. Once introduced, the halo concept is scheduled to be applied to other FIA-sanctioned open-wheel racing categories including Formula 2, Formula 3 and Formula E, with 2020 earmarked as the deadline for all FIA-sanctioned open-wheel racing series to adopt the halo.

Following criticisms over the aesthetic value of the device, the FIA revealed plans to allow teams some design freedom in the final version of the halo, with the teams permitted to attach a thin single-plane wing atop the halo to control airflow over the top of the car and into the airbox to assist with engine cooling. Where the test models of the halo had been attached to an existing monocoque structure, teams were required to incorporate the final build of the halo into the chassis design from its inception rather than attached once the design was completed. The minimum weight of the chassis was raised to 734 kg (1,618.2 lb), in order to accommodate the additional weight of the halo. The mandatory crash tests that each chassis must pass were adjusted to include a new static load test. In order to simulate a serious accident, a tyre was mounted to a hydraulic ram and fired at the crash structure; to pass the test, the chassis and the mounting points for the halo had to remain intact. In order to prevent teams from exploiting the halo for aerodynamic gain and potentially compromising its purpose, the FIA banned teams from developing their own devices and instead required them to purchase pre-fabricated models from approved suppliers. The technical regulations were updated mid-season to allow teams to mount rear view mirrors to the halo instead of affixing them to the bodywork. The changes were introduced in response to criticism that the halo obstructed the driver's view of the mirrors; however, halo-mounted designs were also criticised for allowing teams to exploit a loophole and introduce aerodynamic device, in the form of winglets above the mirrors, into an area where aerodynamic development was prohibited under the pretense of improving driver visibility, and the regulations were rewritten once more to ban the practice of mounting anything besides mirrors on the halo.

The FIA made several changes to its trackside procedures to further accommodate the halo. The time limit on the extraction test – the test of a driver extracting himself from the survival cell of a crashed car – was extended to allow drivers more time to escape. The starting gantries at circuits were also lowered to improve the visibility of the starting lights.

=== Tyres ===
Tyre supplier Pirelli provided teams with two new tyre compounds in 2018. Each of the 2017 compounds was made softer, with a new "hypersoft" tyre becoming the softest of the nine and a new "superhard" tyre to be the hardest. The hypersoft compound was marked by a pink sidewall, while the superhard was orange. The hard compound, which previously used orange markings, was changed to ice blue. The hypersoft compound made its début at the Monaco Grand Prix. The rules dictating which tyres are available were relaxed to allow Pirelli to supply a wider range of compounds. Previously, Pirelli had to provide sequential compounds; for example, ultrasoft, supersoft and soft. In 2018, Pirelli was able to supply compounds with up to two steps of difference between them; for example, the ultrasoft, supersoft and hard tyres. Pirelli was required to manufacture an additional tyre compound that was not intended for competition. This tyre was to be supplied to teams for use in demonstration events to prevent teams from using demonstration events as informal – and illegal – testing.

For the Spanish, French and British Grands Prix, Pirelli reduced the tread depth by 0.4mm across all compounds. This was to combat blistering due to new asphalt at these circuits for the 2018 season, which resulted in higher grip and reduced tyre wear. This was in response to the high level of blistering experienced by Mercedes at the re-surfaced Circuit de Barcelona-Catalunya in pre-season testing.

== Season report ==
=== Opening rounds ===
The championship started in Melbourne with the Australian Grand Prix. The race concluded with a victory for Ferrari and Sebastian Vettel, who used a timely virtual safety car period – triggered by the stricken Haas of Romain Grosjean – to pass Mercedes's Lewis Hamilton, after which Vettel successfully defended his position until the finish. Kimi Räikkönen finished third in the other Ferrari ahead of Red Bull Racing's Daniel Ricciardo. McLaren ended the first race of their partnership with Renault with a fifth and ninth place for Alonso and Vandoorne respectively. Max Verstappen finished sixth after an early spin ahead of Nico Hülkenberg. Valtteri Bottas was eighth, having started fifteenth when he took a penalty for a gearbox change after a heavy crash in qualifying. Carlos Sainz Jr. completed the points-scoring positions in tenth. Charles Leclerc and Sergey Sirotkin both made their competitive débuts for Sauber and Williams respectively. Leclerc finished thirteenth while Sirotkin retired with a brake failure.

Vettel then won from pole at the next round in Bahrain, holding off a late charge from Bottas to win by seven-tenths of a second. Hamilton finished third despite a 5 place grid penalty for a gearbox change and contact with Verstappen on the second lap.

However, in China, Vettel's winning run was broken, with Ricciardo's 2 stop strategy helping the Australian to his sixth career victory, ahead of Bottas and Räikkönen. Ricciardo pitted for a new set of softs with 20 laps to go under safety car while the leaders stayed out on their used set of mediums, he then fought his way past both Ferraris and Mercedes to the lead.

Hamilton took his first win of the year in Azerbaijan and with it, the lead in the Drivers' Championship. Räikkönen finished 2nd while Sergio Pérez claimed 3rd. With 10 laps to go, Bottas was leading (but still needing to make a pitstop) followed by Vettel and Hamilton. When the Red Bulls crashed they brought out the safety car. Bottas pitted under safety car and came out still leading but a puncture on the penultimate lap caused him to retire. Vettel, who was second behind him at the restart, locked up on cold tyres at turn 1 and went wide, dropping behind the remaining top three.

=== European and Canadian rounds ===
In Spain, Hamilton had taken pole position. However, the first lap saw the safety car deployed when Haas's Romain Grosjean spun off at turn 3. He had spun back onto the track, but his spinning rear tyres caused a plume of smoke to billow, which Pierre Gasly of Toro Rosso and Nico Hülkenberg of Renault got caught in and led to a 3-car retirement. In the end, Hamilton won comfortably in Spain, extending his lead to seventeen points. Bottas finished second while Verstappen finished third, his first podium of the season.

Ricciardo took pole in Monaco and won the event despite developing an engine problem mid-race that left him severely down on power. Vettel finished second and Hamilton finished 3rd. Vettel closed his points deficit to Hamilton, while Ricciardo gained two spots in the Drivers' Championship to be third overall.

In Canada, Vettel won from pole taking the world championship lead by one point from Hamilton. Bottas finished 2nd for the fourth time this season as Verstappen finished third, his qualifying position. The race result was counted back to the standings at the end of lap 68 (of 70) after the chequered flag was waved a lap early in error – although this did not impact the top 10 standings. The fastest lap of the race however, was affected. Red Bull's Daniel Ricciardo had set two fastest laps on laps 69 and 70, but because the chequered flag mistakenly waved early and the results were taken from lap 68, the fastest lap went to Max Verstappen, who had set it back on lap 65.

Hamilton took pole position and victory (his third of the season) in the returning French Grand Prix, taking the world championship lead back with 14 points, with Vettel finishing only 5th after a first corner crash with Bottas. Verstappen finished second, taking advantage of the Vettel–Bottas crash. Räikkönen finished third, passing Ricciardo in the closing laps of the race.

In Austria, Bottas started the race on pole, followed by Hamilton and Räikkönen. However, in the race, both Mercedes suffered from technical problems and neither one was able to finish the race. Ricciardo also retired from the race. Verstappen won, followed by Räikkönen in 2nd and Vettel in 3rd. Haas took full advantage of the Mercedes and Ricciardo retirements and finished 4th (Grosjean) and 5th (Magnussen). Vettel re-took the lead of the championship by 1 point, following Hamilton's retirement.

At his home race in Great Britain, Hamilton took pole on his final flying lap, with the two Ferraris of Vettel and Räikkönen both within a tenth of his time. However, he dropped down to 18th on the first lap after contact with Räikkönen sent him into a spin. Two safety car periods late in the race bunched the field up, one for a single car crash involving Ericsson and the other after contact between Grosjean and Sainz. Vettel passed Bottas for the lead with 5 laps to go to take his fourth win of the season and extend his championship lead. Hamilton recovered from his first lap crash to take second ahead of Räikkönen.

In Germany, Vettel took his fifth pole of the season on home turf. He led the race until lap 52 when he made a mistake at turn 13 and crashed into the wall following a small rain shower, forcing him to retire. The incident triggered a safety car, which saw the leading cars of Bottas and Räikkönen pit for new tyres. Meanwhile, Hamilton took the lead of the race after starting 14th having made one less pit stop. After the safety car restart, Hamilton led Bottas home in a 1–2 for Mercedes on home soil with Räikkönen completing the podium for Ferrari.

In Hungary, Hamilton started from pole after a soaking Q3 and won the race, with Vettel and Räikkönen completing the podium.

The season resumed in Belgium, after the mid-season break. Hamilton started from pole but lost the lead to title rival Vettel on the first lap after a straight-line high-speed pass. Vettel eventually won the race with Hamilton second and Verstappen completing the podium with third. Also notable was a first-corner crash that saw a lock-up by Hülkenberg send Alonso over the top of Leclerc, while Räikkönen and Ricciardo had their own incident that eventually ended both drivers' races. The race was almost down to 18 cars due to the original Sahara Force India team having gone into administration earlier on, but a new Racing Point Force India team (whose owners includes Williams driver Lance Stroll's father Lawrence) was accepted to the grid in time for the race. Because technically it was a new entry into the championship of a new team, Force India had to start from scratch in the Constructors' Championship, but drivers Sergio Pérez and Esteban Ocon were allowed to keep the points they had earned in the Drivers' Championship. Racing Point Force India qualified 3rd and 4th on the grid during qualifying, and finished 5th and 6th in the race.

In Italy, on Ferrari's home turf, Räikkönen took the fastest ever pole position in F1 history until the 2020 Italian Grand Prix, ahead of teammate Vettel. There was a first lap incident between Hamilton and Vettel which left the latter struggling as he could only manage 4th. During a nail-biting race, Hamilton overtook Räikkönen on lap 45, thus winning his sixth race of the season, with Räikkönen finishing second and Bottas finishing third after a collision with Verstappen. Sergey Sirotkin scored his first and only point in the season by finishing 10th after the disqualification of Romain Grosjean – thus ensuring that every driver who entered the championship managed to score points, which happened for the first time in the series' history.

=== Closing rounds ===
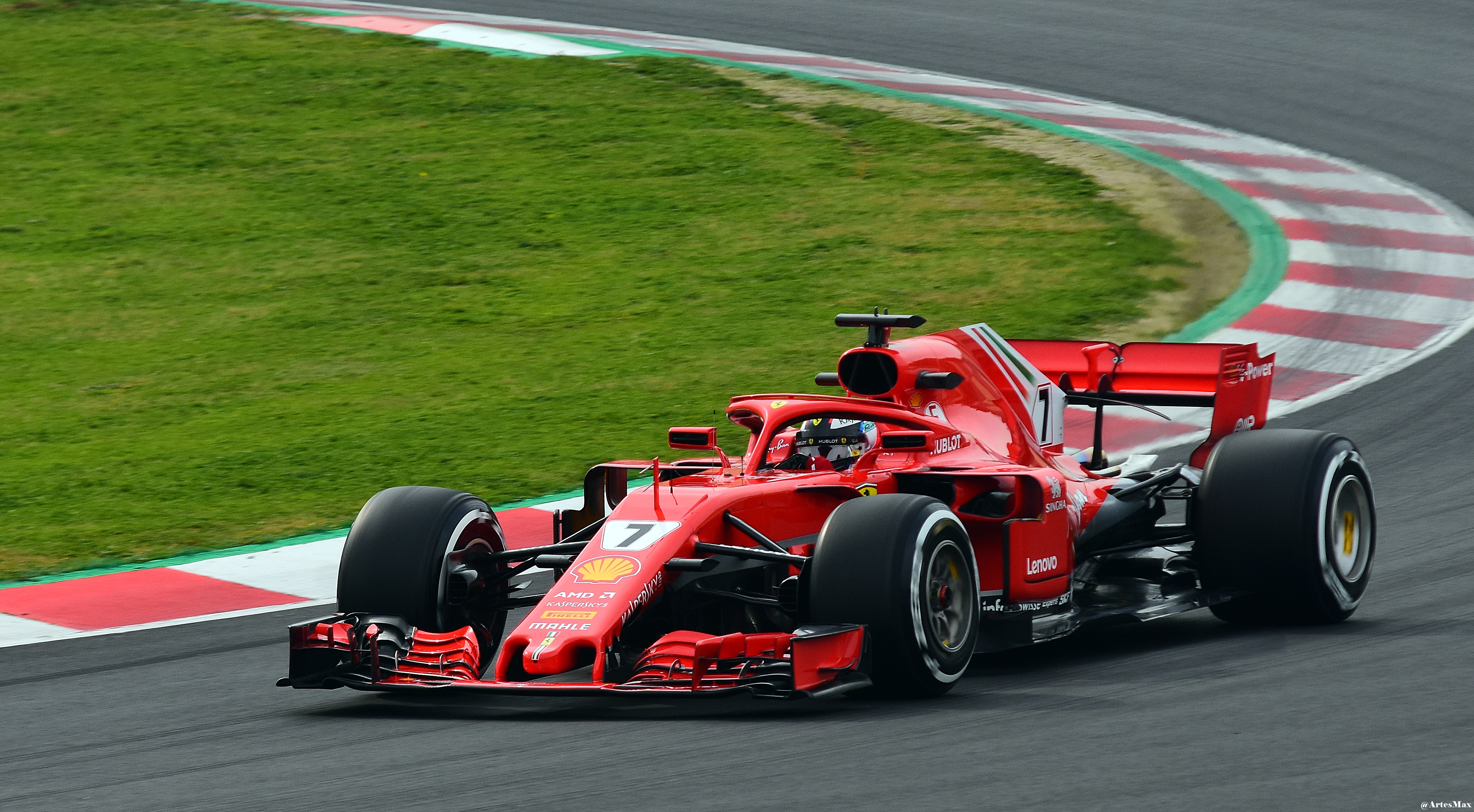
By winning the United States Grand Prix, Kimi Räikkönen (pictured at Barcelona) won his first F1 race since 2013 and the first for Ferrari since 2009, in his final year at the team.

In Singapore, a track where Mercedes traditionally struggled, Hamilton took pole position with the fastest lap which he described as "magical" and as one of the best laps he's ever done. Hamilton would go on to win the race with title rival Vettel finishing third behind Verstappen. The race also saw both Kevin Magnussen and Haas get their first fastest lap.

In Russia, Bottas started from pole and was the virtual race leader for the first half of the race but obeyed team orders and allowed Hamilton to overtake him on lap 26. This allowed Hamilton to win the race followed by Bottas and Vettel.

In Japan, Hamilton took the pole which he then converted into victory after leading every lap, he was followed by Bottas in second and Max Verstappen in third. This was Hamilton's 80th pole position and Bottas's 30th podium finish.

At the United States Grand Prix, Hamilton could win the world championship if he outscored Vettel by 8 points or more. It was Hamilton who took pole with Räikkönen starting second. Vettel actually qualified second but had to start fifth after being penalised for not slowing enough during a red flag period in first practice. The race was won by Räikkönen, his first win in 114 grand prix which was a new record. Verstappen finished second and Hamilton third, as Vettel finished fourth. Hamilton only outscored Vettel by three points meaning he had failed to wrap up the title on his first attempt.

In Mexico, Vettel needed to win the Grand Prix and Hamilton 8th or lower for the Championship to remain in contention. Red Bull's Daniel Ricciardo secured his latest pole position, but would eventually retire from the Grand Prix with an engine failure, his eighth failure to finish during the season. His teammate, Max Verstappen won by 17.3 seconds while Vettel came in second place. Hamilton finished in 4th place, which was enough to secure his fifth Drivers' Championship.

In Brazil, the penultimate race of the season, Ferrari needed to outscore Mercedes by at least 13 points to remain in contention for the Constructors' Championship. Hamilton started from pole but lost the lead to Max Verstappen on lap 40 as Mercedes had to turn his engine down to prevent failure. Verstappen then looked set to win the race, but was spun around on lap 44 by the Force India of Esteban Ocon who was attempting to unlap himself (an incident which led to a shoving match during driver weight checks after the race). Verstappen's spin allowed Hamilton to retake the lead and subsequently win the race. Räikkönen finished third for Ferrari while his teammate Vettel finished sixth after a sensor problem and a failed gamble on tyre strategy compromised his race. This, combined with Hamilton's win and Bottas's fifth-place finish, allowed Mercedes to clinch their fifth successive Constructors' Championship.

In Abu Dhabi, the final race of the season, the safety car was brought out on the first lap when Renault's Nico Hülkenberg barrel-rolled into the barricade at turn 9 after accidentally colliding with Grosjean. In his final race for Ferrari, Raikkonen retired on lap 7 when his engine failed, triggering the virtual safety car. In the end, Hamilton won with Vettel finishing second, and the two Red Bulls third and fourth. After the race, Hamilton and Vettel flanked the retiring Fernando Alonso on the post-race lap, and all three drivers performed synchronized "donuts" on the start-finish straight.

== Results and standings ==
=== Grands Prix ===
Round	Grand Prix	Pole position	Fastest lap	Winning driver	Winning constructor	Report
1	(Australia) Australian Grand Prix	(United Kingdom) Lewis Hamilton	(Australia) Daniel Ricciardo	(Germany) Sebastian Vettel	(Italy) Ferrari	Report
2	Bahrain Grand Prix	(Germany) Sebastian Vettel	(Finland) Valtteri Bottas	(Germany) Sebastian Vettel	(Italy) Ferrari	Report
3	(China) Chinese Grand Prix	(Germany) Sebastian Vettel	(Australia) Daniel Ricciardo	(Australia) Daniel Ricciardo	(Austria) Red Bull Racing-TAG Heuer	Report
4	Azerbaijan Grand Prix	(Germany) Sebastian Vettel	(Finland) Valtteri Bottas	(United Kingdom) Lewis Hamilton	(Germany) Mercedes	Report
5	(Spain) Spanish Grand Prix	(United Kingdom) Lewis Hamilton	(Australia) Daniel Ricciardo	(United Kingdom) Lewis Hamilton	(Germany) Mercedes	Report
6	Monaco Grand Prix	(Australia) Daniel Ricciardo	(Netherlands) Max Verstappen	(Australia) Daniel Ricciardo	(Austria) Red Bull Racing-TAG Heuer	Report
7	(Canada) Canadian Grand Prix	(Germany) Sebastian Vettel	(Netherlands) Max Verstappen (Note: Daniel Ricciardo set the fastest lap on lap 70, but an error in the chequered flag being waved early saw the race results validated on lap 68. Max Verstappen was officially recognised as setting the fastest lap.)	(Germany) Sebastian Vettel	(Italy) Ferrari	Report
8	(France) French Grand Prix	(United Kingdom) Lewis Hamilton	(Finland) Valtteri Bottas	(United Kingdom) Lewis Hamilton	(Germany) Mercedes	Report
9	(Austria) Austrian Grand Prix	(Finland) Valtteri Bottas	(Finland) Kimi Räikkönen	(Netherlands) Max Verstappen	(Austria) Red Bull Racing-TAG Heuer	Report
10	(United Kingdom) British Grand Prix	(United Kingdom) Lewis Hamilton	(Germany) Sebastian Vettel	(Germany) Sebastian Vettel	(Italy) Ferrari	Report
11	(Germany) German Grand Prix	(Germany) Sebastian Vettel	(United Kingdom) Lewis Hamilton	(United Kingdom) Lewis Hamilton	(Germany) Mercedes	Report
12	(Hungary) Hungarian Grand Prix	(United Kingdom) Lewis Hamilton	(Australia) Daniel Ricciardo	(United Kingdom) Lewis Hamilton	(Germany) Mercedes	Report
13	(Belgium) Belgian Grand Prix	(United Kingdom) Lewis Hamilton	(Finland) Valtteri Bottas	(Germany) Sebastian Vettel	(Italy) Ferrari	Report
14	(Italy) Italian Grand Prix	(Finland) Kimi Räikkönen	(United Kingdom) Lewis Hamilton	(United Kingdom) Lewis Hamilton	(Germany) Mercedes	Report
15	Singapore Grand Prix	(United Kingdom) Lewis Hamilton	(Denmark) Kevin Magnussen	(United Kingdom) Lewis Hamilton	(Germany) Mercedes	Report
16	(Russia) Russian Grand Prix	(Finland) Valtteri Bottas	(Finland) Valtteri Bottas	(United Kingdom) Lewis Hamilton	(Germany) Mercedes	Report
17	(Japan) Japanese Grand Prix	(United Kingdom) Lewis Hamilton	(Germany) Sebastian Vettel	(United Kingdom) Lewis Hamilton	(Germany) Mercedes	Report
18	United States Grand Prix	(United Kingdom) Lewis Hamilton	(United Kingdom) Lewis Hamilton	(Finland) Kimi Räikkönen	(Italy) Ferrari	Report
19	(Mexico) Mexican Grand Prix	(Australia) Daniel Ricciardo	(Finland) Valtteri Bottas	(Netherlands) Max Verstappen	(Austria) Red Bull Racing-TAG Heuer	Report
20	(Brazil) Brazilian Grand Prix	(United Kingdom) Lewis Hamilton	(Finland) Valtteri Bottas	(United Kingdom) Lewis Hamilton	(Germany) Mercedes	Report
21	(United Arab Emirates) Abu Dhabi Grand Prix	(United Kingdom) Lewis Hamilton	(Germany) Sebastian Vettel	(United Kingdom) Lewis Hamilton	(Germany) Mercedes	Report

=== Scoring system ===
Points were awarded to the top ten classified drivers in every race, using the following system:

Position	1st	2nd	3rd	4th	5th	6th	7th	8th	9th	10th
Points	25	18	15	12	10	8	6	4	2	1

In order for full points to be awarded, the race winner must completed at least 75% of the scheduled race distance. Half points were awarded if the race winner completes less than 75% of the race distance provided that at least two laps were completed. (Note: In the event that two laps cannot be completed, no points are awarded and the race is abandoned.) In the event of a tie at the conclusion of the championship, a count-back system was used as a tie-breaker, with a driver's/constructor's best result used to decide the standings. (Note: In the event that two or more drivers or constructors achieve the same best result an equal number of times, their next-best result will be used. If two or more drivers or constructors achieve equal results an equal number of times, the FIA nominated the winner according to such criteria as it sees fit.)

=== World Drivers' Championship standings ===
Pos.	Driver	AUS (Australia)	BHR (Bahrain)	CHN (China)	AZE (Azerbaijan)	ESP (Spain)	MON (Monaco)	CAN (Canada)	FRA (France)	AUT (Austria)	GBR (United Kingdom)	GER (Germany)	HUN (Hungary)	BEL (Belgium)	ITA (Italy)	SIN (Singapore)	RUS (Russia)	JPN (Japan)	USA (United States)	MEX (Mexico)	BRA (Brazil)	ABU (United Arab Emirates)	Points
1	(United Kingdom) Lewis Hamilton	2^{P}	3	4	1	1^{P}	3	5	1^{P}	Ret	2^{P}	1^{F}	1^{P}	2^{P}	1^{F}	1^{P}	1	1^{P}	3^{P}^{F}	4	1^{P}	1^{P}	408
2	(Germany) Sebastian Vettel	1	1^{P}	8^{P}	4^{P}	4	2	1^{P}	5	3	1^{F}	Ret^{P}	2	1	4	3	3	6^{F}	4	2	6	2^{F}	320
3	(Finland) Kimi Räikkönen	3	Ret	3	2	Ret	4	6	3	2^{F}	3	3	3	Ret	2^{P}	5	4	5	1	3	3	Ret	251
4	(Netherlands) Max Verstappen	6	Ret	5	Ret	3	9^{F}	3^{F}	2	1	15†	4	Ret	3	5	2	5	3	2	1	2	3	249
5	(Finland) Valtteri Bottas	8	2^{F}	2	14^{F}†	2	5	2	7^{F}	Ret^{P}	4	2	5	4^{F}	3	4	2^{P}^{F}	2	5	5^{F}	5^{F}	5	247
6	(Australia) Daniel Ricciardo	4^{F}	Ret	1^{F}	Ret	5^{F}	1^{P}	4	4	Ret	5	Ret	4^{F}	Ret	Ret	6	6	4	Ret	Ret^{P}	4	4	170
7	(Germany) Nico Hülkenberg	7	6	6	Ret	Ret	8	7	9	Ret	6	5	12	Ret	13	10	12	Ret	6	6	Ret	Ret	69
8	(Mexico) Sergio Pérez	11	16	12	3	9	12	14	Ret	7	10	7	14	5	7	16	10	7	8	Ret	10	8	62
9	(Denmark) Kevin Magnussen	Ret	5	10	13	6	13	13	6	5	9	11	7	8	16	18^{F}	8	Ret	DSQ	15	9	10	56
10	(Spain) Carlos Sainz Jr.	10	11	9	5	7	10	8	8	12	Ret	12	9	11	8	8	17	10	7	Ret	12	6	53
11	(Spain) Fernando Alonso	5	7	7	7	8	Ret	Ret	16†	8	8	16†	8	Ret	Ret	7	14	14	Ret	Ret	17	11	50
12	(France) Esteban Ocon	12	10	11	Ret	Ret	6	9	Ret	6	7	8	13	6	6	Ret	9	9	DSQ	11	14	Ret	49
13	(Monaco) Charles Leclerc	13	12	19	6	10	18†	10	10	9	Ret	15	Ret	Ret	11	9	7	Ret	Ret	7	7	7	39
14	(France) Romain Grosjean	Ret	13	17	Ret	Ret	15	12	11	4	Ret	6	10	7	DSQ	15	11	8	Ret	16	8	9	37
15	(France) Pierre Gasly	Ret	4	18	12	Ret	7	11	Ret	11	13	14	6	9	14	13	Ret	11	12	10	13	Ret	29
16	(Belgium) Stoffel Vandoorne	9	8	13	9	Ret	14	16	12	15†	11	13	Ret	15	12	12	16	15	11	8	15	14	12
17	(Sweden) Marcus Ericsson	Ret	9	16	11	13	11	15	13	10	Ret	9	15	10	15	11	13	12	10	9	Ret	Ret	9
18	(Canada) Lance Stroll	14	14	14	8	11	17	Ret	17†	14	12	Ret	17	13	9	14	15	17	14	12	18	13	6
19	(New Zealand) Brendon Hartley	15	17	20†	10	12	19†	Ret	14	Ret	Ret	10	11	14	Ret	17	Ret	13	9	14	11	12	4
20	(Russia) Sergey Sirotkin	Ret	15	15	Ret	14	16	17	15	13	14	Ret	16	12	10	19	18	16	13	13	16	15	1
Pos.	Driver	AUS (Australia)	BHR (Bahrain)	CHN (China)	AZE (Azerbaijan)	ESP (Spain)	MON (Monaco)	CAN (Canada)	FRA (France)	AUT (Austria)	GBR (United Kingdom)	GER (Germany)	HUN (Hungary)	BEL (Belgium)	ITA (Italy)	SIN (Singapore)	RUS (Russia)	JPN (Japan)	USA (United States)	MEX (Mexico)	BRA (Brazil)	ABU (United Arab Emirates)	Points

Key
Colour	Result
Gold	Winner
Silver	Second place
Bronze	Third place
Green	Other points position
Blue	Other classified position
Blue	Not classified, finished (NC)
Purple	Not classified, retired (Ret)
Red	Did not qualify (DNQ)
Black	Disqualified (DSQ)
White	Did not start (DNS)
White	Race cancelled (C)
Blank	Did not practice (DNP)
Blank	Excluded (EX)
Blank	Did not arrive (DNA)
Blank	Withdrawn (WD)
Blank	Did not enter (empty cell)
Annotation	Meaning
P	Pole position
F	Fastest lap

Notes:

- † – Driver did not finish the Grand Prix, but was classified as he completed more than 90% of the race distance.

=== World Constructors' Championship standings ===
Pos.	Constructor	AUS (Australia)	BHR (Bahrain)	CHN (China)	AZE (Azerbaijan)	ESP (Spain)	MON (Monaco)	CAN (Canada)	FRA (France)	AUT (Austria)	GBR (United Kingdom)	GER (Germany)	HUN (Hungary)	BEL (Belgium)	ITA (Italy)	SIN (Singapore)	RUS (Russia)	JPN (Japan)	USA (United States)	MEX (Mexico)	BRA (Brazil)	ABU (United Arab Emirates)	Points
1	(Germany) Mercedes	2^{P}	2^{F}	2	1	1^{P}	3	2	1^{P}	Ret^{P}	2^{P}	1^{F}	1^{P}	2^{P}	1^{F}	1^{P}	1	1^{P}	3^{P}^{F}	4	1^{P}	1^{P}	655
1	(Germany) Mercedes	8	3	4	14^{F}†	2	5	5	7^{F}	Ret	4	2	5	4^{F}	3	4	2^{P}^{F}	2	5	5^{F}	5^{F}	5	655
2	(Italy) Ferrari	1	1^{P}	3	2	4	2	1^{P}	3	2^{F}	1^{F}	3	2	1	2^{P}	3	3	5	1	2	3	2^{F}	571
2	(Italy) Ferrari	3	Ret	8^{P}	4^{P}	Ret	4	6	5	3	3	Ret^{P}	3	Ret	4	5	4	6^{F}	4	3	6	Ret	571
3	(Austria) Red Bull Racing-TAG Heuer	4^{F}	Ret	1^{F}	Ret	3	1^{P}	3^{F}	2	1	5	4	4^{F}	3	5	2	5	3	2	1	2	3	419
3	(Austria) Red Bull Racing-TAG Heuer	6	Ret	5	Ret	5^{F}	9^{F}	4	4	Ret	15†	Ret	Ret	Ret	Ret	6	6	4	Ret	Ret^{P}	4	4	419
4	(France) Renault	7	6	6	5	7	8	7	8	12	6	5	9	11	8	8	12	10	6	6	12	6	122
4	(France) Renault	10	11	9	Ret	Ret	10	8	9	Ret	Ret	12	12	Ret	13	10	17	Ret	7	Ret	Ret	Ret	122
5	(United States) Haas-Ferrari	Ret	5	10	13	6	13	12	6	4	9	6	7	7	16	15	8	8	Ret	15	8	9	93
5	(United States) Haas-Ferrari	Ret	13	17	Ret	Ret	15	13	11	5	Ret	11	10	8	DSQ	18^{F}	11	Ret	DSQ	16	9	10	93
6	(United Kingdom) McLaren-Renault	5	7	7	7	8	14	16	12	8	8	13	8	15	12	7	14	14	11	8	15	11	62
6	(United Kingdom) McLaren-Renault	9	8	13	9	Ret	Ret	Ret	16†	15†	11	16†	Ret	Ret	Ret	12	16	15	Ret	Ret	17	14	62
7	(United Kingdom) Force India-Mercedes (Note: Force India's points were voided and the team excluded from the championship before the Belgian Grand Prix. The team's assets were sold and then re-entered under the same "Force India-Mercedes" name by a newly-formed team; this team was treated as a separate entrant in the Constructors' Championship.)													5	6	16	9	7	8	11	10	8	52
7	(United Kingdom) Force India-Mercedes													6	7	Ret	10	9	DSQ	Ret	14	Ret	52
8	(Switzerland) Sauber-Ferrari	13	9	16	6	10	11	10	10	9	Ret	9	15	10	11	9	7	12	10	7	7	7	48
8	(Switzerland) Sauber-Ferrari	Ret	12	19	11	13	18†	15	13	10	Ret	15	Ret	Ret	15	11	13	Ret	Ret	9	Ret	Ret	48
9	(Italy) Scuderia Toro Rosso-Honda	17	4	18	10	12	7	11	14	11	13	10	6	9	14	13	Ret	11	9	10	11	12	33
9	(Italy) Scuderia Toro Rosso-Honda	Ret	17	20†	12	Ret	19†	Ret	Ret	Ret	Ret	14	11	14	Ret	17	Ret	13	12	14	13	Ret	33
10	(United Kingdom) Williams-Mercedes	14	14	14	8	11	16	17	15	13	12	Ret	16	12	9	14	15	16	13	12	16	13	7
10	(United Kingdom) Williams-Mercedes	Ret	15	15	Ret	14	17	Ret	17†	14	14	Ret	17	13	10	19	18	17	14	13	18	15	7
EX	Force India-Mercedes	11	10	11	3	9	6	9	Ret	6	7	7	13										0 (59) (Note: Sahara Force India F1 Team drivers scored 59 points before the constructor's points were voided)
EX	Force India-Mercedes	12	16	12	Ret	Ret	12	14	Ret	7	10	8	14										0 (59)
Pos.	Constructor	AUS (Australia)	BHR (Bahrain)	CHN (China)	AZE (Azerbaijan)	ESP (Spain)	MON (Monaco)	CAN (Canada)	FRA (France)	AUT (Austria)	GBR (United Kingdom)	GER (Germany)	HUN (Hungary)	BEL (Belgium)	ITA (Italy)	SIN (Singapore)	RUS (Russia)	JPN (Japan)	USA (United States)	MEX (Mexico)	BRA (Brazil)	ABU (United Arab Emirates)	Points

Key
Colour	Result
Gold	Winner
Silver	Second place
Bronze	Third place
Green	Other points position
Blue	Other classified position
Blue	Not classified, finished (NC)
Purple	Not classified, retired (Ret)
Red	Did not qualify (DNQ)
Black	Disqualified (DSQ)
White	Did not start (DNS)
White	Race cancelled (C)
Blank	Did not practice (DNP)
Blank	Excluded (EX)
Blank	Did not arrive (DNA)
Blank	Withdrawn (WD)
Blank	Did not enter (empty cell)
Annotation	Meaning
P	Pole position
F	Fastest lap

Notes:

- † – Driver did not finish the Grand Prix, but was classified as he completed more than 90% of the race distance.
- The standings are sorted by best result, rows are not related to the drivers. In case of tie on points, the best positions achieved determined the outcome.

== See also ==
- 2018 Formula One pre-season testing
