= 2018 Spanish Grand Prix =

Race 5 of 21 in the 2018 Formula One World Championship
← Previous race	Next race →
- Layout of the Circuit de Barcelona-Catalunya

Race details
- Date: 13 May 2018
- Official name: Formula 1 Gran Premio de España Emirates 2018
- Location: Circuit de Barcelona-Catalunya; Montmeló, Spain
- Course: Permanent racing facility
- Course length: 4.655 km (2.892 miles)
- Distance: 66 laps, 307.104 km (190.825 miles)
- Weather: Partially cloudy and dry, 16°C and cold.

Pole position
Driver	(United Kingdom) Lewis Hamilton	Mercedes
- Time: 1:16.173

Fastest lap
Driver	(Australia) Daniel Ricciardo	Red Bull Racing-TAG Heuer
- Time: 1:18.441 on lap 61

Podium
First	(United Kingdom) Lewis Hamilton	Mercedes
Second	(Finland) Valtteri Bottas	Mercedes
Third	(Netherlands) Max Verstappen	Red Bull Racing-TAG Heuer

The 2018 Spanish Grand Prix (formally known as the Formula 1 Gran Premio de España Emirates 2018) was a Formula One motor race that was held on 13 May 2018 at the Circuit de Barcelona-Catalunya in Montmeló, Spain. The race was the 5th round of the 2018 Formula One World Championship and marked the 48th running of the Spanish Grand Prix as a World Championship event since the inaugural season in 1950, and the 28th time that a World Championship round had been held at the Barcelona-Catalunya circuit.

Mercedes driver Lewis Hamilton entered the round with a 4-point lead over Sebastian Vettel in the World Drivers' Championship. In the World Constructors' Championship, Ferrari led Mercedes by 4 points.

== Report ==
=== Background ===
==== Circuit changes ====
Over the winter of 2017–18, modifications were made to the circuit. A new runoff area was installed at turn 12, resulting in the relocation of a grandstand from the entry of turn 12 to the entry of turn 13. Additionally, the track was resurfaced, which saw the Formula One cars break the track record in February testing. These changes were made primarily in response to the demands of MotoGP riders, who expressed their concern over the lack of grip present on the old surface, which had been in place since 2004. Another reason for the improvements was the death of Moto2 rider Luis Salom, who sustained fatal injuries in a crash at turn 12 during the motorcycle race in 2016.

Many Formula One drivers were critical of the new track surface despite the improved ride. Lewis Hamilton was especially critical, stating that the resurfacing was "a waste of money" and that the track had "lost its character" and "is no longer challenging".

==== Chassis updates ====
The race saw several teams, particularly Red Bull Racing and McLaren, introduce their first major chassis updates of the season. Ferrari used the race to trial halo-mounted rear view mirrors. Sebastian Vettel claimed that the design improved visibility but Ferrari's approach was controversial because the mirrors incorporated additional fins, which led to accusations that Ferrari had used the pretense of improving visibility to introduce aerodynamic devices into an area of the car where aerodynamic aids are banned. Following an investigation by race stewards, the practice of mounting mirrors with winglets on the halo was banned from the Monaco Grand Prix, with Ferrari permitted to continue using them in Spain because of the complexity and impracticality of converting the SF71H chassis back to its pre-Barcelona specification in time for the race.

==== Penalties ====
In the week before the race, Williams filed an appeal against a grid penalty handed down to Sergey Sirotkin. Sirotkin had been penalised three grid places for causing avoidable accidents with Sergio Pérez, Fernando Alonso and Nico Hülkenberg on the opening lap of the Azerbaijan Grand Prix. Williams argued that the penalty was too severe compared to penalties awarded for other, similar incidents during the race and that although the contact had forced Sirotkin to retire, Pérez and Alonso were largely unaffected as both went on to score points. Hülkenberg had retired on lap 11 in a separate accident. The appeal was rejected by the race stewards on the grounds that Williams had not provided any new evidence for review and that the ability of other drivers to continue racing did not offset Sirotkin's role in the incidents.

==== Driver changes ====
Robert Kubica replaced Sergey Sirotkin at Williams during the first Free Practice session. Kubica's participation marked his first appearance at a Grand Prix since the 2010 Abu Dhabi Grand Prix and an injury sustained in a rally car accident in 2011 that came close to seeing his arm amputated.

=== Practice ===
Brendon Hartley crashed heavily in third practice (which resulted in his car's rear end snapping in two) and was unable to take part in qualifying, but was cleared to race.

=== Qualifying ===
Lewis Hamilton took pole position with a time of 1:16.173, a new track record. Valtteri Bottas completed the front row, giving Mercedes their first front row lockout of the season. McLaren made Q3 for the first time in 2018, with Fernando Alonso qualifying in P8. Nico Hulkenberg was out in Q1 after having a gearbox problem. In Q3, some of the top drivers set their laps on the soft tyre, rather than the supersoft, after finding it difficult to get the supersoft in their optimal operating window.

=== Race ===
Before the race, it was indicated that there was an 80% chance of rain during the race, although this never came to fruition. The front runners got away well at the start, but at Turn 3, Romain Grosjean spun across the track, creating a smokescreen from his rear tyres and eliminating Nico Hulkenberg and Pierre Gasly in the process. This caused a safety car that remained out until Lap 6. On Lap 25, Kimi Raikkonen lost power in his car and retired with an engine issue. On Lap 40, Esteban Ocon retired with an engine problem in his Force India, bringing out the Virtual Safety Car. Vettel pitted under the VSC, rejoining in P4 behind Max Verstappen behind whom he remained until the chequered flag. As this VSC ended, Max Verstappen collided with the rear of Lance Stroll's Williams, causing endplate damage to Verstappen's front wing. The front wing, however, was structurally intact, and so Verstappen did not need to pit. On Lap 47, Stoffel Vandoorne retired at the pit exit with mechanical issues. Hamilton won the race, having been a long way ahead of anyone the entire race, and leading home the first 1-2 of the season for Mercedes. Hamilton extended his championship lead to 17 points and Mercedes gained the lead of the constructors championship, leading Ferrari by 26 points.

=== Post-race ===
Romain Grosjean was given a 3 place grid penalty for the next race in Monaco, for his role in causing the first lap collision.

== Classification ==
=== Qualifying ===
Pos.	No.	Driver	Constructor	Qualifying times			Final grid
Pos.	No.	Driver	Constructor	Q1	Q2	Q3	Final grid
1	44	(United Kingdom) Lewis Hamilton	Mercedes	1:17.633	1:17.166	1:16.173	1
2	77	(Finland) Valtteri Bottas	Mercedes	1:17.674	1:17.111	1:16.213	2
3	5	(Germany) Sebastian Vettel	Ferrari	1:17.031	1:16.802	1:16.305	3
4	7	(Finland) Kimi Räikkönen	Ferrari	1:17.483	1:17.071	1:16.612	4
5	33	(Netherlands) Max Verstappen	Red Bull Racing-TAG Heuer	1:17.411	1:17.266	1:16.816	5
6	3	(Australia) Daniel Ricciardo	Red Bull Racing-TAG Heuer	1:17.623	1:17.638	1:16.818	6
7	20	(Denmark) Kevin Magnussen	Haas-Ferrari	1:18.169	1:17.618	1:17.676	7
8	14	(Spain) Fernando Alonso	McLaren-Renault	1:18.276	1:18.100	1:17.721	8
9	55	(Spain) Carlos Sainz Jr.	Renault	1:18.480	1:17.803	1:17.790	9
10	8	(France) Romain Grosjean	Haas-Ferrari	1:18.305	1:17.699	1:17.835	10
11	2	(Belgium) Stoffel Vandoorne	McLaren-Renault	1:18.885	1:18.323		11
12	10	(France) Pierre Gasly	Scuderia Toro Rosso-Honda	1:18.550	1:18.463		12
13	31	(France) Esteban Ocon	Force India-Mercedes	1:18.813	1:18.696		13
14	16	(Monaco) Charles Leclerc	Sauber-Ferrari	1:18.661	1:18.910		14
15	11	(Mexico) Sergio Pérez	Force India-Mercedes	1:18.740	1:19.098		15
16	27	(Germany) Nico Hülkenberg	Renault	1:18.923			16
17	9	(Sweden) Marcus Ericsson	Sauber-Ferrari	1:19.493			17
18	35	(Russia) Sergey Sirotkin	Williams-Mercedes	1:19.695			19^{1}
19	18	(Canada) Lance Stroll	Williams-Mercedes	1:20.225			18
107% time: 1:22.423
—	28	(New Zealand) Brendon Hartley	Scuderia Toro Rosso-Honda	No time			20^{2}

Notes

- ^1 – Sergey Sirotkin received a three-place grid penalty for causing a collision in the previous round.
- ^2 – Brendon Hartley failed to set a Q1 time within the 107% requirement and raced at the stewards' discretion. He also received a five-place grid penalty for an unscheduled gearbox change.

=== Race ===
Pos.	No.	Driver	Constructor	Laps	Time/Retired	Grid	Points
1	44	(United Kingdom) Lewis Hamilton	Mercedes	66	1:35:29.972	1	25
2	77	(Finland) Valtteri Bottas	Mercedes	66	+20.593	2	18
3	33	(Netherlands) Max Verstappen	Red Bull Racing-TAG Heuer	66	+26.873	5	15
4	5	(Germany) Sebastian Vettel	Ferrari	66	+27.584	3	12
5	3	(Australia) Daniel Ricciardo	Red Bull Racing-TAG Heuer	66	+50.058	6	10
6	20	(Denmark) Kevin Magnussen	Haas-Ferrari	65	+1 lap	7	8
7	55	(Spain) Carlos Sainz Jr.	Renault	65	+1 lap	9	6
8	14	(Spain) Fernando Alonso	McLaren-Renault	65	+1 lap	8	4
9	11	(Mexico) Sergio Pérez	Force India-Mercedes	64	+2 laps	15	2
10	16	(Monaco) Charles Leclerc	Sauber-Ferrari	64	+2 laps	14	1
11	18	(Canada) Lance Stroll	Williams-Mercedes	64	+2 laps	18	
12	28	(New Zealand) Brendon Hartley	Scuderia Toro Rosso-Honda	64	+2 laps	20	
13	9	(Sweden) Marcus Ericsson	Sauber-Ferrari	64	+2 laps	17	
14	35	(Russia) Sergey Sirotkin	Williams-Mercedes	63	+3 laps	19	
Ret	2	(Belgium) Stoffel Vandoorne	McLaren-Renault	45	Gearbox	11	
Ret	31	(France) Esteban Ocon	Force India-Mercedes	38	Oil leak	13	
Ret	7	(Finland) Kimi Räikkönen	Ferrari	25	Turbocharger	4	
Ret	8	(France) Romain Grosjean	Haas-Ferrari	0	Spin/Collision	10	
Ret	10	(France) Pierre Gasly	Scuderia Toro Rosso-Honda	0	Collision	12	
Ret	27	(Germany) Nico Hülkenberg	Renault	0	Collision	16	

== Championship standings after the race ==
Drivers' Championship standings

	Pos.	Driver	Points
	1	(United Kingdom) Lewis Hamilton	95
	2	(Germany) Sebastian Vettel	78
1	3	(Finland) Valtteri Bottas	58
1	4	(Finland) Kimi Räikkönen	48
	5	(Australia) Daniel Ricciardo	47

Constructors' Championship standings

	Pos.	Constructor	Points
1	1	(Germany) Mercedes	153
1	2	(Italy) Ferrari	126
	3	(Austria) Red Bull Racing-TAG Heuer	80
1	4	(France) Renault	41
1	5	(United Kingdom) McLaren-Renault	40

- Note: Only the top five positions are included for both sets of standings.

== See also ==
- 2018 Barcelona Formula 2 round
- 2018 Barcelona GP3 Series round

Previous race: 2018 Azerbaijan Grand Prix	FIA Formula One World Championship; 2018 season	Next race: 2018 Monaco Grand Prix
Previous race: 2017 Spanish Grand Prix	Spanish Grand Prix	Next race: 2019 Spanish Grand Prix
