= 2018 Chinese Grand Prix =

2018 Formula 1 race

Race 3 of 21 in the 2018 Formula One World Championship
← Previous race	Next race →
- Layout of the Shanghai International Circuit

Race details
- Date: 15 April 2018
- Official name: Formula 1 2018 Heineken Chinese Grand Prix
- Location: Shanghai International Circuit, Shanghai, China
- Course: Permanent racing facility
- Course length: 5.451 km (3.387 miles)
- Distance: 56 laps, 305.066 km (189.559 miles)
- Weather: Sunny

Pole position
Driver	(Germany) Sebastian Vettel	Ferrari
- Time: 1:31.095

Fastest lap
Driver	(Australia) Daniel Ricciardo	Red Bull Racing-TAG Heuer
- Time: 1:35.785 on lap 55

Podium
First	(Australia) Daniel Ricciardo	Red Bull Racing-TAG Heuer
Second	(Finland) Valtteri Bottas	Mercedes
Third	(Finland) Kimi Räikkönen	Ferrari

The 2018 Chinese Grand Prix (formally known as the Formula 1 2018 Heineken Chinese Grand Prix) was a Formula One motor race that took place on 15 April 2018 at the Shanghai International Circuit in Shanghai, China. The race was the 3rd round of the 2018 FIA Formula One World Championship, and marked the 15th time that the Chinese Grand Prix has been run as a round of the Formula One World Championship.

Mercedes driver Lewis Hamilton was the defending race winner. Sebastian Vettel entered the round with a 17-point lead over Hamilton in the World Drivers' Championship. His team, Ferrari, led Mercedes by ten points in the World Constructors' Championship. Vettel qualified on pole position, and in doing so recorded Ferrari's first pole position in China in fourteen years. Daniel Ricciardo won the race ahead of Valtteri Bottas and Kimi Räikkönen. Vettel's championship lead was cut to nine points when he finished in eighth place, the result of contact with Max Verstappen late in the race.

== Report ==
=== Practice ===
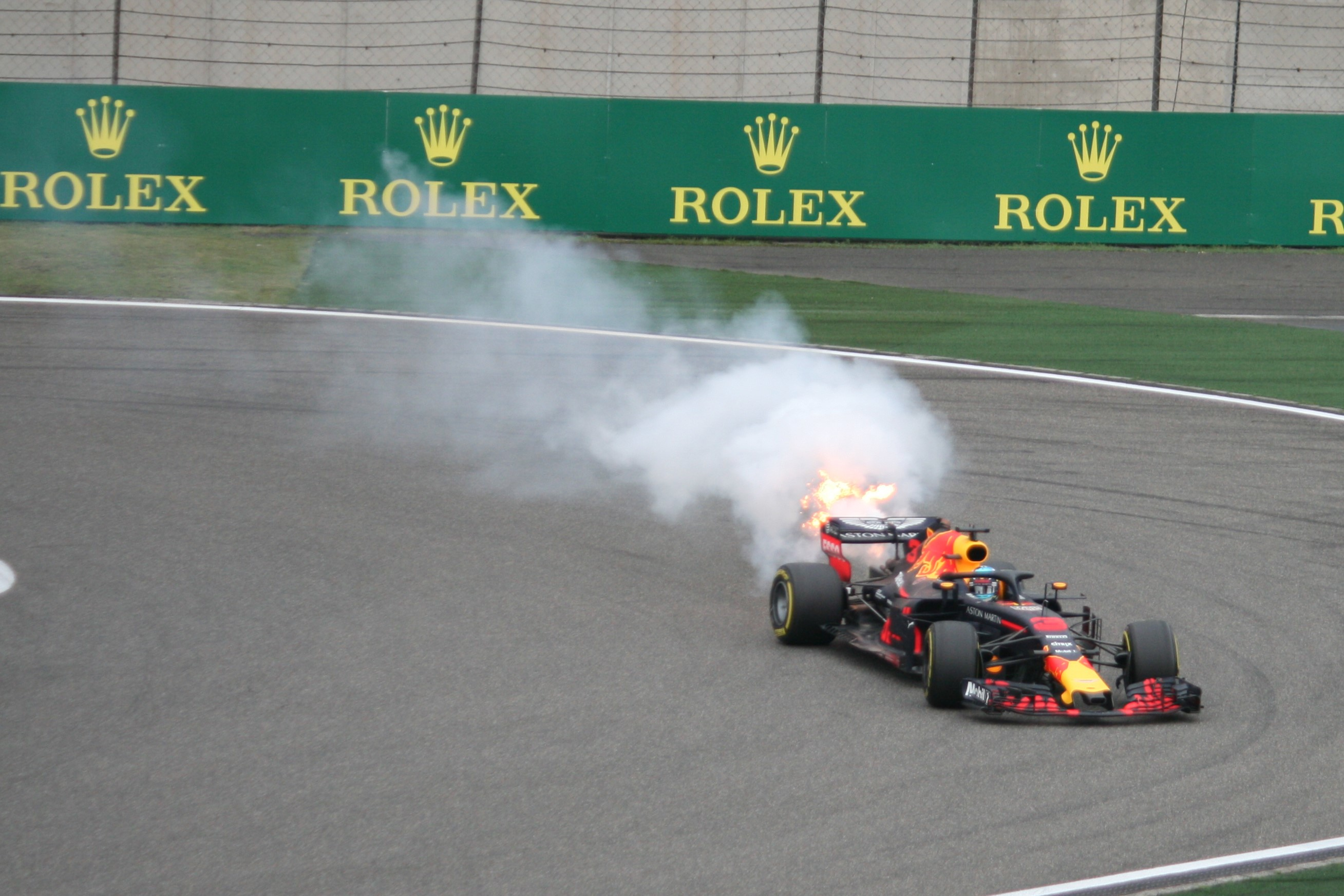
Daniel Ricciardo suffered power unit failure during FP3

Lewis Hamilton was quickest in FP1 and FP2. Sebastian Vettel was quickest in FP3. During FP3, Daniel Ricciardo's turbo failed, requiring a full rebuild.

=== Qualifying ===
Daniel Ricciardo's pit crew, still frantically assembling his Red Bull engine and car as qualifying began, were able to get his car out in Q1 with just over three minutes left in the session. With his first and only possible hot lap in Q1, he finished the session in P14. Charles Leclerc, meanwhile, spun his Sauber, and failed to make it out of Q1. Marcus Ericsson was given a 5 place grid penalty for the race, and 3 points on his super license, for ignoring the double yellow flags waved for Leclerc. After qualifying P6 in Bahrain, Pierre Gasly also failed to make it out of Q1.

Ferrari locked out the front row of the grid for the second consecutive race, the first time since 2006 that the team had achieved this feat. Sebastian Vettel qualified on pole position with a time of 1:31.095, a new track record. Mercedes locked out the second row of the grid, and Red Bull the third.

=== Race ===
Polesitter Sebastian Vettel got away well at the start, however his teammate Kimi Räikkönen lost positions, being overtaken by Bottas in Turn 1, and then Verstappen a few corners later. Hamilton fell back to 5th, whilst Ricciardo held 6th. After the first pit stops, Bottas managed to undercut Vettel and subsequently overtook Kimi Räikkönen, who had not yet stopped, for the lead, around the outside in Turn 1. After Bottas blocked off Räikkönen, Vettel took advantage to take second place.

On Lap 30, the Toro Rosso cars of Brendon Hartley and Pierre Gasly collided at the hairpin. Gasly was awarded a 10-second penalty and the debris left on the track resulted in the safety car being brought out. This was a critical turning point for the race, as during the safety car period, both Red Bull cars pitted for fresh tyres on the same lap immediately. Mercedes had an opportunity to bring Hamilton in, but instead left him out to preserve track position. Bottas maintained the lead of the race at the safety car restart. Max Verstappen ran wide on Lap 39 whilst battling with Lewis Hamilton for third place, losing a position to Ricciardo, who had previously overtaken Räikkönen. Both Red Bulls then overtook Hamilton, two laps apart, and then Ricciardo overtook Vettel for P2. On Lap 43, Max Verstappen shunted Sebastian Vettel off the track at the hairpin, resulting in both drivers spinning off the track and Vettel losing positions, due to a damaged floor. Verstappen was awarded a 10-second penalty for the incident. On Lap 45 Ricciardo overtook Bottas for the lead of the race, which he would retain until the chequered flag. On the penultimate lap, Vettel was overtaken by Fernando Alonso meaning he would finish in P8.

Ricciardo celebrated by drinking champagne from his boot on the podium. Chris Gent, Red Bull team number one mechanic joined him on the podium to receive the winning manufacturer's award.

== Classification ==
=== Qualifying ===
Pos.	Car no.	Driver	Constructor	Qualifying times			Final grid
Pos.	Car no.	Driver	Constructor	Q1	Q2	Q3	Final grid
1	5	(Germany) Sebastian Vettel	Ferrari	1:32.171	1:32.385	1:31.095	1
2	7	(Finland) Kimi Räikkönen	Ferrari	1:32.474	1:32.286	1:31.182	2
3	77	(Finland) Valtteri Bottas	Mercedes	1:32.921	1:32.063	1:31.625	3
4	44	(United Kingdom) Lewis Hamilton	Mercedes	1:33.283	1:31.914	1:31.675	4
5	33	(Netherlands) Max Verstappen	Red Bull Racing-TAG Heuer	1:32.932	1:32.809	1:31.796	5
6	3	(Australia) Daniel Ricciardo	Red Bull Racing-TAG Heuer	1:33.877	1:32.688	1:31.948	6
7	27	(Germany) Nico Hülkenberg	Renault	1:33.545	1:32.494	1:32.532	7
8	11	(Mexico) Sergio Pérez	Force India-Mercedes	1:33.464	1:32.931	1:32.758	8
9	55	(Spain) Carlos Sainz Jr.	Renault	1:33.315	1:32.970	1:32.819	9
10	8	(France) Romain Grosjean	Haas-Ferrari	1:33.238	1:32.524	1:32.855	10
11	20	(Denmark) Kevin Magnussen	Haas-Ferrari	1:33.359	1:32.986	N/A	11
12	31	(France) Esteban Ocon	Force India-Mercedes	1:33.585	1:33.057	N/A	12
13	14	(Spain) Fernando Alonso	McLaren-Renault	1:33.428	1:33.232	N/A	13
14	2	(Belgium) Stoffel Vandoorne	McLaren-Renault	1:33.824	1:33.505	N/A	14
15	28	(New Zealand) Brendon Hartley	Scuderia Toro Rosso-Honda	1:34.013	1:33.795	N/A	15
16	35	(Russia) Sergey Sirotkin	Williams-Mercedes	1:34.062	N/A	N/A	16
17	10	(France) Pierre Gasly	Scuderia Toro Rosso-Honda	1:34.101	N/A	N/A	17
18	18	(Canada) Lance Stroll	Williams-Mercedes	1:34.285	N/A	N/A	18
19	16	(Monaco) Charles Leclerc	Sauber-Ferrari	1:34.454	N/A	N/A	19
20	9	(Sweden) Marcus Ericsson	Sauber-Ferrari	1:34.914	N/A	N/A	20^{1}
107% time: 1:38.622

Notes

- ^1 – Marcus Ericsson was given a five-place grid penalty for ignoring yellow flags during qualifying.

=== Race ===
Pos.	No.	Driver	Constructor	Laps	Time/Retired	Grid	Points
1	3	(Australia) Daniel Ricciardo	Red Bull Racing-TAG Heuer	56	1:35:36.380	6	25
2	77	(Finland) Valtteri Bottas	Mercedes	56	+8.894	3	18
3	7	(Finland) Kimi Räikkönen	Ferrari	56	+9.637	2	15
4	44	(United Kingdom) Lewis Hamilton	Mercedes	56	+16.985	4	12
5	33	(Netherlands) Max Verstappen	Red Bull Racing-TAG Heuer	56	+20.436^{1}	5	10
6	27	(Germany) Nico Hülkenberg	Renault	56	+21.052	7	8
7	14	(Spain) Fernando Alonso	McLaren-Renault	56	+30.639	13	6
8	5	(Germany) Sebastian Vettel	Ferrari	56	+35.286	1	4
9	55	(Spain) Carlos Sainz Jr.	Renault	56	+35.763	9	2
10	20	(Denmark) Kevin Magnussen	Haas-Ferrari	56	+39.594	11	1
11	31	(France) Esteban Ocon	Force India-Mercedes	56	+44.050	12	
12	11	(Mexico) Sergio Pérez	Force India-Mercedes	56	+44.725	8	
13	2	(Belgium) Stoffel Vandoorne	McLaren-Renault	56	+49.373	14	
14	18	(Canada) Lance Stroll	Williams-Mercedes	56	+55.490	18	
15	35	(Russia) Sergey Sirotkin	Williams-Mercedes	56	+58.241	16	
16	9	(Sweden) Marcus Ericsson	Sauber-Ferrari	56	+1:02.604	20	
17	8	(France) Romain Grosjean	Haas-Ferrari	56	+1:05.296	10	
18	10	(France) Pierre Gasly	Scuderia Toro Rosso-Honda	56	+1:06.330^{2}	17	
19	16	(Monaco) Charles Leclerc	Sauber-Ferrari	56	+1:22.575	19	
20^{3}	28	(New Zealand) Brendon Hartley	Scuderia Toro Rosso-Honda	51	Gearbox	15	

Notes

- ^1 – Max Verstappen originally finished in fourth place, but had ten seconds added to his race time for causing an avoidable collision.
- ^2 – Pierre Gasly originally finished in fifteenth place, but had ten seconds added to his race time for causing an avoidable collision.
- ^3 – Brendon Hartley did not finish the race, but was classified as he completed 90% of the winner's race distance.

== Championship standings after the race ==
Drivers' Championship standings

	Pos.	Driver	Points
	1	(Germany) Sebastian Vettel	54
	2	(United Kingdom) Lewis Hamilton	45
	3	(Finland) Valtteri Bottas	40
3	4	(Australia) Daniel Ricciardo	37
	5	(Finland) Kimi Räikkönen	30

Constructors' Championship standings

	Pos.	Constructor	Points
1	1	(Germany) Mercedes	85
1	2	(Italy) Ferrari	84
1	3	(Austria) Red Bull Racing-TAG Heuer	55
1	4	(United Kingdom) McLaren-Renault	28
	5	(France) Renault	25

- Note: Only the top five positions are included for both sets of standings.

Previous race: 2018 Bahrain Grand Prix	FIA Formula One World Championship; 2018 season	Next race: 2018 Azerbaijan Grand Prix
Previous race: 2017 Chinese Grand Prix	Chinese Grand Prix	Next race: 2019 Chinese Grand Prix
