= 2018 Monaco Grand Prix =

6th round of the 2018 Formula One season

Race 6 of 21 in the 2018 Formula One World Championship
← Previous race	Next race →
- Layout of the Circuit de Monte Carlo, Monaco

Race details
- Date: 27 May 2018
- Official name: Formula 1 Grand Prix de Monaco 2018
- Location: Circuit de Monaco; La Condamine and Monte Carlo, Monaco
- Course: Street circuit
- Course length: 3.337 km (2.074 miles)
- Distance: 78 laps, 260.286 km (161.734 miles)
- Weather: Sunny

Pole position
Driver	(Australia) Daniel Ricciardo	Red Bull Racing-TAG Heuer
- Time: 1:10.810

Fastest lap
Driver	(Netherlands) Max Verstappen	Red Bull Racing-TAG Heuer
- Time: 1:14.260 on lap 60

Podium
First	(Australia) Daniel Ricciardo	Red Bull Racing-TAG Heuer
Second	(Germany) Sebastian Vettel	Ferrari
Third	(United Kingdom) Lewis Hamilton	Mercedes

The 2018 Monaco Grand Prix (formally known as the Formula 1 Grand Prix de Monaco 2018) was a Formula One motor race that was held on 27 May 2018 at the Circuit de Monaco, a street circuit that runs through the Principality of Monaco. It was the 6th round of the 2018 FIA Formula One World Championship, the 76th time the Monaco Grand Prix had been held, and the 65th time it had been a round of the Formula One World Championship since the inception of the series in 1950. It was the last victory for Daniel Ricciardo until the 2021 Italian Grand Prix.

The race was won by Daniel Ricciardo in Red Bull, with Sebastian Vettel in Ferrari coming second. Lewis Hamilton in Mercedes finished third, maintaining the championship lead over Vettel. Mercedes also led in the Constructors' Championship ahead of Ferrari.

== Report ==
=== Background ===
==== Tyres ====
The race marked the competitive début of Pirelli's new hypersoft tyre compound.

==== Chassis updates ====
Following controversy over the use of winglets above halo-mounted rear view mirrors at the previous round in Spain, the FIA banned the winglets ahead of the race weekend.

==== Penalties ====
Romain Grosjean was handed a three-place grid penalty for causing a collision on the opening lap of the Spanish Grand Prix. Max Verstappen received a 5 place grid penalty for an unscheduled gearbox change, and a 10 place grid penalty for use of a third MGU-K, although this made no difference to his starting position, as he already was at the back of the grid.

=== Practice ===
Daniel Ricciardo was fastest across all three practice sessions, improving his time in each successive session. In FP3, Max Verstappen crashed heavily at the Turn 16, meaning his car was damaged beyond repair for qualifying.

=== Qualifying ===
Max Verstappen was unable to compete in qualifying as his mechanics were unable to repair the car in time after a crash in the final practice session. Daniel Ricciardo set a new qualifying lap record to take pole position for the race. Red Bull capped both ends of the grid, Ricciardo starting first and Verstappen starting last. Pierre Gasly made Q3 for the second time, however his teammate, Brendon Hartley, after showing promise with P7 in FP3, qualified in P16 after being held up in traffic as well as being unhappy with the balance in his car.

=== Race ===
Ricciardo led going into the first corner with the top 6 staying in the same order. On lap 28, Ricciardo, still leading the race, complained of a loss of power to the team. Ricciardo was left to manage a wounded car for the remaining 50 laps of the race, with what was later revealed to be an MGU-K failure (giving him 25% less horsepower than usual), and with only six out of eight gears functioning. For the rest of the race he came under pressure from Sebastian Vettel, however due to dirty air and the track being difficult to pass, Vettel was unable to attack Ricciardo. Vettel lost a lot of time after Stoffel Vandoorne, around a lap behind Vettel and Ricciardo, came in between them both after pitting for a second time.

Sergey Sirotkin was given a 10-second stop-go penalty after his tyres were not fitted to the car at the 3 minute signal. On lap 53 Fernando Alonso retired at Sainte-Dévote due to gearbox problems, his first retirement of the 2018 season. A virtual safety car came out on lap 73 when Charles Leclerc's left front brake disc failed just before the Nouvelle Chicane, causing him to crash into the back of Brendon Hartley. Both drivers were forced to retire due to damage. This was the first Monaco Grand Prix since 2009 where a (full) safety car did not make an appearance, although there was a brief virtual safety car period. It was Ricciardo's final victory for Red Bull Racing and his most recent until the 2021 Italian Grand Prix.

=== Post race ===
After the race Hamilton and Alonso both complained that this was "one of the most boring races ever"; drivers were lapping several seconds a lap slower than they could have been to conserve tyres and avoid making a second pit-stop. Alonso also pointed to the spread out field, "as there were barely any yellow flags or safety cars."

== Classification ==
=== Qualifying ===
Pos.	No.	Driver	Constructor	Qualifying times			Final grid
Pos.	No.	Driver	Constructor	Q1	Q2	Q3	Final grid
1	3	(Australia) Daniel Ricciardo	Red Bull Racing-TAG Heuer	1:12.013	1:11.278	1:10.810	1
2	5	(Germany) Sebastian Vettel	Ferrari	1:12.415	1:11.518	1:11.039	2
3	44	(United Kingdom) Lewis Hamilton	Mercedes	1:12.460	1:11.584	1:11.232	3
4	7	(Finland) Kimi Räikkönen	Ferrari	1:12.639	1:11.391	1:11.266	4
5	77	(Finland) Valtteri Bottas	Mercedes	1:12.434	1:12.002	1:11.441	5
6	31	(France) Esteban Ocon	Force India-Mercedes	1:13.028	1:12.188	1:12.061	6
7	14	(Spain) Fernando Alonso	McLaren-Renault	1:12.657	1:12.269	1:12.110	7
8	55	(Spain) Carlos Sainz Jr.	Renault	1:12.950	1:12.286	1:12.130	8
9	11	(Mexico) Sergio Pérez	Force India-Mercedes	1:12.848	1:12.194	1:12.154	9
10	10	(France) Pierre Gasly	Scuderia Toro Rosso-Honda	1:12.941	1:12.313	1:12.221	10
11	27	(Germany) Nico Hülkenberg	Renault	1:13.065	1:12.411		11
12	2	(Belgium) Stoffel Vandoorne	McLaren-Renault	1:12.463	1:12.440		12
13	35	(Russia) Sergey Sirotkin	Williams-Mercedes	1:12.706	1:12.521		13
14	16	(Monaco) Charles Leclerc	Sauber-Ferrari	1:12.829	1:12.714		14
15	8	(France) Romain Grosjean	Haas-Ferrari	1:12.930	1:12.728		18^{a}
16	28	(New Zealand) Brendon Hartley	Scuderia Toro Rosso-Honda	1:13.179			15
17	9	(Sweden) Marcus Ericsson	Sauber-Ferrari	1:13.265			16
18	18	(Canada) Lance Stroll	Williams-Mercedes	1:13.323			17
19	20	(Denmark) Kevin Magnussen	Haas-Ferrari	1:13.393			19
107% time: 1:17.053
—	33	(Netherlands) Max Verstappen	Red Bull Racing-TAG Heuer	No time			20^{b}

Notes

- ^a – Romain Grosjean received a three-place grid penalty for causing a collision in the previous round.
- ^b – Max Verstappen failed to set a Q1 time within the 107% requirement and was allowed to start the race at the stewards' discretion. He also received a 15-place grid penalty: five places for an unscheduled gearbox change and ten places for use of a third MGU-K.

=== Race ===
Pos.	No.	Driver	Constructor	Laps	Time/Retired	Grid	Points
1	3	(Australia) Daniel Ricciardo	Red Bull Racing-TAG Heuer	78	1:42:54.807	1	25
2	5	(Germany) Sebastian Vettel	Ferrari	78	+7.336	2	18
3	44	(United Kingdom) Lewis Hamilton	Mercedes	78	+17.013	3	15
4	7	(Finland) Kimi Räikkönen	Ferrari	78	+18.127	4	12
5	77	(Finland) Valtteri Bottas	Mercedes	78	+18.822	5	10
6	31	(France) Esteban Ocon	Force India-Mercedes	78	+23.667	6	8
7	10	(France) Pierre Gasly	Scuderia Toro Rosso-Honda	78	+24.331	10	6
8	27	(Germany) Nico Hülkenberg	Renault	78	+24.839	11	4
9	33	(Netherlands) Max Verstappen	Red Bull Racing-TAG Heuer	78	+25.317	20	2
10	55	(Spain) Carlos Sainz Jr.	Renault	78	+1:09.013	8	1
11	9	(Sweden) Marcus Ericsson	Sauber-Ferrari	78	+1:09.864	16	
12	11	(Mexico) Sergio Pérez	Force India-Mercedes	78	+1:10.461	9	
13	20	(Denmark) Kevin Magnussen	Haas-Ferrari	78	+1:14.823	19	
14	2	(Belgium) Stoffel Vandoorne	McLaren-Renault	77	+1 lap	12	
15	8	(France) Romain Grosjean	Haas-Ferrari	77	+1 lap	18	
16	35	(Russia) Sergey Sirotkin	Williams-Mercedes	77	+1 lap	13	
17	18	(Canada) Lance Stroll	Williams-Mercedes	76	+2 laps	17	
18^{1}	16	(Monaco) Charles Leclerc	Sauber-Ferrari	70	Collision	14	
19^{1}	28	(New Zealand) Brendon Hartley	Scuderia Toro Rosso-Honda	70	Collision damage	15	
Ret	14	(Spain) Fernando Alonso	McLaren-Renault	52	Gearbox	7	

Notes

- ^1 – Charles Leclerc and Brendon Hartley did not finish the Grand Prix, but were classified as they completed more than 90% of the race distance. Although Hartley completed his 70th lap before Leclerc, Hartley is classified behind Leclerc due to a 5-second time penalty for speeding in the pit lane.

== Championship standings after the race ==
Drivers' Championship standings

	Pos.	Driver	Points
	1	(United Kingdom) Lewis Hamilton	110
	2	(Germany) Sebastian Vettel	96
2	3	(Australia) Daniel Ricciardo	72
1	4	(Finland) Valtteri Bottas	68
1	5	(Finland) Kimi Räikkönen	60

Constructors' Championship standings

Pos.	Constructor	Points
1	(Germany) Mercedes	178
2	(Italy) Ferrari	156
3	(Austria) Red Bull Racing-TAG Heuer	107
4	(France) Renault	46
5	(United Kingdom) McLaren-Renault	40

- Note: Only the top five positions are included for both sets of standings.

== See also ==
- 2018 Monaco FIA Formula 2 round

Previous race: 2018 Spanish Grand Prix	FIA Formula One World Championship; 2018 season	Next race: 2018 Canadian Grand Prix
Previous race: 2017 Monaco Grand Prix	Monaco Grand Prix	Next race: 2019 Monaco Grand Prix
