= 2018 Hungarian Grand Prix =

Race 12 of 21 in the 2018 Formula One World Championship
← Previous race	Next race →
- Layout of the Hungaroring circuit

Race details
- Date: 29 July 2018
- Official name: Formula 1 Rolex Magyar Nagydíj 2018
- Location: Hungaroring; Mogyoród, Hungary
- Course: Permanent racing facility
- Course length: 4.381 km (2.722 miles)
- Distance: 70 laps, 306.630 km (190.531 miles)
- Weather: Sunny

Pole position
Driver	(United Kingdom) Lewis Hamilton	Mercedes
- Time: 1:35.658

Fastest lap
Driver	(Australia) Daniel Ricciardo	Red Bull Racing-TAG Heuer
- Time: 1:20.012 on lap 46

Podium
First	(United Kingdom) Lewis Hamilton	Mercedes
Second	(Germany) Sebastian Vettel	Ferrari
Third	(Finland) Kimi Räikkönen	Ferrari

The 2018 Hungarian Grand Prix (formally the Formula 1 Rolex Magyar Nagydíj 2018) was a Formula One motor race held on 29 July 2018 at the Hungaroring in Mogyoród, Hungary. The race was the 12th round of the 2018 Formula One World Championship and marked the 34th running of the Hungarian Grand Prix, and the 33rd time the race had been run as a World Championship event since the inaugural season in 1950.

Mercedes driver Lewis Hamilton entered the round with a 17-point lead over Sebastian Vettel in the Drivers' Championship, and extended it to 24 points. In the World Constructors' Championship, Mercedes led Ferrari by 8 points before the race, and they further extended their lead to 10 points.

== Report ==
=== Background ===
The Ferrari crew wore black armbands in honour of former Ferrari chairman Sergio Marchionne, who died following complications from surgery on 25 July 2018. Black stripes were also incorporated into the cars of Ferrari as well as engine customer teams Haas and Sauber in tribute to Marchionne.

=== Race ===
Hamilton led away from pole and got away well with Bottas in close pursuit. Max Verstappen retired on lap 5 following an engine failure, with a brief virtual safety car period to remove his car. Hamilton pitted from the lead on lap 25, Vettel stayed out and didn't make his pit stop until lap 39, and was unable to get out ahead of Bottas. By lap 65, Vettel and Räikkönen had caught up to Bottas on fresher tyres. Vettel went for an overtake at turn 2 and moved into second place, Bottas made contact trying to defend, damaging his front wing and letting Räikkönen through. Three laps later, Daniel Ricciardo attempted an overtake on Bottas, the two drivers also made contact and picked up damage. Bottas gave the position up on the final lap, finishing in fifth. He was later handed a 10-second time penalty for causing a collision, this did not change his finishing position. Hamilton won the race, seventeen seconds ahead of Vettel, with Räikkönen finishing in third.

=== Post-race ===
Mercedes team principal Toto Wolff praised Bottas for holding off the Ferraris that resulted in a large finishing gap to Hamilton, calling him a "sensational wingman". Bottas reacted by saying that being called a wingman "hurts", and that he could have finished better if not for his tyre wear, and that he would speak to team management to discuss the issue. Wolff later clarified his remarks, stating that there is no number one or number two driver, and that Bottas drove a sensational race to help Hamilton.

== Classification ==
=== Qualifying ===
Pos.	No.	Driver	Constructor	Qualifying times			Final grid
Pos.	No.	Driver	Constructor	Q1	Q2	Q3	Final grid
1	44	(United Kingdom) Lewis Hamilton	Mercedes	1:17.419	1:31.242	1:35.658	1
2	77	(Finland) Valtteri Bottas	Mercedes	1:17.123	1:32.081	1:35.918	2
3	7	(Finland) Kimi Räikkönen	Ferrari	1:17.526	1:32.762	1:36.186	3
4	5	(Germany) Sebastian Vettel	Ferrari	1:16.666	1:28.636	1:36.210	4
5	55	(Spain) Carlos Sainz Jr.	Renault	1:17.829	1:30.771	1:36.743	5
6	10	(France) Pierre Gasly	Scuderia Toro Rosso-Honda	1:18.577	1:31.286	1:37.591	6
7	33	(Netherlands) Max Verstappen	Red Bull Racing-TAG Heuer	1:16.940	1:31.178	1:38.032	7
8	28	(New Zealand) Brendon Hartley	Scuderia Toro Rosso-Honda	1:18.429	1:32.590	1:38.128	8
9	20	(Denmark) Kevin Magnussen	Haas-Ferrari	1:18.314	1:32.968	1:39.858	9
10	8	(France) Romain Grosjean	Haas-Ferrari	1:17.901	1:33.650	1:40.593	10
11	14	(Spain) Fernando Alonso	McLaren-Renault	1:18.208	1:35.214		11
12	3	(Australia) Daniel Ricciardo	Red Bull Racing-TAG Heuer	1:18.540	1:36.442		12
13	27	(Germany) Nico Hülkenberg	Renault	1:17.905	1:36.506		13
14	9	(Sweden) Marcus Ericsson	Sauber-Ferrari	1:18.641	1:37.075		14
15	18	(Canada) Lance Stroll	Williams-Mercedes	1:18.560	No time		PL^{1}
16	2	(Belgium) Stoffel Vandoorne	McLaren-Renault	1:18.782			15
17	16	(Monaco) Charles Leclerc	Sauber-Ferrari	1:18.817			16
18	31	(France) Esteban Ocon	Force India-Mercedes	1:19.142			17
19	11	(Mexico) Sergio Pérez	Force India-Mercedes	1:19.200			18
20	35	(Russia) Sergey Sirotkin	Williams-Mercedes	1:19.301			19
107% time: 1:22.032

Notes

- ^1 – Lance Stroll was required to start from the pit lane after changing his front wing.

=== Race ===
Pos.	No.	Driver	Constructor	Laps	Time/Retired	Grid	Points
1	44	(United Kingdom) Lewis Hamilton	Mercedes	70	1:37:16.427	1	25
2	5	(Germany) Sebastian Vettel	Ferrari	70	+17.123	4	18
3	7	(Finland) Kimi Räikkönen	Ferrari	70	+20.101	3	15
4	3	(Australia) Daniel Ricciardo	Red Bull Racing-TAG Heuer	70	+46.419	12	12
5	77	(Finland) Valtteri Bottas	Mercedes	70	+1:00.000^{1}	2	10
6	10	(France) Pierre Gasly	Scuderia Toro Rosso-Honda	70	+1:13.273	6	8
7	20	(Denmark) Kevin Magnussen	Haas-Ferrari	69	+1 lap	9	6
8	14	(Spain) Fernando Alonso	McLaren-Renault	69	+1 lap	11	4
9	55	(Spain) Carlos Sainz Jr.	Renault	69	+1 lap	5	2
10	8	(France) Romain Grosjean	Haas-Ferrari	69	+1 lap	10	1
11	28	(New Zealand) Brendon Hartley	Scuderia Toro Rosso-Honda	69	+1 lap	8	
12	27	(Germany) Nico Hülkenberg	Renault	69	+1 lap	13	
13	31	(France) Esteban Ocon	Force India-Mercedes	69	+1 lap	17	
14	11	(Mexico) Sergio Pérez	Force India-Mercedes	69	+1 lap	18	
15	9	(Sweden) Marcus Ericsson	Sauber-Ferrari	68	+2 laps	14	
16	35	(Russia) Sergey Sirotkin	Williams-Mercedes	68	+2 laps	19	
17	18	(Canada) Lance Stroll	Williams-Mercedes	68	+2 laps	PL	
Ret	2	(Belgium) Stoffel Vandoorne	McLaren-Renault	49	Gearbox	15	
Ret	33	(Netherlands) Max Verstappen	Red Bull Racing-TAG Heuer	5	Power loss	7	
Ret	16	(Monaco) Charles Leclerc	Sauber-Ferrari	0	Suspension	16	

Notes

- ^1 – Valtteri Bottas received a 10-second time penalty for causing a collision with Daniel Ricciardo.

== Championship standings after the race ==
Drivers' Championship standings

Pos.	Driver	Points
1	(United Kingdom) Lewis Hamilton	213
2	(Germany) Sebastian Vettel	189
3	(Finland) Kimi Räikkönen	146
4	(Finland) Valtteri Bottas	132
5	(Australia) Daniel Ricciardo	118

Constructors' Championship standings

	Pos.	Constructor	Points
	1	(Germany) Mercedes	345
	2	(Italy) Ferrari	335
	3	(Austria) Red Bull Racing-TAG Heuer	223
	4	(France) Renault	82
1	5	(United States) Haas-Ferrari	66

- Note: Only the top five positions are included for both sets of standings.

== See also ==
- 2018 Budapest Formula 2 round
- 2018 Budapest GP3 Series round

Previous race: 2018 German Grand Prix	FIA Formula One World Championship; 2018 season	Next race: 2018 Belgian Grand Prix
Previous race: 2017 Hungarian Grand Prix	Hungarian Grand Prix	Next race: 2019 Hungarian Grand Prix
