= 2018 Bahrain Grand Prix =

2018 Formula 1 race

Race 2 of 21 in the 2018 Formula One World Championship
← Previous race	Next race →

Race details
- Date: 8 April 2018
- Official name: Formula 1 2018 Gulf Air Bahrain Grand Prix
- Location: Bahrain International Circuit; Sakhir, Bahrain
- Course: Permanent racing facility
- Course length: 5.412 km (3.362 miles)
- Distance: 57 laps, 308.238 km (191.530 miles)
- Weather: Clear
- Attendance: 95,000

Pole position
Driver	(Germany) Sebastian Vettel	Ferrari
- Time: 1:27.958

Fastest lap
Driver	(Finland) Valtteri Bottas	Mercedes
- Time: 1:33.740 on lap 22

Podium
First	(Germany) Sebastian Vettel	Ferrari
Second	(Finland) Valtteri Bottas	Mercedes
Third	(United Kingdom) Lewis Hamilton	Mercedes

The 2018 Bahrain Grand Prix (formally known as the Formula 1 2018 Gulf Air Bahrain Grand Prix) was a Formula One motor race that took place on 8 April 2018 at the Bahrain International Circuit in Sakhir, Bahrain. The race was the second round of the 2018 Formula One World Championship and marked the 14th time that the Bahrain Grand Prix had been run as a round of the Formula One World Championship.

Sebastian Vettel was the defending race winner. He entered the round with a seven-point lead over Lewis Hamilton in the World Drivers' Championship. In the World Constructors' Championship standings, Ferrari hold a ten-point lead over Mercedes.

== Report ==
=== Practice ===
Daniel Ricciardo was fastest in first practice with Kimi Räikkönen fastest in second and third practice.

=== Qualifying ===
Sebastian Vettel qualified on pole position with a time of 1:27.958, a new outright track record, with teammate Kimi Räikkönen second. Mercedes locked out the second row, although Lewis Hamilton subsequently took a five place grid penalty for an unscheduled gearbox change and started from ninth on the grid. Pierre Gasly made Q3 for the first time in his career, eventually qualifying in sixth. Max Verstappen started the race in fifteenth position, having been prevented from taking part in Q2 following a crash in Q1 after he lost control of his throttle as his car rode over a kerb.

=== Race ===
At the start, Vettel got away well, leading into turn 1. Bottas overtook Raikkonen to claim 2nd, and Gasly also overtook Ricciardo to claim 4th. However, Ricciardo got 4th place back at turn 4, on the first lap. Max Verstappen made up ground on the first lap so he was behind Lewis Hamilton, who'd fallen to 10th place. The pair fought at turn 1 on lap 2, with Verstappen puncturing his left rear tyre. His teammate, Daniel Ricciardo, experienced an electrical shutdown at the same time, forcing him to retire. Brendon Hartley received a 10-second time penalty for causing a collision with Sergio Pérez. Verstappen then lost drive, also forcing him to retire from the Grand Prix. This was the first time in 8 years that both Red Bull Racing drivers retired from a Grand Prix, and the first time since the 2016 Russian Grand Prix that Red Bull did not score a point. It was also the first time since the 2010 Korean Grand Prix that neither Red Bull was classified. Hamilton overtook Fernando Alonso, Esteban Ocon and Nico Hülkenberg into one corner to move up into 6th place. He then passed Kevin Magnussen and Pierre Gasly in the next few laps to move up into 4th place.

During his second pit stop on lap 35, Kimi Räikkönen struck Ferrari tyre changer Francesco Cigarini with his left rear tyre as his car left the pit box, breaking Cigarini's tibia and fibula. The incident was caused by the Ferrari pit box's light incorrectly switching to green despite the fact that the left rear tyre had never actually been changed. After analysis, the faulty green was determined to have been caused by the pit system checking (only) if the wheel was securely fitted, and if the wheel gun had been "sufficiently active" beforehand. Räikkönen immediately stopped in the pit lane on advice over team radio and retired the car. Räikkönen's retirement promoted Lewis Hamilton to the podium, and Ferrari was subsequently fined €50,000 for an unsafe pit release.

Räikkönen's pit lane incident meant that teammate Sebastian Vettel could not carry out his second pit stop on schedule, and had to extend the stint on his soft tyres for 30% longer than the expected lifespan of the tyres, as stated by Pirelli. Towards the end of the race, with Vettel struggling with his tyres, Bottas got within DRS range of Vettel, but could not pass for the lead of the race. Pierre Gasly finished the race in P4, equalling Toro Rosso's best result in 2017, scoring Honda's best result since returning to F1 and earning him his first points in F1.

After the race, Brendon Hartley and Sergio Pérez both received 30 second time penalties for failing to maintain position on the formation lap.

== Classification ==
=== Qualifying ===
Pos.	Car no.	Driver	Constructor	Qualifying times			Final grid
Pos.	Car no.	Driver	Constructor	Q1	Q2	Q3	Final grid
1	5	(Germany) Sebastian Vettel	Ferrari	1:29.060	1:28.341	1:27.958	1
2	7	(Finland) Kimi Räikkönen	Ferrari	1:28.951	1:28.515	1:28.101	2
3	77	(Finland) Valtteri Bottas	Mercedes	1:29.275	1:28.794	1:28.124	3
4	44	(United Kingdom) Lewis Hamilton	Mercedes	1:29.396	1:28.458	1:28.220	9^{1}
5	3	(Australia) Daniel Ricciardo	Red Bull Racing-TAG Heuer	1:29.552	1:28.962	1:28.398	4
6	10	(France) Pierre Gasly	Scuderia Toro Rosso-Honda	1:30.121	1:29.836	1:29.329	5
7	20	(Denmark) Kevin Magnussen	Haas-Ferrari	1:29.594	1:29.623	1:29.358	6
8	27	(Germany) Nico Hülkenberg	Renault	1:30.260	1:29.187	1:29.570	7
9	31	(France) Esteban Ocon	Force India-Mercedes	1:30.338	1:30.009	1:29.874	8
10	55	(Spain) Carlos Sainz Jr.	Renault	1:29.893	1:29.802	1:29.986	10
11	28	(New Zealand) Brendon Hartley	Scuderia Toro Rosso-Honda	1:30.412	1:30.105		11
12	11	(Mexico) Sergio Pérez	Force India-Mercedes	1:30.218	1:30.156		12
13	14	(Spain) Fernando Alonso	McLaren-Renault	1:30.530^{2}	1:30.212		13
14	2	(Belgium) Stoffel Vandoorne	McLaren-Renault	1:30.479	1:30.525		14
15	33	(Netherlands) Max Verstappen	Red Bull Racing-TAG Heuer	1:29.374	No time		15
16	8	(France) Romain Grosjean	Haas-Ferrari	1:30.530^{2}			16
17	9	(Sweden) Marcus Ericsson	Sauber-Ferrari	1:31.063			17
18	35	(Russia) Sergey Sirotkin	Williams-Mercedes	1:31.414			18
19	16	(Monaco) Charles Leclerc	Sauber-Ferrari	1:31.420			19
20	18	(Canada) Lance Stroll	Williams-Mercedes	1:31.503			20
107% time: 1:35.177

Notes

- ^1 – Lewis Hamilton received a five-place grid penalty for an unscheduled gearbox change.
- ^2 – Fernando Alonso and Romain Grosjean set identical lap times in Q1. As Alonso was the first to set his time, he was considered to have qualified ahead of Grosjean and advanced to Q2.

=== Race ===
Pos.	No.	Driver	Constructor	Laps	Time/Retired	Grid	Points
1	5	(Germany) Sebastian Vettel	Ferrari	57	1:32:01.940	1	25
2	77	(Finland) Valtteri Bottas	Mercedes	57	+0.699	3	18
3	44	(United Kingdom) Lewis Hamilton	Mercedes	57	+6.512	9	15
4	10	(France) Pierre Gasly	Scuderia Toro Rosso-Honda	57	+1:02.234	5	12
5	20	(Denmark) Kevin Magnussen	Haas-Ferrari	57	+1:15.046	6	10
6	27	(Germany) Nico Hülkenberg	Renault	57	+1:39.024	7	8
7	14	(Spain) Fernando Alonso	McLaren-Renault	56	+1 lap	13	6
8	2	(Belgium) Stoffel Vandoorne	McLaren-Renault	56	+1 lap	14	4
9	9	(Sweden) Marcus Ericsson	Sauber-Ferrari	56	+1 lap	17	2
10	31	(France) Esteban Ocon	Force India-Mercedes	56	+1 lap	8	1
11	55	(Spain) Carlos Sainz Jr.	Renault	56	+1 lap	10	
12	16	(Monaco) Charles Leclerc	Sauber-Ferrari	56	+1 lap	19	
13	8	(France) Romain Grosjean	Haas-Ferrari	56	+1 lap	16	
14	18	(Canada) Lance Stroll	Williams-Mercedes	56	+1 lap	20	
15	35	(Russia) Sergey Sirotkin	Williams-Mercedes	56	+1 lap	18	
16^{1}	11	(Mexico) Sergio Pérez	Force India-Mercedes	56	+1 lap	12	
17^{2}	28	(New Zealand) Brendon Hartley	Scuderia Toro Rosso-Honda	56	+1 lap	11	
Ret	7	(Finland) Kimi Räikkönen	Ferrari	35	Wheel	2	
Ret	33	(Netherlands) Max Verstappen	Red Bull Racing-TAG Heuer	3	Transmission	15	
Ret	3	(Australia) Daniel Ricciardo	Red Bull Racing-TAG Heuer	1	Electrics	4	

Notes

- ^1 – Sergio Pérez originally finished in twelfth place but had thirty seconds added to race time for overtaking on the formation lap.
- ^2 – Brendon Hartley originally finished in thirteenth place but had thirty seconds added to race time for failing to retake his original starting position before reaching the safety-car line on the formation lap.

== Championship standings after the race ==
Drivers' Championship standings

	Pos.	Driver	Points
	1	(Germany) Sebastian Vettel	50
	2	(United Kingdom) Lewis Hamilton	33
5	3	(Finland) Valtteri Bottas	22
1	4	(Spain) Fernando Alonso	16
2	5	(Finland) Kimi Räikkönen	15

Constructors' Championship standings

	Pos.	Constructor	Points
	1	(Italy) Ferrari	65
	2	(Germany) Mercedes	55
1	3	(United Kingdom) McLaren-Renault	22
1	4	(Austria) Red Bull Racing-TAG Heuer	20
	5	(France) Renault	15

- Note: Only the top five positions are included for both sets of standings.

== See also ==
- 2018 Bahrain FIA Formula 2 round

Previous race: 2018 Australian Grand Prix	FIA Formula One World Championship; 2018 season	Next race: 2018 Chinese Grand Prix
Previous race: 2017 Bahrain Grand Prix	Bahrain Grand Prix	Next race: 2019 Bahrain Grand Prix
