= Mercedes AMG F1 W08 EQ Power+ =

2017 Formula One racing car

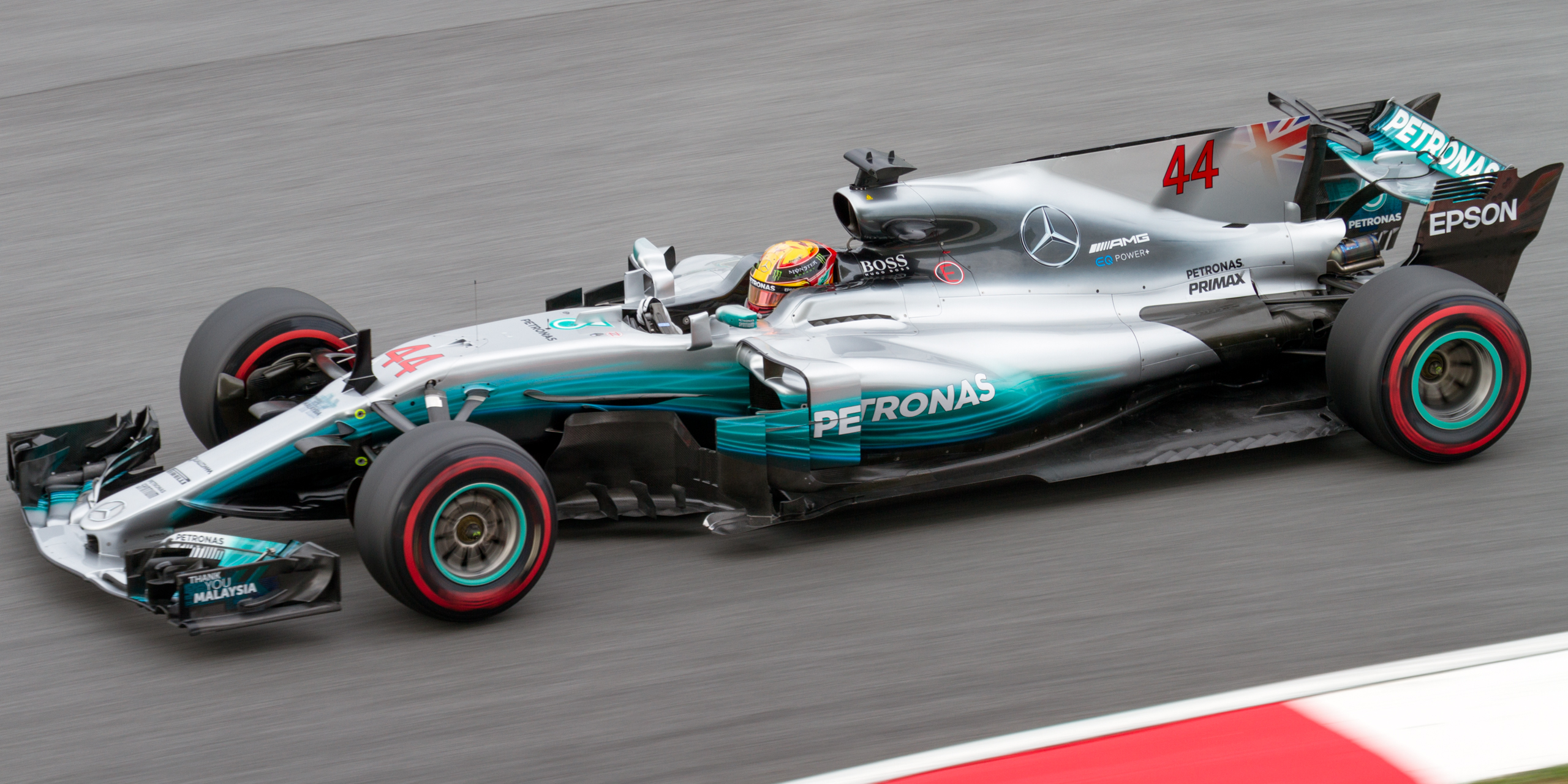
- The F1 W08 EQ Power+, driven by Lewis Hamilton, during the Malaysian Grand Prix
- Category: Formula One
- Constructor: Mercedes
- Designers: Paddy Lowe (Technical Director); Aldo Costa (Engineering Director); Geoff Willis (Technology Director); Mark Ellis (Performance Director); John Owen (Chief Designer); Loïc Serra (Chief Vehicle Dynamicist); Russell Cooley (Chief Engineer); Mike Elliott (Head of Aerodynamics); Jarrod Murphy (Chief Aerodynamicist); Andy Cowell (Managing Director - Power Unit); Hywel Thomas (Engineering Director - Power Unit)
- Predecessor: Mercedes F1 W07 Hybrid
- Successor: Mercedes AMG F1 W09 EQ Power+

Technical specifications
- Chassis: Moulded carbon fibre and Honeycomb composite structure
- Suspension (front): Carbon fibre wishbone and pushrod activated torsion springs and rockers
- Suspension (rear): Carbon fibre wishbone and pullrod activated torsion springs and rockers
- Width: 2,000 mm (79 in)
- Height: 950 mm (37 in)
- Wheelbase: 3,726 mm (146.7 in)
- Engine: Mercedes-AMG F1 M08 EQ Power+, 1.6 L (98 cu in), 90° - V6 turbocharged engine, limited to 15,000 RPM, in a mid-mounted, rear-wheel drive layout
- Electric motor: Motor Generator Unit–Kinetic (MGU-K), Motor Generator Unit–Heat (MGU-H)
- Transmission: Mercedes co-developed with Xtrac semi-automatic seamless shift sequential gearbox with 8 forward and 1 reverse gear
- Battery: Mercedes lithium-ion battery solution
- Power: 949 horsepower (708 kW)
- Weight: 728 kg (1,605.0 lb)
- Fuel: Petronas Primax
- Lubricants: Petronas Syntium & Tutela
- Brakes: Carbone Industrie carbon brake discs, pads and Brembo brake calipers with rear brake-by-wire
- Tyres: Pirelli P Zero (Dry/Slick); Pirelli Cinturato (Wet/Treaded); OZ forged magnesium wheels: 13"
- Clutch: Carbon fibre reinforced carbon plate

Competition history
- Notable entrants: Mercedes AMG Petronas Motorsport
- Notable drivers: 44. (United Kingdom) Lewis Hamilton; 77. (Finland) Valtteri Bottas
- Debut: 2017 Australian Grand Prix
- First win: 2017 Chinese Grand Prix
- Last win: 2017 Abu Dhabi Grand Prix
- Last event: 2017 Abu Dhabi Grand Prix
Races	Wins	Podiums	Poles	F/Laps
20	12	26	15	9
- Constructors' Championships: 1 (2017)
- Drivers' Championships: 1 (Lewis Hamilton, 2017)

The Mercedes AMG F1 W08 EQ Power+ (commonly abbreviated as the Mercedes W08) is a highly successful Mercedes-Benz Formula One racing car designed and developed under the direction of Paddy Lowe, Aldo Costa, Geoff Willis, Loïc Serra, Russell Cooley, John Owen, Mike Elliott and Jarrod Murphy to compete during the 2017 Formula One World Championship. The car was driven by three-time World Drivers' Champion Lewis Hamilton, who remained with the team for a fifth season, and Valtteri Bottas, who joined the team after 2016 World Champion Nico Rosberg's retirement from the sport.

The chassis was originally named the "Mercedes F1 W08" to represent the eighth Formula One car that Mercedes had constructed since 2010. The "EQ Power+" was added to increase exposure of Mercedes' electric road car models, whilst AMG was included to reflect the relationship between Mercedes-AMG and Mercedes-Benz. The car made its competitive début at the 2017 Australian Grand Prix, the opening round of the 2017 season. After participating in 19 rounds of Grand Prix racing, the car made its final competition appearance at the season finale race – the 2017 Abu Dhabi Grand Prix, before retirement.

The F1 W08 EQ Power+ took twelve wins (nine for Hamilton and three for Bottas), fifteen pole positions (eleven for Hamilton and four for Bottas), nine fastest laps (seven for Hamilton and two for Bottas) and four 1–2 finishes. The team clinched their fourth consecutive Constructors' Championship at the United States Grand Prix, the 17th race of the season with three races to spare. Hamilton clinched his fourth World Drivers' Championship at the season's next round, the Mexican Grand Prix.

== Design and development ==
=== Initial design ===
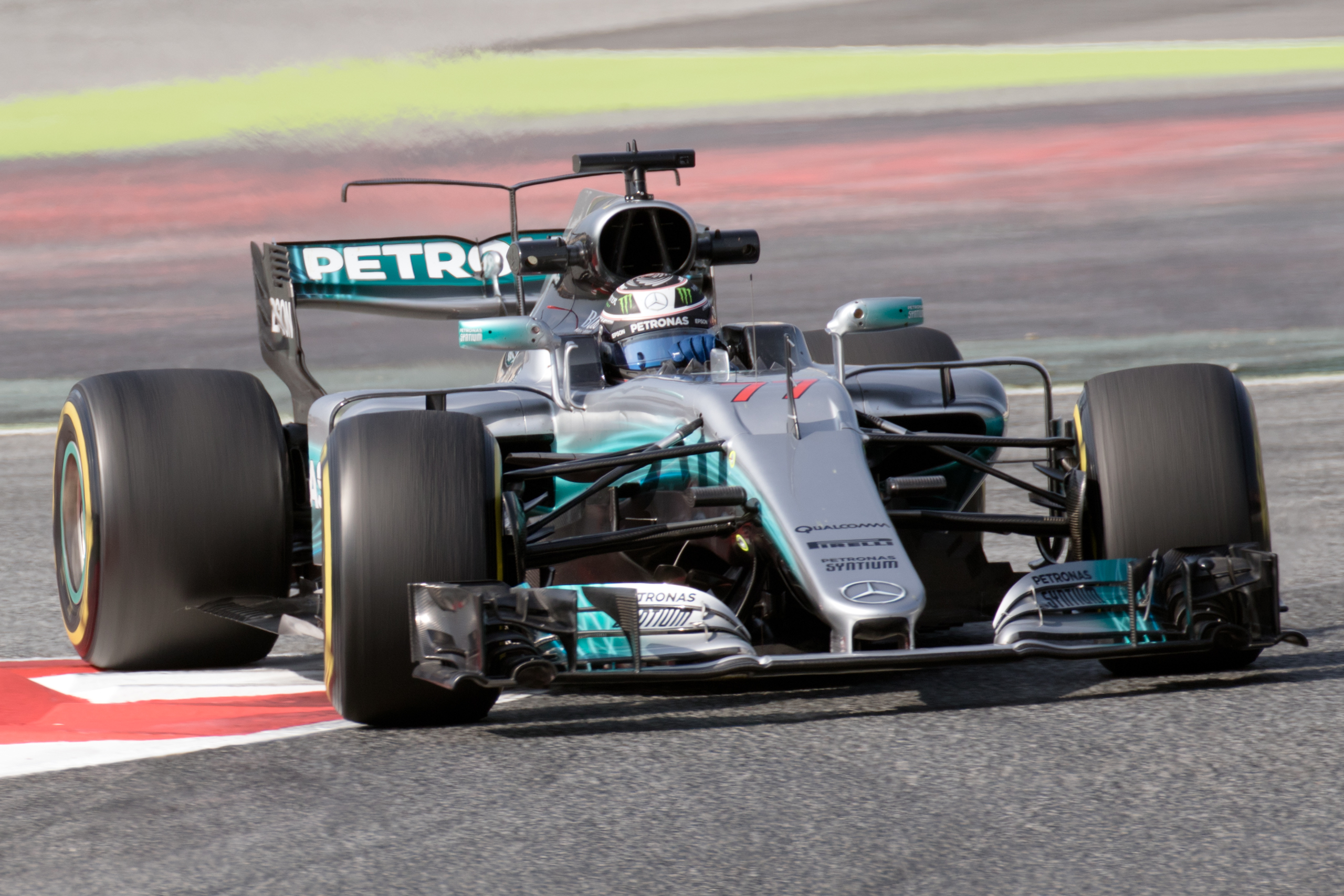
Novel front suspension and T-wing designs with bowl-shaped rear wing on F1 W08 EQ Power+

In order to improve airflow for better aerodynamics purposes, Mercedes changed the front suspension by having the top wishbone attach directly to an extension before connecting to an upright. The increment in height of the top wishbone is to prevent the disturbance of airflow travelling from the front of the car, to the side-pods and towards the rear suspension, which may affect the stability of the entire car. Coincidentally, Scuderia Toro Rosso also has this aerodynamic design on its 2017 car, the Toro Rosso STR12. Mercedes adopted a "T-wing" device on the rear of the car to generate better rear down-force. The "T-wing" device was seen as an external design mounted on the engine cover rather than shark fin like other 2017 cars. Bowl-shaped rear wing design brought from its predecessors remains on F1 W08 EQ Power+ to create higher down-force and reducing drag.

=== Barcelona upgrade ===
Mercedes brought its first major aerodynamic upgrade at the Spanish Grand Prix, changing the car from the front to the rear. The most obvious change was the introduction of a new, narrower nose which included a never seen before under-nose turning vane to help create a type of skirt underneath the car. Furthermore, Mercedes redesigned the area of the bargeboards which subsequently sported three R-shaped upstands. They also revised the winglet on the wishbone extension and introduced new camera mounts, a revised floor ahead of the rear tyre, a revised rear wing, and a new two-tier monkey seat. According to Michael Schmidt from German magazine auto motor und sport, the upgrade wasn't supposed to have major time gains (apparently only 0.1 s). Mercedes' main targets were to make the car more consistent and to bring its tyres more easily into the operating window, as previously these had been their main deficits in comparison to Ferrari.

=== Development testing ===
During the Azerbaijan Grand Prix, Mercedes experimented asymmetric brake set-up during both practice session on Friday for running greater cooling capacity on one side of the car. However, to speed up getting heat into the front tyres, the team decided to revert to symmetric layout during Saturday final practice, qualifying and Sunday race.

=== Sepang upgrade ===
Mercedes brought a package of upgrades to the Malaysian Grand Prix. They made a change to the front wing design, with the leading edge of the mainplane swept upward to encourage airflow under the wing, guided by the now-pronounced strakes that reside beneath. The under-nose ‘cape’ which Mercedes introduced in Spain and revised in Austria got altered again, with the leading edge of the device widened. The highly complex area of the bargeboards - which includes 20 different surfaces working together - was also changed. The vertical cascades mounted on the edge of the serrated floor strakes got modified, reducing their height while also being angled more aggressively. The axehead, which was normally split into four serrated surfaces, got reduced to three, with outermost two surfaces combined. They also modified the diffusor by including innermost strakes.

== Launch, pre-season and in-season testing ==
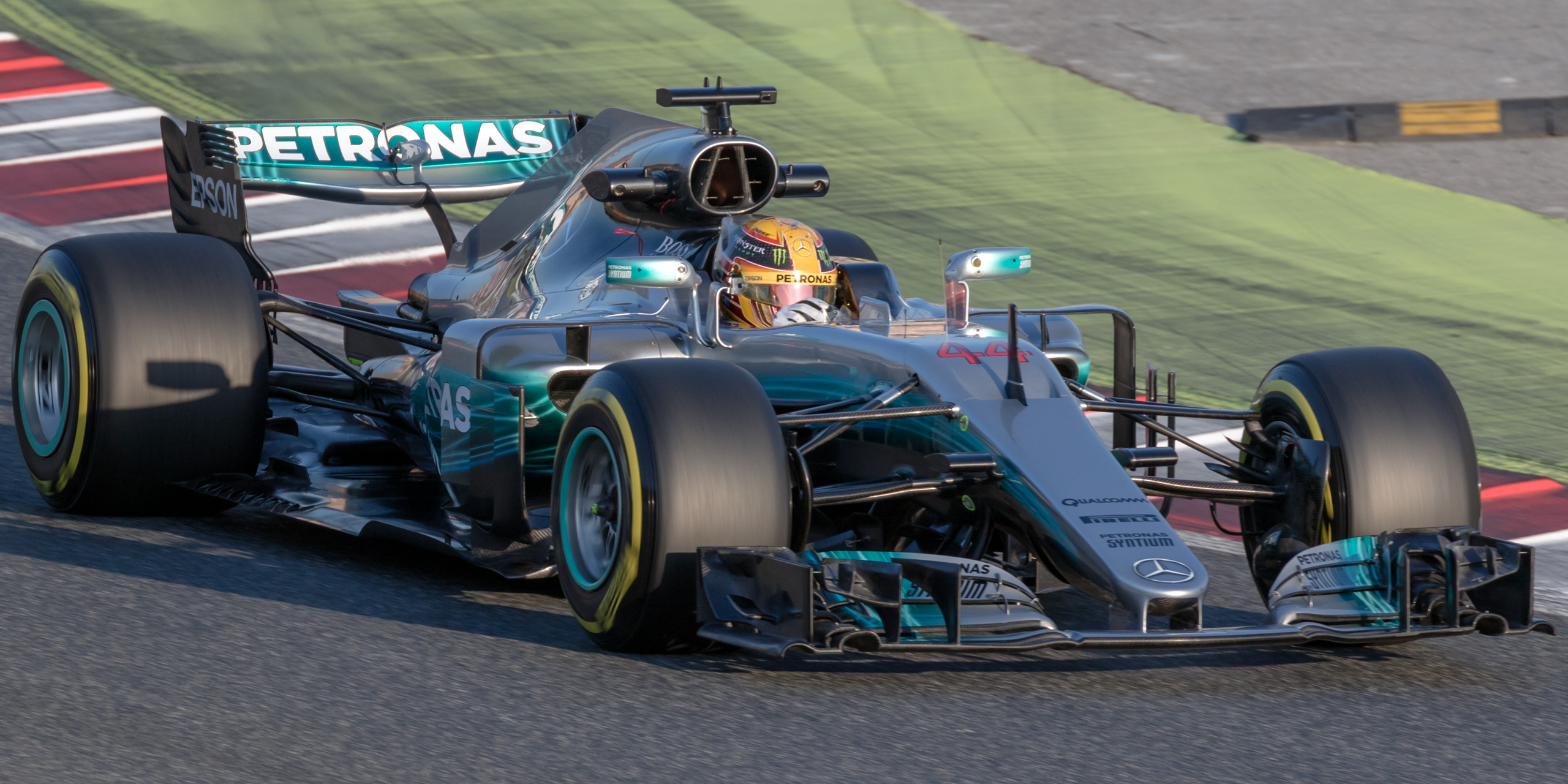
Hamilton drove the F1 W08 EQ Power+ without the "T-wing" device during pre-season testing.

The Mercedes AMG F1 W08 EQ Power+ was unofficially launched at the Silverstone Circuit with Hamilton and Bottas completing an inaugural shakedown on 23 February 2017. The car took part the pre-season testing at Circuit de Barcelona-Catalunya on February 27–March 2 and March 7–10. During the eight testing days, the car completed 1096 laps; a total of 5,102 km (3,170.2 mi), equivalent to over 16 race distances. The car was also driven by 2017 GP3 Series champion George Russell during in-season testing.

== Season summary ==
=== Opening rounds ===
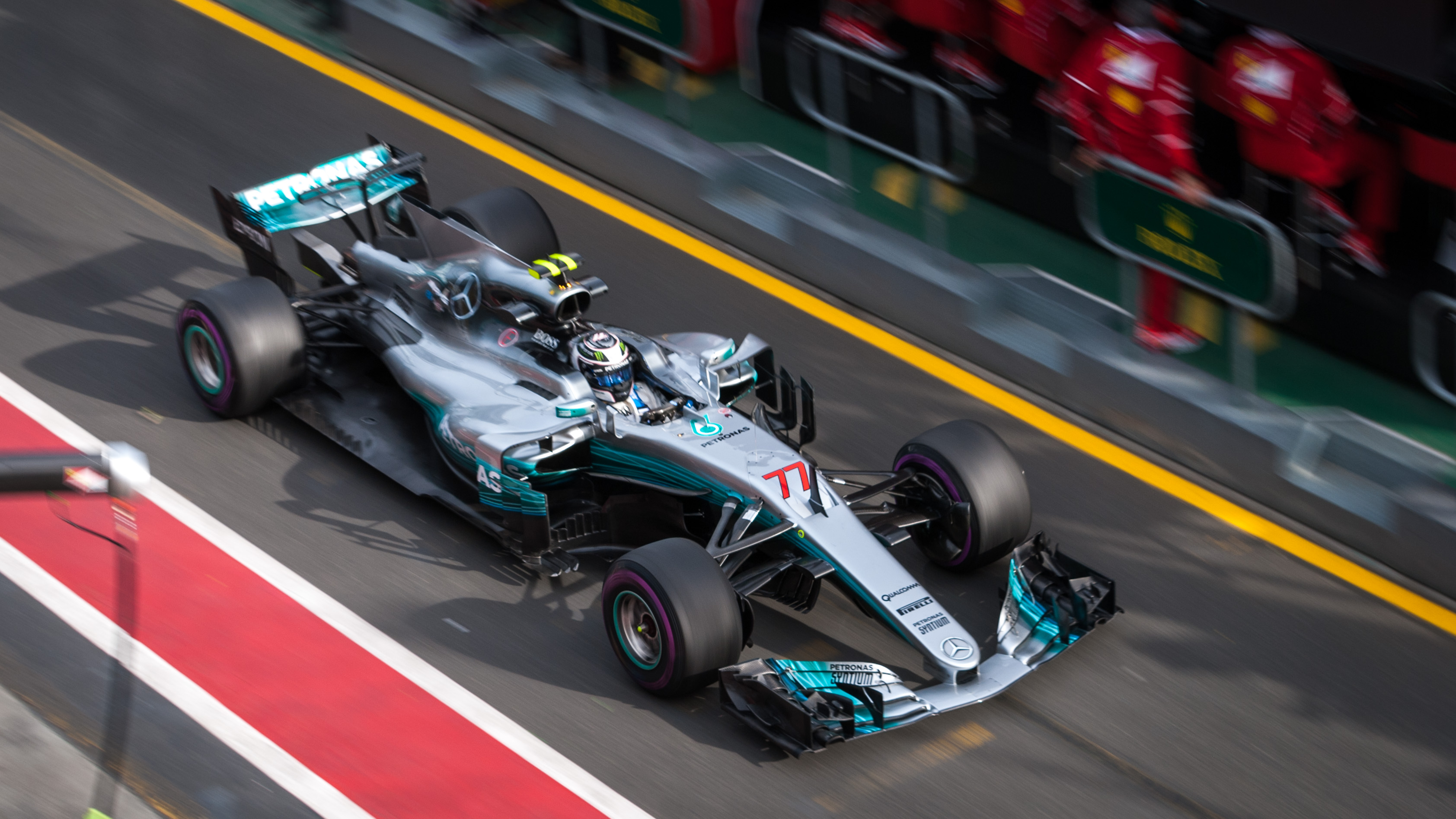
Bottas secured his first podium for Mercedes at the season-opening Australian Grand Prix

Hamilton took pole position for the season-opening Australian Grand Prix, and held the early lead until the sole round of pit stops. He came out behind Red Bull's Max Verstappen and was unable to overtake him, giving Vettel the opportunity to build a lead which was big enough to emerge ahead of Hamilton after making his only pit stop. Hamilton was unable to catch Vettel and finished in second place. Bottas started third and held his position, securing a podium of his own.

Hamilton qualified on pole position again for the Chinese Grand Prix, and in a race that saw variable conditions, Hamilton claimed his third career grand slam, while Bottas recovered to sixth after an early spin. After the race, Mercedes took the lead in the Constructors' Championship by a solitary point from Ferrari.

At the Bahrain Grand Prix, Bottas took his maiden Formula One pole position after beating his teammate Hamilton by a quarter of a second, locking out the front row of the grid. During the race, Hamilton was passed by Sebastian Vettel during the start while Bottas stayed in the lead, and they held their positions until the first round of pit stops. Vettel was the first to make a stop and managed to take the lead from Bottas when the latter changed tyres. Hamilton lost a place to Red Bull Racing's Daniel Ricciardo himself and also incurred a time penalty for deliberately blocking Ricciardo in the pit entry. Hamilton rebounded to finish second ahead of Bottas, thus as a result, Mercedes relinquished the championship lead again to Ferrari.

=== European and Canadian rounds ===
At the fourth round of the season – the Russian Grand Prix, Mercedes struggled to be at the forefront, with Bottas and Hamilton qualifying only 3rd and 4th respectively as Ferrari locked out the front-row of the grid, the worst qualifying result since the 2015 Singapore Grand Prix. In the race, Bottas grabbed the lead at the start in Sochi and pulled away through a mighty first stint, but then came under increasing pressure as Ferrari's Sebastian Vettel closed rapidly in the closing stages. Bottas held off Ferrari's Sebastian Vettel by six tenths of a second, to secure his maiden victory in his Formula 1 career. On the other hand, Hamilton continued to struggle on pace, hampered by overheating issues, during the whole course of the race, finishing fourth. Having completed one-fifth of the season, Mercedes took back the lead in the Constructors' Championship by just a solitary point over their closest rivals, Ferrari.

Although Ferrari had shown a dominating performance during winter testing and had achieved a front-row lockout in Sochi, Hamilton managed to defeat Vettel for pole in the qualifying of the Spanish Grand Prix by the tiny margin of 0.051 s. After having to deal with technical issues on his car before and during FP3, Bottas managed to take P3, 2 tenths behind his teammate. Vettel managed to overtake Hamilton at the start of the race and led the early stages but Hamilton was later able to take advantage of a virtual safety car period to pit for new soft tyres which helped him overtake Vettel soon after. Hamilton, despite being on a lengthy stint on those same tyres, was able to keep Vettel (who was on medium tyres) at bay to win his second race of the season and took his 12th career hat-trick. Bottas escaped a collision with Räikkönen at the start without damage but later retired due to an engine failure while running third which cost Mercedes a double podium finish.

The Monaco Grand Prix saw both Mercedes struggle for traction and pace which resulted in Bottas and Hamilton qualifying 3rd and 14th respectively. At the race, Red Bull's Daniel Ricciardo managed to overcut Bottas by taking the last podium position. Meanwhile, Hamilton stayed out until lap 46 to make his sole pit-stop and managed to grab 7th place after starting from 13th on the grid. Mercedes subsequently lost the lead in the Constructors' Championship by 17 points, as neither of the two drivers finished on the podium for the first time since the 2016 Spanish Grand Prix.

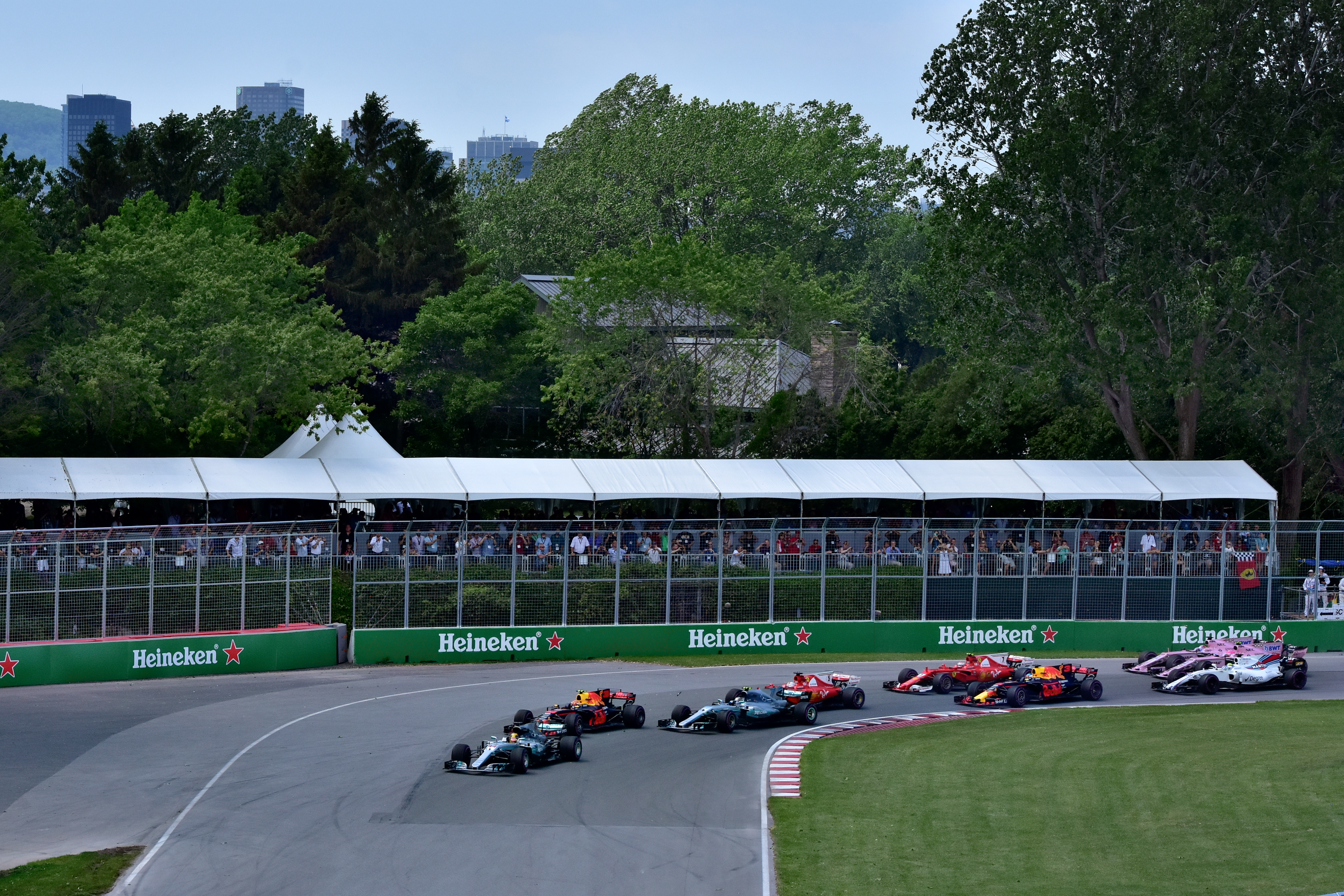
At the Canadian Grand Prix, Hamilton led the race from pole position and recorded the first 1-2 finish for Mercedes in 2017

At the Canadian Grand Prix, Hamilton matched Ayrton Senna's second-place record of 65 pole positions. In the process, he set the fastest lap ever at the Circuit Gilles Villeneuve (1m 11.459s), smashing Ralf Schumacher’s qualifying lap record of 1m 12.275s from 2004 by 0.816 s. Bottas took P3, behind Vettel but ahead of Räikkönen. Mercedes earned their first 1-2 finish of the season with an easy win from Hamilton, his third of the season and sixth overall in Canada. Hamilton also recorded his fourth career grand slam – equaling his idol Senna again – and his second in 2017 after the Chinese Grand Prix. Bottas completed the 1–2 with a controlled second-place finish but had some luck when Verstappen retired while running second in the early laps. Mercedes also took back the lead in the Constructors' Championship over Ferrari.

Mercedes achieved their second front row lockout of the season during qualifying for the Azerbaijan Grand Prix in a dominating performance. With a phenomenal last lap Hamilton snatched pole position back from his teammate by over 4 tenths. Both Ferraris couldn't get within 1 second of the pole time. Hamilton's 66th career pole left him just two shy of matching Michael Schumacher's all-time record. Hamilton started well while Bottas collided with his rival countryman - Kimi Räikkönen, causing a puncture on his front right tyre. Bottas was forced to stop, falling one lap behind his teammate. The race continued with much drama, three safety cars and 1 red flag period due to clashes of other cars and debris on the track. After a 20-minute red flag period, the race was restarted behind the Safety Car. Hamilton led at the restart however he had a loose headrest issue causing him to pit for a new headrest, consequently losing the lead of the race. Bottas recovered and claimed second by slip-streaming Lance Stroll on the finishing line, while Hamilton took fifth behind rival Vettel.

Bottas set the fastest lap ever at the Red Bull Ring (1:04.251), smashing Hamilton's all time lap record of 1:06.228 from 2016 by 1.977 s, gaining him the 2nd pole position of his career. Hamilton qualified 3rd but started the Austrian Grand Prix from 8th after receiving a five-place grid penalty for an unscheduled gearbox change. On Sunday, Bottas took his second career victory. After a superb getaway which caused a jump start investigation, Bottas led easily from pole and dominated the first half of the race on ultrasoft tyres. However once the harder supersofts came on, Vettel managed to close the gap on the Mercedes whose tyres started to suffer. Like the Russian Grand Prix, the Finn managed to secure the win finishing just 0.6s ahead of Vettel. Meanwhile, Hamilton fought back from eighth position to fourth place, just 1.4 s shy of reaching a podium place. After the race, Bottas was cleared for his alleged jump start incident as the FIA investigated Bottas's start movement and it was deemed a perfectly accurate and fortuitous judgement call, anticipating the moment the five lights went out by just 0.201 s, which is within FIA allowed tolerances.

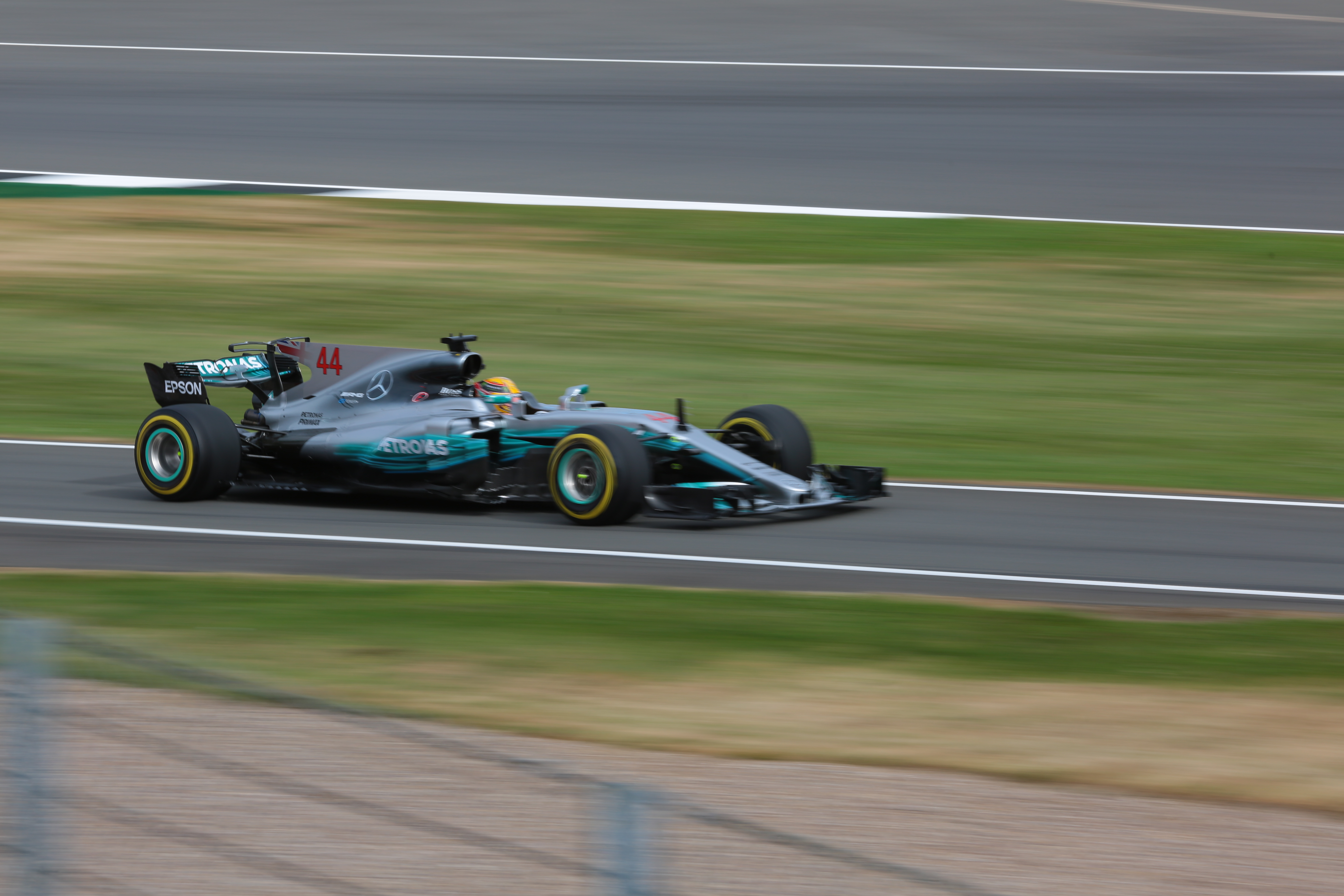
Hamilton achieved his fifth career grand slam and his third of the season during the British Grand Prix.

During qualifying for the British Grand Prix, Hamilton matched Jim Clark's record of five British Grand Prix pole positions. In a stunning performance, he set the outright lap record of 1:26.600 and out-qualified Räikkönen by over half a second, making it the biggest margin of the season until the wet qualifying at the Italian Grand Prix. Bottas only qualified fourth fastest after having a lock-up on his final run. Furthermore, the Finn received a five-place grid penalty for an unscheduled gearbox change which meant that he had to start the race from ninth position. Mercedes would go on to claim their second one-two finish of the season as Hamilton flawlessly converted his pole position into his fourth win of the season and fifth British GP win overall, equaling the record shared by Jim Clark and Alain Prost. It was his fifth career grand slam and his third of the season, tying Alberto Ascari (1952), Jim Clark (1963 and 1965) and Nigel Mansell (1992) for most grand chelems in a single season. Hamilton narrowed the gap in the Drivers' Championship to only 1 point behind Vettel after the latter finished seventh due to a tyre failure in the closing laps of the race. Bottas made up for his penalty by recovering to third but was also the beneficiary of more Ferrari bad luck when Räikkönen, who was running in second place had the same problem as Vettel which allowed Bottas to take the second step on the podium, dropping Räikkönen to third.

After a dominant weekend in Silverstone, Mercedes finished 3rd and 4th in Hungary with Bottas ahead of Hamilton. This attracted some controversy as Bottas was initially ahead of Hamilton however due to Vettel having steering damage in 1st place, combined with Räikkönen being unable to pass his teammate a queue of cars were forming behind the Ferraris. As Bottas was unable to overtake Räikkönen, Hamilton requested to swap places with Bottas to try to overtake both Ferraris. After being unable to do so, Hamilton relinquished the position back to Bottas on the final corner of the last lap. Despite scoring 27 points to Ferrari's 43 points, Mercedes still held a 39-point advantage over the Scuderia going into the summer break with Hamilton and Bottas 2nd and 3rd in the Drivers' Championship.

During the qualifying of the Belgian Grand Prix, Hamilton scored his 68th career pole position, setting the fastest lap ever at the Circuit de Spa-Francorchamps (1m 42.553s). Bottas qualified third, behind Vettel but ahead of Räikkönen. At his 200th Formula One race, Hamilton claimed his fifth win of the season in a close battle with Vettel who managed to keep in touch with Hamilton throughout the entire race, but could not find a way past. Bottas initially held third place but fell to his eventual finishing position of fifth place after being overtaken by both Ricciardo and Räikkönen after a safety car restart.

Formula One history was made one week later at the Italian Grand Prix when Hamilton won his 69th pole position, surpassing Michael Schumacher for most all-time. During the wet qualifying session, Hamilton took pole position by 1.148 s. over Verstappen in Q3, making it by far the biggest margin of the season. Bottas qualified sixth, but was promoted two places to fourth when both Red Bull drivers were given grid penalties for unscheduled changes to their cars. Hamilton easily converted his pole position into his sixth win which also meant he took the lead in the Drivers' Championship over Vettel by 3 points. Bottas lost a position to Räikkönen at the start but passed him back later in the opening lap and soon after would overtake Lance Stroll and Esteban Ocon to take second place in what was Mercedes' most dominating race so far as they took their third one-two finish of the season. With the European rounds of the season complete and seven rounds remaining, Mercedes held a 62-point lead in the Constructors' Championship over Ferrari.

=== Asian rounds ===
Mercedes struggled during the qualifying of the Singapore Grand Prix. In a worst-case scenario for the team, Vettel grabbed pole position while Hamilton and Bottas only qualified on the third row for P5 and P6, behind both Red Bulls and the second Ferrari of Räikkönen. During the first ever wet-dry night Grand Prix on Sunday, Hamilton benefited from a heavy start crash involving Räikkönen, Verstappen and Vettel which forced all three of them to retire their cars. He took the lead after a few corners and went on to win the race despite having to fight off Ricciardo during three safety car restarts. Bottas initially dropped down to sixth place but managed to regain third position during a phase of pit stops, allowing Mercedes an unlikely double-podium finish.

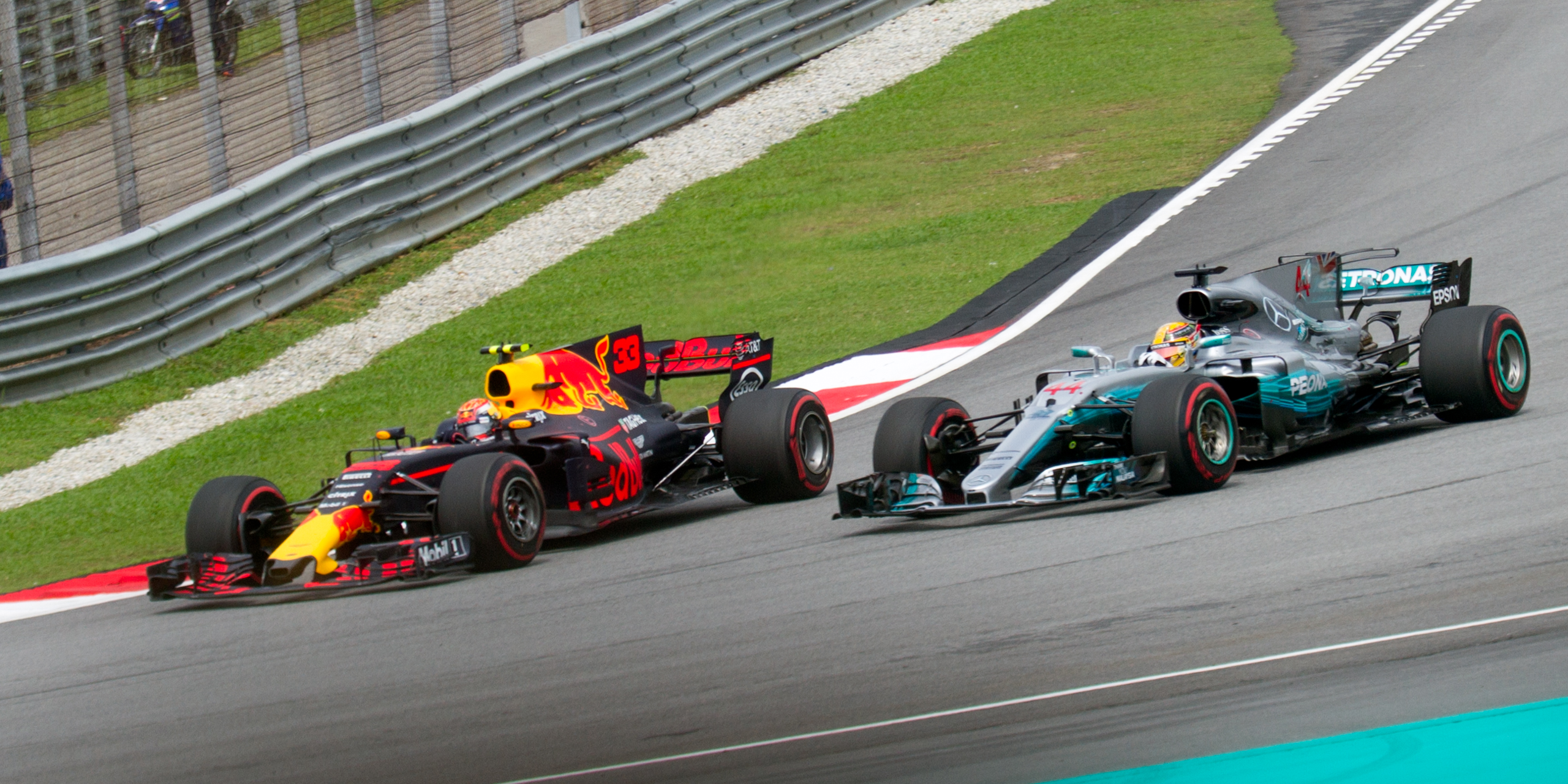
Max Verstappen took over the lead by overtaking Hamilton at Malaysian Grand Prix

Having major setup difficulties after introducing a new upgrade package at the Malaysian Grand Prix, Mercedes found themselves over 1.4 s. off pace to Ferrari on Friday. Mercedes boss Toto Wolff said that the car had a fundamental issue which needed to be found out. On Saturday the team decided to run split programmes, with Bottas running the new aero package and Hamilton reverting to the old one. During qualifying Mercedes benefited from unlucky power unit problems on Vettel's car which made him start last on the grid. Hamilton went on to secure his 70th career pole position, by slamming in a new track lap record of 1m 30.076s. He managed to fend off Räikkönen by less than half a tenth (0.045 s.). Bottas finished fifth fastest, behind both Red Bulls. Mercedes struggled again on Sunday. After staying ahead of the start, Hamilton ceded his lead to a charging Verstappen on lap 4 as he was suffering with a problem with his car's MGU-K system which saw him lose around 160 hp on the straights. He quietly settled for second place and focused on further extending his lead in the driver's championship. Bottas got a great start which moved him up to P3 but he dropped down to fifth position again after being overtaken by Ricciardo and a recovering Vettel who started from the back of the grid.

During qualifying of the Japanese Grand Prix Mercedes proved to be the dominant force in cool weather conditions. Hamilton flew to his first Suzuka pole and shattered the old circuit record by Michael Schumacher from 2006 by over 1.6 seconds. Bottas qualified second, 3 tenths behind his teammate. However, due to an unscheduled gearbox change he received a five-place grid penalty, thus promoting Vettel to a first row start. On Sunday Hamilton took advantage of another retirement from Vettel and controlled the pace for the majority of the race. During the final laps he came under increasing pressure from Verstappen after having lost heat in his tyres during a late virtual safety car but managed to beat the Red Bull by 1.2 seconds in a thrilling finish. Bottas attacked Ricciardo in the closing stages of the race after running the faster supersofts in his final stint but just missed out on the podium by nine-tenths of a second.

=== Final rounds ===
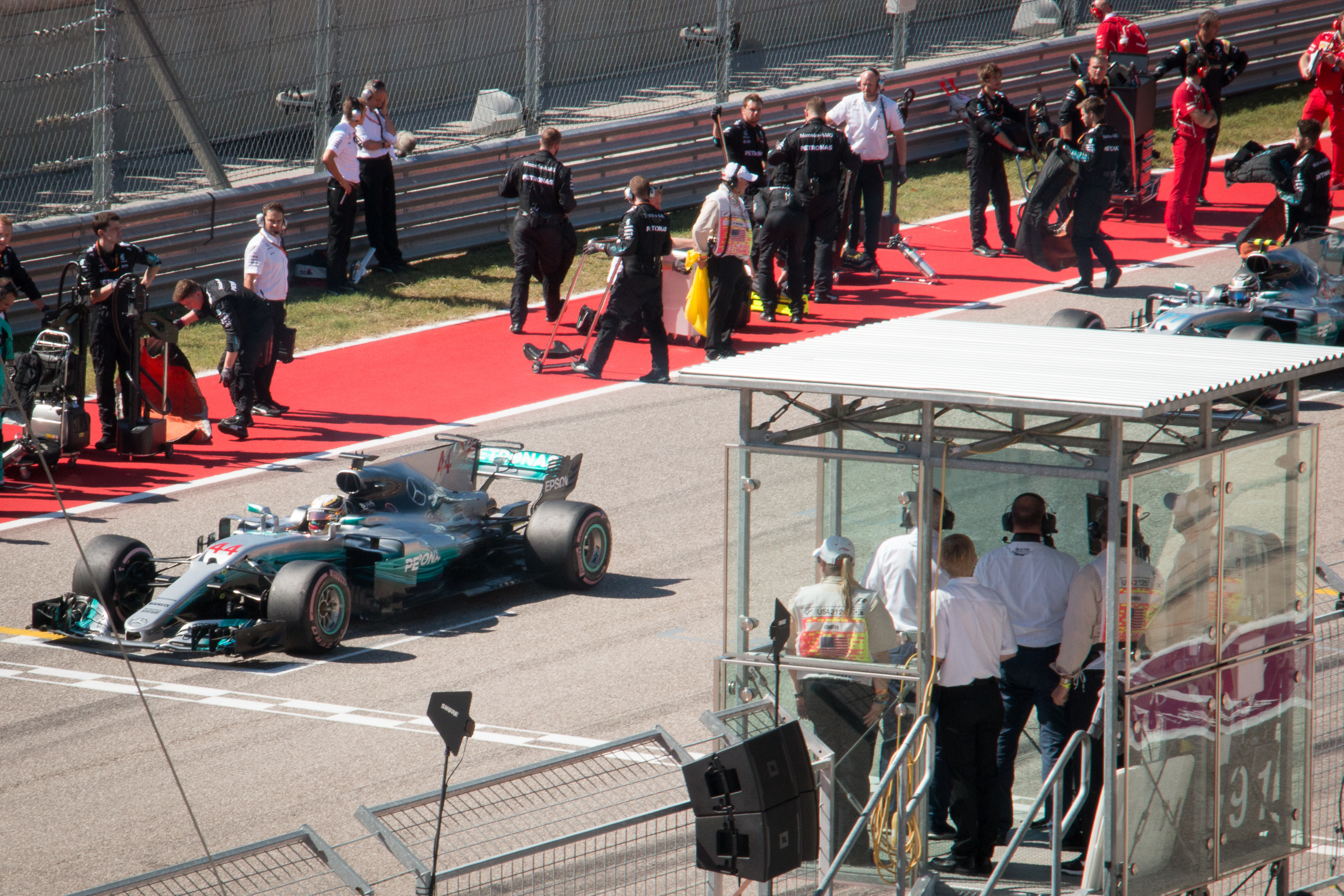
Hamilton took the pole position of the United States Grand Prix and leads the field just before the formation lap.

Hamilton broke another record during qualifying for the United States Grand Prix. In windy conditions, Hamilton claimed his 72nd pole position and his 117th front row start, setting a new record for all-time front row places and surpassing the old benchmark of Michael Schumacher (116 front row starts). Vettel split the Mercedes drivers with Bottas grabbing the third spot, around half a second behind his teammate. In a noteworthy finish, third to fifth places on the grid were separated by less than a hundredth of a second: Bottas managed to beat Ricciardo by merely 0.009 seconds while the latter recorded the same time (to the thousandth of a second) as Räikkönen. On Sunday Mercedes clinched their 4th consecutive World Constructors' Championship, having scored 575 points to 428 points from their closest competitor - Ferrari. Lewis Hamilton initially lost his lead to Vettel at the start but Vettel couldn't make it last. A charging Hamilton blew past Vettel on lap 6 to take the lead, before going on to cruise to victory in a dominant display and further extending his lead in the Drivers' Championship. Meanwhile, Bottas had a more troublesome race. At first, he closed down the gap on Vettel but in the latter stages of the Grand Prix his tyres gave up on him. He finished in fifth place after losing out to Räikkönen, Vettel - who passed him after making a second pit stop - and Verstappen.

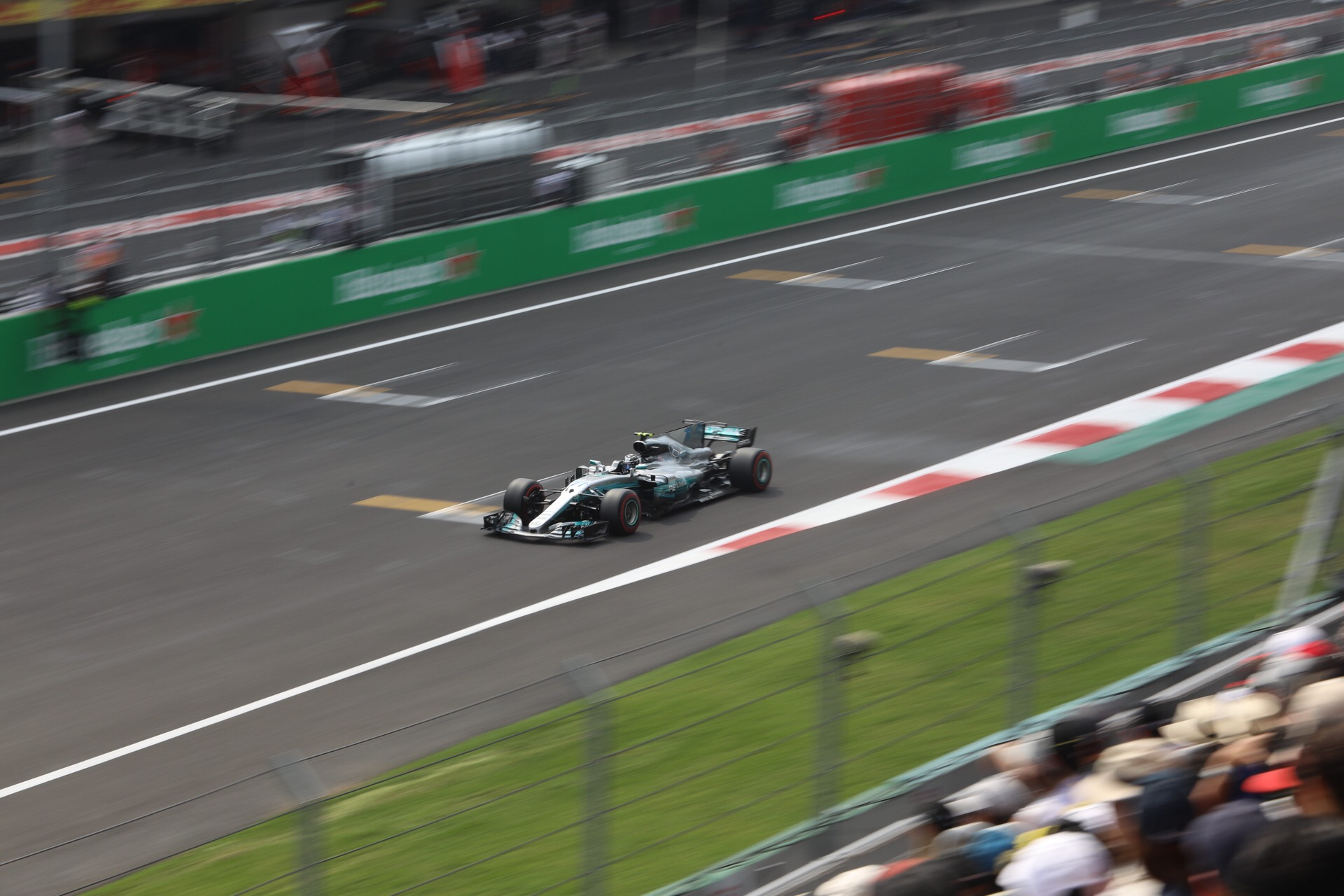
Bottas at the Mexican Grand Prix, where he finished second

After winning the World Constructors' Championship in Austin, Mercedes had the chance of securing the World Drivers' Championship at the Mexican Grand Prix. A fifth-place finish would suffice for Hamilton to become World Champion regardless of any other driver's result. Hamilton and Bottas qualified on the second row during qualifying, behind Vettel and Verstappen. Both drivers only had one clean lap in Q3 with Bottas being impeded by Verstappen and Hamilton making a rare mistake on his final run. In the race, Hamilton and Vettel made contact in Turn 3 of the opening lap while battling for position with Verstappen, forcing Hamilton and Vettel into the pits for repairs. Hamilton ultimately finished ninth after a spectacular fight with Alonso during the final laps; Vettel's fourth-place finish was not enough to keep Hamilton from clinching his fourth World Drivers' Championship. Bottas was promoted to second place due to the collision between Hamilton and Vettel but was unable to challenge Verstappen for the race win, eventually settling for the second step on the podium.

During qualifying of the Brazilian Grand Prix, Hamilton made a mistake on his first run in Q1 and smashed into the barriers after losing control of his car, thus making him start the race from last position. Meanwhile, Bottas won a battle for pole position with Vettel, edging out the German by just 0.038 seconds at the last moment of the session. Bottas lost the start to Vettel on Sunday which meant that he finished the race in second position. The main excitement of the race was provided by a drive through the field from Hamilton who made his way within sight of the top three from a start in the pitlane. He finished in P4, only 8 tenths off Räikkönen in third and only 5.468 seconds behind the race winner.

Mercedes dominated qualifying of the Abu Dhabi Grand Prix with Bottas achieving back to back pole positions for the first time in his career. He was nearly 2 tenths up on Hamilton who made a small mistake on the final corner during his last run which made him start in P2, ahead of Vettel who was another 3 tenths behind. It was the first front row lockout for the team since the Azerbaijan Grand Prix. Mercedes capped off the season with their fourth 1-2 in an assured drive that was never under threat. Bottas won the race from pole with Hamilton being close all race but unable to make a move on his Finnish teammate. Vettel finished a distant third, being down 20 seconds on race winner Bottas.

=== Final standings ===
Having won 12 races, the Mercedes AMG F1 W08 EQ Power+ was not quite as successful as its all-conquering predecessor. The team finished the season with 668 Constructors' Championship points, clinching the fourth consecutive World Constructors' Championship with a healthy advantage of 146 points over their nearest rivals Ferrari. However, Mercedes gained their lowest Constructors' Championship points total since the start of the hybrid turbo era in 2014 and for the first time their drivers didn't finish the season in P1 and P2 with Bottas being third behind Vettel. The car also showcased near-perfect reliability, recording only 1 retirement all season. Mercedes thus completed 98.6% of all laps run in 2017 (2,392), running 11,997 race kilometers. They led the statistic and were ahead of their customer teams Force India (11,660 race kilometers) and Williams (11,029 race kilometers).

== Later uses ==
On 10 December 2019, 9-time MotoGP champion Valentino Rossi drove the W08 in W10 livery at the Ricardo Tormo circuit.

== Complete Formula One results ==
(key) (results in bold indicate pole position; results in italics indicate fastest lap)

Year	Entrant	Engine	Tyres	Drivers	Grands Prix																				Points	WCC
Year	Entrant	Engine	Tyres	Drivers	AUS	CHN	BHR	RUS	ESP	MON	CAN	AZE	AUT	GBR	HUN	BEL	ITA	SIN	MAL	JPN	USA	MEX	BRA	ABU	Points	WCC
2017	Mercedes AMG Petronas Motorsport	Mercedes-AMG F1 M08 EQ Power+	**P**																							
2017	Mercedes AMG Petronas Motorsport	Mercedes-AMG F1 M08 EQ Power+	**P**	Valtteri Bottas	3	6	**3**	1	Ret	4	2	2	**1**	2	3	5	2	3	5	4	5	2	**2**	**1**	**668**	**1st**
2017	Mercedes AMG Petronas Motorsport	Mercedes-AMG F1 M08 EQ Power+	**P**	Lewis Hamilton	**2**	**1**	2	4	**1**	7	**1**	**5**	4	**1**	4	**1**	**1**	1	**2**	**1**	**1**	9	4	2	**668**	**1st**

Awards
Preceded by Mercedes F1 W07 Hybrid	Autosport; Racing Car of the Year; 2017	Succeeded by Mercedes AMG F1 W09 EQ Power+
