= Ferrari SF71H =

2018 Formula One racing car by Ferrari

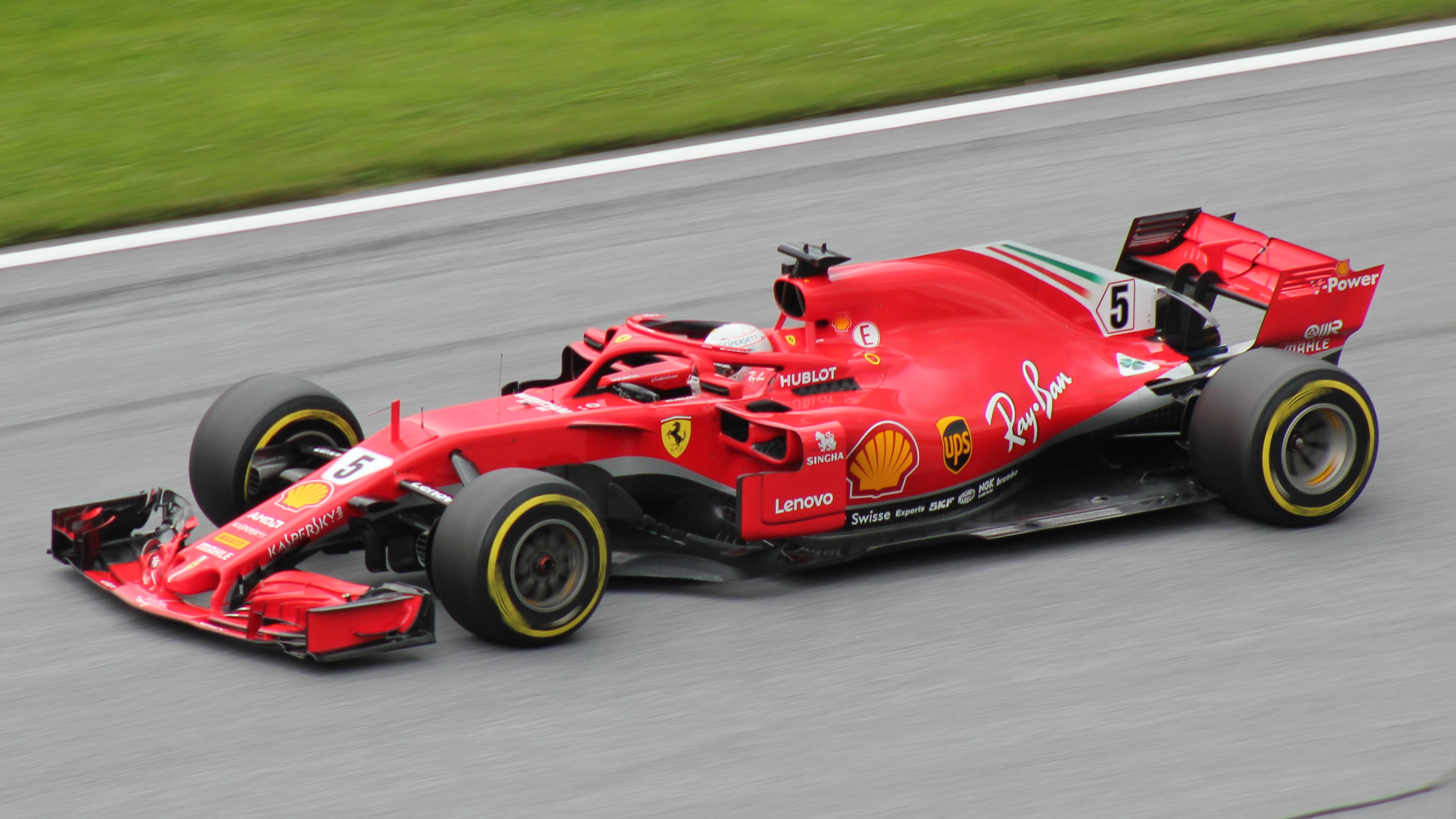
- The SF71H, driven by Sebastian Vettel, during the Austrian Grand Prix
- Category: Formula One
- Constructor: Ferrari
- Designers: Mattia Binotto (Technical Director); Simone Resta (Chief Designer); Fabio Montecchi (Deputy Chief Designer); Andrea De Zordo (Deputy Chief Designer); Corrado Onorato (Deputy Chief Designer); Tiziano Battistini (Head of Chassis Design); Giacomo Tortora (Head of Performance Development); Daniele Casanova (Head of Performance Systems); Enrico Cardile (Head of Aerodynamics); David Sanchez (Chief Aerodynamicist); Corrado Iotti (Chief Engineer, Power Unit)
- Predecessor: Ferrari SF70H
- Successor: Ferrari SF90

Technical specifications
- Wheelbase: 3621 mm
- Engine: Ferrari 062 EVO 1.6 L (98 cu in) direct injection V6 turbocharged engine limited to 15,000 RPM in a mid-mounted, rear-wheel drive layout
- Electric motor: Ferrari kinetic and thermal energy recovery systems
- Transmission: Eight forward and one reverse gears
- Weight: 733 kg (1,616.0 lb)
- Fuel: Shell V-Power
- Lubricants: Shell Helix Ultra
- Brakes: Brembo ventilated and cross-drilled carbon ceramic discs
- Tyres: Pirelli P Zero (dry); Pirelli Cinturato (wet); OZ forged magnesium wheels: 13"

Competition history
- Notable entrants: Scuderia Ferrari (Rounds 1-16); Scuderia Ferrari Mission Winnow (Rounds 17-21)
- Notable drivers: 5. (Germany) Sebastian Vettel; 7. (Finland) Kimi Räikkönen
- Debut: 2018 Australian Grand Prix
- First win: 2018 Australian Grand Prix
- Last win: 2018 United States Grand Prix
- Last event: 2018 Abu Dhabi Grand Prix
Races	Wins	Podiums	Poles	F/Laps
21	6	24	6	4

The Ferrari SF71H was a Formula One racing car designed and constructed by Scuderia Ferrari to compete during the 2018 FIA Formula One World Championship. The chassis was designed by Mattia Binotto, Simone Resta, Enrico Cardile and David Sanchez with Corrado Iotti leading the powertrain design. The car was driven by Sebastian Vettel and Kimi Räikkönen, and made its competitive debut at the 2018 Australian Grand Prix.

Keeping with his tradition to name his cars, Vettel named his SF71H "Loria".

== Design and development ==
The SF71H features a longer wheelbase than its predecessor, the SF70H, and a revised cooling system. Ferrari have further evolved their philosophy of moving the crash structure outside the sidepods, creating a complex bargeboard array and sidepod inlet configuration, even including winglets on the rear view mirrors. A small shark fin goes down the engine cover, and supports a low T-wing above the exhaust and spanning almost the entire width of the rear wing.

One of the most significant updates of the season came at the Spanish Grand Prix, where Ferrari changed the way the mirrors were mounted, switching from a standard position to having them mounted on the Halo. They also added a winglet above each mirror, but the FIA deemed them illegal, despite claims from the team that they were intended to support the mirrors. Therefore, they were removed at the next race in Monaco.

After being outperformed by Mercedes at the Singapore, Russian, and Japanese Grand Prix, Ferrari removed some of their updates at the United States Grand Prix, which allowed them to compete with and beat Mercedes again.

SF71H at the Museo Ferrari

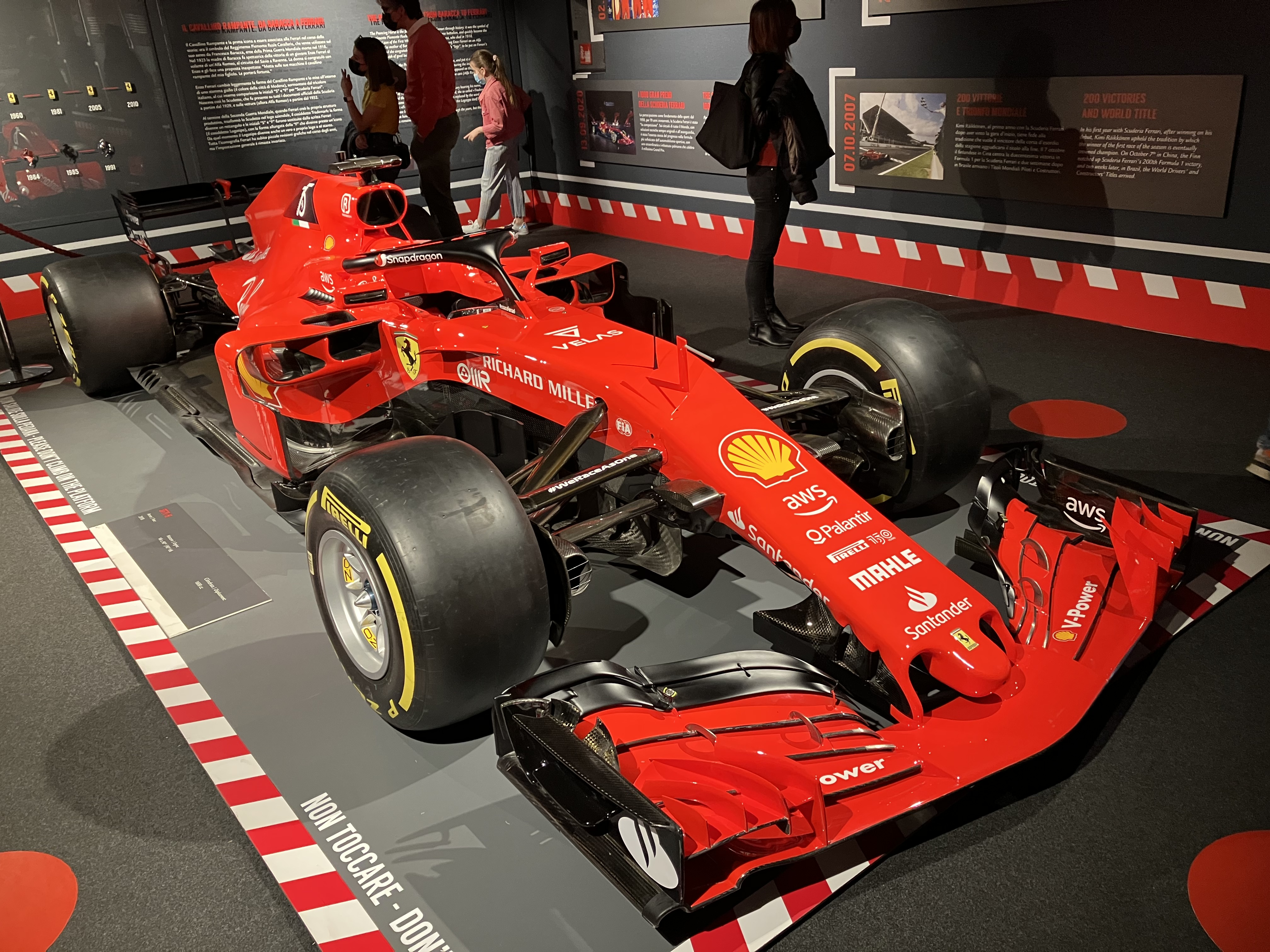

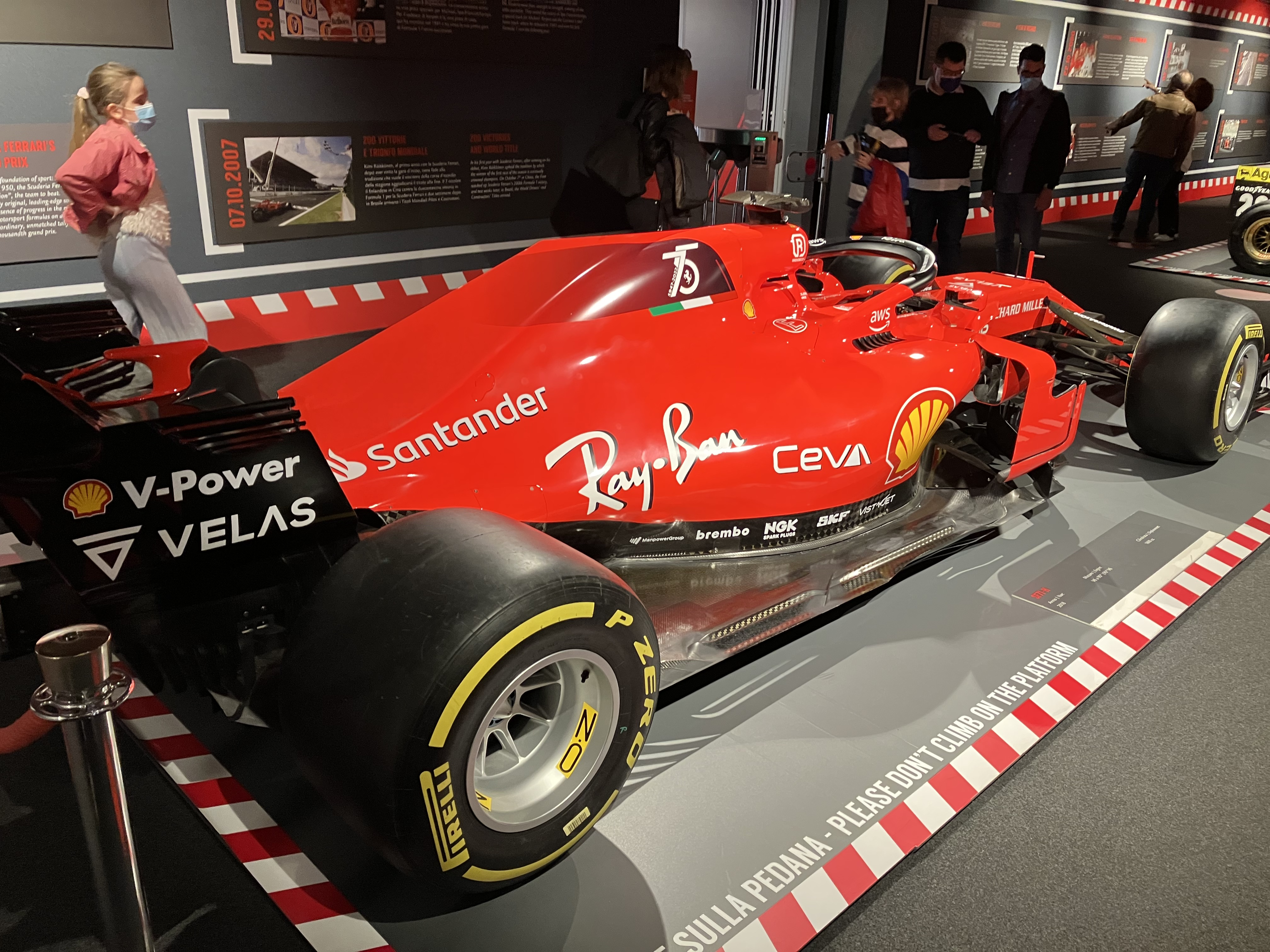

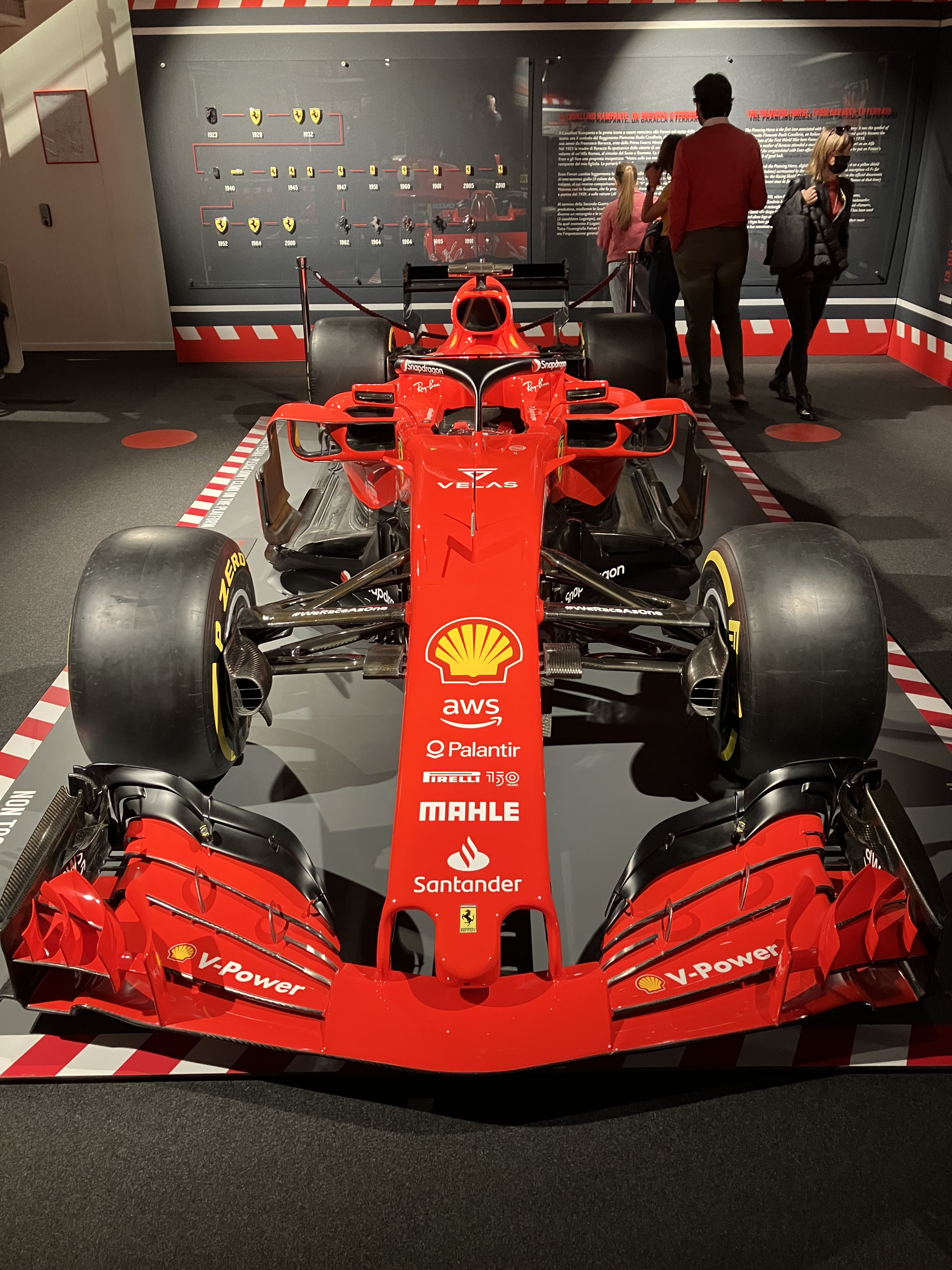

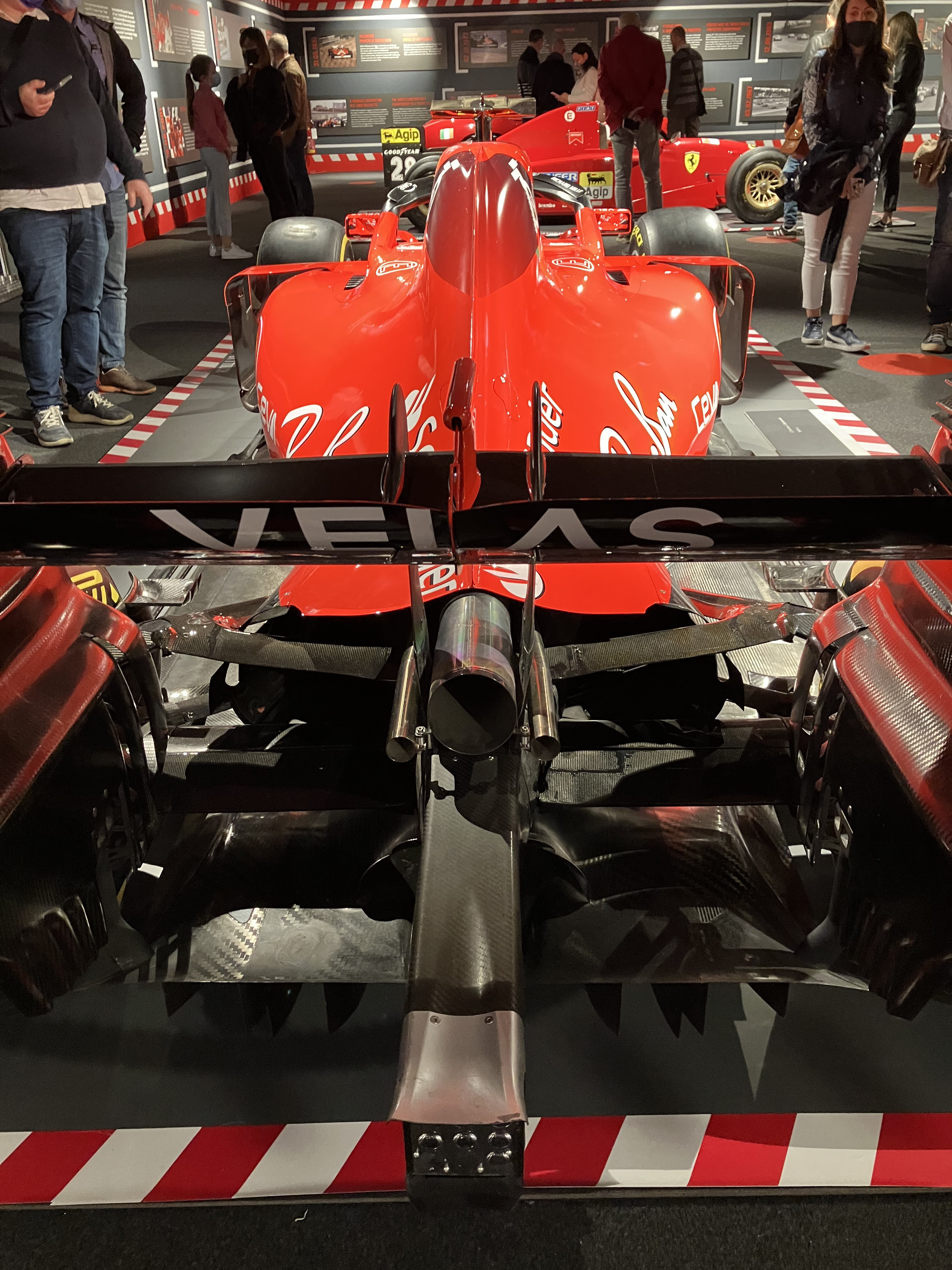

== Racing history ==
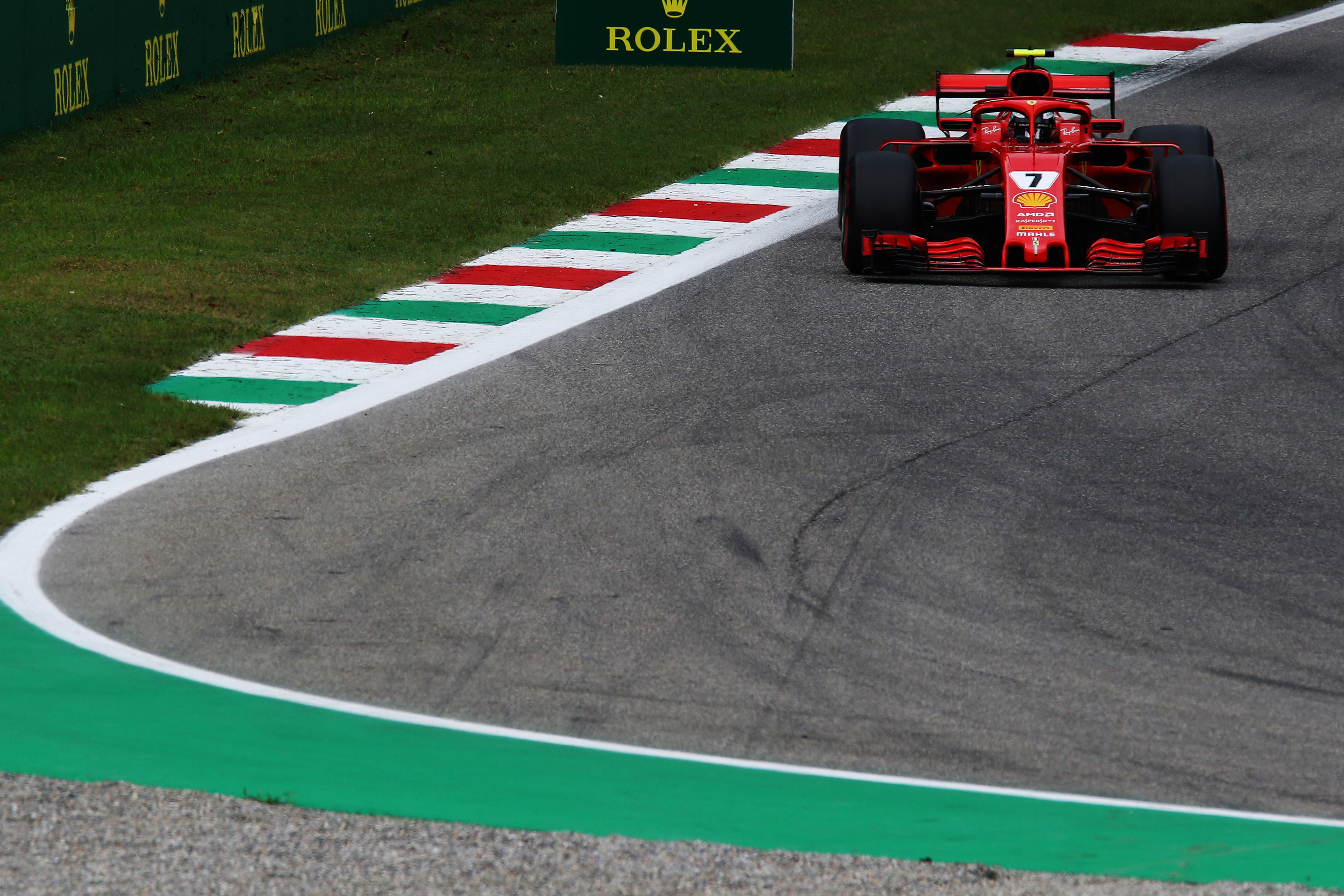
Räikkönen at the Italian Grand Prix, where he took his final pole position of his career; He would finish the race in second

The SF71H took two wins in the three opening Grands Prix and set two new track records at the Bahrain International Circuit and the Shanghai International Circuit while qualifying on pole. Thus in these three races the car seemed to be faster than their rivals Mercedes AMG F1 W09 EQ Power+. As of the end of the 2024 championship, the SF71H is Ferrari's most successful car in the hybrid engine era (2014–present), scoring 6 wins (5 by Vettel, 1 by Räikkönen) and 24 podiums, surpassing its predecessor, the SF70H, that had 5 wins and 20 podiums.

== Sponsorship ==
As Santander dropped their sponsorship, the livery features very little white, similar to the livery used in the 2007, 2008, and 2009 cars. At the Japanese Grand Prix, Ferrari introduced a new livery, carrying the logo of Mission Winnow, a joint promotion with major sponsor Philip Morris International.

For the Hungarian Grand Prix, the Ferrari crew wore black armbands in honour of former Ferrari chairman Sergio Marchionne, who died following complications from surgery on 25 July 2018. Black stripes were also incorporated into the cars of Ferrari as well as engine customer teams Haas and Sauber in tribute to Marchionne.

At the Belgian Grand Prix, as a tribute to the victims of the Genoa motorway bridge collapse, Ferrari included a decal with the words "Nei Nostri Cuori." for the race weekend on their cars.

== Legacy ==
Until the 2020 Belgian Grand Prix, the SF71H driven by Sebastian Vettel held the fastest overall lap record at Circuit de Spa-Francorchamps beating that of Neel Jani in the Porsche 919 Evo. The car that beat the SF71H's record is the Mercedes F1 W11. Until the 2020 Italian Grand Prix, the SF71H driven by Kimi Räikkönen held the lap record at Autodromo Nazionale di Monza, beating that of Juan Pablo Montoya in the Williams FW26 and the lap with the highest average speed of 263.587 km/h (163.785 mph). That record was also broken by the Mercedes F1 W11 with an average speed of 264.363 km/h (164.268 mph).

== Later use ==
After the 2018 season, the car was driven by Mick Schumacher, Callum Ilott, Robert Shwartzman and Oliver Bearman in the end-of-year test.

Bearman drove the SF71H at the Goodwood Festival of Speed in 2023 and 2024, with the car being painted in the current year's livery.

== Complete Formula One results ==
(key) (results in bold indicate pole position; results in italics indicate fastest lap)

Year	Entrant	Engine	Tyres	Drivers	Grands Prix																					Points	WCC
Year	Entrant	Engine	Tyres	Drivers	AUS	BHR	CHN	AZE	ESP	MON	CAN	FRA	AUT	GBR	GER	HUN	BEL	ITA	SIN	RUS	JPN	USA	MEX	BRA	ABU	Points	WCC
2018	Scuderia Ferrari	Ferrari 062 EVO	**P**	Kimi Räikkönen	3	Ret	3	2	Ret	4	6	3	2	3	3	3	Ret	**2**	5	4	5	1	3	3	Ret	**571**	**2nd**
2018	Scuderia Ferrari	Ferrari 062 EVO	**P**	Sebastian Vettel	1	**1**	**8**	**4**	4	2	**1**	5	3	1	**Ret**	2	1	4	3	3	6	4	2	6	2	**571**	**2nd**
