= Mark Ellis (Formula One) =

British engineer

- Born: 22 June 1964 (age 62)
- Citizenship: British
- Occupation: Engineer
- Known for: Formula One engineer

Mark Ellis (born 22 June 1964) is a British Formula One engineer. He was most recently the performance director at the Mercedes AMG Petronas Motorsport Formula One team.

== Career ==
Ellis studied mechanical engineering at the University of Southampton before joining Ricardo Consulting Engineers as an engine development engineer.

Ellis' motorsport career began in 1988, achieving success with numerous teams in various categories, in positions ranging from leading the development of Super Touring cars to WRC 4WD transmissions. He gained prominence by participating in the Williams team's program for the British Touring Car Championship (BTCC), when he worked with Williams Renault Dealer Racing on the 1995 touring car project, the Renault Laguna, who dominated the 1997 season with Alain Menu at the wheel and, in 2000, he and Menu were together again at Prodrive, champions of the World Rally Championship, where Ellis designed the Ford Mondeo that Menu drove to the last BTCC championship before the series went through a radical regulation change.

He ended up switching to Formula 1 in 2000, with British American Racing (BAR) as head of mechanical design. Ellis was already a close collaborator with the team's technical director, Malcolm Oastler, since the beginning of BAR, he joined BAR, that year, from Prodrive to occupy the position of chief mechanical designer. After a short stint at British American Racing in 2001, just before the San Marino Grand Prix, he moved to Jaguar Racing as its chief race engineer.

On 1 June 2002 it was announced that BAR's new chief of staff, David Richards, decided to bring Ellis back to his team and that the Brit would take up the position of head of vehicle performance at BAR. Ellis remained at Brackley as the team transitioned into Honda.

Ellis then took on a new challenge at Red Bull Racing as the chief vehicle performance engineer, a position he held until the end of the 2013 season, winning the constructors and drivers titles from 2010 to 2013 with the Austrian outfit.

In December 2013, Mercedes announced the hiring of Mark Ellis where he would assume the position of performance director, returning to Brackley in June 2014. With Mercedes, Ellis added five more consecutive constructors and drivers titles (2014–2018) to his already impressive resume.

In July 2018, it was announced that Mark Ellis would step down from Mercedes, and take a sabbatical while Loïc Serra would replace him as performance director.
