= Loïc Serra =

French engineer (born 1972)

- Born: 30 March 1972 (age 54); Nancy, France
- Citizenship: French
- Education: Arts et Métiers ParisTech
- Occupation: Engineer
- Years active: 1996-present
- Employer: Scuderia Ferrari
- Known for: Formula One engineer
- Title: Chassis Technical Director

Loïc Serra (born 30 March 1972) is a French Formula One engineer and Chassis Technical Director of Scuderia Ferrari HP.

== Career ==
Serra studied at Arts et Métiers ParisTech in Aix-en-Provence and Paris, specialising in Mechanical Engineering. After graduating from university, Serra started his career in motorsport with Michelin, working as a quality engineer in Bad Kreuznach, Germany, before moving to the company's main Research and Development centre in Clermont-Ferrand, France. His department worked on new tyres and suspension concepts allowing Serra to gain a deep understanding in vehicle dynamics and tyre interactions.

In 2002, Serra was given the task to develop a new innovative suspension system for racing cars and other high-performance vehicles. This suspension system was proposed to the Michelin customer teams in Formula One and formed Serra's first encounter with the series. Shortly afterwards, Serra joined the Formula One department at Michelin and remained there until the tyre manufacturer withdrew from the series in 2006.

As Serra wished to stay in Formula One, he joined the BMW Sauber F1 Team to become the Head of Vehicle Performance for the Swiss team. After BMW's withdrawal from Formula One, Serra decided to seek a new challenge so he joined the new Mercedes works team. In 2019, Serra was promoted to performance director at Mercedes. His role involves working with tyre, suspension, aerodynamic, and power unit experts to ensure the various characteristics work towards an overall package that is both fast and reliable. In 2023, it became public that he will join Scuderia Ferrari in 2025. Ferrari confirmed the news in May 2024, announcing that Serra would join the team beginning October 2024 as the team's Chassis Technical Director.
