= 2010 V8 Supercar season =

Seasons
- ← 2009 2011 →

The 2010 V8 Supercar season was the fourteenth series in which V8 Supercars have contested the senior Australian touring car series. It was the 51st year of touring car racing in Australia since the first runnings of the Australian Touring Car Championship, known today as the V8 Supercar Championship Series, and the fore-runner of the present day Bathurst 1000, the Armstrong 500.

The season began on 18 February at the Yas Marina Circuit in Abu Dhabi and finished on 5 December at the Homebush Street Circuit. 2010 featured the fourteenth V8 Supercar Championship Series, consisting of 14 events covering five states and the Northern Territory of Australia as well as events in the United Arab Emirates, Bahrain and New Zealand. There was also a stand-alone event supporting the 2010 Australian Grand Prix. It also featured the eleventh second-tier Development Series, this year referred to as the Fujitsu V8 Supercar Series. It was a seven-round series. A third third-tier series was run, the Shannons V8 Touring Car National Series. Its five-round series was held on Shannons Nationals Motor Racing Championships events.

== Season review ==
The first title to be decided saw Tony Evangelou dominate Shannons V8 Touring Car National Series, wrapping up the series a round early at Eastern Creek on 12 September.

Steve Owen clinched the Fujitsu V8 Supercar Series with a race to spare, and eventually won the championship by over 300 points, taking four of the seven round victories over the course of the season, and a total of eight race wins. Tim Blanchard finished as season runner-up, taking a round victory at Townsville where he won his only race of the season. Consistent finishing helped James Moffat and Nick Percat – neither won a race – finish in third and fourth places respectively, ahead of David Russell, who won the round at Bathurst. Cameron McConville took the other round win, in a single appearance at Winton, while Taz Douglas, Jack Perkins and Paul Morris each took race victories.

The main V8 Supercar Championship Series was last to be decided, with the championship not being decided until the final race in Homebush on 5 December. James Courtney won his first championship, finishing every race en route to a 65-point title-winning margin over two-time defending champion Jamie Whincup. Courtney's championship was the first for Dick Johnson Racing since John Bowe won the title in 1995. Courtney took five race wins to Whincup's nine, but retirements for the latter at Ipswich and Homebush denied him the opportunity of matching Mark Skaife as a three-time successive champion. Mark Winterbottom finished third in the championship, winning races at Hidden Valley, Townsville and Symmons Plains, as he finished 60 points over Whincup's team-mate Craig Lowndes. Lowndes won the endurance rounds at Phillip Island and Bathurst with Skaife, as well as a solo win at Symmons Plains. Holden Racing Team's Garth Tander rounded out the top five in the drivers' championship, recovering from a poor beginning to the season, taking a double victory in Adelaide, a win (with Cameron McConville) in Surfers Paradise, as well as a victory in the non-championship BRC IMPCO V8 Supercars GP Challenge for V8 Supercar Championship Series competitors.

Other race victories were taken by Lee Holdsworth, Paul Dumbrell, Jonathon Webb and Steve Owen (partnering Whincup in Surfers Paradise), which were the first victories for each driver with the exception of Holdsworth. Triple Eight Race Engineering won the Teams' Championship via the top four championship placings of Whincup and Lowndes.

== Race calendar ==
Dates sourced from:

Race title	Circuit	City / state	Round	Date	Winner	Team	Report
(United Arab Emirates) Yas V8 400	Yas Marina Circuit	Yas Island; United Arab Emirates	VSC 1 VSC 2	18–20 February	Jamie Whincup; Jamie Whincup	Triple Eight Race Engineering; Triple Eight Race Engineering	report
(Bahrain) Desert 400	Bahrain International Circuit	Manama; Bahrain	VSC 3 VSC 4	25–27 February	Jamie Whincup; Jamie Whincup	Triple Eight Race Engineering; Triple Eight Race Engineering	report
(South Australia) Clipsal 500	Adelaide Street Circuit	Adelaide; South Australia	VSC 5 VSC 6	11–14 March	Garth Tander; Garth Tander	Holden Racing Team; Holden Racing Team	report
(South Australia) Clipsal 500	Adelaide Street Circuit	Adelaide; South Australia	FVS 1	11–14 March	Steve Owen	Greg Murphy Racing	
(Victoria (state)) BRC IMPCO V8 Supercars; GP Challenge	Albert Park	Melbourne; Victoria		26–28 March	Garth Tander	Holden Racing Team	report
(Tasmania) Launceston	Symmons Plains Raceway	Launceston; Tasmania	SVTC 1	10–11 April	Terry Wyhoon	Image Racing	
(New Zealand) ITM Hamilton 400	Hamilton Street Circuit	Hamilton; New Zealand	VSC 7 VSC 8	16–18 April	Jamie Whincup; Jamie Whincup	Triple Eight Race Engineering; Triple Eight Race Engineering	report
(Queensland) Ipswich 300	Queensland Raceway	Ipswich; Queensland	VSC 9 VSC 10	30 April - 2 May	James Courtney; James Courtney	Dick Johnson Racing; Dick Johnson Racing	report
(Queensland) Ipswich 300	Queensland Raceway	Ipswich; Queensland	FVS 2	30 April - 2 May	Steve Owen	Greg Murphy Racing	
(Victoria (state)) Winton	Winton Motor Raceway	Benalla; Victoria	VSC 11; VSC 12	14–16 May	James Courtney; James Courtney	Dick Johnson Racing; Dick Johnson Racing	report
(Victoria (state)) Winton	Winton Motor Raceway	Benalla; Victoria	FVS 3	14–16 May	Cameron McConville	Eggleston Motorsport	
(South Australia) Mallala	Mallala Motor Sport Park	Mallala; South Australia	SVTC 2	29–30 May	Tony Evangelou	A.N.T. Racing	
(Northern Territory) Skycity Triple Crown	Hidden Valley Raceway	Darwin; Northern Territory	VSC 13; VSC 14	18–20 June	Mark Winterbottom; Jamie Whincup	Ford Performance Racing; Triple Eight Race Engineering	report
(Victoria (state)) Winton	Winton Motor Raceway	Benalla; Victoria	SVTC 3	26–27 June	Tony Evangelou	A.N.T. Racing	
(Queensland) Sucrogen Townsville 400	Townsville Street Circuit	Townsville; Queensland	VSC 15; VSC 16	9–11 July	Jamie Whincup; Mark Winterbottom	Triple Eight Race Engineering; Ford Performance Racing	report
(Queensland) Sucrogen Townsville 400	Townsville Street Circuit	Townsville; Queensland	FVS 4	9–11 July	Tim Blanchard	Sonic Motor Racing Services	
(Victoria (state)) L & H 500	Phillip Island Grand Prix Circuit	Phillip Island; Victoria	VSC 17	10–12 September	Craig Lowndes; Mark Skaife	Triple Eight Race Engineering	report
(New South Wales) Eastern Creek	Eastern Creek Raceway	Sydney; New South Wales	SVTC 4	11–12 September	Tony Evangelou	A.N.T. Racing	
(New South Wales) Supercheap Auto Bathurst 1000	Mount Panorama Circuit	Bathurst; New South Wales	VSC 18	7–10 October	Craig Lowndes; Mark Skaife	Triple Eight Race Engineering	report
(New South Wales) Supercheap Auto Bathurst 1000	Mount Panorama Circuit	Bathurst; New South Wales	FVS 5	7–10 October	David Russell	MW Motorsport	
(Queensland) Armor All Gold Coast 600	Surfers Paradise Street Circuit	Surfers Paradise; Queensland	VSC 19 VSC 20	21–24 October	Garth Tander; Cameron McConville; Jamie Whincup; Steve Owen	Holden Racing Team Triple Eight Race Engineering	report
(Victoria (state)) Sandown	Sandown Raceway	Melbourne; Victoria	SVTC 5	23–24 October	Tony Evangelou	A.N.T. Racing	
Falken Tasmania Challenge	Symmons Plains Raceway	Launceston; Tasmania	VSC 21; VSC 22	12–14 November	Craig Lowndes; Mark Winterbottom	Triple Eight Race Engineering; Ford Performance Racing	report
(Victoria (state)) Norton 360 Sandown Challenge	Sandown Raceway	Melbourne; Victoria	VSC 23; VSC 24	19–21 November	Paul Dumbrell; James Courtney	Rod Nash Racing; Dick Johnson Racing	
(Victoria (state)) Norton 360 Sandown Challenge	Sandown Raceway	Melbourne; Victoria	FVS 6	19–21 November	Steve Owen	Greg Murphy Racing	
(New South Wales) Sydney Telstra 500	Homebush Street Circuit	Sydney; New South Wales	VSC 25; VSC 26	3–5 December	Jonathon Webb; Lee Holdsworth	Tekno Autosports; Garry Rogers Motorsport	
(New South Wales) Sydney Telstra 500	Homebush Street Circuit	Sydney; New South Wales	FVS 7	3–5 December	Steve Owen	Greg Murphy Racing	

- VSC - V8 Supercar Championship Series
- SVTC - Shannons V8 Touring Car Series
- FVS - Fujitsu V8 Supercar Series
