= Roamni =

Australian audio-sharing and storytelling technology firm

Roamni is an Australian-based audio-sharing and storytelling technology firm headquartered in Melbourne, Australia. The firm was founded by co-founders Jason Fabbri and Greg Curcio in 2016. Initial seed funding for the business was provided by RMIT as part of the RMIT Activator program. Following a closed prototyping and customer validation period with an Australian app development company, Roamni officially launched into the market in February 2018.

Roamni allows users to upload, listen, rate, and share audio content in the form of tours and stories. It offers a wide variety of user-generated content in a multi-sided marketplace. Available content includes audio tours with waypoints linked to a map and Story of Place which is a single point on a map with an audio story attached.

The vast majority of its content is free to view, but there are exceptions, including tours that are priced by contributors of user-generated content. Contributors to Roamni, known as Hosts earn revenue from any audio content they upload and choose to put a price on.

In 2017, the company was recognized by Prince Andrew, Duke of York as part of the Pitch Palace Australia 1.0 national finalist group at Government House in Sydney, NSW.

Roamni was featured in the Apple and RMIT partnership for Australia's first app-building course in Apple's Swift coding language, designed to increase capability and literacy in the digital space.

At the 2018 Australian Grand Prix, Roamni announced that it had achieved Australian national coverage, and plans for international growth and expanding to areas outside of audio such as augmented reality and experiences for businesses, councils, precincts, and brands.
