= 2017 Australian Grand Prix =

Race 1 of 20 in the 2017 Formula One World Championship
← Previous race	Next race →

Race details
- Date: 26 March 2017
- Official name: 2017 Formula 1 Rolex Australian Grand Prix
- Location: Melbourne Grand Prix Circuit, Melbourne, Australia
- Course: Temporary street circuit
- Course length: 5.303 km (3.295 miles)
- Distance: 57 laps, 302.271 km (187.822 miles)
- Scheduled distance: 58 laps, 307.574 km (191.117 miles)
- Weather: Partly cloudy 24 °C (75 °F) air temperature 31–36 °C (88–97 °F) track temperature 2 m/s (4.5 mph; 7.2 km/h) wind from the northwest
- Attendance: 296,600

Pole position
Driver	(United Kingdom) Lewis Hamilton	Mercedes
- Time: 1:22.188

Fastest lap
Driver	(Finland) Kimi Räikkönen	Ferrari
- Time: 1:26.538 on lap 56

Podium
First	(Germany) Sebastian Vettel	Ferrari
Second	(United Kingdom) Lewis Hamilton	Mercedes
Third	(Finland) Valtteri Bottas	Mercedes

The 2017 Australian Grand Prix (formally known as the 2017 Formula 1 Rolex Australian Grand Prix) was a Formula One motor race that took place on 26 March 2017 in Melbourne. The race was contested over fifty-seven laps of the Melbourne Grand Prix Circuit and was the first round of the 2017 FIA Formula One World Championship. The race marked the 82nd race in the combined history of the Australian Grand Prix – which dates back to the 100 Miles Road Race of 1928 – and the 22nd time the event was held at the Melbourne Grand Prix Circuit. The reigning World Champion Nico Rosberg was the winner of the 2016 race, but he did not defend his win as he retired from the sport after the 2016 season.

Mercedes driver Lewis Hamilton started the race from pole, matching Ayrton Senna's record of six pole positions in Australia. Sebastian Vettel won the race, which was his and Ferrari's first win since the 2015 Singapore Grand Prix. Hamilton finished second, with Valtteri Bottas completing the podium in third on his début for Mercedes.

The race was also Ferrari's first win in Australia since the 2007 edition.

== Report ==
=== Background ===
==== Circuit modifications ====
With the technical regulations undergoing a revision for the 2017 season, the FIA requested that every circuit on the calendar undergo revisions to update safety features. Organisers of the race introduced Tecpro barriers to the run-off areas at the fastest points of the circuit, and re-profiled tyre barriers.

==== Driver changes ====
Before the beginning of the third free practice session, Sauber announced that Pascal Wehrlein would not start the race. Wehrlein had sustained a back injury in an accident at the Race of Champions during the winter pre-season. Although Wehrlein was certified as fit to take part in the Grand Prix ahead of the first practice session, he withdrew as a precaution, citing the increased physical demands of the 2017 specification of cars and the lack of sustained running during pre-season testing as compromising his ability to complete a full race distance. He was replaced by Antonio Giovinazzi for the third session, qualifying and the race.

Lance Stroll made his Formula One début with Williams. Giovinazzi and Stroll were the only rookies in the field, with Stoffel Vandoorne at McLaren starting his first full season in the sport after a one-off appearance at the 2016 Bahrain Grand Prix and Esteban Ocon at Force India starting his first full season in the sport after starting the last 9 races of the 2016 season.

==== Tyres ====
Pirelli supplied the teams with ultrasoft, supersoft and soft tyres. Usually, teams are allowed to choose an individual selection of thirteen different sets for every driver. However, due to the selection deadline falling before the pre-season test when teams were first able to drive with the new compounds, Pirelli allocated every driver the same sets. These were seven sets of ultrasoft, four sets of supersoft and two sets of soft tyres.

== Qualifying ==
Pos.	Car no.	Driver	Constructor	Qualifying times			Final grid
Pos.	Car no.	Driver	Constructor	Q1	Q2	Q3	Final grid
1	44	(United Kingdom) Lewis Hamilton	Mercedes	1:24.191	1:23.251	1:22.188	1
2	5	(Germany) Sebastian Vettel	Ferrari	1:25.210	1:23.401	1:22.456	2
3	77	(Finland) Valtteri Bottas	Mercedes	1:24.514	1:23.215	1:22.481	3
4	7	(Finland) Kimi Räikkönen	Ferrari	1:24.352	1:23.376	1:23.033	4
5	33	(Netherlands) Max Verstappen	Red Bull Racing-TAG Heuer	1:24.482	1:24.092	1:23.485	5
6	8	(France) Romain Grosjean	Haas-Ferrari	1:25.419	1:24.718	1:24.074	6
7	19	(Brazil) Felipe Massa	Williams-Mercedes	1:25.099	1:24.597	1:24.443	7
8	55	(Spain) Carlos Sainz Jr.	Toro Rosso	1:25.542	1:24.997	1:24.487	8
9	26	(Russia) Daniil Kvyat	Toro Rosso	1:25.970	1:24.864	1:24.512	9
10	3	(Australia) Daniel Ricciardo	Red Bull Racing-TAG Heuer	1:25.383	1:23.989	No time	15^{1}
11	11	(Mexico) Sergio Pérez	Force India-Mercedes	1:25.064	1:25.081		10
12	27	(Germany) Nico Hülkenberg	Renault	1:24.975	1:25.091		11
13	14	(Spain) Fernando Alonso	McLaren-Honda	1:25.872	1:25.425		12
14	31	(France) Esteban Ocon	Force India-Mercedes	1:26.009	1:25.568		13
15	9	(Sweden) Marcus Ericsson	Sauber-Ferrari	1:26.236	1:26.465		14
16	36	(Italy) Antonio Giovinazzi	Sauber-Ferrari	1:26.419			16
17	20	(Denmark) Kevin Magnussen	Haas-Ferrari	1:26.847			17
18	2	(Belgium) Stoffel Vandoorne	McLaren-Honda	1:26.858			18
19	18	(Canada) Lance Stroll	Williams-Mercedes	1:27.143			20^{1}
20	30	(United Kingdom) Jolyon Palmer	Renault	1:28.244			19
107% time: 1:30.084

Notes

- ^1 – Daniel Ricciardo and Lance Stroll received five-place grid penalties for unscheduled gearbox changes.

== Race ==
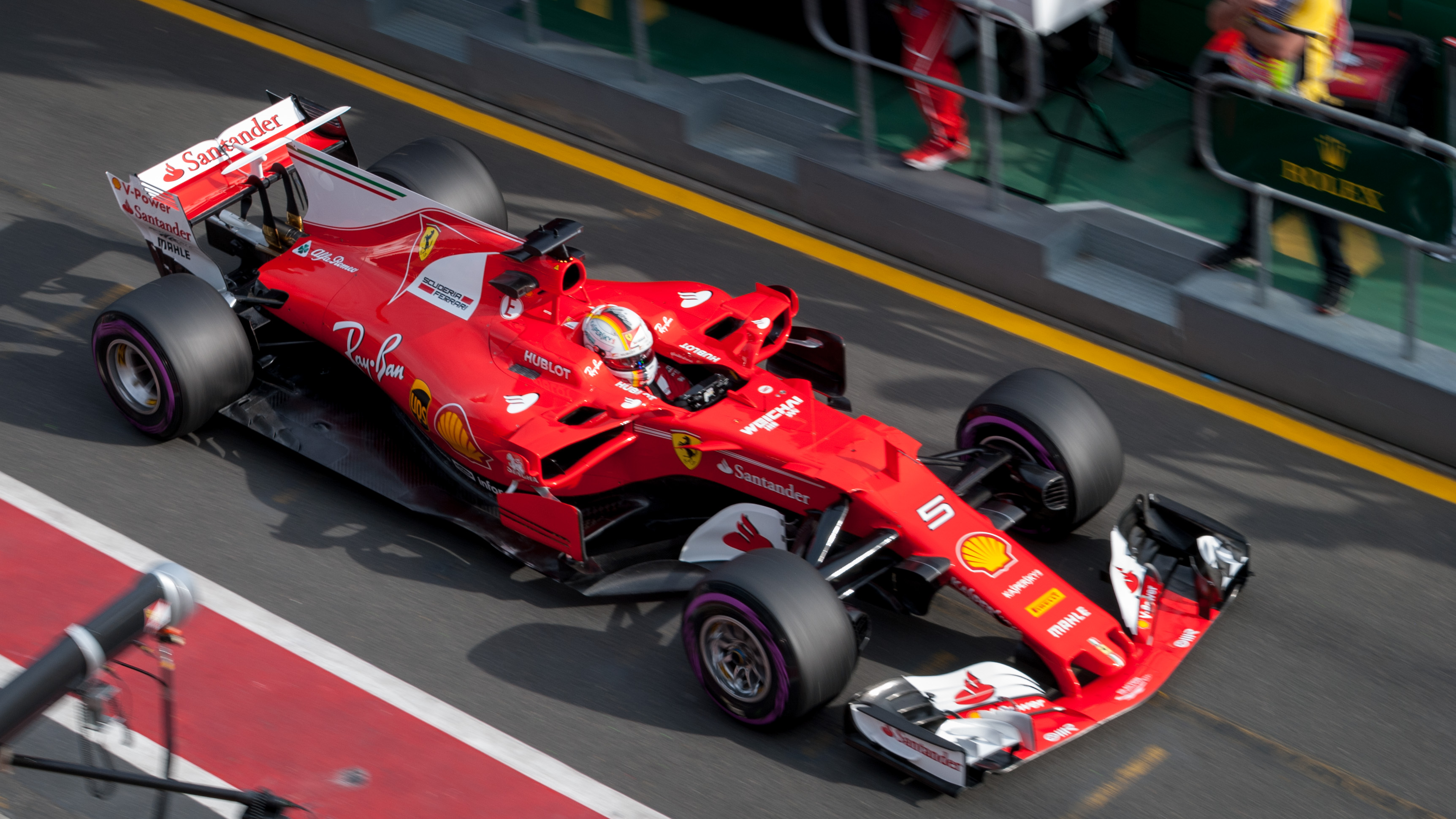
Sebastian Vettel won the race for Scuderia Ferrari.

Sebastian Vettel claimed his first win since 2015 after beating both the Mercedes drivers, Lewis Hamilton and Valtteri Bottas, in a straight fight, Hamilton was not helped after he was held up for several laps behind Max Verstappen, the latter revealing he completed the race without a drinks bottle after the Red Bull team forgot to fit it in the car. Daniel Ricciardo's car failed on the way to the grid, eventually he joined the race on the 2nd lap but then retired on lap 26, he said afterwards he was sent out "to have some fun".

=== Race classification ===
Pos.	No.	Driver	Constructor	Laps	Time/Retired	Grid	Points
1	5	(Germany) Sebastian Vettel	Ferrari	57	1:24:11.672	2	25
2	44	(United Kingdom) Lewis Hamilton	Mercedes	57	+9.975	1	18
3	77	(Finland) Valtteri Bottas	Mercedes	57	+11.250	3	15
4	7	(Finland) Kimi Räikkönen	Ferrari	57	+22.393	4	12
5	33	(Netherlands) Max Verstappen	Red Bull Racing-TAG Heuer	57	+28.827	5	10
6	19	(Brazil) Felipe Massa	Williams-Mercedes	57	+1:23.386	7	8
7	11	(Mexico) Sergio Pérez	Force India-Mercedes	56	+1 Lap	10	6
8	55	(Spain) Carlos Sainz Jr.	Toro Rosso	56	+1 Lap	8	4
9	26	(Russia) Daniil Kvyat	Toro Rosso	56	+1 Lap	9	2
10	31	(France) Esteban Ocon	Force India-Mercedes	56	+1 Lap	13	1
11	27	(Germany) Nico Hülkenberg	Renault	56	+1 Lap	11	
12	36	(Italy) Antonio Giovinazzi	Sauber-Ferrari	55	+2 Laps	16	
13	2	(Belgium) Stoffel Vandoorne	McLaren-Honda	55	+2 Laps	18	
Ret	14	(Spain) Fernando Alonso	McLaren-Honda	50	Broken floor	12	
Ret	20	(Denmark) Kevin Magnussen	Haas-Ferrari	46	Suspension	17	
Ret	18	(Canada) Lance Stroll	Williams-Mercedes	40	Brakes	20	
Ret	3	(Australia) Daniel Ricciardo	Red Bull Racing-TAG Heuer	25	Fuel cell	PL^{1}	
Ret	9	(Sweden) Marcus Ericsson	Sauber-Ferrari	21	Hydraulics	14	
Ret	30	(United Kingdom) Jolyon Palmer	Renault	15	Brakes	19	
Ret	8	(France) Romain Grosjean	Haas-Ferrari	13	Water leak	6	

Notes

- ^1 – Daniel Ricciardo started the race from pit lane after his car stopped on the way to the grid and could not be restarted in time for the formation lap.

== Championship standings after the race ==
Drivers' Championship standings

Pos.	Driver	Points
1	(Germany) Sebastian Vettel	25
2	(United Kingdom) Lewis Hamilton	18
3	(Finland) Valtteri Bottas	15
4	(Finland) Kimi Räikkönen	12
5	(Netherlands) Max Verstappen	10

Constructors' Championship standings

Pos.	Constructor	Points
1	(Italy) Ferrari	37
2	(Germany) Mercedes	33
3	(Austria) Red Bull Racing-TAG Heuer	10
4	(United Kingdom) Williams-Mercedes	8
5	Force India-Mercedes	7

- Note: Only the top five positions are included for both sets of standings.

== See also ==
- 2017 Coates Hire Supercars Challenge

Previous race: 2016 Abu Dhabi Grand Prix	FIA Formula One World Championship; 2017 season	Next race: 2017 Chinese Grand Prix
Previous race: 2016 Australian Grand Prix	Australian Grand Prix	Next race: 2018 Australian Grand Prix
