= Supercars Challenge (event) =

Annual non-championship motor racing event

(Victoria (state)) Supercars Challenge
- Race Information
Venue	Albert Park Circuit
Number of times held	32
First held	1985
Last held	2017
- Race Format
- Race 1
Laps	13
Distance	70 km
- Race 2
Laps	13
Distance	70 km
- Race 3
Laps	13
Distance	70 km
- Race 4
Laps	13
Distance	70 km
- Last Event (2017)
- Overall Winner
(New Zealand) Fabian Coulthard	DJR Team Penske
- Race Winners
(New Zealand) Scott McLaughlin	DJR Team Penske
(New Zealand) Fabian Coulthard	DJR Team Penske
(New Zealand) Fabian Coulthard	DJR Team Penske
(Australia) Chaz Mostert	Rod Nash Racing

The Supercars Challenge was an annual non-championship motor racing event held for cars from the Supercars Championship, and formerly from V8 Supercars, the Shell Championship Series and the Australian Touring Car Championship. The event was held on the Albert Park Circuit in Albert Park, Victoria, Australia as a support event to the Australian Grand Prix.

First held as a Formula One World Championship support race in 1985, the event was originally held at the Adelaide Street Circuit until the Australian Grand Prix moved to Melbourne for 1996. From 2018 onwards, the event was contested for championship points and became known as the Melbourne 400.

== Formats ==
The event's format changed several times over its history. As the event was a non points-paying event in the championship, several methods have been used to try to add a point of difference to the races, particularly from the late 2000s onwards. In 2008 and 2009, a Manufacturers' Challenge was introduced, pitting traditional rivals Ford and Holden against each other. In 2011, a portion of the grid was reversed between qualifying and the Top 10 Shootout. The size of this portion was determined by the provisional polesitter who drew a number between eight and twenty at random - which coincided with the number of cars whose position would be inverted.

In 2012, Supercars used a 'knockout' style qualifying race in order to set the grid for the rest of the weekend. This involved the bottom three cars being forced to retire on each of laps three to eight until only the top 10 remained, who completed the race. 2014 introduced both double file rolling starts to each race as well as awarding double points for the final race of the weekend, a move designed to imitate Formula One's plans for a double points race in their own season finale in Abu Dhabi.

As of the final event in 2017, the format consisted of four races either thirteen laps or approximately thirty minutes of length. Practice and qualifying were held on Thursday, two races were held on Friday, and then one each on Saturday and Sunday. 2017 saw the removal of a progressive grid across the event, with four ten-minute qualifying sessions held on Thursday which dictated the grid for the four races. As since 2014, each race features a double file rolling start. The points from each race were accumulated to find an event winner, however, the points didn't count towards the championship.

== History ==
=== 1980s ===
The Adelaide layout used for the event between 1985 and 1995.

Touring cars had often been a support category for Australian Grands Prix prior to 1985, but it was not until 1985 that the Australian Grand Prix joined the Formula One World Championship. In the 1980s, as well as racing in the ATCC, many teams and drivers entered in a range of non-championship exhibition races, as well as in other championships such as the Australian Manufacturers' Championship, which had all adopted the FIA's international Group A regulations for the 1985 season.

The first year supporting the Grand Prix in Adelaide, won by Dick Johnson in the only victory in his Ford Mustang GT, was notable for Gerhard Berger competing in both the Grand Prix, for Arrows-BMW, and in the Group A touring car support race in an ex-Schnitzer Motorsport BMW 635 CSi. Berger had to obtain special permission to enter the Group A race, as it was outside regulations for drivers to in other race cars in the 24 hours before a Grand Prix (British Renault team driver Derek Warwick was actually fined US$10,000 for running a few unauthorized laps of the local dirt track Speedway in a Sprintcar the night before the race). Eventually, he only lasted three laps in the Group A race before being spun off by local veteran John Harvey in the second Holden Dealer Team VK Commodore at Turn 1. The 1986 and 1987 races were part of the short-lived South Pacific Touring Car Championship. 1988 saw the last of the single races on the Saturday afternoon in Adelaide (the Saturday races always started at 3 PM local time, exactly 1 hour after final Formula One qualifying) with the Holden Special Vehicles team, consisting of former F1 drivers Larry Perkins and 1967 World Drivers' Champion Denny Hulme, staging a 1-2 finish in front of a lot of their old F1 contemporaries.

In 1989, there were two touring car races on the Grand Prix weekend for the first time with a shorter race starting at 10:30 AM added to the F1 race day (Sunday) program. This continued until the final Grand Prix in Adelaide in

=== 1990s ===
In 1991, Jim Richards became the first driver to win the Grand Prix support event and the ATCC in the same year. Richards was the only driver to achieve this in the Adelaide era, with several drivers able to do the double in the Melbourne era of the event. In 1994, John Bowe and Larry Perkins had a famous battle in wet conditions, with the two going side-by-side for much of the final lap. In 1996, the Australian Grand Prix moved from Adelaide to Melbourne, and also from a November to a March date. Glenn Seton won the first race at the new venue, with Peter Brock winning the event. From 1996 to 1998, there were two touring car categories on the support card for the Grand Prix, with cars from the Australian Super Touring Championship joining the ATCC as a support category. In 1997, 1993 Grand Prix motorcycle racing champion Kevin Schwantz competed in the event as a guest driver in a Ford EF Falcon. In 1997 and 1998, Russell Ingall was unbeaten, winning all seven of the races in the two years. He remains the most successful driver at the event with a record eight race wins, and an equal-record three event wins.

=== 2000s ===
With support from event sponsor Hot Wheels, the 2000 event saw media personality and former Australian Rules footballer Sam Newman make a guest appearance. Despite qualifying nearly sixteen seconds off Mark Skaife's pole time, Newman finished all three races in his Gibson Motorsport-prepared Holden VS Commodore. In 2001, Marcos Ambrose qualified on pole at the Grand Prix on his series debut. In 2002, there was no official points scoring system, however, the winner of the final race of the weekend, Craig Lowndes, was considered the event winner. In 2003, the V8 Supercar Development Series joined the main series on the Grand Prix support card for the first and so far only time. In 2005, Brad Jones Racing's John Bowe and Brad Jones finished first and second in the second race after being the only cars to start the race, in drying conditions, on slick tyres (pitstops were not permitted). It was the first win for Brad Jones Racing in the category. In 2007, Supercars didn't appear at the Grand Prix for the first, and so far only time, due to a scheduling and logistics conflict; the second round of the 2007 V8 Supercar Championship Series was scheduled approximately 3500 km from Melbourne at Barbagallo Raceway near Perth, Western Australia one week after the Grand Prix.

=== 2010s ===
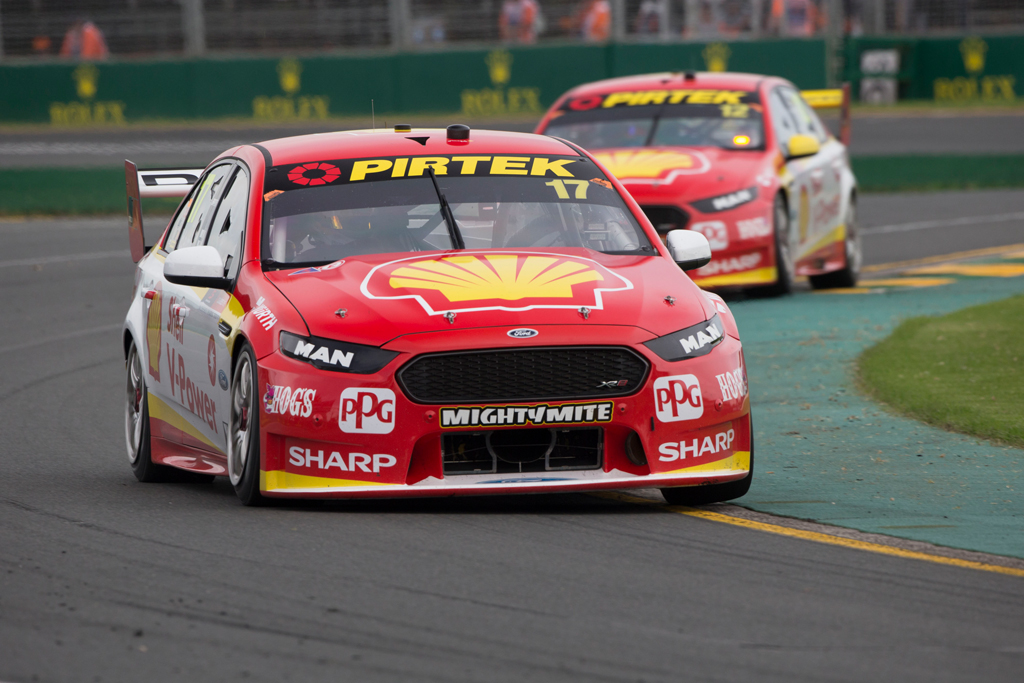
DJR Team Penske's Scott McLaughlin leads team-mate Fabian Coulthard during the 2017 event.

In 2011 Jason Richards, who had stepped down from full-time driving due to a cancer diagnosis during 2010, made a one-off appearance in the Albert Park 400. He finished second in the second race of the weekend. Richards died in December 2011. 2011 also saw the opening of a new dedicated pit building for the Supercars Championship, adjacent to the Formula One pits. This allowed the series to have races with full pitstops for the first time. Scott McLaughlin won his first Supercars race in 2013 in the final race of the weekend. In 2014, he won the event outright, providing Volvo with their first race win on their comeback to Australian motorsport. On the same weekend, Nissan scored the first pole position of their own comeback, with Michael Caruso at the wheel. Between 2012 and 2014, New Zealand drivers won nine races in a row at the event, thanks to McLaughlin, Fabian Coulthard and Shane van Gisbergen. Mark Winterbottom broke that trend with four wins out of four races at the 2015 event. In 2016, Triple Eight Race Engineering had their own clean-sweep of the event, with the four race wins split between Jamie Whincup and Van Gisbergen, providing Van Gisbergen with his first race wins for the team. The 2017 event saw DJR Team Penske win their first races since Team Penske took a stake in the team in 2014. In 2017, Chaz Mostert won what would become the final non-championship race at the circuit, but only after both Coulthard, who won the event, and Whincup had tyre failures during the fourth race of the weekend.

== Demise ==
In May 2017 it was announced that the 2018 event would be part of the 2018 Supercars Championship, the first time the circuit has been included as part of the championship. The event became known as the Melbourne 400 which included some longer distance races in a revamped format.

== Broadcast and scheduling conflicts ==
At various stages of the event's history, two different television networks in Australia held the Formula One and Supercars broadcast rights. This meant that the Supercars races at the Grand Prix were often broadcast on a different network to the championship events. This clash of broadcasters, as well as the lack of adequate pit facilities (which later opened in 2011), was often cited as a reason that the Albert Park event remained a non-championship exhibition event for a long period. Starting in 2015, Network Ten and Fox Sports had a shared deal for both Formula One and Supercars, the first time they have been on the same network since 2006. According to Supercars' chief executive James Warburton, the 2015 Formula One broadcast deal between Ten and Fox Sports was completed too late for any changes to the 2015 Supercars calendar, but stated they were still working towards adding championship status to the Albert Park event in the future. However, the 2016 calendar announced in September 2015 once again listed the event as a non-championship round.

Prior to the 2016 event, Warburton threatened that the championship would not extend its deal beyond 2018 if championship status was not granted. Andrew Westacott, the boss of the Australian Grand Prix Corporation, responded that the lack of championship status was due to Formula One Management only granting thirty minute slots for support categories, and that could not be negotiated by the AGPC. Despite the constraints, other championships, such as Australian GT and Porsche Carrera Cup Australia, have held championship rounds within the FOM confines. The sale of Formula One to Liberty Media in 2016 proved a catalyst for a renegotiation of the deal, with the event finally attaining championship status, with some longer race slots, for 2018.

== Winners ==
Year	Driver	Team	Car	Circuit	Report
1985	(Australia) Dick Johnson	Dick Johnson Racing	Ford Mustang GT	Adelaide	Report
1986	(Australia) Allan Grice	Roadways Racing	Holden VK Commodore SS Group A	Adelaide	Report
1987	(Australia) Dick Johnson	Dick Johnson Racing	Ford Sierra RS500	Adelaide	Report
1988	(Australia) Larry Perkins	Perkins Engineering	Holden VL Commodore SS Group A SV	Adelaide	Report
1989	(Australia) Tony Longhurst	LoGaMo Racing	Ford Sierra RS500	Adelaide	Report
1990	(Australia) Glenn Seton	Glenn Seton Racing	Ford Sierra RS500	Adelaide	Report
1991	(New Zealand) Jim Richards	Gibson Motorsport	Nissan Skyline R32 GT-R	Adelaide	Report
1992	(New Zealand) Jim Richards	Gibson Motorsport	Nissan Skyline R32 GT-R	Adelaide	Report
1993	(Australia) Wayne Gardner	Holden Racing Team	Holden VP Commodore	Adelaide	Report
1994	(Australia) John Bowe	Dick Johnson Racing	Ford EB Falcon	Adelaide	Report
1995	(Australia) John Bowe	Dick Johnson Racing	Ford EF Falcon	Adelaide	Report
1996	(Australia) Peter Brock	Holden Racing Team	Holden VR Commodore	Albert Park	Report
1997	(Australia) Russell Ingall	Perkins Engineering	Holden VS Commodore	Albert Park	Report
1998	(Australia) Russell Ingall	Perkins Engineering	Holden VS Commodore	Albert Park	Report
1999	(Australia) Craig Lowndes	Holden Racing Team	Holden VT Commodore	Albert Park	Report
2000	(Australia) Mark Skaife	Holden Racing Team	Holden VT Commodore	Albert Park	Report
2001	(New Zealand) Paul Radisich	Dick Johnson Racing	Ford AU Falcon	Albert Park	Report
2002	(Australia) Craig Lowndes	Gibson Motorsport	Ford AU Falcon	Albert Park	Report
2003	(Australia) Russell Ingall	Stone Brothers Racing	Ford BA Falcon	Albert Park	Report
2004	(Australia) Jason Bright	Paul Weel Racing	Holden VY Commodore	Albert Park	Report
2005	(Australia) Mark Skaife	Holden Racing Team	Holden VZ Commodore	Albert Park	Report
2006	(New Zealand) Steven Richards	Perkins Engineering	Holden VZ Commodore	Albert Park	Report
2007	not held				
2008	(Australia) Garth Tander	Holden Racing Team	Holden VE Commodore	Albert Park	Report
2009	(Australia) Craig Lowndes	Triple Eight Race Engineering	Ford FG Falcon	Albert Park	Report
2010	(Australia) Garth Tander	Holden Racing Team	Holden VE Commodore	Albert Park	Report
2011	(Australia) Jamie Whincup	Triple Eight Race Engineering	Holden VE Commodore	Albert Park	
2012	(Australia) Mark Winterbottom	Ford Performance Racing	Ford FG Falcon	Albert Park	Report
2013	(New Zealand) Fabian Coulthard	Brad Jones Racing	Holden VF Commodore	Albert Park	Report
2014	(New Zealand) Scott McLaughlin	Garry Rogers Motorsport	Volvo S60	Albert Park	
2015	(Australia) Mark Winterbottom	Prodrive Racing Australia	Ford FG X Falcon	Albert Park	
2016	(New Zealand) Shane van Gisbergen	Triple Eight Race Engineering	Holden VF Commodore	Albert Park	Report
2017	(New Zealand) Fabian Coulthard	DJR Team Penske	Ford FG X Falcon	Albert Park	Report

== Multiple winners ==
=== By driver ===
Wins	Driver	Years
3	(Australia) Russell Ingall	1997, 1998, 2003
3	(Australia) Craig Lowndes	1999, 2002, 2009
2	(Australia) Dick Johnson	1985, 1987
2	(New Zealand) Jim Richards	1991, 1992
2	(Australia) John Bowe	1994, 1995
2	(Australia) Mark Skaife	2000, 2005
2	(Australia) Garth Tander	2008, 2010
2	(Australia) Mark Winterbottom	2012, 2015
2	(New Zealand) Fabian Coulthard	2013, 2017

=== By team ===
Wins	Team
7	Holden Racing Team
6	Dick Johnson Racing^{1}
4	Perkins Engineering
3	Gibson Motorsport
3	Triple Eight Race Engineering
2	Prodrive Racing Australia^{2}

=== By manufacturer ===
Wins	Manufacturer
16	Holden
13	Ford
2	Nissan

Notes

- ^1 - Since 2015, Dick Johnson Racing are known as DJR Team Penske, hence their statistics are combined.
- ^2 – Prodrive Racing Australia was known as Ford Performance Racing from 2003 to 2014, hence their statistics are combined.

== Event sponsors ==
- 1989: Yokohama
- 1990: Ansett Air Freight
- 1991: Hush Puppies
- 1992: Clarks Shoes
- 1993: Peter Jackson
- 1994: Sensational Adelaide
- 1995: EDS
- 1996–98: TAC
- 1999–2001: Hot Wheels
- 2002–04: Netspace
- 2005: Qantas
- 2006: Panasonic
- 2008–09: Sprint Gas
- 2010: BRC IMPCO
- 2013–15: MSS Security
- 2016–17: Coates Hire

== See also ==
- Melbourne SuperSprint
- Australian Grand Prix
