= 2017 Coates Hire Supercars Challenge =

(Victoria (state)) 2017 Coates Hire Supercars Challenge
Event Information
- Date: 23–26 March 2017
- Location: Melbourne, Victoria
- Venue: Melbourne Grand Prix Circuit
- Weather: Fine

Results
Race 1
Distance	13 laps	70 km
Pole position	Fabian Coulthard; DJR Team Penske	1:54.3972
Winner	Scott McLaughlin; DJR Team Penske	27:13.5519
Race 2
Distance	13 laps	70 km
Pole position	Fabian Coulthard; DJR Team Penske	1:54.8949
Winner	Fabian Coulthard; DJR Team Penske	27:09.0306
Race 3
Distance	13 laps	70 km
Pole position	Fabian Coulthard; DJR Team Penske	1:54.5983
Winner	Fabian Coulthard; DJR Team Penske	25:37.8132
Race 4
Distance	13 laps	70 km
Pole position	Jamie Whincup; Triple Eight Race Engineering	1:54.6607
Winner	Chaz Mostert; Rod Nash Racing	25:38.1620

The 2017 Coates Hire Supercars Challenge was a motor racing event for Supercars Championship, held on the weekend of 23 to 26 March 2017. The event was held at the Melbourne Grand Prix Circuit in Melbourne, Victoria, and consisted of four races of 70 kilometres in length. It was a non-championship event, contested by teams taking part in the 2017 Supercars Championship, and was held in support of the 2017 Australian Grand Prix. The event will be the 32nd and final running of the Supercars Challenge, and the last before the event attained championship status for 2018 known as the Melbourne 400.

== Report ==
=== Background ===
A new 'rapid-fire' qualifying system was introduced to the event for the 2017 season, with 4 ten minute qualifying sessions held back to back on Thursday afternoon. Taz Douglas was also confirmed to drive again for Lucas Dumbrell Motorsport shortly before the event, after originally only accepting an offer for the previous round, the Clipsal 500.

=== Practice ===
Practice summary
Session	Day	Fastest lap				
Session	Day	No.	Driver	Team	Car	Time
Practice 1	Thursday	12	(New Zealand) Fabian Coulthard	DJR Team Penske	Ford FG X Falcon	1:55.4910

== See also ==
- 2017 Supercars Championship
- 2017 Australian Grand Prix
