= 2010 Australian Grand Prix =

Race 2 of 19 in the 2010 Formula One World Championship
← Previous race	Next race →

Race details
- Date: 28 March 2010
- Official name: 2010 Formula 1 Qantas Australian Grand Prix
- Location: Albert Park Circuit, Melbourne, Australia
- Course: Temporary street circuit
- Course length: 5.303 km (3.295 miles)
- Distance: 58 laps, 307.574 km (191.118 miles)
- Weather: Overcast with light rain at start
- Attendance: 108,500

Pole position
Driver	(Germany) Sebastian Vettel	Red Bull-Renault
- Time: 1:23.919

Fastest lap
Driver	(Australia) Mark Webber	Red Bull-Renault
- Time: 1:28.358 on lap 47

Podium
First	(United Kingdom) Jenson Button	McLaren-Mercedes
Second	(Poland) Robert Kubica	Renault
Third	(Brazil) Felipe Massa	Ferrari

The 2010 Australian Grand Prix (formally the 2010 Formula 1 Qantas Australian Grand Prix) was a Formula One motor race held on 28 March 2010 at the Albert Park Circuit in Melbourne, Victoria, Australia. It was the second round of the 2010 Formula One World Championship. McLaren driver Jenson Button won the 58-lap race starting from fourth position. Robert Kubica finished second for the Renault team and Ferrari driver Felipe Massa was third.

The victory was Button's first of the season; the result moved him to third place in the World Drivers' Championship, two points behind Massa and a further four adrift of Alonso. Hamilton dropped to fourth while Rosberg maintained fifth position. McLaren reduced the gap to Ferrari in the World Constructors' Championship to be sixteen points behind. Mercedes increased their hold on third place, while Renault's strong result allowed them to tie with Red Bull for fourth place, with seventeen races left in the season.

== Background ==
The Grand Prix was contested by twelve teams with two drivers each. The teams (also known as constructors) were Red Bull, Mercedes, McLaren, Ferrari, Renault, Williams, Force India, Sauber, Toro Rosso, Lotus, Hispania and Virgin. Tyre supplier Bridgestone brought four different tyre types to the race: two dry compounds (soft "options" and hard "primes) and wet-weather compounds (intermediates and full wet). The Soft compound was distinguished by a green stripe on the tyre's side-walls with the Wet compound tyre identified by a green line at the bottom of the tyre's central groove. As was the case for all of the 2010 Grands Prix, the rules stipulated that all cars should use both types of tyre during the course of the race unless the driver used any one of two wet-weather compounds. Each driver was limited to eleven sets of dry tyres for the weekend. The circuit organisers installed a new combination kerb on the turn nine apex and artificial grass along with kerbs were extended downstream on the exits of the second and twelfth turns.

Before the race Ferrari driver Fernando Alonso led the World Drivers' Championship with 25 points, ahead of team-mate Felipe Massa (18 points) and McLaren driver Lewis Hamilton (15). Sebastian Vettel was fourth on twelve points and Nico Rosberg of Mercedes was fifth on ten points. In the World Constructors' Championship Ferrari were leading with 43 points, twenty-two points ahead of their rival McLaren in second. Mercedes were in third place with 18 points with Red Bull a further two points adrift in fourth. Force India were in fifth on two points. Alonso had won the previous race in Bahrain with his team-mate Massa finishing second. Hamilton secured third place.

The reigning Drivers' Champion Jenson Button who had won the 2009 Australian Grand Prix was pleased to be returning to Albert Park and set himself the target of finishing on the podium. After losing victory in Bahrain because of a faulty spark plug, Vettel was certain that Red Bull could challenge for the victory in Australia: "I think, coming out of Bahrain, we have a very good car. There is no reason why we shouldn't be competitive here." Vettel's teammate Mark Webber who was entering his ninth Australian Grand Prix said: "It would be a beautiful feeling to win your home race, I don't think there's any driver who wouldn't like to have a chance to win their own Grand Prix." Webber also denied a suggestion by Hamilton that he would retire after the end of the season if he won the championship. Hamilton predicted that he would encounter less problems than in Bahrain and hoped he would have a good result in Melbourne.

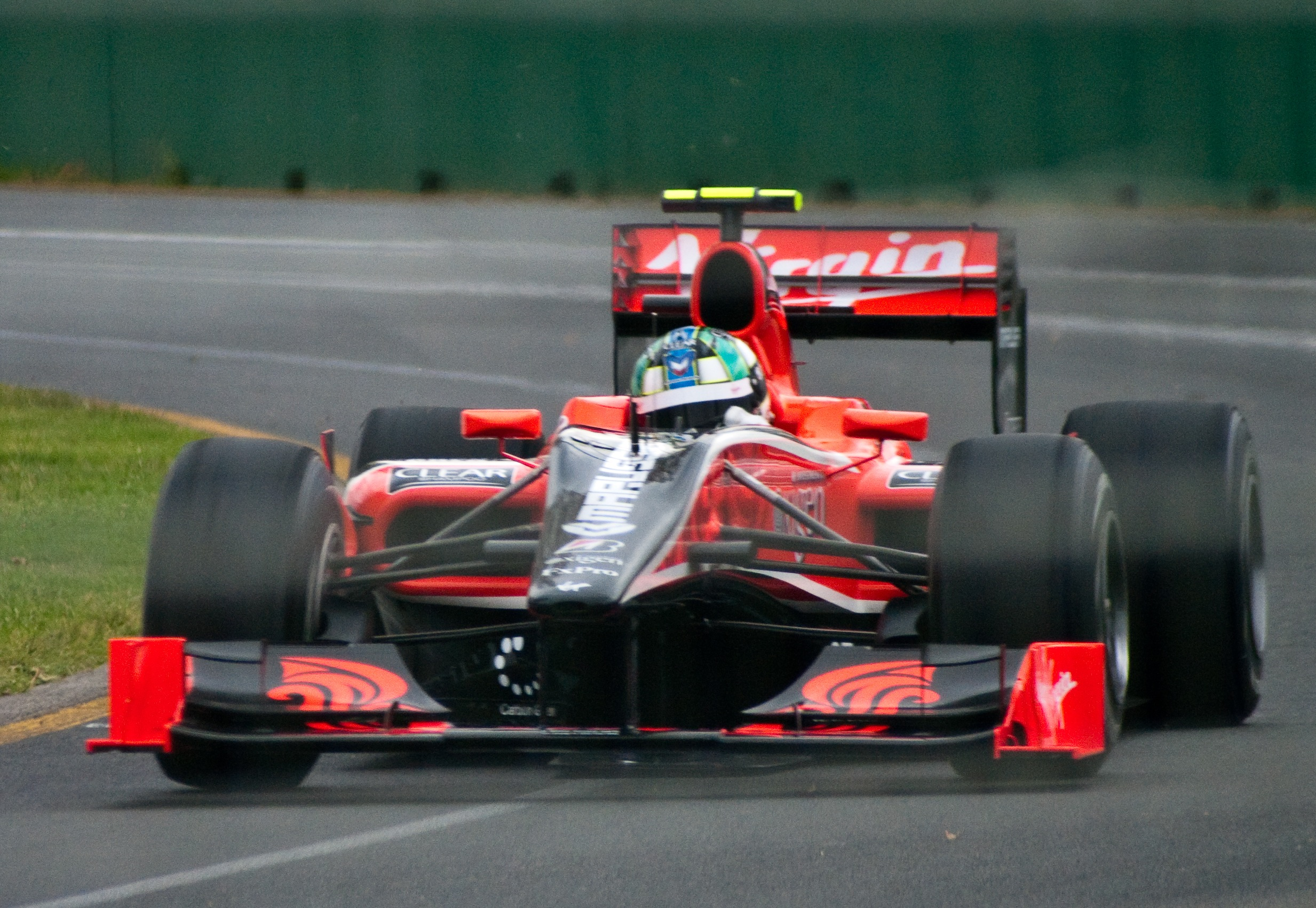
Lucas di Grassi (pictured) and his Virgin Racing teammate Timo Glock had their fuel tanks modified.

An issue concerning the start time of the race reemerged from the previous year. The start time was moved later in the day to allow European audiences to not get up early to view the event on television but it courted controversy as visibility was poor and it was retained for 2010. Lotus driver Jarno Trulli suggested the race should be started one hour earlier, while Webber, the Grand Prix Drivers' Association director, said the reason was due to commercial pressure.

Some teams made modifications to their cars in preparation for the event. Virgin Racing were granted permission from Formula One's governing body the Fédération Internationale de l'Automobile (FIA) to change the size of their car's fuel tanks because their capacity was not large enough for their drivers to complete a Grand Prix at full speed; the chassis would not be ready until the Spanish Grand Prix on 9 May. McLaren had to modify the opening of their diffusers following a rule clarification from the FIA. The team was also requested by the stewards in Bahrain to change the configuration of their front wing end-plates to a safer rounded shape for Australia. Sauber became the first team to introduce their version of McLaren's F-duct system though the air was directed onto the main section of the body wing and the F-duct itself was positioned on the car's sidepods.

== Practice ==
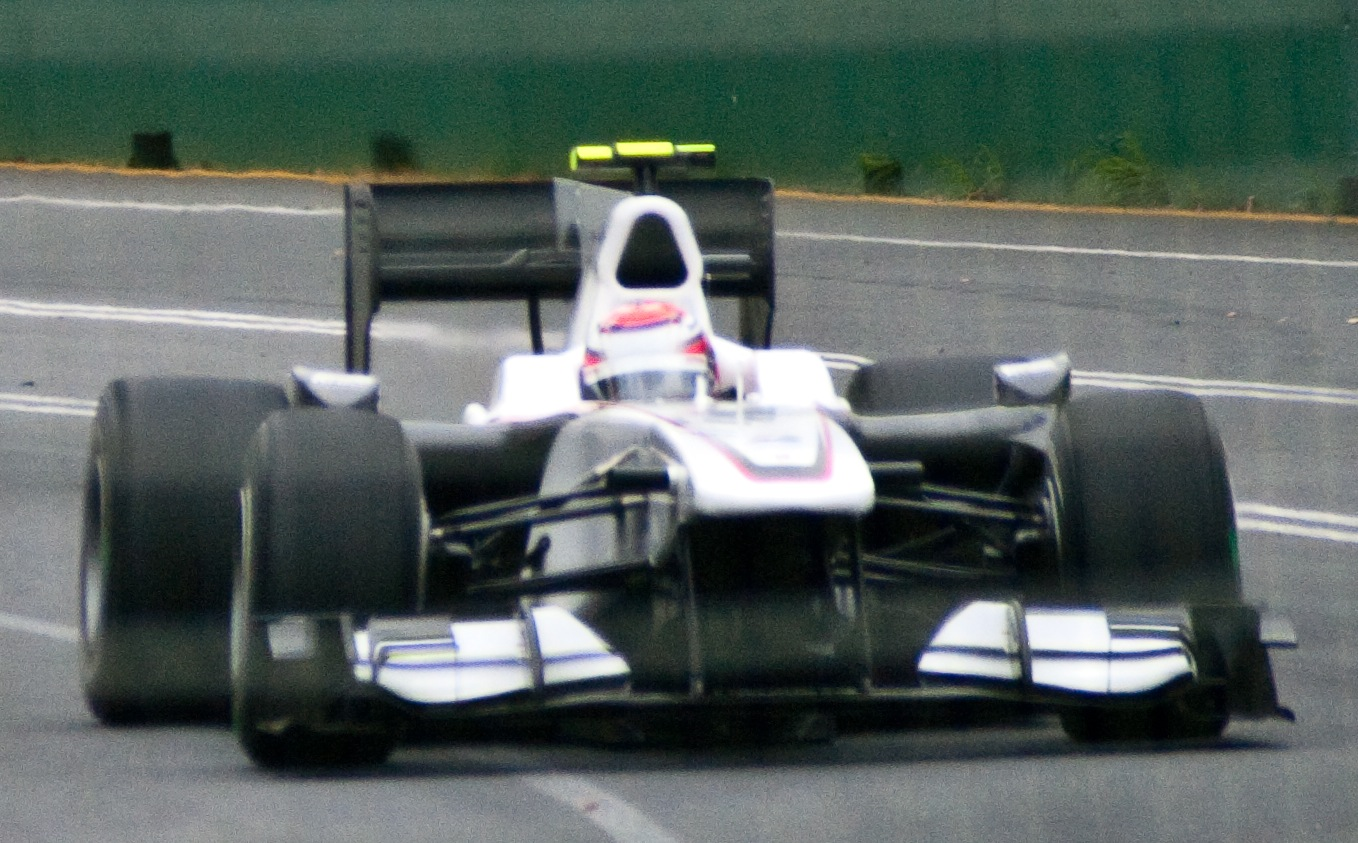
Kamui Kobayashi caused the first practice session to be stopped twice.

Three practice sessions were held before the Sunday race—two on Friday, and a third on Saturday. The Friday morning and afternoon sessions each lasted 90 minutes. The third session was held on Saturday morning and lasted an hour. Before the practice sessions, the pit lane speed limit was lowered from 100 kilometres per hour (62 mph) to 60 kilometres per hour (37 mph) after a request was made from race director Charlie Whiting on safety grounds. In the first practice session which was held in dry weather conditions, Robert Kubica set the fastest time early in the session with a lap of 1:26.927, almost two-tenths of a second faster than Rosberg. Button was third-fastest, ahead of Massa and Vettel. Alonso, Hamilton, Sébastien Buemi, Vitaly Petrov and Vitantonio Liuzzi rounded out the session's top ten drivers. Sauber driver Kamui Kobayashi caused the session to be suspended after forty minutes when he ran over a cone on the inside of turn eleven which tore off half his front wing and ran wide into the turn twelve gravel trap. A second suspension was caused after Kobayashi's second front wing broke off going into the third corner and debris was scattered across the circuit.

In the second practice session which was marked by intermittent rain showers, Hamilton recorded the fastest lap of the day, a 1:25.801; his teammate Button was second quickest and battled his teammate for quickest lap-time. Webber was third fastest, ahead of Michael Schumacher as both drivers took advantage of a drying track. Petrov and Buemi were fifth and sixth. Adrian Sutil, Liuzzi, Rubens Barrichello and Rosberg rounded out the top ten. Vettel lost control of the rear of his car and beached it in the turn six gravel trap in the final three minutes of the session. In the final practice session where traffic was heavy, Webber set the fastest lap of the weekend so far with a lap time of 1:24.719 which was set during the session's closing minutes. Alonso (who was fastest for four minutes of the session after making changes to his rear suspension and front ride height) was two-tenths of a second slower in second. Schumacher set the fastest time in the first sector to record the third fastest time. He was followed by Vettel and Rosberg. McLaren teammates Button and Hamilton were sixth and seventh. Sutil, Massa and Liuzzi completed the top ten ahead of qualifying and were within one second off Webber's pace.

== Qualifying ==
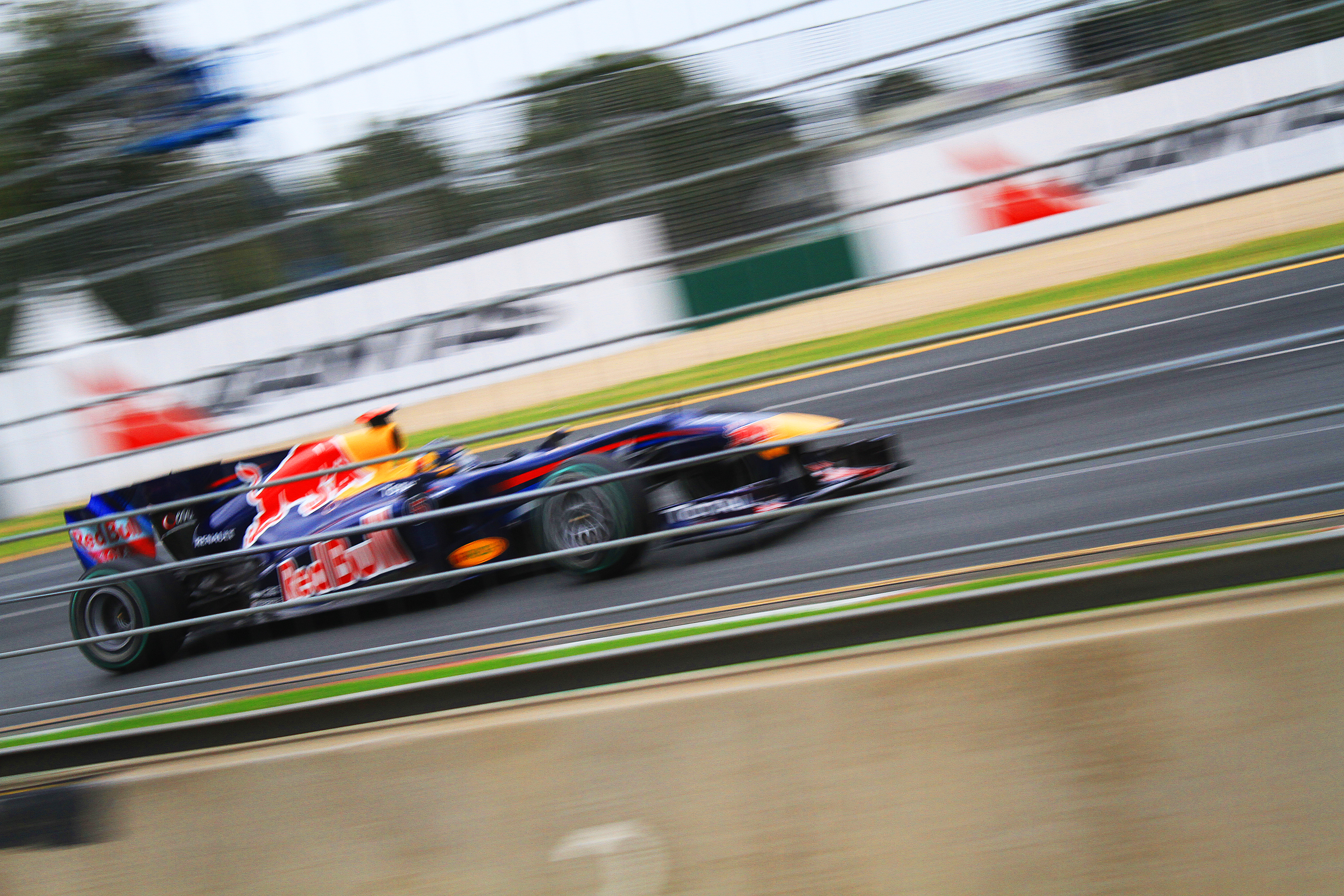
Sebastian Vettel took his second consecutive pole position of the season at Melbourne.

The qualifying session held on Saturday afternoon was split into three parts. The first part ran for 20 minutes and eliminated the cars from qualifying that finished the session 18th or lower. The second part of qualifying lasted 15 minutes and eliminated cars that finished in positions eleven to 17. The final session ran for ten minutes and determined pole position to tenth. Cars which competed in the final session of qualifying were not allowed to change tyres before the race, and as such started the race on the tyres that they set their quickest lap on. The session was held in overcast conditions; the air and track temperature was 23 °C (73 °F). Vettel set the fastest time in all three sessions and achieved his second consecutive pole position of the season and his first at Albert Park with a time of 1:23.919 despite running wide after exiting a corner on his pole lap. He was joined on the front row of the grid by teammate Webber who set a lap time 0.116 seconds off Vettel's pace and lost the chance to take pole in the third session's closing minutes after he lost time in the middle sector but was quickest in the first and final sectors. Alonso set a time of 1:24.111 to start from third place on the grid and was pleased on how qualifying went for himself. Button lacked grip and had excessive oversteer which caused him to lose time and set the fourth quickest lap but was happy with the package of his car. Massa struggled with getting his tyres up to the optimum temperature causing him to have no grip but managed to qualify fifth. The two Mercedes drivers used the soft compound tyres but only managed sixth and seventh positions with Rosberg ahead of Schumacher; Rosberg was disappointed after he made mistakes on his final run which cost him time while Schumacher also used the hard compound tyre and was caught up in traffic. Barrichello took eighth and believed he could have set a faster lap because he encountered traffic during the third session. Kubica pushed hard during the session as his car was not easy to drive and managed ninth. Sutil rounded out the top ten but believed he could have done better as he struggled to get his soft compound tyres up to temperature after doing two runs in the third session.

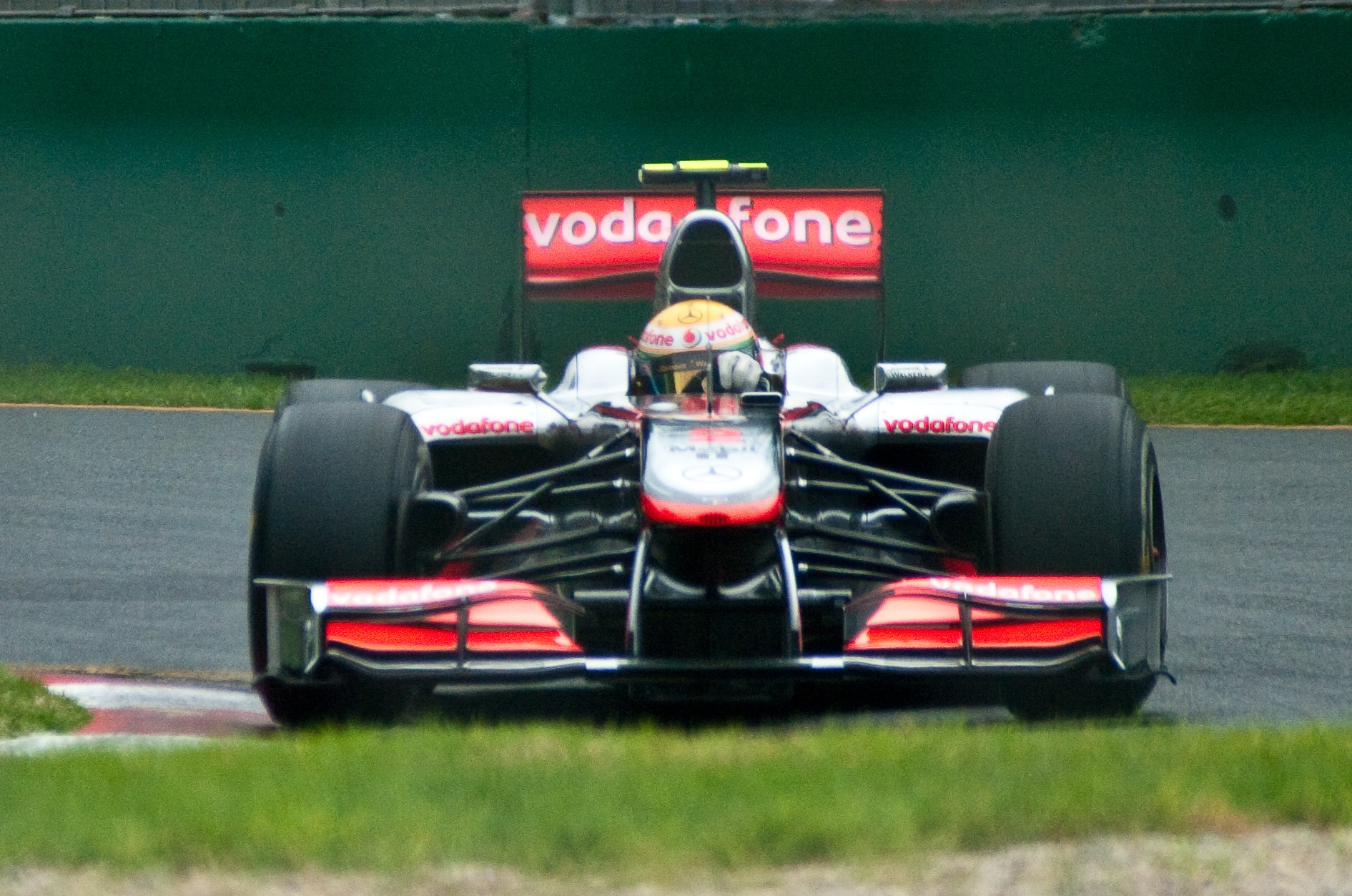
Lewis Hamilton started the race from eleventh position

Hamilton, who qualified eleventh, was the fastest driver not to advance into the final session. His best time of 1:25.184 was nearly 1.1 seconds slower than Vettel's pace in the second session. He was held up by traffic during the first run of the second session which meant he made an early pit stop for new tyres and to have a clear track. However Hamilton struggled with finding time in the final sector of the track. Buemi took twelfth, with Liuzzi in thirteenth; the latter encountered a large amount of traffic in the final sector of the circuit despite going faster in the first two sectors. Pedro de la Rosa pushed hard in qualifying to take 14th position with Nico Hülkenberg in the slower Williams 15th. Kobayashi took 16th and Jaime Alguersuari started from 17th position. Vitaly Petrov failed to move beyond the first qualifying session; the Renault driver qualified in 18th as he felt his car was not balanced correctly which meant he was unable to set good sector times on his final run. He also backed off in the final corners on his penultimate run of the session. The Lotus cars of Heikki Kovalainen and Trulli lined up in 19th and 20th respectively, with Trulli experiencing a problem with his seat which caused it to bounce in his car. Virgin Racing drivers Timo Glock and Lucas di Grassi lined up in the eleventh row of the grid, with Hispania drivers Bruno Senna and Karun Chandhok qualifying on the final two positions on the grid in 23rd and 24th.

=== Qualifying classification ===
The fastest lap in each of the three sessions is denoted in bold.

Pos	No	Driver	Constructor	Part 1	Part 2	Part 3	Grid
1	5	(Germany) Sebastian Vettel	Red Bull-Renault	**1:24.774**	**1:24.096**	**1:23.919**	1
2	6	(Australia) Mark Webber	Red Bull-Renault	1:25.286	1:24.276	1:24.035	2
3	8	(Spain) Fernando Alonso	Ferrari	1:25.082	1:24.335	1:24.111	3
4	1	(United Kingdom) Jenson Button	McLaren-Mercedes	1:24.897	1:24.531	1:24.675	4
5	7	(Brazil) Felipe Massa	Ferrari	1:25.548	1:25.010	1:24.837	5
6	4	(Germany) Nico Rosberg	Mercedes	1:24.788	1:24.788	1:24.884	6
7	3	(Germany) Michael Schumacher	Mercedes	1:25.351	1:24.871	1:24.927	7
8	9	(Brazil) Rubens Barrichello	Williams-Cosworth	1:25.702	1:25.085	1:25.217	8
9	11	(Poland) Robert Kubica	Renault	1:25.588	1:25.122	1:25.372	9
10	14	(Germany) Adrian Sutil	Force India-Mercedes	1:25.504	1:25.046	1:26.036	10
11	2	(United Kingdom) Lewis Hamilton	McLaren-Mercedes	1:25.046	1:25.184		11
12	16	(Switzerland) Sébastien Buemi	Toro Rosso-Ferrari	1:26.061	1:25.638		12
13	15	(Italy) Vitantonio Liuzzi	Force India-Mercedes	1:26.170	1:25.743		13
14	22	(Spain) Pedro de la Rosa	BMW Sauber-Ferrari	1:26.089	1:25.747		14
15	10	(Germany) Nico Hülkenberg	Williams-Cosworth	1:25.866	1:25.748		15
16	23	(Japan) Kamui Kobayashi	BMW Sauber-Ferrari	1:26.251	1:25.777		16
17	17	(Spain) Jaime Alguersuari	Toro Rosso-Ferrari	1:26.095	1:26.089		17
18	12	(Russia) Vitaly Petrov	Renault	1:26.471			18
19	19	(Finland) Heikki Kovalainen	Lotus-Cosworth	1:28.797			19
20	18	(Italy) Jarno Trulli	Lotus-Cosworth	1:29.111			20
21	24	(Germany) Timo Glock	Virgin-Cosworth	1:29.592			21
22	25	(Brazil) Lucas di Grassi	Virgin-Cosworth	1:30.185			22
23	21	(Brazil) Bruno Senna	HRT-Cosworth	1:30.526			23
24	20	(India) Karun Chandhok	HRT-Cosworth	1:30.613			24

== Race ==
The conditions on the grid were wet before the race; the air temperature ranged between 26 and 29 °C (79 and 84 °F) and the track temperature ranged from 24 to 28 °C (75 to 82 °F). The race began at 17:00 DST (UTC+11). All cars started on the intermediate compound tyre. Virgin Racing nominated to start Glock and di Grassi from pit lane after replacing the fuel collectors on their cars because issues in qualifying forced them to run with more fuel than would be ideal. Trulli attempted to start the race from the pit lane after his Lotus suffered a hydraulic pump failure on the grid, but the team were unable to rectify the problem and Trulli did not start. When the race started, Vettel maintained his advantage heading into the first corner while Massa made a fast start to slot into second position ahead of Webber. Kubica had an excellent getaway, rising from ninth to fourth position by the end of the first lap. Hamilton made up three positions over the same distance. At the first corner Button's front left wheel made contact with Alonso's right rear tyre, causing the Spanish driver to spin and dropped to 22nd position. Schumacher was collected by Alonso and sustained a broken front wing. Further around the lap, Kobayashi damaged his front wing from contact with another car at turn three, which became detached going into turn six and made heavy contact with the side of Hülkenberg and Buemi. The incident prompted the deployment of the safety car. Schumacher drove into the pit lane to fit a new front wing.

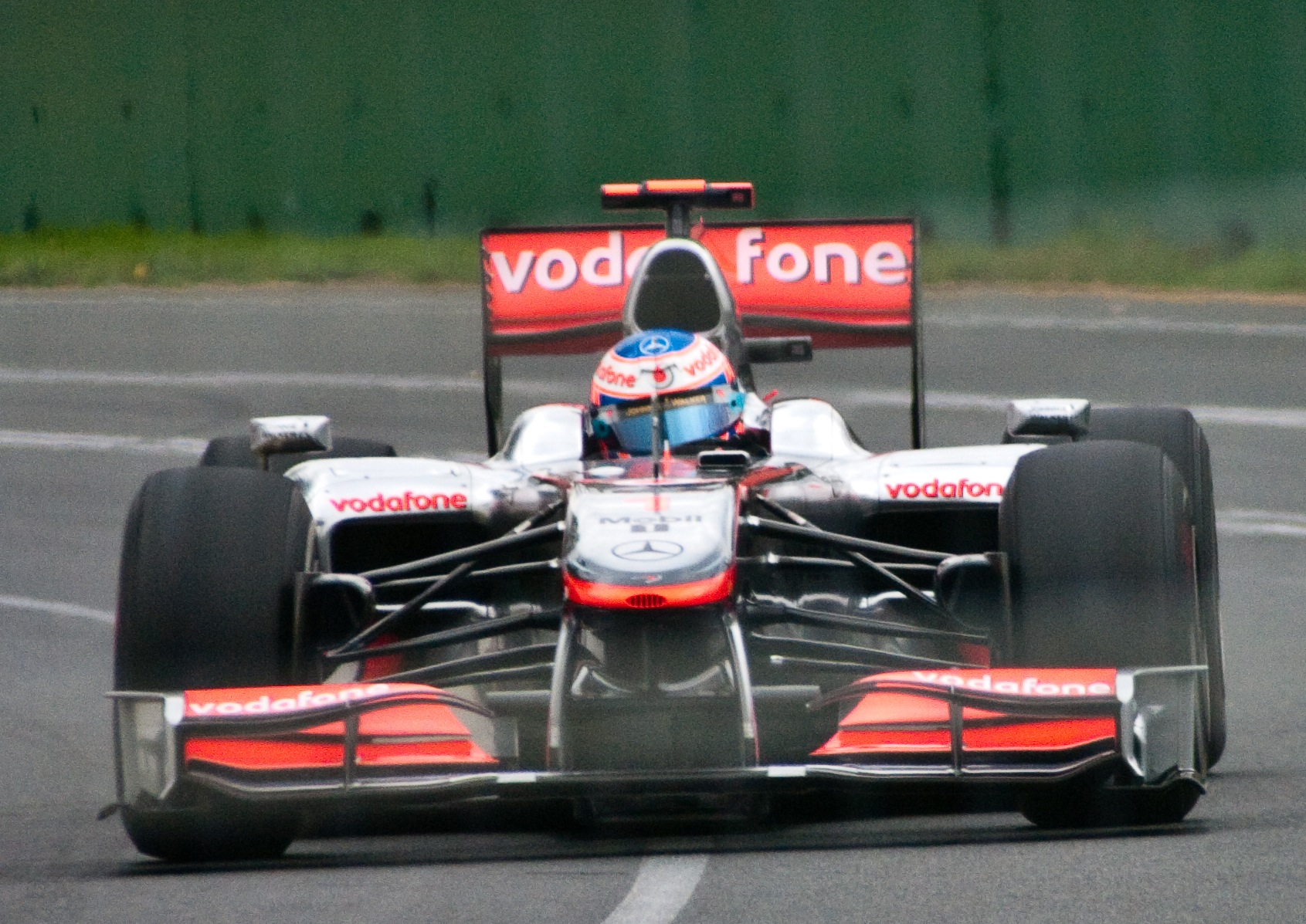
Jenson Button elected to change to slicks early on in the race, eventually going on to clinch the victory.

Racing resumed at the end of lap four when the safety car pulled into the pit-lane with Vettel leading Massa. Kubica attempted to pass Webber but the Australian maintained his position by moving to the outside. Schumacher attempted to pass di Grassi for 19th position on the same lap. di Grassi managed to retake the position from Schumacher by driving around the outside of Ascari corner, but Schumacher got ahead of di Grassi on the pit straight. At the end of the first racing lap, Vettel led Massa by 1.1 seconds, who in turn was followed by Webber, Kubica, Rosberg, Button, Hamilton, Sutil, Barrichello and Petrov. Hamilton passed his teammate Button for sixth at turn three on lap six. Senna stopped on the circuit to retire with a hydraulic failure on the same lap. Massa slowed on the next lap which caused Webber to move into second. Button called his team to bring out slick tyres and endured a large amount of water to enter the pit lane on lap seven. Button slid off the circuit at turn three, while Vettel had a 1.2 second over teammate Webber by the eighth lap. The track started to dry which resulted in most of the field pitting for soft dry tyres. Vettel made a pit stop from the lead on lap nine. Webber took over the lead for one lap before his pit stop on the tenth lap. He went off at the first corner, and fell behind Massa. Petrov missed the braking point for Whiteford corner on lap ten and spun off into the gravel trap which caused his car to become beached and retired. Sutil briefly took over the lead until he made a pit stop on lap twelve and got out of his car to retire because he lost power in his engine.

Thus, Vettel regained the first position as he began to slowly pull away from Button who was 1.7 seconds behind Vettel on lap 13 with Kubica a further two seconds adrift in third. Alonso had moved into tenth position by lap 13 and gained a further after he overtook de la Rosa at turn nine on the same lap. Alonso passed Barrichello for eighth on the 14th lap and set a new fastest lap on the following lap, a 1:31.573. Hamilton and Webber passed Alonso for fifth and sixth positions at the start of lap 16. Webber attempted to defend fifth place from Hamilton but went wide into the gravel trap at turn three and fell down to eighth. Massa immediately overtook Hamilton around the outside on the same lap. Hamilton started to battle Massa (who had graining on his right-rear tyre) for fifth position with Webber and Alonso starting to close the gap to the two drivers. Massa slid his car at turn 16 at the end of lap 21 which allowed Hamilton to pass Massa on the inside at Brabham corner although Hamilton sustained minor damage to his front wing. Hamilton defended Massa's attempt to pass him at Whiteford corner, while Alonso slowed which allowed Webber to pass him. Hamilton overtook Rosberg on the outside of turn eleven. Vettel had sparks coming from his left-front wheel and a large amount of vibrations built up in his car. This caused Vettel to lose torque drive between the front left axle and wheel, and spun into the gravel trap at Ascari corner on lap 26. Vettel's retirement promoted Button into the lead. Rosberg attempted to retake fourth from Hamilton at Ascari corner but was unable to because of the presence of yellow-flags. Webber passed Massa for fifth position at Whiteford corner two laps later. di Grassi drove to his garage to retire with an issue with his car's hydraulics on lap 29.

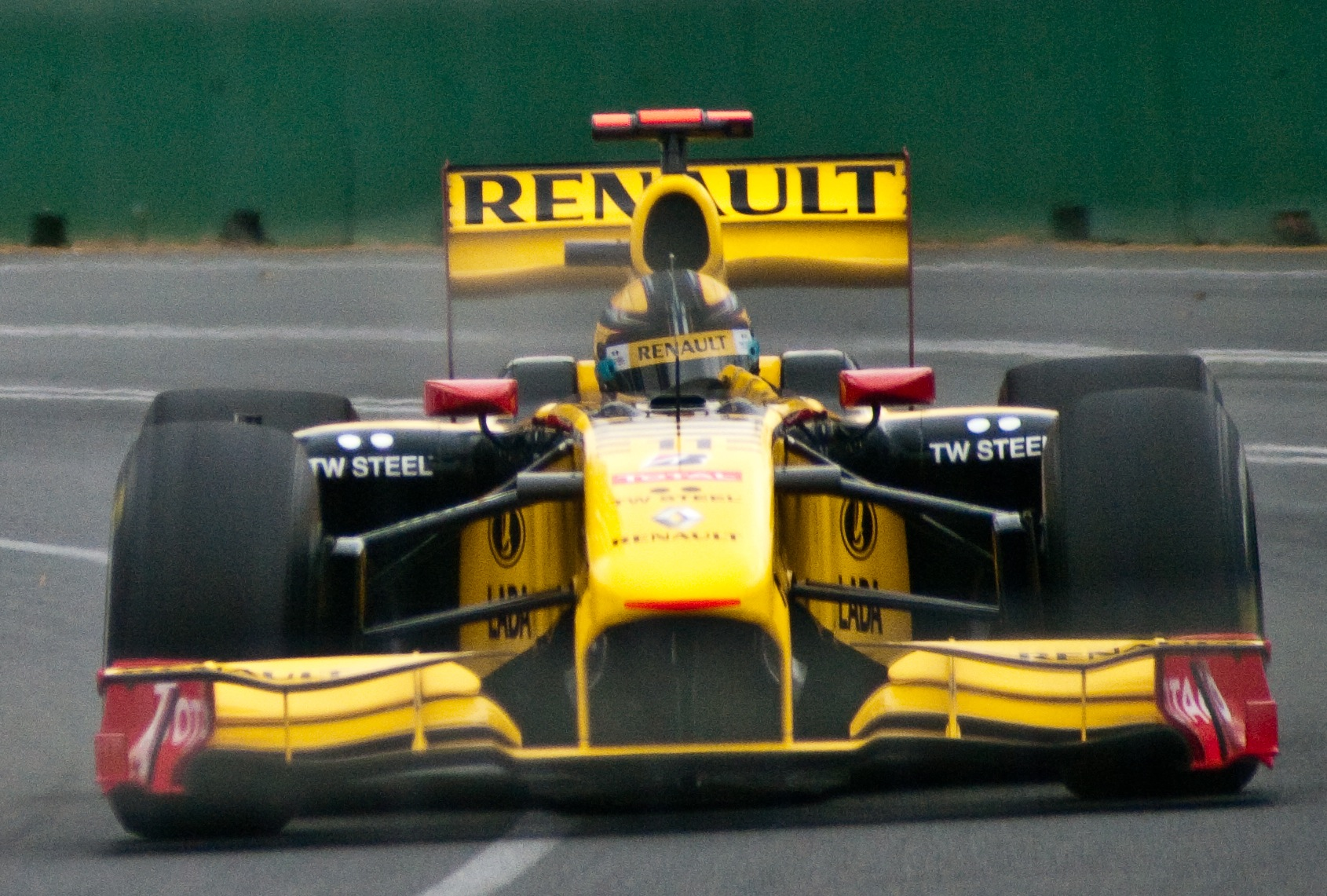
Robert Kubica finished second for the Renault team.

Hamilton closed up on Kubica by the same lap; Hamilton attempted to overtake Kubica while in traffic but Kubica fended off Hamilton's attempt. Hamilton feigned passing manoeuvres at the Brabham and Whiteford corners with the latter attempt resulting in Hamilton losing time to Kubica and fell back in front of Rosberg. Webber made a pit stop for soft compound tyres on lap 33, while Hamilton tried another pass on Kubica on the back straight but Kubica closed the door on Hamilton. Rosberg made his pit stop for tyres one lap later and came out level with Webber as Rosberg exited the pit lane, but Webber's extra momentum allowed him to move ahead of Rosberg. Despite going fastest overall in the first and second sectors of the track after making a pit stop on lap 35, Hamilton went wide at Ascari corner on lap 37 which allowed Webber to briefly move ahead of Hamilton before the McLaren driver regained the position. Hamilton and Webber began to close on Alonso at the rate of two seconds a lap after setting a new fastest lap of the race, a 1:28.591 on lap 40 while Massa started to close the gap to Kubica. di Grassi rejoined the race on lap 39 but returned to the pit lane two laps later. Glock made a pit stop and his mechanics retired him from the race on the 45th lap because a camber shim on his car was loose and it caused the left rear suspension to move around. Hamilton caught Alonso on lap 49 but was unable to pass the Ferrari driver because Hamilton struggled with tyre degradation. Schumacher dived up the inside to attempt an overtake Alguersuari for eleventh place at Ascari corner on lap 56 and the two drivers wheels made contact before Schumacher got ahead at the Stewart corner.

Hamilton attempted to pass Alonso around the outside at Ascari corner on the same lap but Alonso closed the door on Hamilton. Webber took advantage but missed his braking point because his front wing stopped producing downforce which prevented him from reducing his speed and locked his tyres. He collided one of Hamilton's rear tyres, sending both drivers into the gravel trap. Both drivers managed to continue and Webber drove into the pit lane to replace his front wing. Button had maintained his lead upfront and crossed the start/finish line after 58 laps to win his first race of the 2010 season and his second consecutive Australian Grand Prix. Kubica finished second 12 seconds behind Button, with Massa in third. Alonso held off Rosberg in the final laps to finish fourth. Hamilton recovered to finish in sixth, Liuzzi took seventh with Barrichello close behind in eighth, Webber finished ninth and Schumacher passed de la Rosa on the final lap at Whiteford corner for tenth, the final points scoring position. de la Rosa fell behind fellow Spaniard Alguersuari to finish in twelfth with Kovalainen and Chandhok the last of the classified finishers. The organisers of the race invited actor John Travolta to wave the chequered flag.

=== Post-race ===
The top three drivers appeared on the podium to collect their trophies and in a later press conference. Button said it was "very special" that he won in his second race for the McLaren team as it taken him time to get used to his car. He felt that his confidence was increasing and hoped something similar would occur in the following race of the year. Kubica said that he had not been expecting to finish on the podium and thanked the effort of his Renault team for helping him achieving his second-place result. He also said that his team were not with the pace of the top three teams but felt the race was "a good example of not giving up". Massa's third-place finish was his best at the Melbourne Grand Prix and said it was fantastic that he had secured one second and third place podium finishes in the season's first two events. He praised his team for selecting a strategy of not making a pit stop after 20 laps of the race had been completed and felt it was good for all of the top three finishers.

Hamilton was disappointed not to have finished in a higher position and accused Webber of "not thinking" following the collision between the two drivers on the 57th lap. Although Webber apologised to Hamilton he was issued with a reprimand by the stewards. He said that he wanted to achieve a podium finish but that it was a "tough day" for the Red Bull team and had been determined to not give up. Vettel believed he could have won the race had he not been affected by a car failure saying that Red Bull were pushing and trying to do the best they could and wanted to ensure that he clinched victory in the Malaysian Grand Prix. Alonso declared himself to be very happy with his fourth-place result despite being involved in the first lap collision. He said that he was not thinking about Massa at the time but scoring points but claimed he had the perfect car to win the race.

The result meant Alonso remained the leader of the Drivers' Championship with 37 points with his teammate Massa reducing the deficit to four points. Button's victory meant he moved into third place with 31 points and Hamilton fell down to fourth. Rosberg remained in fifth position on 20 points. In the Constructors' Championship Ferrari remained the leader although McLaren cut their lead to be 16 points behind. Kubica's second place allowed Renault to tie Red Bull for fourth place with 18 points each, with seventeen races remaining in the season.

=== Race classification ===
Drivers who scored championship points are denoted in bold.

Pos	No	Driver	Constructor	Laps	Time/Retired	Grid	Points
1	1	**(United Kingdom) Jenson Button**	**McLaren-Mercedes**	58	1:33:36.531	4	25
2	11	**(Poland) Robert Kubica**	**Renault**	58	+12.034	9	18
3	7	**(Brazil) Felipe Massa**	**Ferrari**	58	+14.488	5	15
4	8	**(Spain) Fernando Alonso**	**Ferrari**	58	+16.304	3	12
5	4	**(Germany) Nico Rosberg**	**Mercedes**	58	+16.683	6	10
6	2	**(United Kingdom) Lewis Hamilton**	**McLaren-Mercedes**	58	+29.898	11	8
7	15	**(Italy) Vitantonio Liuzzi**	**Force India-Mercedes**	58	+59.847	13	6
8	9	**(Brazil) Rubens Barrichello**	**Williams-Cosworth**	58	+1:00.536	8	4
9	6	**(Australia) Mark Webber**	**Red Bull-Renault**	58	+1:07.319	2	2
10	3	**(Germany) Michael Schumacher**	**Mercedes**	58	+1:09.391	7	1
11	17	(Spain) Jaime Alguersuari	Toro Rosso-Ferrari	58	+1:11.301	17	
12	22	(Spain) Pedro de la Rosa	BMW Sauber-Ferrari	58	+1:14.084	14	
13	19	(Finland) Heikki Kovalainen	Lotus-Cosworth	56	+2 Laps	19	
14	20	(India) Karun Chandhok	HRT-Cosworth	53	+5 Laps	22	
Ret	24	(Germany) Timo Glock	Virgin-Cosworth	41	Suspension	PL^{2}	
Ret	25	(Brazil) Lucas di Grassi	Virgin-Cosworth	26	Hydraulics	PL^{2}	
Ret	5	(Germany) Sebastian Vettel	Red Bull-Renault	25	Brakes	1	
Ret	14	(Germany) Adrian Sutil	Force India-Mercedes	9	Engine	10	
Ret	12	(Russia) Vitaly Petrov	Renault	9	Spun off	18	
Ret	21	(Brazil) Bruno Senna	HRT-Cosworth	4	Hydraulics	21	
Ret	16	(Switzerland) Sébastien Buemi	Toro Rosso-Ferrari	0	Collision	12	
Ret	10	(Germany) Nico Hülkenberg	Williams-Cosworth	0	Collision	15	
Ret	23	(Japan) Kamui Kobayashi	BMW Sauber-Ferrari	0	Collision	16	
DNS	18	(Italy) Jarno Trulli	Lotus-Cosworth	0	Hydraulics	PL^{1}	

Notes:

- **^1** – Jarno Trulli attempted to start the race from the pit lane after his Lotus suffered a hydraulic fault on the grid, but the team were unable to rectify the problem and Trulli did not start.
- **^2** – Virgin Racing nominated to start their drivers from pit lane after replacing the fuel collectors on their cars after issues in qualifying forced them to run with more fuel than would be ideal.

== Championship standings after the race ==
Drivers' Championship standings

	Pos.	Driver	Points
	1	(Spain) Fernando Alonso	37
	2	(Brazil) Felipe Massa	33
4	3	(United Kingdom) Jenson Button	31
1	4	(United Kingdom) Lewis Hamilton	23
	5	(Germany) Nico Rosberg	20

Constructors' Championship standings

	Pos.	Constructor	Points
	1	(Italy) Ferrari	70
	2	(United Kingdom) McLaren-Mercedes	54
	3	(Germany) Mercedes	29
3	4	(France) Renault	18
1	5	(Austria) Red Bull-Renault	18

- Note: Only the top five positions are included for both sets of standings.

== See also ==
- 2010 BRC IMPCO V8 Supercars GP Challenge

Previous race: 2010 Bahrain Grand Prix	FIA Formula One World Championship; 2010 season	Next race: 2010 Malaysian Grand Prix
Previous race: 2009 Australian Grand Prix	Australian Grand Prix	Next race: 2011 Australian Grand Prix
