= 2018 Australian Grand Prix =

Race 1 of 21 in the 2018 Formula One World Championship
Next race →
- Layout of the Melbourne Grand Prix Circuit

Race details
- Date: 25 March 2018
- Official name: Formula 1 2018 Rolex Australian Grand Prix
- Location: Melbourne Grand Prix Circuit, Melbourne, Australia
- Course: Temporary street circuit
- Course length: 5.303 km (3.295 miles)
- Distance: 58 laps, 307.574 km (191.118 miles)
- Weather: Sunny

Pole position
Driver	(United Kingdom) Lewis Hamilton	Mercedes
- Time: 1:21.164

Fastest lap
Driver	(Australia) Daniel Ricciardo	Red Bull Racing-TAG Heuer
- Time: 1:25.945 on lap 54

Podium
First	(Germany) Sebastian Vettel	Ferrari
Second	(United Kingdom) Lewis Hamilton	Mercedes
Third	(Finland) Kimi Räikkönen	Ferrari

The 2018 Australian Grand Prix (officially known as the Formula 1 2018 Rolex Australian Grand Prix) was a Formula One motor race held on 25 March 2018 in Melbourne, Victoria. The race was contested at the Melbourne Grand Prix Circuit and was the first round of the 2018 FIA Formula One World Championship. The race marked the 83rd race in the combined history of the Australian Grand Prix – which dates back to the 100 Miles Road Race of 1928 – and the 23rd time the event was held at the Albert Park circuit.

Ferrari driver Sebastian Vettel was the defending race winner. Mercedes driver Lewis Hamilton started the race from pole – his seventh pole position in Australia, a record for the event – while Vettel successfully defended his race win, the 48th of his career, and stood on the podium for the 100th time. Hamilton finished the race in second place and Kimi Räikkönen completed the podium by finishing in third place for Ferrari.

The race marked the official Formula One debuts of future Grand Prix winner Charles Leclerc, who drove for Sauber, and of Sergey Sirotkin, who drove for Williams. It was the first race without a Brazilian driver since the 1982 San Marino Grand Prix. It was also the first race since the official introduction of the halo cockpit safety device.

== Report ==
=== Background ===
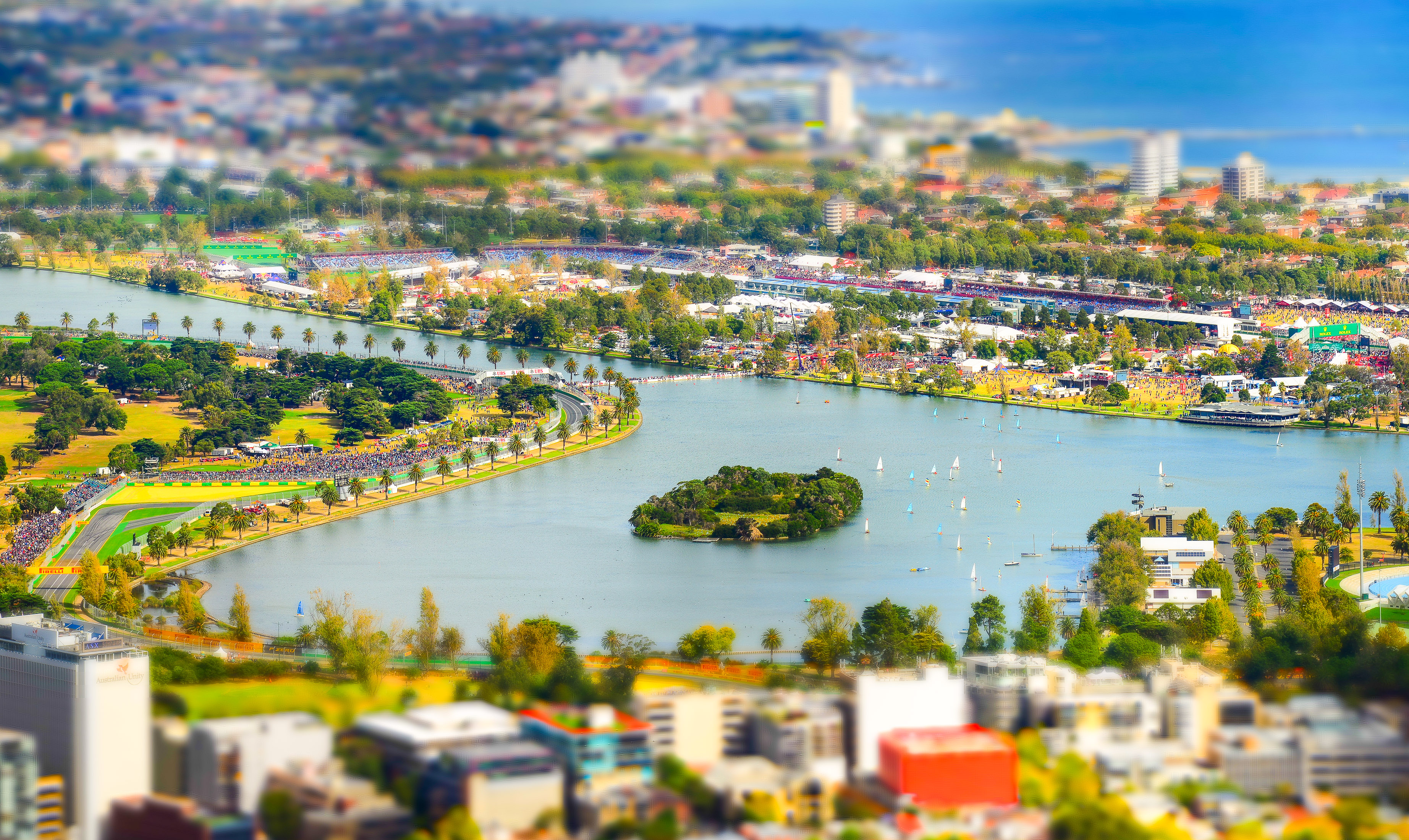
The Melbourne Grand Prix Circuit (pictured in 2014), where the race was held.

The Australian Grand Prix was officially confirmed as the first of 21 races of the 2018 Formula One World Championship in an FIA World Motor Sport Council meeting in Paris in December 2017. It took place at the 15-turn 5.303 km (3.295 mi) Melbourne Grand Prix Circuit in Melbourne, Victoria on 25 March 2018. Tyre supplier Pirelli brought three types of tyre to the Grand Prix: three dry compounds (the purple-banded ultrasoft "option", the red-banded supersoft and the yellow-banded soft "prime" tyres). In the week before the Grand Prix, race officials confirmed the inclusion of a third drag reduction system (DRS) zone. The detection point for the third zone was positioned on the approach to the turns 11 and 12 chicane with the activation point on the exit to turn 12. The existing DRS zones were unchanged from previous years, with one positioned on the main straight and the second on the straight between turns two and three.

The race marked the competitive début of the "halo" cockpit protection device after 18 months of rigorous testing. The wishbone-shaped frame mounted above and around the driver's head was developed following a series of major accidents in open wheel racing, such as the death of Henry Surtees in a Formula Two race at Brands Hatch in 2009 and Felipe Massa sustaining a head injury from being struck in the helmet by a detached coil spring from Rubens Barrichello's car at the Hungaroring six days later. In response to concerns about the halo impairing drivers' visibility, the world governing body of motorsport, the Fédération Internationale de l'Automobile (FIA), lowered the starting gantries at circuits to improve the starting lights visibility. Furthermore, drivers were permitted to execute practice standing starts after the conclusion of both Friday practice sessions to acquaint themselves with the lowered gantries.

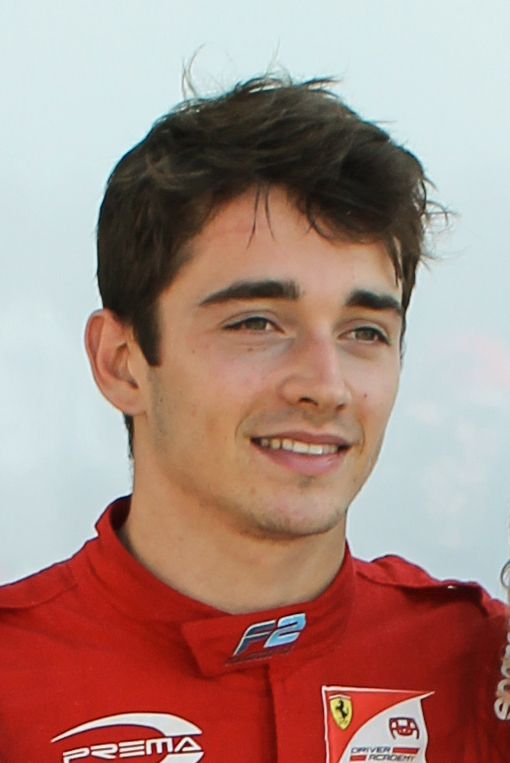
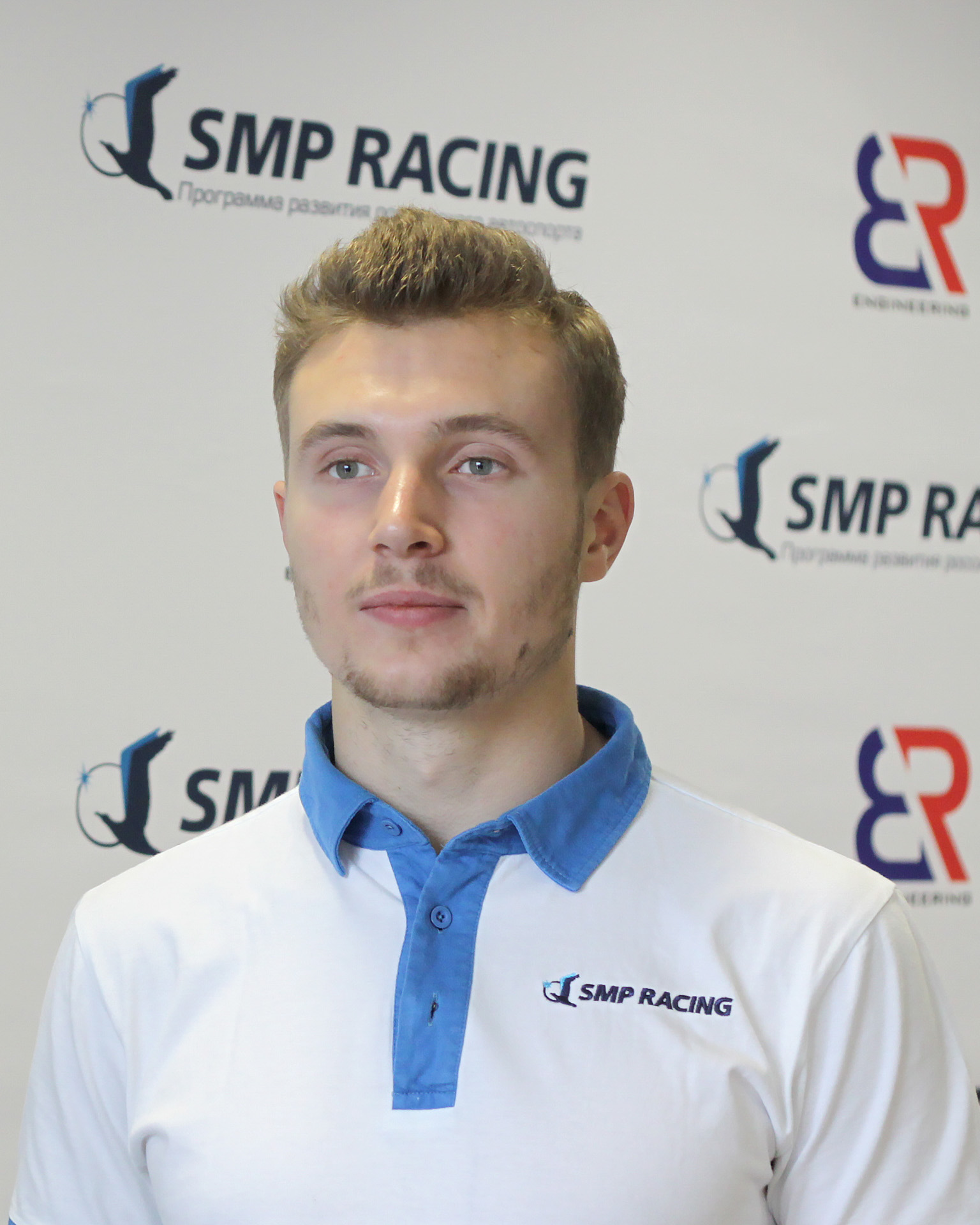
Charles Leclerc (left) and Sergey Sirotkin (right) made their Formula One debuts with Sauber and Williams respectively.

Out of the 10 teams and 20 drivers on the starting grid, two drivers made their debut. Charles Leclerc, the reigning Formula 2 champion and 2016 GP3 Series title winner, made his competitive début with Sauber. Leclerc, who had previously driven in Friday practice sessions in 2016 and 2017, was hired by the team to replace Pascal Wehrlein, who could not find a race seat and was instead enlisted as one of Mercedes's test and reserve drivers while racing full-time in the Deutsche Tourenwagen Masters series. Massa retired from Formula One at the conclusion of the 2017 championship, and was replaced at Williams by former Renault test driver and SMP Racing driver Sergey Sirotkin, who made his competitive début with the team. Elsewhere, Toro Rosso employed 2016 GP2 Series champion Pierre Gasly and two-time World Endurance co-champion Brendon Hartley as their full-time drivers for 2018 after the pair debuted with the squad in the latter stages of the 2017 championship.

At the front of the field, Lewis Hamilton and Sebastian Vettel in the Mercedes and Ferrari cars respectively were the favourites to battle for the Drivers' Championship, with both drivers having the opportunity to equal Juan Manuel Fangio in number of championships with five. Hamilton said he had not mulled about the prospects of equalling Fangio during the winter hiatus but the potential of doing so excited him, "In my mind I want to break barriers, push the envelope and see how far I can take the ability I have and reach my full potential. I don’t know what that is, so that’s what I’m discovering. I hope that I haven’t reached my peak yet. I’m sure there is one, when your fitness level is harder to reach or your interest or drive starts to decline, but I’m definitely not there. I’m in a good range right now and aim to continue to extract the most that I can." However, Vettel stated he was unconcerned with it as he anticipated the events of the upcoming season and not those in the far future, "That’s a long way ahead, and we all know how many things need to come together to fight for the championship to the end of the season, and to win it. Times are also very different to when Fangio achieved his five titles, and every era has its different challenges. So it’s not in my mind now, let’s say."

=== Practice ===
Per the regulations for the 2018 season, three practice sessions were held, two 90-minute sessions on Friday and another 60-minute session before qualifying on Saturday. The first practice session took place in sunny weather conditions. On the supersoft compound tyres, Hamilton set the fastest time in the opening practice session with a 1-minute and 24.026 seconds lap, followed by his teammate Valtteri Bottas who was 0.551 seconds slower in second place and Max Verstappen of Red Bull was third. The Ferrari duo of Kimi Räikkönen and Vettel were fourth and fifth with Daniel Ricciardo sixth in the second Red Bull car. Haas' Romain Grosjean, Fernando Alonso of McLaren (who remained in the garage for first practice's first hour with an exhaust problem), Carlos Sainz Jr. for Renault and Alonso's teammate Stoffel Vandoorne (who had driveability issues) rounded out the session's top ten drivers. Though the session passed without any major incidents, Vettel and Haas driver Kevin Magnussen both ran into the grass beside the track surface.

In the second practice session, Verstappen was the early pace setter after ten minutes and held the top position until Bottas beat his time. Hamilton went to the top of the time sheets soon after until Räikkönen moved ahead of him 35 minutes into the session. Hamilton later switched onto the ultrasoft compound tyres and then recorded the fastest lap of the day with a time of 1 minute and 23.931 seconds, which was not bettered for the remainder of practice as drivers conducted qualifying simulations and then driving on track for a long period of time. Verstappen, Bottas, Räikkönen, Vettel, Grosjean, Ricciardo, Alonso, Magnussen and Vandoorne followed in positions two through ten. Early in the session, Esteban Ocon lost control of his Force India and ran into the turn three gravel trap but he rejoined without trouble. Räikkönen was slow in turn three as Bottas approached him. He steered to the middle and Bottas swerved to the outside under braking due to a miscommunication that sent him into the gravel trap. The session was stopped for five minutes when a timing cable wire detached and fell onto the start/finish straight and was picked up by track marshals quickly.

After the second practice session, Ricciardo incurred a three-place grid penalty and two super licence penalty points from the stewards for not staying above the minimum time as established in the FIA's electronic control unit under red flag conditions. They also concluded that Räikkönen had not "unnecessarily impeded" Bottas and was not penalised. Thunderstorms on Saturday morning saturated the track and made it slippery to drive on. Wet-weather tyres were used for the majority of the session before it dried sufficiently enough to warrant the use of dry tyre compounds. Vettel set the fastest lap at 1 minute and 26.067 seconds with his teammate Räikkönen in second. Sauber's Marcus Ericsson was third, ahead of Verstappen, Sainz and Ricciardo. The Mercedes of Bottas and Hamilton along with the McLarens of Vandoorne and Alonso completed the top ten ahead of qualifying. During the session, in which Verstappen and Nico Hülkenberg of Renault slithered exiting turn ten, the steering wheel on Hamilton's car was replaced in the pit lane when it developed a technical fault, and owing to a lack of spare car parts, Force India chose not to set any timed laps during the one-hour period.

=== Qualifying ===
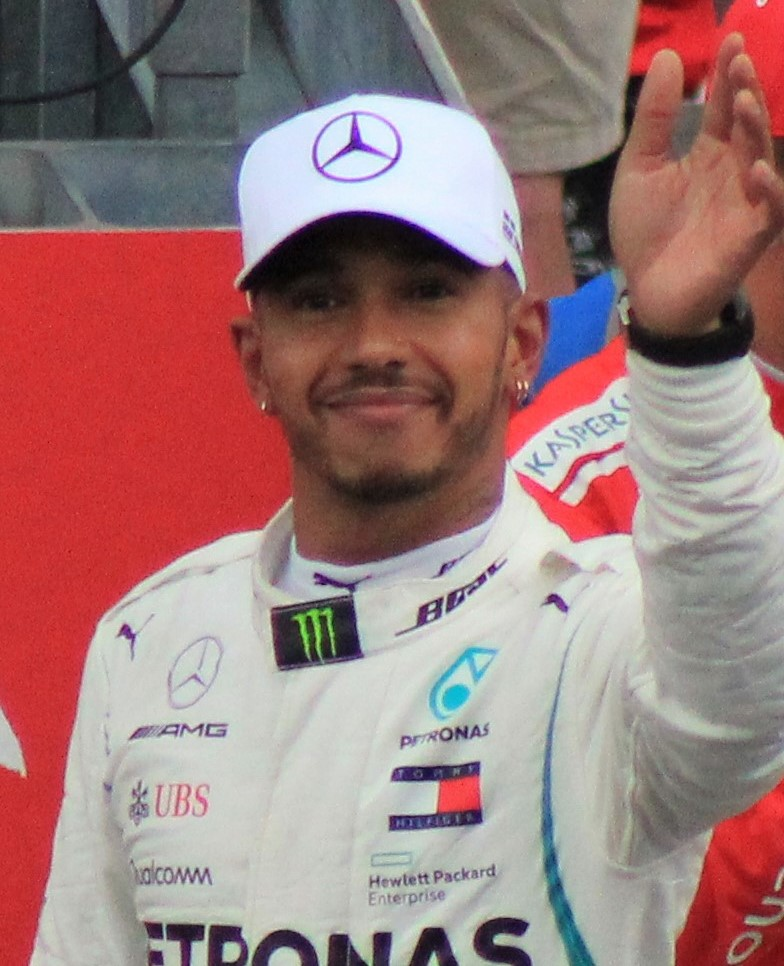
Lewis Hamilton had the 73rd pole position of his career

Saturday afternoon's qualifying session was divided into three parts. The first part ran for 18 minutes, eliminating cars that finished 16th or below. The 107% rule was in effect during this part, requiring drivers to set a time within 107% of the fastest lap in order to qualify. The second part lasted 15 minutes, eliminating cars that finished 11th to 15th, before the third and final part that ran for 12 minutes and determined pole position to tenth. In the first part of qualifying (Q1), track conditions improved greatly as drivers settled into undertaking long-distance runs to acquaint themselves with the evolving conditions. Hamilton led the session with a lap of 1 minute and 22.824 seconds that he recorded on his second attempt, ahead of the Ferrari duo of Räikkönen and Vettel. The Red Bulls of Verstappen and Ricciardo were fourth and fifth. The five drivers who were eliminated from qualifying in Q1 were Hartley, the Saubers of Ericsson and Leclerc, Sirotkin, and Gasly after he made a driving error and ran into the turn three gravel trap after he locked his tyres.

To commence the second qualifying session (Q2), Red Bull elected to send their drivers out on the supersoft compound tyres rather than the ultrasoft compound tyres and this determined which type of tyre the team would start the race on. Räikkönen was the early pace setter after all competitors set their first timed laps but it was Hamilton who improved his effort and lowered his own pole position lap time from the previous year. But it was Vettel in the second Ferrari who was the first driver to set a lap time below the 1 minute and 22 seconds mark all weekend with a 1-minute and 21.944 seconds effort. Alonso and Vandoorne in the two McLarens were eliminated from contending for pole position when both Haas and Renault drivers bettered their personal best laps despite the latter team's drivers locking their tyres. Sergio Pérez for Force India, Williams' Lance Stroll (who went off the track at the third corner) and Ocon were the final three drivers not to progress into the final qualifying session (Q3).

As he began his first timed lap in Q3, Bottas took too much kerb on the exit to the first turn, which was damp from the earlier rain, causing him to run wide, and he spun from having excessive wheelspin into the right-hand side barrier at turn two, and crashed heavily in an impact measured at 27 g. His car spun ending up in the middle of the track with debris littered across it. The session was temporarily stopped to repair the barriers and clean up the debris. When Q3 restarted, Hamilton paced the field but his first lap was slower than in Q2, possibly because of fluid deposited by his teammate Bottas between turns one and two. He then improved his lap to a circuit-record 1 minute and 21.164 seconds to clinch pole position. It was his fifth consecutive pole position at the track, his seventh overall in Melbourne to move past Ayrton Senna in the number of pole positions in Australia, and the 73rd of his career. He was joined on the grid's front row by Räikkönen who recorded a lap 0.664 seconds slower and his teammate Vettel was third after a driving error at turn 13. Verstappen qualified in the fourth position.

=== Post-qualifying ===
Following his crash that brought Q3 to a stop, Bottas was transported to the circuit's medical centre for a precautionary check-up and he was declared fit to race. However, he was handed a five-place grid penalty because Mercedes discovered his car's gearbox was damaged in the crash. The grid lined up after penalties as Hamilton, Räikkönen, Vettel, Verstappen, Magnussen, Grosjean, Hülkenberg, Ricciardo, Sainz, Alonso, Vandoorne, Pérez, Stroll, Ocon, Bottas, Hartley, Ericsson, Leclerc, Sirotkin and Gasly.

=== Race ===
Before the race, a tribute was paid to the late former Australian Grand Prix promoter Ron Walker by officially naming the Albert Park circuit's main straight the Walker Straight.

After the start the top three stayed in the same order they started while Verstappen lost a place to Magnussen at the start. Sergey Sirotkin was the first retirement of the race when he retired on lap 4 due to a brake failure caused by overheating. On lap 9, Verstappen spun at turn 1 while chasing Magnussen and dropped down to eighth. Hamilton led Räikkönen, Vettel, Magnussen, Grosjean, Ricciardo, Hülkenberg, Verstappen, Sainz and Alonso. They stayed in that order until the first round of pit stops. On lap 18 Räikkönen pitted for softs. On lap 19 Hamilton pitted for softs to cover Räikkönen and emerged on track ahead of him. Verstappen pitted on lap 20. Magnussen pitted at the end of lap 21, but retired the next lap due to a cross-threaded wheel-nut being fitted loosely.

On lap 24, Grosjean retired at turn 2 from seventh after pitting with the same problem as his teammate Magnussen, resulting in a Virtual Safety Car (VSC) being called out. On lap 26 Vettel pitted under the VSC and emerged ahead of Hamilton and Räikkönen. Prior to Vettel's pit stop, Mercedes had miscalculated the required gap between Vettel and Hamilton to prevent a change of the running order under the safety car due to a software glitch. After the first round of pit stops Vettel led with Hamilton second and Räikkönen in third. Alonso pitted under the VSC to emerge ahead of Verstappen. On lap 27 the full-course Safety Car was called out. The safety car came in at the end of lap 31. This left the top ten Vettel, Hamilton, Räikkönen, Ricciardo, Alonso, Verstappen, Hülkenberg, Bottas, Vandoorne and Sainz. None of the top ten pitted again.

Ricciardo hounded Räikkönen for the rest of the race, setting the fastest lap in the process. Alonso resisted the pressure from Verstappen while holding on to fifth place. Vettel took the chequered flag to win the Australian Grand Prix for the second consecutive year, followed by Hamilton and Räikkönen rounding the podium. Ricciardo, Alonso, Verstappen, Hülkenberg, Bottas, Vandoorne and Sainz in that order completed the top ten, with Renault scoring their first double-points-finish since the 2011 Turkish Grand Prix. Ricciardo's 4th-placed finish marked his joint best finish at Albert Park, but also the joint best finish for an Australian at the Australian Grand Prix, equalling his 2016 result, and Mark Webber's 4th place in 2012.

After the race, Haas was fined €10,000 by the FIA for sending both of its drivers back to the track without tyres being properly attached to the cars.

== Classification ==
=== Qualifying ===
Pos.	Car no.	Driver	Constructor	Qualifying times			Final grid
Pos.	Car no.	Driver	Constructor	Q1	Q2	Q3	Final grid
1	44	(United Kingdom) Lewis Hamilton	Mercedes	1:22.824	1:22.051	1:21.164	1
2	7	(Finland) Kimi Räikkönen	Ferrari	1:23.096	1:22.507	1:21.828	2
3	5	(Germany) Sebastian Vettel	Ferrari	1:23.348	1:21.944	1:21.838	3
4	33	(Netherlands) Max Verstappen	Red Bull Racing-TAG Heuer	1:23.483	1:22.416	1:21.879	4
5	3	(Australia) Daniel Ricciardo	Red Bull Racing-TAG Heuer	1:23.494	1:22.897	1:22.152	8^{a}
6	20	(Denmark) Kevin Magnussen	Haas-Ferrari	1:23.909	1:23.300	1:23.187	5
7	8	(France) Romain Grosjean	Haas-Ferrari	1:23.671	1:23.468	1:23.339	6
8	27	(Germany) Nico Hülkenberg	Renault	1:23.782	1:23.544	1:23.532	7
9	55	(Spain) Carlos Sainz Jr.	Renault	1:23.529	1:23.061	1:23.577	9
10	77	(Finland) Valtteri Bottas	Mercedes	1:23.686	1:22.089	No time	15^{b}
11	14	(Spain) Fernando Alonso	McLaren-Renault	1:23.597	1:23.692	N/A	10
12	2	(Belgium) Stoffel Vandoorne	McLaren-Renault	1:24.073	1:23.853	N/A	11
13	11	(Mexico) Sergio Pérez	Force India-Mercedes	1:24.344	1:24.005	N/A	12
14	18	(Canada) Lance Stroll	Williams-Mercedes	1:24.464	1:24.230	N/A	13
15	31	(France) Esteban Ocon	Force India-Mercedes	1:24.503	1:24.786	N/A	14
16	28	(New Zealand) Brendon Hartley	Scuderia Toro Rosso-Honda	1:24.532	N/A	N/A	16
17	9	(Sweden) Marcus Ericsson	Sauber-Ferrari	1:24.556	N/A	N/A	17
18	16	(Monaco) Charles Leclerc	Sauber-Ferrari	1:24.636	N/A	N/A	18
19	35	(Russia) Sergey Sirotkin	Williams-Mercedes	1:24.922	N/A	N/A	19
20	10	(France) Pierre Gasly	Scuderia Toro Rosso-Honda	1:25.295	N/A	N/A	20
107% time: 1:28.621

Notes

- ^a – Daniel Ricciardo received a three-place grid penalty for failing to adequately slow down for a red flag during free practice.
- ^b – Valtteri Bottas received a five-place grid penalty for a gearbox change.

=== Race ===
Pos.	No.	Driver	Constructor	Laps	Time/Retired	Grid	Points
1	5	(Germany) Sebastian Vettel	Ferrari	58	1:29:33.283	3	25
2	44	(United Kingdom) Lewis Hamilton	Mercedes	58	+5.036	1	18
3	7	(Finland) Kimi Räikkönen	Ferrari	58	+6.309	2	15
4	3	(Australia) Daniel Ricciardo	Red Bull Racing-TAG Heuer	58	+7.069	8	12
5	14	(Spain) Fernando Alonso	McLaren-Renault	58	+27.886	10	10
6	33	(Netherlands) Max Verstappen	Red Bull Racing-TAG Heuer	58	+28.945	4	8
7	27	(Germany) Nico Hülkenberg	Renault	58	+32.671	7	6
8	77	(Finland) Valtteri Bottas	Mercedes	58	+34.339	15	4
9	2	(Belgium) Stoffel Vandoorne	McLaren-Renault	58	+34.921	11	2
10	55	(Spain) Carlos Sainz Jr.	Renault	58	+45.722	9	1
11	11	(Mexico) Sergio Pérez	Force India-Mercedes	58	+46.817	12	
12	31	(France) Esteban Ocon	Force India-Mercedes	58	+1:00.278	14	
13	16	(Monaco) Charles Leclerc	Sauber-Ferrari	58	+1:15.759	18	
14	18	(Canada) Lance Stroll	Williams-Mercedes	58	+1:18.288	13	
15	28	(New Zealand) Brendon Hartley	Scuderia Toro Rosso-Honda	57	+1 lap	16	
Ret	8	(France) Romain Grosjean	Haas-Ferrari	24	Loose wheel	6	
Ret	20	(Denmark) Kevin Magnussen	Haas-Ferrari	22	Loose wheel	5	
Ret	10	(France) Pierre Gasly	Scuderia Toro Rosso-Honda	13	Engine	20	
Ret	9	(Sweden) Marcus Ericsson	Sauber-Ferrari	5	Hydraulics	17	
Ret	35	(Russia) Sergey Sirotkin	Williams-Mercedes	4	Brakes	19	

== Championship standings after the race ==
Drivers' Championship standings

Pos.	Driver	Points
1	(Germany) Sebastian Vettel	25
2	(United Kingdom) Lewis Hamilton	18
3	(Finland) Kimi Räikkönen	15
4	(Australia) Daniel Ricciardo	12
5	(Spain) Fernando Alonso	10

Constructors' Championship standings

Pos.	Constructor	Points
1	(Italy) Ferrari	40
2	(Germany) Mercedes	22
3	(Austria) Red Bull Racing-TAG Heuer	20
4	(United Kingdom) McLaren-Renault	12
5	(France) Renault	7

- Note: Only the top five positions are included for both sets of standings.

== See also ==
- 2018 Melbourne 400

Previous race: 2017 Abu Dhabi Grand Prix	FIA Formula One World Championship; 2018 season	Next race: 2018 Bahrain Grand Prix
Previous race: 2017 Australian Grand Prix	Australian Grand Prix	Next race: 2019 Australian Grand Prix
