= 2010 BRC IMPCO V8 Supercars GP Challenge =

Car race in 2010

(Victoria (state)) 2010 BRC IMPCO V8 Supercars GP Challenge
Event Information
- Date: 25–28 March 2010
- Location: Melbourne, Victoria
- Venue: Melbourne Grand Prix Circuit
- Weather: Fine

Results
Race 1
| Distance | 13 laps | 70 km |
| Pole position | Garth Tander; Holden Racing Team | 1:57.1666 |
| Winner | James Courtney; Dick Johnson Racing | 25:58.8986 |
Race 2
| Distance | 13 laps | 70 km |
| Winner | Garth Tander; Holden Racing Team | 25:58.1135 |
Race 3
| Distance | 13 laps | 70 km |
| Winner | Garth Tander; Holden Racing Team | 29:11.2684 |
Round Results
| First | Garth Tander; Holden Racing Team | 292 pts |
| Second | Shane van Gisbergen; Stone Brothers Racing | 258 pts |
| Third | Craig Lowndes; Triple Eight Race Engineering | 220 pts |

The 2010 BRC IMPCO V8 Supercars GP Challenge was the fourth meeting of the 2010 V8 Supercar season, however it was a stand-alone event not contributing to the 2010 V8 Supercar Championship Series pointscore. It was held on the weekend of 25 to 28 March at Albert Park Street Circuit, in the inner suburbs of Melbourne, the capital of Victoria. It was the lead support category for the 2010 Australian Grand Prix.

This race meeting was broadcast by Network Ten; the only race the network is permitted to broadcast following its loss of broadcasting rights to the V8 Supercars in 2006.

== Qualifying ==
Qualifying was held on Thursday 25 March.

== Top Ten shootout ==
The top ten shootout was held on Friday 26 March.

== Race 1 ==
Race 1 was held on Friday 26 March.

== Race 2 ==
Race 2 was held on Saturday 27 March.

== Race 3 ==
Race 3 was held on Sunday 28 March.

== Results ==
Results as follows:

=== Qualifying ===
Qualifying timesheets:

| Pos | No | Name | Car | Team | Shootout | Qualifying |
|---|---|---|---|---|---|---|
| Pole | 2 | Garth Tander | Holden Commodore (VE) | Holden Racing Team | 1:57.1666 | 1:57.9965 |
| 2 | 18 | James Courtney | Ford Falcon (FG) | Dick Johnson Racing | 1:57.3429 | 1:58.3377 |
| 3 | 7 | Todd Kelly | Holden Commodore (VE) | Kelly Racing | 1:57.4077 | 1:58.4513 |
| 4 | 15 | Rick Kelly | Holden Commodore (VE) | Kelly Racing | 1:57.6746 | 1:58.3992 |
| 5 | 9 | Shane van Gisbergen | Ford Falcon (FG) | Stone Brothers Racing | 1:57.8137 | 1:58.5116 |
| 6 | 888 | Craig Lowndes | Holden Commodore (VE) | Triple Eight Race Engineering | 1:57.8903 | 1:58.4364 |
| 7 | 1 | Jamie Whincup | Holden Commodore (VE) | Triple Eight Race Engineering | 1:57.9443 | 1:57.9308 |
| 8 | 55 | Paul Dumbrell | Ford Falcon (FG) | Rod Nash Racing | 1:58.5977 | 1:58.4940 |
| 9 | 8 | Jason Richards | Holden Commodore (VE) | Brad Jones Racing | 1:58.8892 | 1:58.4794 |
| 10 | 51 | Greg Murphy | Holden Commodore (VE) | Paul Morris Motorsport | 2:00.8092 | 1:58.2480 |
| 11 | 17 | Steven Johnson | Ford Falcon (FG) | Dick Johnson Racing | | 1:58.6292 |
| 12 | 24 | Fabian Coulthard | Holden Commodore (VE) | Walkinshaw Racing | | 1:58.6548 |
| 13 | 5 | Mark Winterbottom | Ford Falcon (FG) | Ford Performance Racing | | 1:58.6661 |
| 14 | 33 | Lee Holdsworth | Holden Commodore (VE) | Garry Rogers Motorsport | | 1:58.6938 |
| 15 | 22 | Will Davison | Holden Commodore (VE) | Holden Racing Team | | 1:58.7316 |
| 16 | 14 | Jason Bright | Holden Commodore (VE) | Brad Jones Racing | | 1:58.8223 |
| 17 | 47 | Tim Slade | Ford Falcon (FG) | James Rosenberg Racing | | 1:58.8287 |
| 18 | 39 | Russell Ingall | Holden Commodore (VE) | Paul Morris Motorsport | | 1:58.9748 |
| 19 | 4 | Alex Davison | Ford Falcon (FG) | Stone Brothers Racing | | 1:59.0783 |
| 20 | 34 | Michael Caruso | Holden Commodore (VE) | Garry Rogers Motorsport | | 1:59.0893 |
| 21 | 11 | Jason Bargwanna | Holden Commodore (VE) | Kelly Racing | | 1:59.2246 |
| 22 | 19 | Jonathon Webb | Ford Falcon (FG) | Tekno Autosports | | 1:59.3975 |
| 23 | 30 | Daniel Gaunt | Holden Commodore (VE) | Lucas Dumbrell Motorsport | | 1:59.8058 |
| 24 | 3 | Tony D'Alberto | Holden Commodore (VE) | Tony D'Alberto Racing | | 1:59.8223 |
| 25 | 12 | Dean Fiore | Ford Falcon (FG) | Triple F Racing | | 1:59.8907 |
| 26 | 10 | Andrew Thompson | Holden Commodore (VE) | Walkinshaw Racing | | 2:00.1503 |
| 27 | 16 | Tony Ricciardello | Holden Commodore (VE) | Kelly Racing | | 2:00.9122 |
| 28 | 6 | Steven Richards | Ford Falcon (FG) | Ford Performance Racing | | 2:00.9476 |
| 29 | 21 | Karl Reindler | Holden Commodore (VE) | Britek Motorsport | | 2:02.6235 |

=== Race 1 ===
Race timesheets:

| Pos | No | Name | Team | Laps | Time/Retired | Grid | Points |
|---|---|---|---|---|---|---|---|
| 1 | 18 | James Courtney | Dick Johnson Racing | 13 | 0:25:58.8986 | 2 | 100 |
| 2 | 2 | Garth Tander | Holden Racing Team | 13 | +0.260s | 1 | 92 |
| 3 | 9 | Shane van Gisbergen | Stone Brothers Racing | 13 | +0.704s | 5 | 86 |
| 4 | 888 | Craig Lowndes | Triple Eight Race Engineering | 13 | +1.179s | 6 | 80 |
| 5 | 1 | Jamie Whincup | Triple Eight Race Engineering | 13 | +1.724s | 7 | 74 |
| 6 | 7 | Todd Kelly | Kelly Racing | 13 | +12.521s | 3 | 68 |
| 7 | 55 | Paul Dumbrell | Rod Nash Racing | 13 | +14.150s | 8 | 64 |
| 8 | 17 | Steven Johnson | Dick Johnson Racing | 13 | +15.566s | 11 | 60 |
| 9 | 5 | Mark Winterbottom | Ford Performance Racing | 13 | +15.714s | 13 | 56 |
| 10 | 22 | Will Davison | Holden Racing Team | 13 | +18.246s | 15 | 52 |
| 11 | 33 | Lee Holdsworth | Garry Rogers Motorsport | 13 | +18.736s | 14 | 48 |
| 12 | 24 | Fabian Coulthard | Walkinshaw Racing | 13 | +19.853s | 12 | 46 |
| 13 | 8 | Jason Richards | Brad Jones Racing | 13 | +20.364s | 9 | 44 |
| 14 | 4 | Alex Davison | Stone Brothers Racing | 13 | +20.716s | 19 | 42 |
| 15 | 11 | Jason Bargwanna | Kelly Racing | 13 | +24.403s | 21 | 40 |
| 16 | 14 | Jason Bright | Brad Jones Racing | 13 | +24.755s | 16 | 38 |
| 17 | 39 | Russell Ingall | Paul Morris Motorsport | 13 | +25.292s | 18 | 36 |
| 18 | 47 | Tim Slade | James Rosenberg Racing | 13 | +27.507s | 17 | 34 |
| 19 | 19 | Jonathon Webb | Tekno Autosports | 13 | +27.866s | 22 | 32 |
| 20 | 51 | Greg Murphy | Paul Morris Motorsport | 13 | +28.246s | 10 | 30 |
| 21 | 6 | Steven Richards | Ford Performance Racing | 13 | +33.683s | 28 | 28 |
| 22 | 12 | Dean Fiore | Triple F Racing | 13 | +34.359s | 25 | 26 |
| 23 | 34 | Michael Caruso | Garry Rogers Motorsport | 13 | +37.465s | 20 | 24 |
| 24 | 15 | Rick Kelly | Kelly Racing | 13 | +39.978s | 4 | 22 |
| 25 | 3 | Tony D'Alberto | Tony D'Alberto Racing | 13 | +41.118s | 24 | 20 |
| 26 | 30 | Daniel Gaunt | Lucas Dumbrell Motorsport | 13 | +43.744s | 23 | 18 |
| 27 | 21 | Karl Reindler | Britek Motorsport | 13 | +44.755s | 29 | 16 |
| 28 | 10 | Andrew Thompson | Walkinshaw Racing | 13 | +46.067s | 26 | 14 |
| 29 | 16 | Tony Ricciardello | Kelly Racing | 13 | +57.477s | 27 | 12 |

=== Race 2 ===
Race timesheets:

| Pos | No | Name | Team | Laps | Time/Retired | Grid | Points |
|---|---|---|---|---|---|---|---|
| 1 | 2 | Garth Tander | Holden Racing Team | 13 | 0:25:58.1135 | 2 | 100 |
| 2 | 1 | Jamie Whincup | Triple Eight Race Engineering | 13 | +0.377s | 5 | 96 |
| 3 | 18 | James Courtney | Dick Johnson Racing | 13 | +4.346s | 1 | 86 |
| 4 | 9 | Shane van Gisbergen | Stone Brothers Racing | 13 | +5.989s | 3 | 80 |
| 5 | 5 | Mark Winterbottom | Ford Performance Racing | 13 | +6.743s | 9 | 74 |
| 6 | 22 | Will Davison | Holden Racing Team | 13 | +10.514s | 10 | 68 |
| 7 | 17 | Steven Johnson | Dick Johnson Racing | 13 | +10.815s | 8 | 64 |
| 8 | 888 | Craig Lowndes | Triple Eight Race Engineering | 13 | +14.187s | 4 | 60 |
| 9 | 55 | Paul Dumbrell | Rod Nash Racing | 13 | +15.285s | 7 | 56 |
| 10 | 33 | Lee Holdsworth | Garry Rogers Motorsport | 13 | +15.798s | 11 | 52 |
| 11 | 4 | Alex Davison | Stone Brothers Racing | 13 | +21.556s | 14 | 48 |
| 12 | 11 | Jason Bargwanna | Kelly Racing | 13 | +22.555s | 15 | 46 |
| 13 | 34 | Michael Caruso | Garry Rogers Motorsport | 13 | +23.041s | 23 | 44 |
| 14 | 6 | Steven Richards | Ford Performance Racing | 13 | +23.901s | 21 | 42 |
| 15 | 15 | Rick Kelly | Kelly Racing | 13 | +25.430s | 24 | 40 |
| 16 | 8 | Jason Richards | Brad Jones Racing | 13 | +25.633s | 13 | 38 |
| 17 | 47 | Tim Slade | James Rosenberg Racing | 13 | +28.267s | 18 | 36 |
| 18 | 51 | Greg Murphy | Paul Morris Motorsport | 13 | +28.487s | 20 | 34 |
| 19 | 14 | Jason Bright | Brad Jones Racing | 13 | +30.182s | 16 | 32 |
| 20 | 39 | Russell Ingall | Paul Morris Motorsport | 13 | +32.096s | 17 | 30 |
| 21 | 12 | Dean Fiore | Triple F Racing | 13 | +32.767s | 22 | 28 |
| 22 | 3 | Tony D'Alberto | Tony D'Alberto Racing | 13 | +33.913s | 25 | 26 |
| 23 | 10 | Andrew Thompson | Walkinshaw Racing | 13 | +36.333s | 28 | 24 |
| 24 | 30 | Daniel Gaunt | Lucas Dumbrell Motorsport | 13 | +37.535s | 26 | 22 |
| 25 | 21 | Karl Reindler | Britek Motorsport | 13 | +37.818s | 27 | 20 |
| 26 | 19 | Jonathon Webb | Tekno Autosports | 13 | +1:01.049s | 19 | 18 |
| 27 | 16 | Tony Ricciardello | Kelly Racing | 13 | +1:12.846s | 29 | 16 |
| 28 | 24 | Fabian Coulthard | Walkinshaw Racing | 12 | +1 Lap | 12 | 14 |
| Ret | 7 | Todd Kelly | Kelly Racing | 3 | | 6 | 0 |

=== Race 3 ===
Race timesheets:

| Pos | No | Name | Team | Laps | Time/Retired | Grid | Points |
|---|---|---|---|---|---|---|---|
| 1 | 2 | Garth Tander | Holden Racing Team | 13 | 0:29:11.2684 | 1 | 100 |
| 2 | 9 | Shane van Gisbergen | Stone Brothers Racing | 13 | +2.870s | 4 | 92 |
| 3 | 22 | Will Davison | Holden Racing Team | 13 | +4.107s | 6 | 86 |
| 4 | 888 | Craig Lowndes | Triple Eight Race Engineering | 13 | +4.395s | 8 | 80 |
| 5 | 17 | Steven Johnson | Dick Johnson Racing | 13 | +6.713s | 7 | 74 |
| 6 | 55 | Paul Dumbrell | Tony D'Alberto Racing | 13 | +7.456s | 9 | 68 |
| 7 | 8 | Jason Richards | Brad Jones Racing | 13 | +9.616s | 16 | 64 |
| 8 | 39 | Russell Ingall | Paul Morris Motorsport | 13 | +10.474s | 20 | 60 |
| 9 | 51 | Greg Murphy | Paul Morris Motorsport | 13 | +12.763s | 18 | 56 |
| 10 | 7 | Todd Kelly | Kelly Racing | 13 | +13.527s | 29 | 52 |
| 11 | 33 | Lee Holdsworth | Garry Rogers Motorsport | 13 | +17.001s | 10 | 48 |
| 12 | 6 | Steven Richards | Ford Performance Racing | 13 | +19.657s | 14 | 46 |
| 13 | 15 | Rick Kelly | Kelly Racing | 13 | +22.728s | 15 | 44 |
| 14 | 24 | Fabian Coulthard | Walkinshaw Racing | 13 | +24.942s | 28 | 42 |
| 15 | 4 | Alex Davison | Stone Brothers Racing | 13 | +25.420s | 11 | 40 |
| 16 | 19 | Jonathon Webb | Tekno Autosports | 13 | +25.771s | 26 | 38 |
| 17 | 3 | Tony D'Alberto | Tony D'Alberto Racing | 13 | +26.118s | 22 | 36 |
| 18 | 30 | Daniel Gaunt | Lucas Dumbrell Motorsport | 13 | +27.075s | 24 | 34 |
| 19 | 21 | Karl Reindler | Britek Motorsport | 13 | +31.130s | 25 | 32 |
| 20 | 14 | Jason Bright | Brad Jones Racing | 13 | +1:19.762s | 19 | 30 |
| Ret | 18 | James Courtney | Dick Johnson Racing | 7 | | 3 | 0 |
| Ret | 5 | Mark Winterbottom | Ford Performance Racing | 5 | | 5 | 0 |
| Ret | 10 | Andrew Thompson | Walkinshaw Racing | 4 | | 23 | 0 |
| Ret | 1 | Jamie Whincup | Triple Eight Race Engineering | 2 | | 2 | 0 |
| Ret | 16 | Tony Ricciardello | Kelly Racing | 1 | | 27 | 0 |
| Ret | 34 | Michael Caruso | Garry Rogers Motorsport | 1 | | 13 | 0 |
| Ret | 11 | Jason Bargwanna | Kelly Racing | 0 | | 12 | 0 |
| Ret | 47 | Tim Slade | James Rosenberg Racing | 0 | | 17 | 0 |
| Ret | 12 | Dean Fiore | Triple F Racing | 0 | | 21 | 0 |

=== Points ===
Race timesheets:

| Pos | Name | Race 1 | Race 2 | Race 3 | Total |
|---|---|---|---|---|---|
| 1 | Garth Tander | 92 | 100 | 100 | 292 |
| 2 | Shane van Gisbergen | 86 | 80 | 92 | 258 |
| 3 | Craig Lowndes | 80 | 60 | 80 | 220 |
| 4 | Will Davison | 52 | 68 | 86 | 206 |
| 5 | Steven Johnson | 60 | 64 | 74 | 198 |
| 6 | Paul Dumbrell | 64 | 56 | 68 | 188 |
| 7 | James Courtney | 100 | 86 | 0 | 186 |
| 8 | Jamie Whincup | 74 | 92 | 0 | 166 |
| 9 | Lee Holdsworth | 48 | 52 | 48 | 148 |
| 10 | Jason Richards | 44 | 38 | 64 | 146 |
| 11 | Alex Davison | 42 | 48 | 40 | 130 |
| 12 | Mark Winterbottom | 56 | 74 | 0 | 130 |
| 13 | Russell Ingall | 36 | 30 | 60 | 126 |
| 14 | Greg Murphy | 30 | 34 | 56 | 120 |
| 15 | Todd Kelly | 68 | 0 | 52 | 120 |
| 16 | Steven Richards | 28 | 42 | 46 | 116 |
| 17 | Rick Kelly | 22 | 40 | 44 | 106 |
| 18 | Fabian Coulthard | 46 | 14 | 42 | 102 |
| 19 | Jason Bright | 38 | 32 | 30 | 100 |
| 20 | Jonathon Webb | 32 | 18 | 38 | 88 |
| 21 | Jason Bargwanna | 40 | 46 | 0 | 86 |
| 22 | Tony D'Alberto | 20 | 26 | 36 | 82 |
| 23 | Daniel Gaunt | 18 | 22 | 34 | 74 |
| 24 | Tim Slade | 34 | 36 | 0 | 70 |
| 25 | Karl Reindler | 16 | 20 | 32 | 68 |
| 26 | Michael Caruso | 24 | 44 | 0 | 68 |
| 27 | Dean Fiore | 26 | 28 | 0 | 54 |
| 28 | Andrew Thompson | 14 | 24 | 0 | 38 |
| 29 | Tony Ricciardello | 12 | 16 | 0 | 28 |

== See also ==
2010 Australian Grand Prix
