= José Abed =

- Born: 1940
- Died: 2 June 2022 (aged 81–82)
- Citizenship: Mexico

José Abed (1940 – 2 June 2022) was Mexican motor sport executive. He was a key figure in the motor sport industry in Mexico and Latin America.

== Early life and career ==
José Abed was born in 1940 and began competing as an automobile and motorcycle driver in 1961. He won several racing competition in the 1960s in several Mexican race tracks. In 1985, he founded the Mexican Organisation of International Motor Sport (OMDAI), a member of the Fédération Internationale de l'Automobile (FIA), serving initially as vice-president before being appointed president in 2003. In 1986, he began promoting truck racing in Mexico and was appointed president of the Mexican Grand Prix organizing committee, a position he held until 1992.

In 1990 and 1991, Abed served as president of the organizing committee for the International Championship of Prototype Cars, and from 1990 to 1995 he served as a steward at multiple international Grand Prix events. In the 1990s, Abed briefly acquired ownership of Liga MX team Club Puebla before returning to motorsport full time.
