= 2015 Mexican Grand Prix =

17th round of the 2015 Formula One season

Race 17 of 19 in the 2015 Formula One World Championship
| ← Previous race | Next race → |
- Layout of the Autódromo Hermanos Rodríguez

Race details
- Date: 1 November 2015
- Official name: Formula 1 Gran Premio de México 2015
- Location: Autódromo Hermanos Rodríguez; Magdalena Mixhuca, Mexico City, Mexico
- Course: Permanent racing facility
- Course length: 4.304 km (2.674 miles)
- Distance: 71 laps, 305.354 km (189.738 miles)
- Weather: Partly cloudy 22–24 °C (72–75 °F) air temperature 48–56 °C (118–133 °F) track temperature 1.5 m/s (4.9 ft/s) wind from the northwest
- Attendance: 134,850 (Race Day)

Pole position
| Driver | (Germany) Nico Rosberg | Mercedes |
- Time: 1:19.480

Fastest lap
| Driver | (Germany) Nico Rosberg | Mercedes |
- Time: 1:20.521 on lap 67

Podium
| First | (Germany) Nico Rosberg | Mercedes |
| Second | (United Kingdom) Lewis Hamilton | Mercedes |
| Third | (Finland) Valtteri Bottas | Williams-Mercedes |

The 2015 Mexican Grand Prix (formally known as the Formula 1 Gran Premio de México 2015) was a Formula One motor race held at the Autódromo Hermanos Rodríguez in Mexico City on 1 November 2015. The race, which was contested over seventy-one laps, was the seventeenth race of the 2015 Formula One season. It marked the seventeenth time that the Mexican Grand Prix had been run as a round of the Formula One World Championship since its inception in 1950, and the first time that the race had been run since 1992.

Nico Rosberg qualified in pole position, having already been fastest in two of the three free practice sessions. He won the race for Mercedes, followed by his teammate Lewis Hamilton, who had secured the Drivers' Championship at the previous event in the United States. Valtteri Bottas completed the podium in third, driving for Williams. Both Ferrari drivers—Sebastian Vettel and Kimi Räikkönen—retired after crashes, with both losing one position in the Championship to Rosberg and Bottas respectively. It was the first time since the 2006 Australian Grand Prix that neither Ferrari was classified. (Note: Neither Ferrari finished the 2008 Australian Grand Prix or 2009 Australian Grand Prix, but one of the drivers (Räikkönen on both occasions) was classified as he had completed 90% of the race distance.)

== Report ==
=== Background ===
The Autódromo Hermanos Rodríguez circuit underwent substantial reconfiguration in the build-up to the event. The first corner complex was tightened on entry, while the middle part of the track was completely re-profiled, retaining much of the original design whilst reducing the reliance on aerodynamic grip. The most significant changes were made in the final part, with the Peraltada corner cut in half and the circuit redirected through the Foro Sol stadium complex in the circuit infield beginning with turn 12, following a similar layout to the one used by Champ Car between 2002 and 2007. The track layout featured two drag reduction system (DRS) zones, one on the main straight and another between turns three and four.

One week prior to the race, Hurricane Patricia—the largest tropical storm cell in the Northern Hemisphere on record—crossed the Mexican coastline near Cuixmala in Jalisco state. Patricia had previously disrupted the United States Grand Prix.

==== Tyres ====
Tyre supplier Pirelli brought four compounds to the race. As for all races, the blue-banded wet and green-banded intermediate tyres were provided for possible rain. As for dry-weather (or "slick") tyres, Pirelli supplied the teams with the soft and medium compounds, the two middle options of their four tyres for the 2015 season.

=== Free practice ===
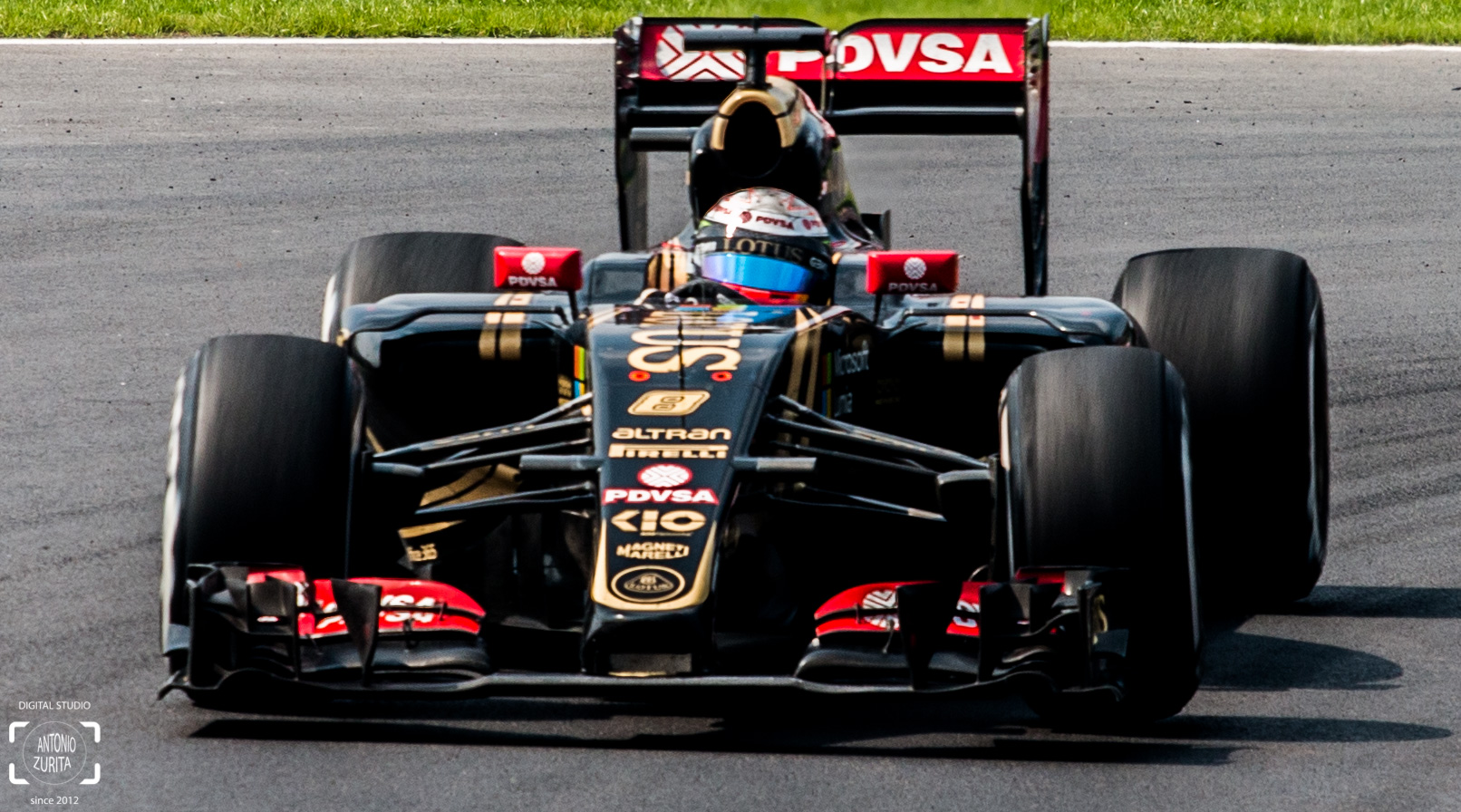
Romain Grosjean had to sit out the first practice session for the eleventh time in 2015.

Per the regulations for the 2015 season, three practice sessions were scheduled, two 1.5-hour sessions on Friday and another one-hour session before qualifying on Saturday. The first session on Friday started on a damp track, described by Sebastian Vettel as "ridiculously slippery", with the first half-hour of running done on intermediate tyres. Valtteri Bottas set the fastest time on those tyres, before all teams switched on the medium compound. Even on the dry tyres, still many drivers were fooled by the conditions, going off at turns 8 and 10 in particular. Nico Rosberg's Mercedes suffered from overheating rear brakes, forcing him back to the pit lane while he held the fastest time. Carlos Sainz Jr. recorded the most timed laps with 37, and finished eighth fastest, ahead of local favourite Sergio Pérez and Felipe Massa. Jolyon Palmer again replaced Romain Grosjean at the wheel of the Lotus, as he would do for the rest of the season, and finished fifteenth fastest, 0.2 seconds slower than teammate Pastor Maldonado. The fastest time of the session was set by Max Verstappen in the Toro Rosso, at 1:25.990, even though he went off in the second sector of the track. He was followed by Daniil Kvyat and the two Ferrari cars of Kimi Räikkönen and Sebastian Vettel. While Rosberg was demoted to sixth, newly crowned World Champion Lewis Hamilton was only eleventh fastest.

In the second session on Friday afternoon, Nico Rosberg was fastest, setting a time of 1:21.531. With the track tarmac still being very new, the surface was slippery and it was another session that saw a lot of drivers get caught out. The biggest accident of the practice came after just five minutes, when Max Verstappen crashed at the exit of the stadium, bringing out red flags. After the running resumed, Valtteri Bottas lost the rear of his Williams FW37, caused by a fault in his DRS flap, and crashed at turn one. He was not the only one having problems in the first corner, as Sergio Pérez, Carlos Sainz Jr. and Pastor Maldonado also went off there. Lewis Hamilton meanwhile had an off-track moment at turn four. Romain Grosjean had to end his first practice of the weekend early, when a clutch failure saw him park his car 28 minutes into the session. Jenson Button ran 25 laps and finished ninth fastest albeit spending half of the session in the pit lane, while the team equipped his car with a new power unit. Behind Rosberg, the two Red Bull drivers were second and third, ahead of Lewis Hamilton and Sebastian Vettel.

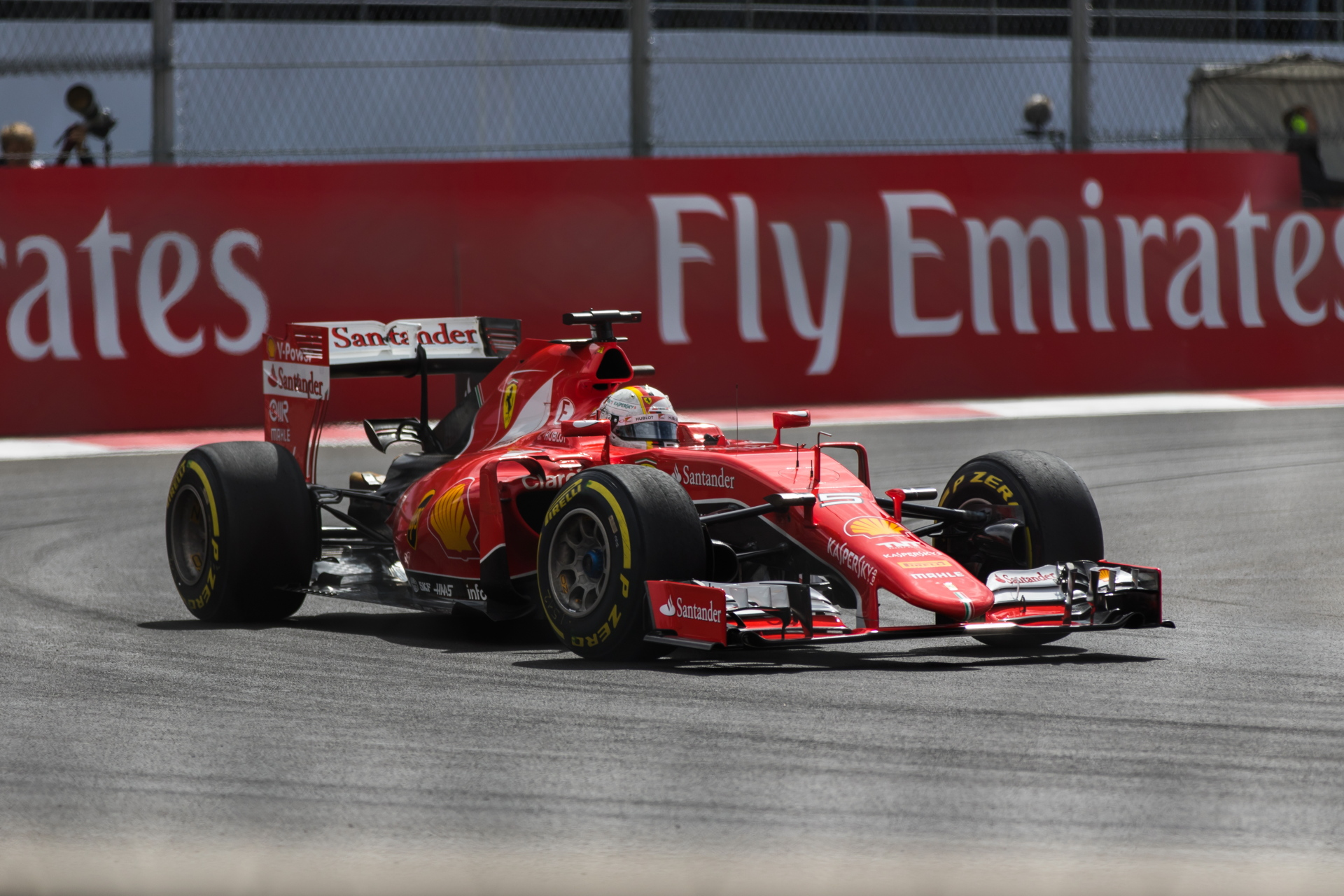
Sebastian Vettel during free practice on Saturday

Nico Rosberg was again fastest in the final practice session on Saturday morning with a time of 1:21.083, edging out teammate Hamilton by 0.014 seconds. After rainfall during the night, the track was slippery at the beginning of practice. It was not until thirty minutes into the session that the grip improved and many teams then opted to run the faster soft compound tyres. Rosberg set the fastest times early on and while Hamilton was able to close the gap gradually, he ended the session slightly slower than Rosberg. Behind the two Mercedes cars, Daniel Ricciardo was 0.118 seconds behind, followed by Vettel, another tenth of a second adrift. Reporting vibrations from his engine, Jenson Button again spent much time in the garage, ending the practice with the slowest time, more than eight seconds behind Rosberg. The long main straight of the Autódromo Hermanos Rodríguez delivered the fastest speeds seen during the 2015 season. Due to their lack of pure power, McLaren expected to struggle during the remainder of the weekend.

=== Qualifying ===
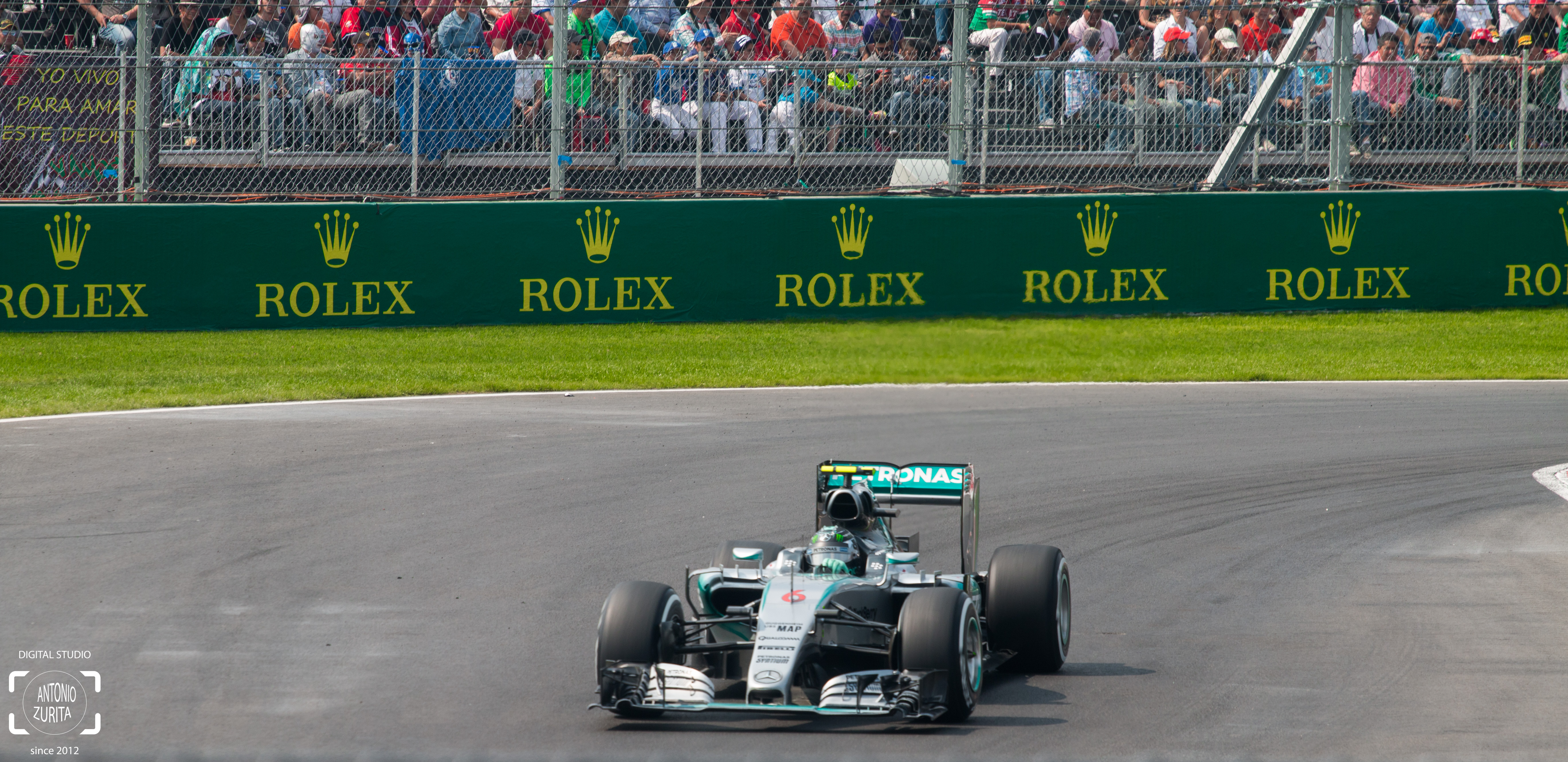
Nico Rosberg took pole position for Mercedes.

Qualifying consisted of three parts, 18, 15 and 12 minutes in length respectively, with five drivers eliminated from competing after each of the first two sessions. During the first part of qualifying (Q1), Kimi Räikkönen was able to compete, after the Ferrari crew was able to change his gearbox in time for the session. Not running was Jenson Button, after his team decided not to go out, since a 55-place grid penalty would have placed him at the back of the grid at any case. Marcus Ericsson was more than half a second quicker than teammate Felipe Nasr, who failed to proceed into Q2, as did both Manor Marussia drivers. With Button out of the running, just one more driver was eliminated, and that proved to be his McLaren teammate Alonso, who barely missed out on making the cut. At the front, Rosberg set the fastest time ahead of Vettel, while Hamilton was the only driver not to use the soft compound tyre.

Lewis Hamilton did go out on the softer tyres in Q2, setting the fastest time of the session, the first to lap in under 1 minute, 20 seconds. Behind him Vettel was second ahead of Rosberg. Räikkönen went out on the harder compound tyre, but aborted his running after spinning in turn one, leaving him fifteenth fastest with a grid penalty for his gearbox change yet to come. Max Verstappen put in a fast lap towards the end of the session, demoting his teammate Sainz Jr. out of the top ten. Also eliminated were both Lotus and the second Sauber of Ericsson.

In Q3, both Mercedes drivers set two consecutive fast laps at the beginning of the session, with Rosberg coming out on top, 0.188 seconds ahead of his teammate. All drivers had problems in improving on their times during the second run of timed laps on fresher tyres. While Hamilton did improve early in the lap, his effort was stopped when he made a mistake at turn twelve. This meant that he was unable to challenge Rosberg for pole position, who qualified first for the fourth race in a row. The two Mercedes drivers were closely followed by Vettel, ahead of the two Red Bulls of Kvyat and Ricciardo, both Williams cars and Verstappen in eighth. On the fifth row of the grid, local favourite Sergio Pérez edged out teammate Nico Hülkenberg for ninth.

=== Race ===
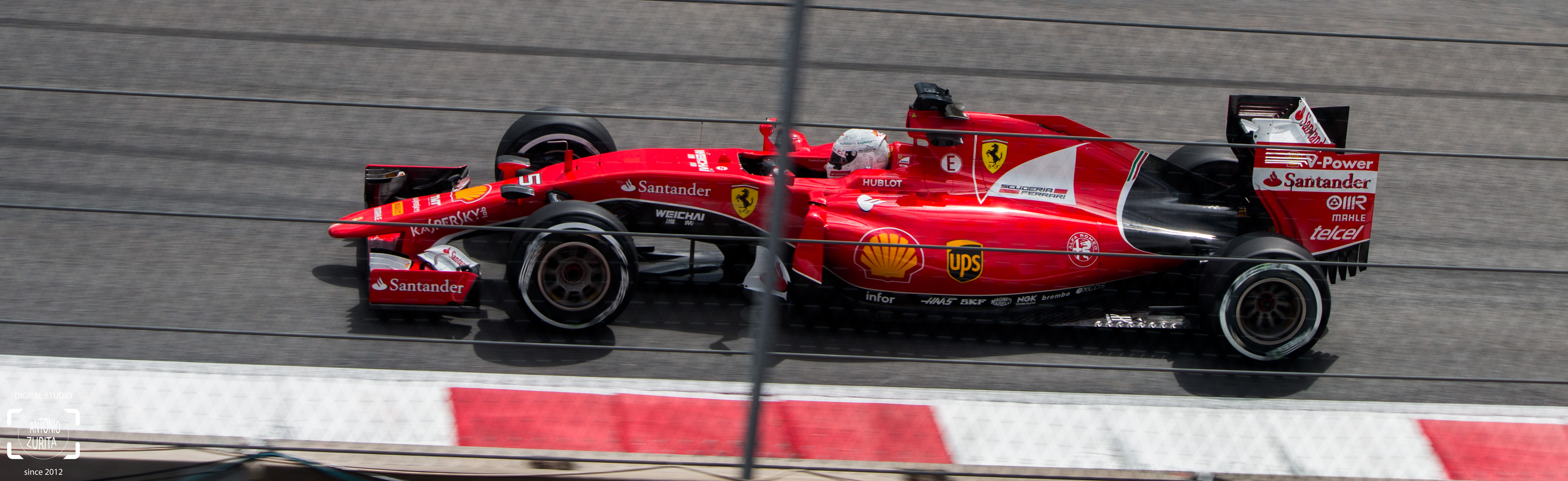
Sebastian Vettel suffered a puncture at the start and later retired after a crash.

At the start, Nico Rosberg got away well, fending off an attack by teammate Hamilton into the first corner. Behind them, Vettel had a bad getaway that saw him get in the midst of the Red Bull cars. In turn 5, he touched Daniel Ricciardo's car, suffering a puncture that forced him into the pit lane at the end of the first lap. While he was able to get back out, Fernando Alonso ended his race after just one lap due to a loss of power. Therefore, the order after the first lap stood as: Rosberg, Hamilton, Kvyat and Ricciardo. The two Mercedes cars of Rosberg and Hamilton soon opened a gap on the Red Bull cars of Kvyat and Ricciardo, exchanging fastest laps in the process, while Felipe Massa and Max Verstappen got entangled in a fight for sixth place. Kimi Räikkönen, who was told early on to cool his brakes, made good progress up the field and was in 13th position by lap 8. One lap later, Valtteri Bottas became the first of the front runners to pit, putting on the medium compound, followed just a lap later by teammate Massa. While Räikkönen had moved up to eighth place by lap 12, Sergio Pérez and Carlos Sainz Jr. got into a fight for sixth place, with Pérez being asked by his team to stay out as long as possible.

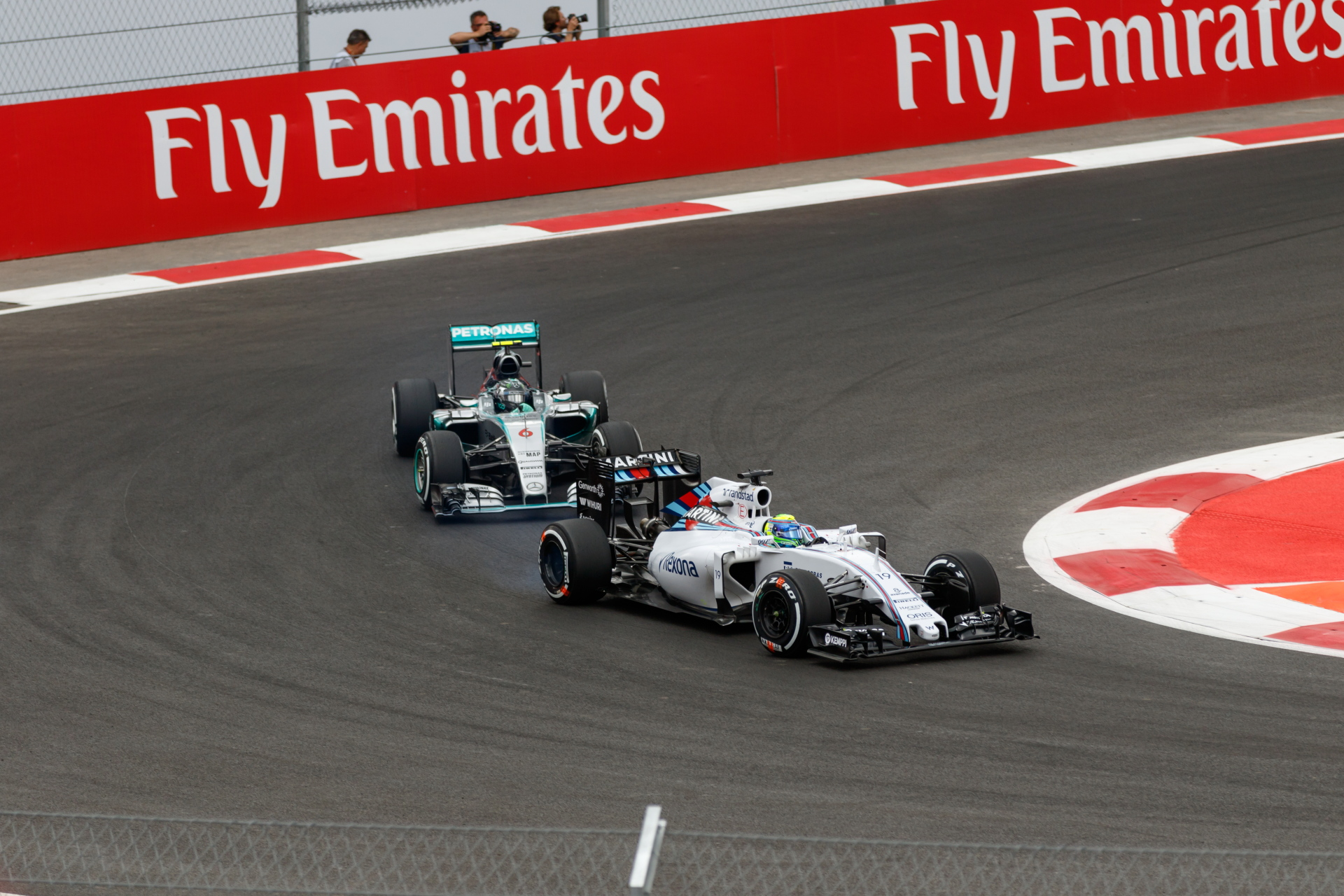
Nico Rosberg (seen here behind Felipe Massa) won the race.

Sebastian Vettel slowly moved up the field, running eleventh on lap 18, only to spin a lap later at turn seven, falling back to 16th. He subsequently complained about a flat spot on his tyre, but continued without pitting. On lap 20, Sergio Pérez made a pit stop for new tyres and a front wing adjustment. Since the stop took longer than expected, he rejoined just before Sainz Jr., who used the momentum to pass Pérez into turn one. Meanwhile, Räikkönen and Bottas were racing for sixth place. On lap 24, Bottas attacked around the outside into turn two, sticking to the inside line at the following corner, where Räikkönen did not back away and ran into the front-left of the Williams, breaking his own rear-right suspension and forcing him to retire on the spot, while Bottas was able to carry on. Rosberg came in for his scheduled pit stop on lap 27, while Hamilton waited two laps to follow suit, trying to get ahead. This proved unsuccessful, as he rejoined behind Rosberg after his stop on lap 29. On lap 35, Sergio Pérez attempted to overtake Carlos Sainz Jr. for ninth, who ran wide and kept his position. After his team radio informed him that he had done so by going off track, he handed the position to Pérez. Sebastian Vettel made a pit stop for a second time on lap 37 and rejoined in between the two Mercedes of Rosberg and Hamilton, albeit a lap down. He was told to let Hamilton go by as well some laps later.

On lap 48, Mercedes changed strategies, bringing in both drivers for another tyre stop, much to the dismay of Lewis Hamilton, who complained to his team over the radio. Meanwhile, a fight developed between Massa and Ricciardo for fifth place, with the latter making the pass at the beginning of lap 53. On the same lap, Sebastian Vettel spun once more at turn seven, this time hitting the barriers, ending his race and bringing out the safety car. The double retirement marked the first time since the 2006 Australian Grand Prix that none of their cars were classified. During the caution period, the order stood as: Rosberg, Hamilton, Kvyat, Bottas, Ricciardo, Massa, Hülkenberg, Pérez, Verstappen and Grosjean. At the restart at the beginning of lap 58, Bottas made a move on Kvyat into turn one, taking third place. Nasr retired on the same lap due to a brake issue. Over the last laps of the race, Hamilton was able to close on Rosberg, as was Massa on the two Red Bull drivers ahead of him. However, neither were able to overtake, and Rosberg crossed the finish line to take victory, followed by Hamilton and Bottas.

=== Post-race ===
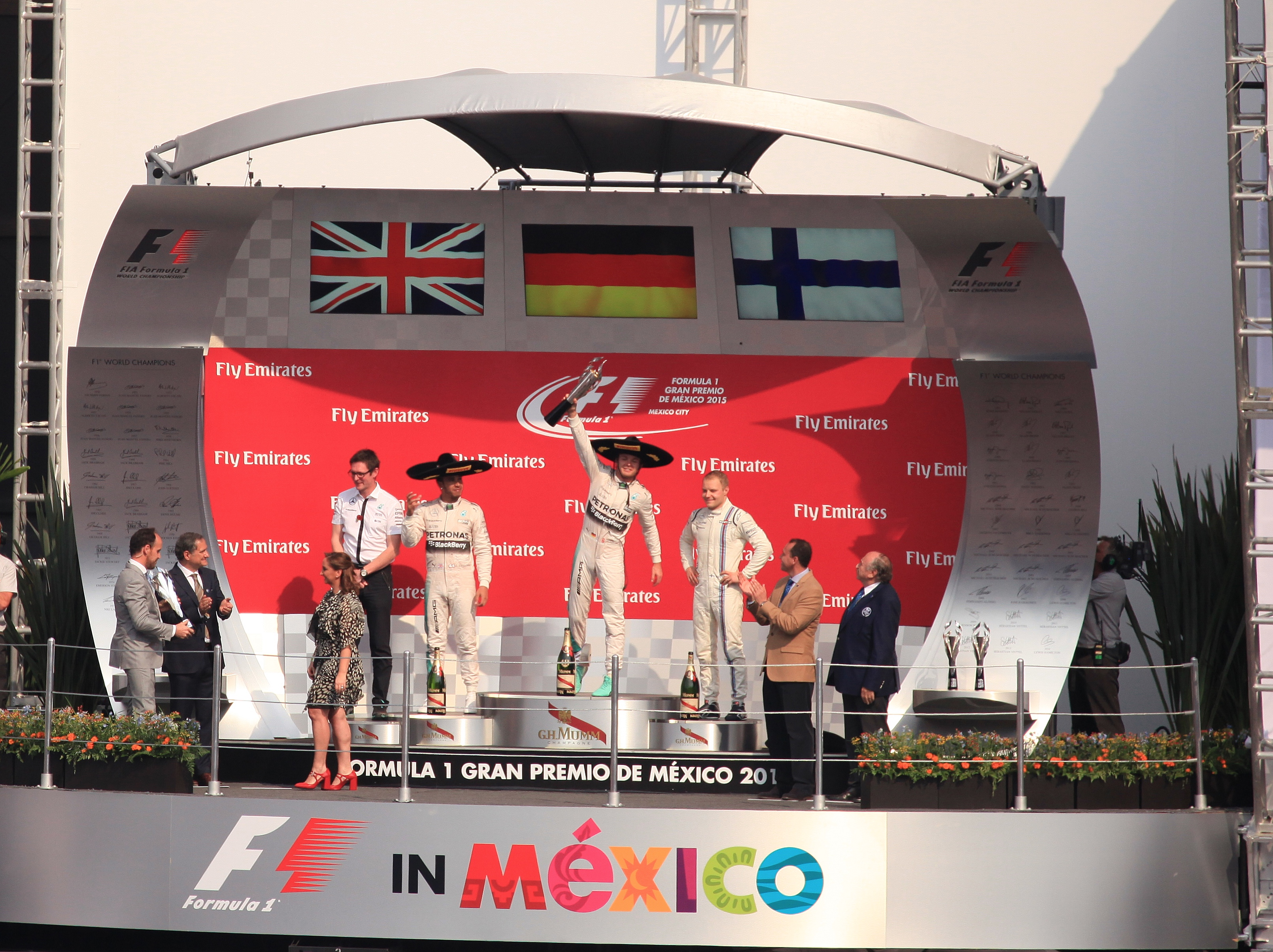
The podium ceremony: Rosberg (centre) lifting the winner's trophy, Hamilton (left) and Bottas (right) and Mercedes team representative Andrew Shovlin (far left).

At the podium ceremony, the interviews were conducted by Nigel Mansell, who had won the last race at the venue in 1992. Both Mercedes drivers complimented each other's driving, highlighting the atmosphere and the enthusiasm of the fans in Mexico. Valtteri Bottas thanked his team, saying that they were "racing like a race-winning team". During the post-race press conference, Lewis Hamilton described it as "one of the fun races for me", since he did not have to worry about points at that point. However, new frictions emerged at Mercedes as Hamilton later asserted that the team had favoured Rosberg over the weekend in order to "keep him happy".

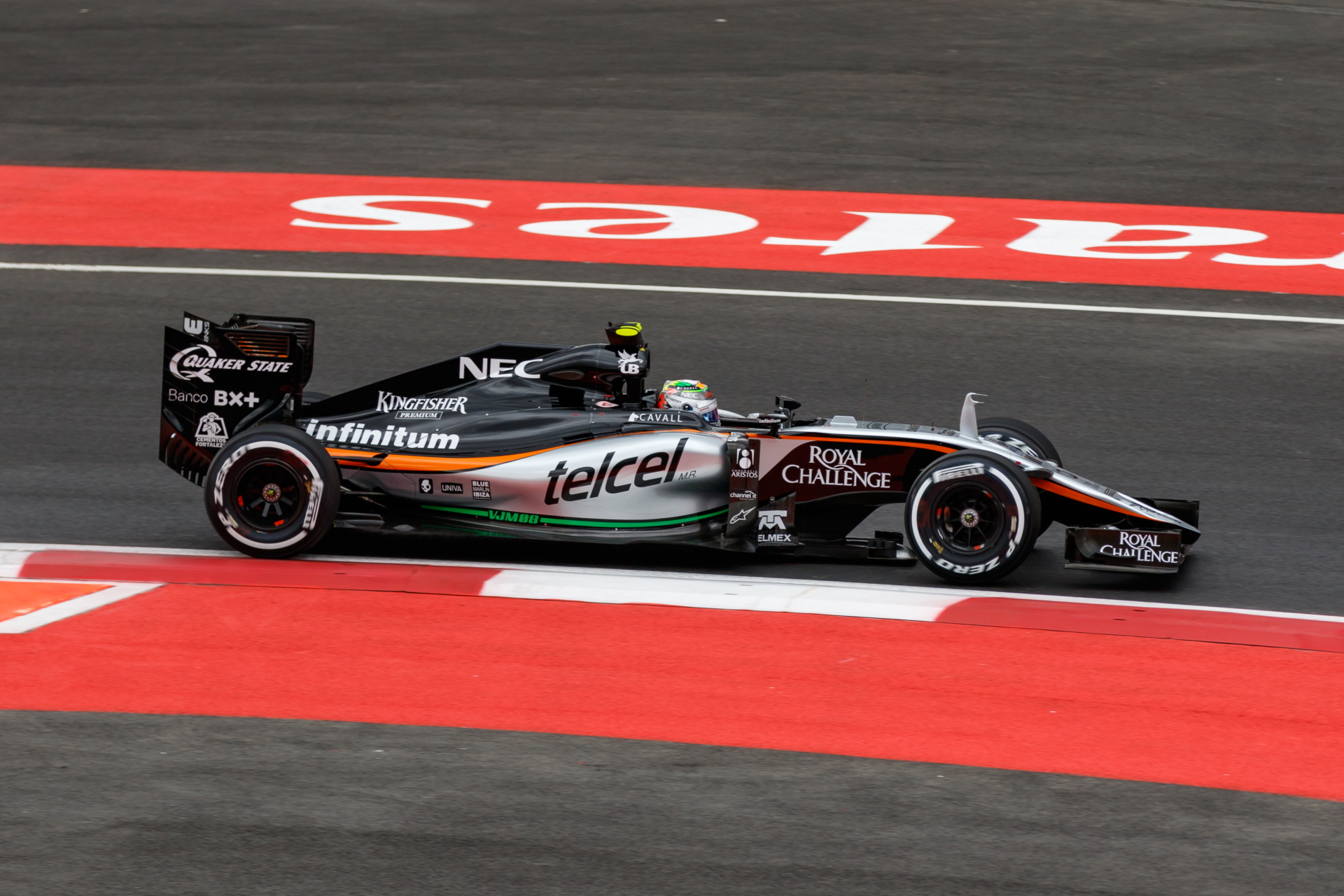
Local Sergio Pérez was satisfied with his performance.

Local favourite Sergio Pérez, who had been on a one-stop strategy, said after the race that it had been the safety car period that "destroyed" his chances at a better result, but added: "What I could do, I did perfectly, so I'm happy with that." His teammate Nico Hülkenberg had finished the race in front of him, and said after the race: "The Safety Car ended up playing into my hands, which is the little bit of luck you always need to get a good result". Speaking about the race, 14th-placed Jenson Button said: "Painful, I think, is the word. I was on the harder tyre at the start but still it was just waving goodbye to everyone in front really." He also stated that he believed that McLaren were more affected by the high altitude than the other teams. On his one-lap outing, Fernando Alonso explained that the problem that caused his retirement had been discovered the night before. He added: "We had two possibilities, retire the car without even starting the race or try our maximum, knowing that maybe one or two laps was the maximum we could achieve [...]. We did one lap, for respect of the fans because they were amazing all weekend."

Following their worst weekend in almost ten years, Ferrari were self-critical. Sebastian Vettel was quoted as describing his race as "a shit job", and later took full responsibility for his race ending crash, saying that he "probably just ask[ed] or want[ed] a little bit too much". Speaking about the collision between Kimi Räikkönen and Valtteri Bottas, Ferrari team principal Maurizio Arrivabene said: "It's an accident, it's part of the show. I don't want to blame anybody." He went on to describe the weekend as "a good lesson" for the team, taking positive things from the race, such as the good race pace shown by both cars. As a result of their double retirement, both Ferrari drivers lost their respective positions in the Drivers' Championship. While Vettel was overtaken by Rosberg into second place, Räikkönen lost fourth position to Valtteri Bottas. In the Constructors' Standings, Williams moved closer to Ferrari in second place, now trailing them by 131 points.

At the FIA Prize Giving Ceremony on 3 December 2015, the organizers were awarded the prize as Best Promoter.

== Classification ==
=== Qualifying ===
| Pos. | Car no. | Driver | Constructor | Qualifying times | | | Final grid |
| Pos. | Car no. | Driver | Constructor | Q1 | Q2 | Q3 | Final grid |
|---|---|---|---|---|---|---|---|
| 1 | 6 | (Germany) Nico Rosberg | Mercedes | 1:20.436 | 1:20.053 | 1:19.480 | 1 |
| 2 | 44 | (United Kingdom) Lewis Hamilton | Mercedes | 1:20.808 | 1:19.829 | 1:19.668 | 2 |
| 3 | 5 | (Germany) Sebastian Vettel | Ferrari | 1:20.503 | 1:20.045 | 1:19.850 | 3 |
| 4 | 26 | (Russia) Daniil Kvyat | Red Bull Racing-Renault | 1:20.826 | 1:20.490 | 1:20.398 | 4 |
| 5 | 3 | (Australia) Daniel Ricciardo | Red Bull Racing-Renault | 1:21.166 | 1:20.783 | 1:20.399 | 5 |
| 6 | 77 | (Finland) Valtteri Bottas | Williams-Mercedes | 1:20.817 | 1:20.458 | 1:20.448 | 6 |
| 7 | 19 | (Brazil) Felipe Massa | Williams-Mercedes | 1:21.379 | 1:20.642 | 1:20.567 | 7 |
| 8 | 33 | (Netherlands) Max Verstappen | Toro Rosso-Renault | 1:20.995 | 1:20.894 | 1:20.710 | 8 |
| 9 | 11 | (Mexico) Sergio Pérez | Force India-Mercedes | 1:20.966 | 1:20.669 | 1:20.716 | 9 |
| 10 | 27 | (Germany) Nico Hülkenberg | Force India-Mercedes | 1:21.315 | 1:20.935 | 1:20.788 | 10 |
| 11 | 55 | (Spain) Carlos Sainz Jr. | Toro Rosso-Renault | 1:20.960 | 1:20.942 | | 11 |
| 12 | 8 | (France) Romain Grosjean | Lotus-Mercedes | 1:21.577 | 1:21.038 | | 12 |
| 13 | 13 | (Venezuela) Pastor Maldonado | Lotus-Mercedes | 1:21.520 | 1:21.261 | | 13 |
| 14 | 9 | (Sweden) Marcus Ericsson | Sauber-Ferrari | 1:21.299 | 1:21.544 | | 14 |
| 15 | 7 | (Finland) Kimi Räikkönen | Ferrari | 1:21.422 | 1:22.494 | | 19^{1} |
| 16 | 14 | (Spain) Fernando Alonso | McLaren-Honda | 1:21.779 | | | 18^{2} |
| 17 | 12 | (Brazil) Felipe Nasr | Sauber-Ferrari | 1:21.788 | | | 15 |
| 18 | 53 | (United States) Alexander Rossi | Marussia-Ferrari | 1:24.136 | | | 16 |
| 19 | 28 | (United Kingdom) Will Stevens | Marussia-Ferrari | 1:24.386 | | | 17 |
107% time: 1:26.067
| — | 22 | (United Kingdom) Jenson Button | McLaren-Honda | no time^{3} | | | 20 |

Notes:

- ^1 – Kimi Räikkönen received a ten- and four five-place grid penalties for exceeding the allowed allocation of four of his power unit components, as well as a five-place grid penalty for an unauthorized gearbox change.
- ^2 – Fernando Alonso received a ten-place grid penalty for an engine change and a five-place grid penalty for an unauthorized gearbox change.
- ^3 – Jenson Button did not set a lap time during Q1. He received permission from the stewards to start the race. Additionally, he received a total of 70 places (three ten- and eight five-place) of grid penalties for exceeding the allowed allocation of five of his power unit components, unscheduled engine and gearbox changes.

=== Race ===
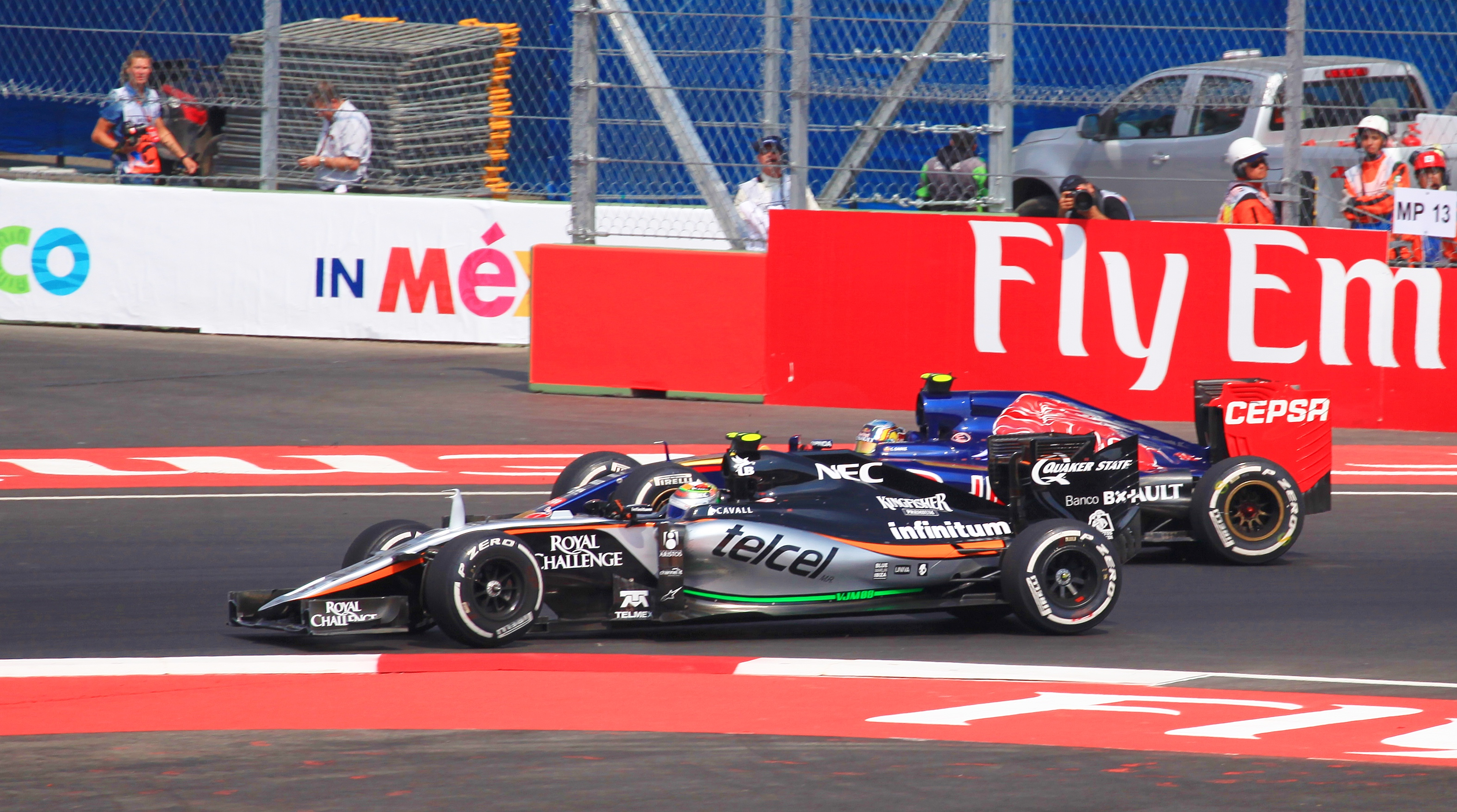
Sergio Pérez racing Carlos Sainz Jr.

| Pos. | No. | Driver | Constructor | Laps | Time/Retired | Grid | Points |
|---|---|---|---|---|---|---|---|
| 1 | 6 | (Germany) Nico Rosberg | Mercedes | 71 | 1:42:35.038 | 1 | 25 |
| 2 | 44 | (United Kingdom) Lewis Hamilton | Mercedes | 71 | +1.954 | 2 | 18 |
| 3 | 77 | (Finland) Valtteri Bottas | Williams-Mercedes | 71 | +14.592 | 6 | 15 |
| 4 | 26 | (Russia) Daniil Kvyat | Red Bull Racing-Renault | 71 | +16.572 | 4 | 12 |
| 5 | 3 | (Australia) Daniel Ricciardo | Red Bull Racing-Renault | 71 | +19.682 | 5 | 10 |
| 6 | 19 | (Brazil) Felipe Massa | Williams-Mercedes | 71 | +21.493 | 7 | 8 |
| 7 | 27 | (Germany) Nico Hülkenberg | Force India-Mercedes | 71 | +25.860 | 10 | 6 |
| 8 | 11 | (Mexico) Sergio Pérez | Force India-Mercedes | 71 | +34.343 | 9 | 4 |
| 9 | 33 | (Netherlands) Max Verstappen | Toro Rosso-Renault | 71 | +35.229 | 8 | 2 |
| 10 | 8 | (France) Romain Grosjean | Lotus-Mercedes | 71 | +37.934 | 12 | 1 |
| 11 | 13 | (Venezuela) Pastor Maldonado | Lotus-Mercedes | 71 | +38.538 | 13 | |
| 12 | 9 | (Sweden) Marcus Ericsson | Sauber-Ferrari | 71 | +40.180 | 14 | |
| 13 | 55 | (Spain) Carlos Sainz Jr. | Toro Rosso-Renault | 71 | +48.772 | 11 | |
| 14 | 22 | (United Kingdom) Jenson Button | McLaren-Honda | 71 | +49.214 | 20 | |
| 15 | 53 | (United States) Alexander Rossi | Marussia-Ferrari | 69 | +2 Laps | 16 | |
| 16 | 28 | (United Kingdom) Will Stevens | Marussia-Ferrari | 69 | +2 Laps | 17 | |
| Ret | 12 | (Brazil) Felipe Nasr | Sauber-Ferrari | 57 | Brakes | 15 | |
| Ret | 5 | (Germany) Sebastian Vettel | Ferrari | 50 | Accident | 3 | |
| Ret | 7 | (Finland) Kimi Räikkönen | Ferrari | 21 | Collision | 19 | |
| Ret | 14 | (Spain) Fernando Alonso | McLaren-Honda | 1 | Power unit | 18 | |

== Championship standings after the race ==
Drivers' Championship standings

| | Pos. | Driver | Points |
|---|---|---|---|
| | 1 | (United Kingdom) Lewis Hamilton | 345 |
| 1 | 2 | (Germany) Nico Rosberg | 272 |
| 1 | 3 | (Germany) Sebastian Vettel | 251 |
| 1 | 4 | (Finland) Valtteri Bottas | 126 |
| 1 | 5 | (Finland) Kimi Räikkönen | 123 |

Constructors' Championship standings

| Pos. | Constructor | Points |
|---|---|---|
| 1 | (Germany) Mercedes | 617 |
| 2 | (Italy) Ferrari | 374 |
| 3 | (United Kingdom) Williams-Mercedes | 243 |
| 4 | (Austria) Red Bull Racing-Renault | 172 |
| 5 | Force India-Mercedes | 112 |

- Note: Only the top five positions are included for both sets of standings.
- Bold text and an asterisk indicates 2015 World Champions.

== Notes ==
| Previous race: 2015 United States Grand Prix | FIA Formula One World Championship; 2015 season | Next race: 2015 Brazilian Grand Prix |
| Previous race: 1992 Mexican Grand Prix | Mexican Grand Prix | Next race: 2016 Mexican Grand Prix |
Awards
| Preceded by 2014 Russian Grand Prix | Formula One Promotional Trophy for Race Promoter; 2015 | Succeeded by 2016 Mexican Grand Prix |
