= 2023 Mexico City Grand Prix =

Nineteenth round of the 2023 F1 season

Race 19 of 22 in the 2023 Formula One World Championship
← Previous race	Next race →
- Layout of the Autódromo Hermanos Rodríguez

Race details
- Date: 29 October 2023
- Official name: Formula 1 Gran Premio de la Ciudad de México 2023
- Location: Autódromo Hermanos Rodríguez; Mexico City, Mexico
- Course: Permanent racing facility
- Course length: 4.304 km (2.674 miles)
- Distance: 71 laps, 305.354 km (189.738 miles)
- Weather: Sunny
- Attendance: 400,639

Pole position
Driver	(Monaco) Charles Leclerc	Ferrari
- Time: 1:17.166

Fastest lap
Driver	(United Kingdom) Lewis Hamilton	Mercedes
- Time: 1:21.334 on lap 71

Podium
First	(Netherlands) Max Verstappen	Red Bull Racing-Honda RBPT
Second	(United Kingdom) Lewis Hamilton	Mercedes
Third	(Monaco) Charles Leclerc	Ferrari

The 2023 Mexico City Grand Prix (officially known as the Formula 1 Gran Premio de la Ciudad de México 2023) was a Formula One motor race held on 29 October 2023 at the Autódromo Hermanos Rodríguez in Mexico City, Mexico. It was the nineteenth round of the 2023 Formula One World Championship. Charles Leclerc took pole position and finished third in the race. Lewis Hamilton finished in second behind Max Verstappen, who took his sixteenth victory of the season, a record in Formula One. Daniel Ricciardo, driving for AlphaTauri, qualified in fourth and finished in seventh, the team's best results of the season for both sessions.

== Background ==
The event was held across the weekend of 27–29 October. It was the nineteenth round of the 2023 Formula One World Championship, the 23rd Formula One Grand Prix at this circuit, and the third held under the name of the Mexico City Grand Prix, having previously been titled the Mexican Grand Prix.

=== Championship standings before the race ===
Coming into the weekend, Max Verstappen led the Drivers' Championship with 466 points. He led his teammate Sergio Pérez by 226 points and Lewis Hamilton by a further 39 points. Hamilton was ahead of Fernando Alonso in fourth by 18 points, with Carlos Sainz Jr. in fifth, 8 points behind Alonso. Red Bull Racing led the Constructors' Championship with 706 points, 362 points ahead of Mercedes and a further 22 points ahead of Ferrari. McLaren, in fourth, was behind Ferrari by 80 points and ahead of Aston Martin, in fifth, by 6 points.

=== Entrants ===
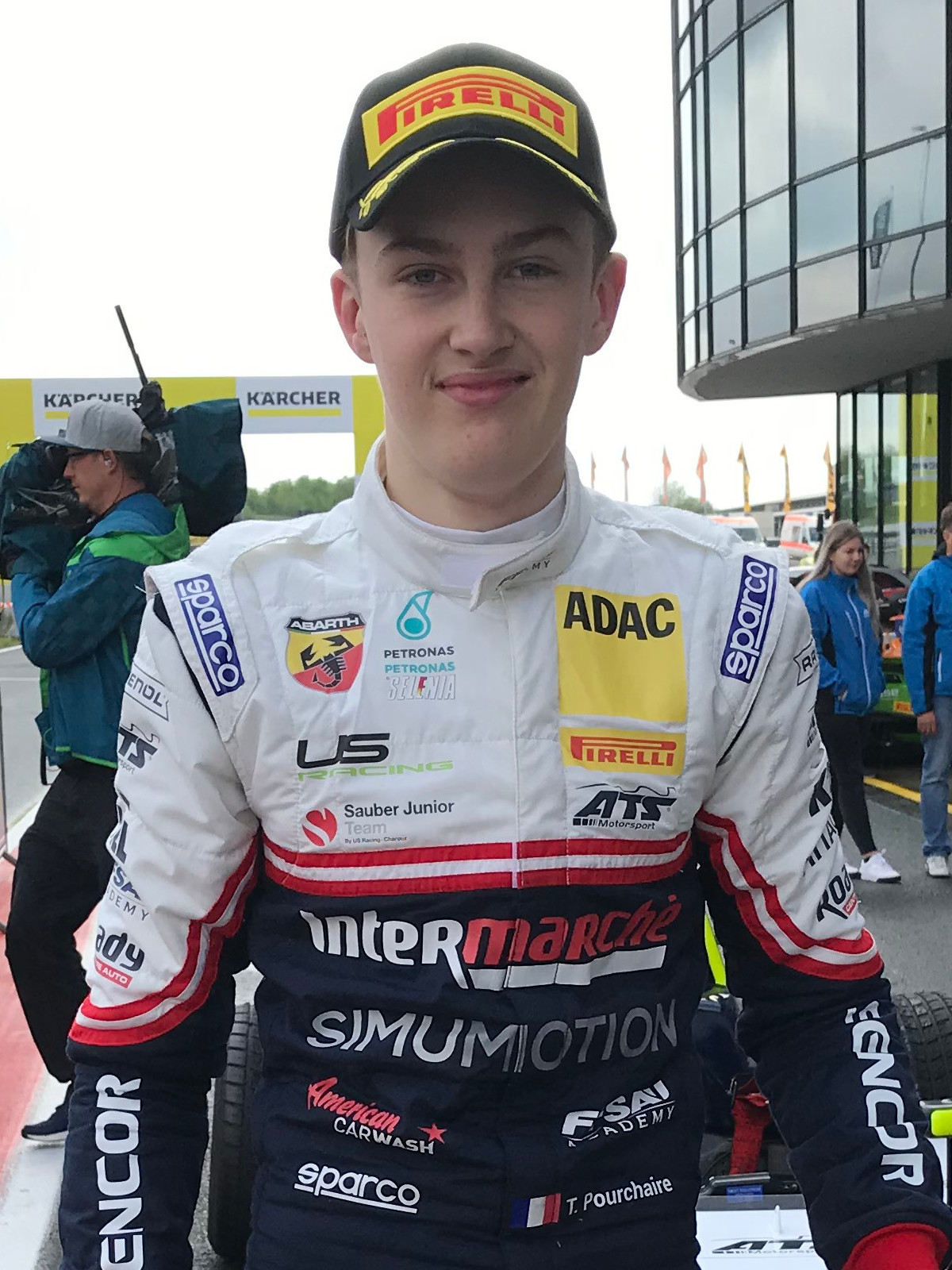
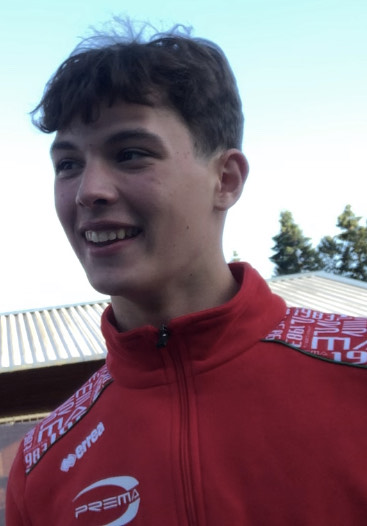
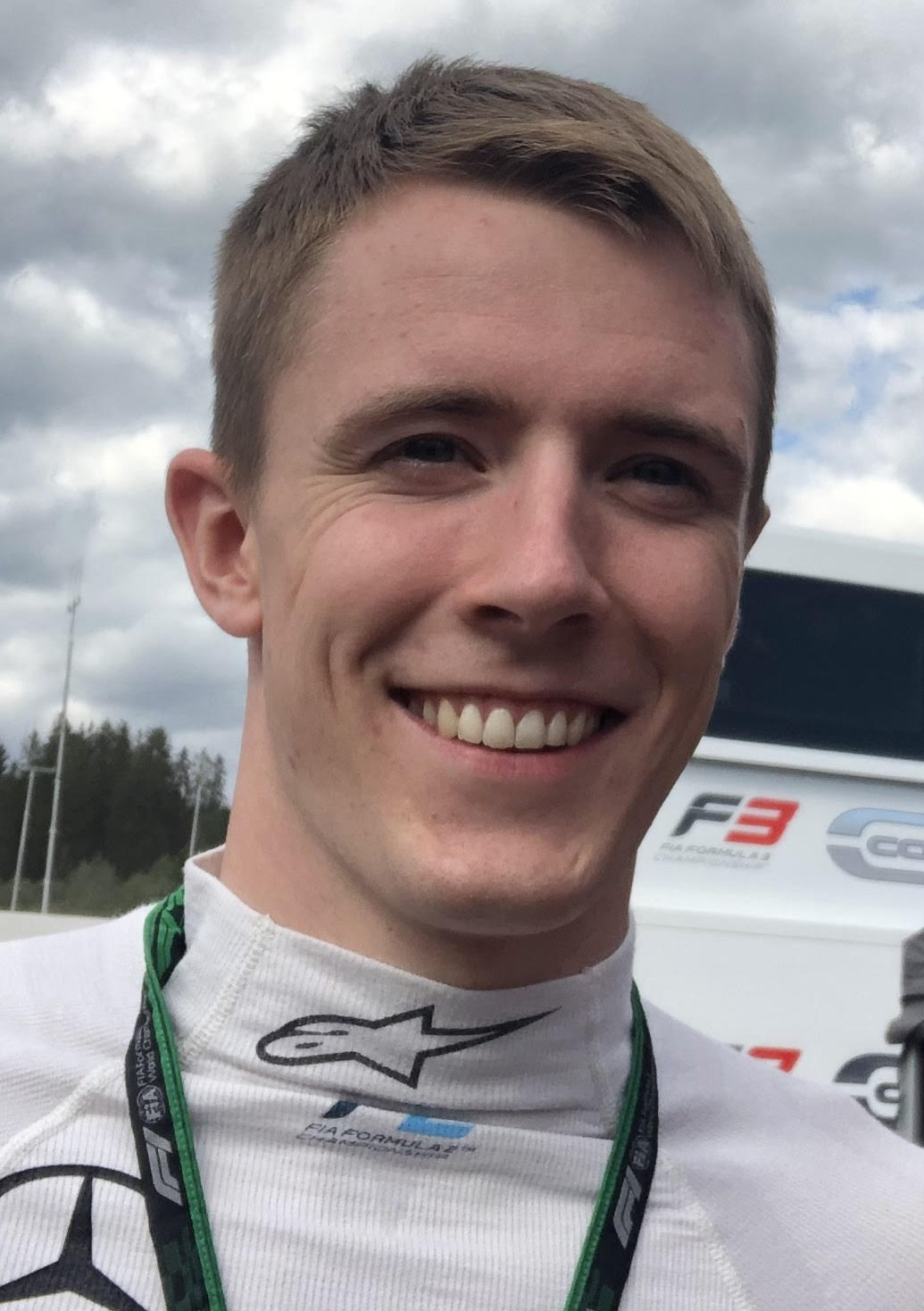
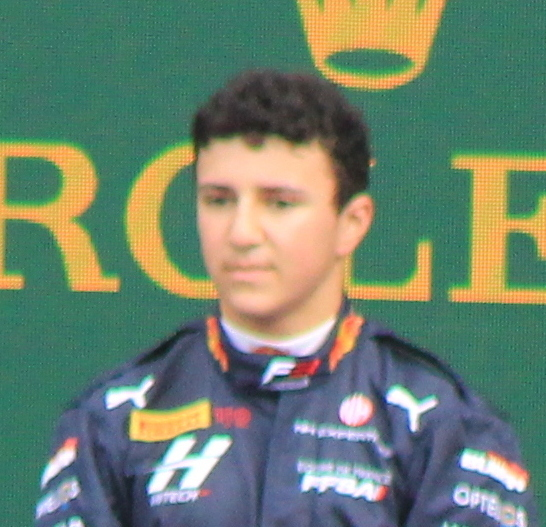
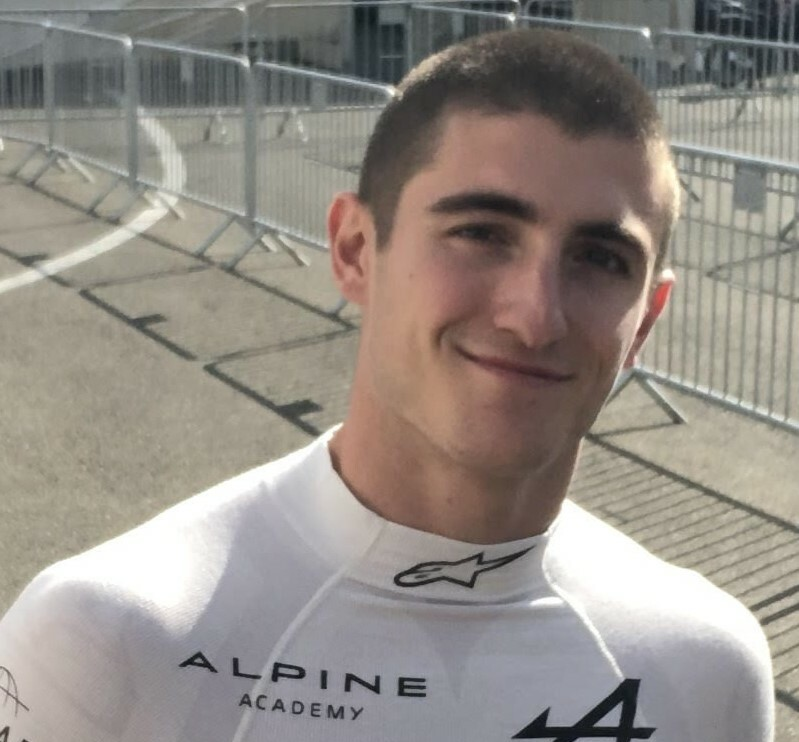
(Clockwise, from top left) Théo Pourchaire, Oliver Bearman, Frederik Vesti, Jack Doohan, and Isack Hadjar drove during the first free practice session.

The drivers and teams were the same as the season entry list with the exception of Daniel Ricciardo, who replaced Nyck de Vries at AlphaTauri starting at the Hungarian Grand Prix. During the first practice session, five teams fielded alternate drivers who had not raced in more than two Grands Prix, as required by the Formula One regulations:

- Théo Pourchaire for Alfa Romeo in place of Valtteri Bottas.
- Oliver Bearman for Haas in place of Kevin Magnussen.
- Frederik Vesti for Mercedes in place of George Russell.
- Jack Doohan for Alpine in place of Pierre Gasly.
- Isack Hadjar for AlphaTauri in place of Yuki Tsunoda.

Bearman, Vesti and Hadjar made their Formula One practice debut.

=== Tyre choices ===
Tyre supplier Pirelli brought the C3, C4 and C5 tyre compounds (designated hard, medium, and soft, respectively), which are three softest compounds in their dry tyre range, for teams to use at the event. The previous iteration of the race had used compounds that were one step harder. Pirelli also provided two sets per driver of an experimental C4 compound that was trialed during the first two free practice sessions.

== Practice ==
Three free practice sessions were held for the event. The first free practice session was held on 27 October 2023, at 12:30 local time (UTC−6). Max Verstappen topped the session ahead of Alexander Albon and Sergio Pérez. The second free practice session was held on 27 October 2023, at 16:00. Max Verstappen topped the session ahead of Lando Norris and Charles Leclerc. The third free practice session was held on 28 October 2023, at 11:30. Max Verstappen topped the session ahead of Alexander Albon and Sergio Pérez.

== Qualifying ==
Qualifying was held on 28 October 2023, at 15:00 local time (UTC−6).

=== Qualifying report ===
Charles Leclerc took pole position ahead of his teammate Carlos Sainz Jr. and Max Verstappen. Verstappen, Lewis Hamilton and teammate George Russell were all investigated for impeding, but no penalties were given to them.

Fernando Alonso spun in Q1, bringing out a yellow flag in the first sector. Logan Sargeant could not set a lap time; he joined Lando Norris, Lance Stroll, Kevin Magnussen, and Esteban Ocon in exiting after the first part of the session. Pierre Gasly, Nico Hülkenberg, Alonso, Albon, and Yuki Tsunoda were knocked out of the second session. Alexander Albon had lap times deleted due to track limits, so Zhou Guanyu appeared in Q3.

Daniel Ricciardo qualified in fourth place, the AlphaTauri team's highest qualification of the season. The Ferrari drivers took a front row lockout, with Leclerc claiming pole position.

=== Qualifying classification ===
Pos.	No.	Driver	Constructor	Qualifying times			Final grid
Pos.	No.	Driver	Constructor	Q1	Q2	Q3	Final grid
1	16	(Monaco) Charles Leclerc	Ferrari	1:18.401	1:17.901	1:17.166	1
2	55	(Spain) Carlos Sainz Jr.	Ferrari	1:18.755	1:18.382	1:17.233	2
3	1	(Netherlands) Max Verstappen	Red Bull Racing-Honda RBPT	1:18.099	1:17.625	1:17.263	3
4	3	(Australia) Daniel Ricciardo	AlphaTauri-Honda RBPT	1:18.341	1:17.706	1:17.382	4
5	11	(Mexico) Sergio Pérez	Red Bull Racing-Honda RBPT	1:18.553	1:18.124	1:17.423	5
6	44	(United Kingdom) Lewis Hamilton	Mercedes	1:18.677	1:17.571	1:17.454	6
7	81	(Australia) Oscar Piastri	McLaren-Mercedes	1:18.241	1:17.874	1:17.623	7
8	63	(United Kingdom) George Russell	Mercedes	1:18.893	1:17.673	1:17.674	8
9	77	(Finland) Valtteri Bottas	Alfa Romeo-Ferrari	1:18.429	1:18.016	1:18.032	9
10	24	(China) Zhou Guanyu	Alfa Romeo-Ferrari	1:19.016	1:18.440	1:18.050	10
11	10	(France) Pierre Gasly	Alpine-Renault	1:18.945	1:18.521	N/A	11
12	27	(Germany) Nico Hülkenberg	Haas-Ferrari	1:18.969	1:18.524	N/A	12
13	14	(Spain) Fernando Alonso	Aston Martin Aramco-Mercedes	1:18.848	1:18.738	N/A	13
14	23	(Thailand) Alexander Albon	Williams-Mercedes	1:18.828	1:19.147	N/A	14
15	22	(Japan) Yuki Tsunoda	AlphaTauri-Honda RBPT	1:18.890	No time	N/A	18^{a}
16	31	(France) Esteban Ocon	Alpine-Renault	1:19.080	N/A	N/A	15
17	20	(Denmark) Kevin Magnussen	Haas-Ferrari	1:19.163	N/A	N/A	16
18	18	(Canada) Lance Stroll	Aston Martin Aramco-Mercedes	1:19.227	N/A	N/A	PL^{b}
19	4	(United Kingdom) Lando Norris	McLaren-Mercedes	1:21.554	N/A	N/A	17
107% time: 1:23.565
—	2	(United States) Logan Sargeant	Williams-Mercedes	No time	N/A	N/A	19^{c}

Notes

- ^a – Yuki Tsunoda was required to start the race from the back of the grid for exceeding his quota of power units elements and gearbox components.
- ^b – Lance Stroll qualified 18th, but he was required to start the race from the pit lane as elements of different specifications from the ones originally used were installed on his car during parc fermé conditions.
- ^c – Logan Sargeant failed to set a time during qualifying. He was permitted to race at the stewards' discretion. He also received a 10-place grid penalty for overtaking under yellow flag conditions in Q1. He gained a position following Lance Stroll's penalty.

== Race ==
The race was held on 29 October 2023, at 14:00 local time (UTC−6), and was run for 71 laps.

=== Race report ===
Max Verstappen won the race, his record-setting sixteenth win in a season, ahead of Lewis Hamilton in second and polesitter Charles Leclerc in third. Five retirements occurred during the race. On the first turn of the first lap, Sergio Pérez turned into Leclerc, resulting in Pérez's retirement and damage to Leclerc's endplate. On lap 5 Leclerc's endplate came off at turn 1 which led to a short virtual safety car (VSC) period in order to allow for the marshals to remove the debris from the circuit safely. On lap 33, Kevin Magnussen had a left rear suspension failure, leading to a heavy crash at turn 9 which left his car a smoldering wreck and initially brought out the safety car. One lap later, the red flag was brought out to allow marshals to repair a section of the barrier. Fernando Alonso withdrew due to damage in lap 47, with his Aston Martin teammate Lance Stroll later also being forced to retire after a collision with Valtteri Bottas. Logan Sargeant had an issue with his fuel pump, forcing him to retire on the final lap.

Starting seventeenth, Lando Norris gained twelve places to finish in fifth. Daniel Ricciardo finished in seventh, marking the AlphaTauri team's highest finish for the season. This result moved AlphaTauri from last to eighth in the Constructors Championship: 4 points ahead of Haas and level with Alfa Romeo.

After the lap-one crash between Pérez and Leclerc, a fan started an altercation between other fans. The instigator was ejected from the venue and given a lifetime ban.

=== Race classification ===
Pos.	No.	Driver	Constructor	Laps	Time/Retired	Grid	Points
1	1	(Netherlands) Max Verstappen	Red Bull Racing-Honda RBPT	71	2:02:30.814	3	25
2	44	(United Kingdom) Lewis Hamilton	Mercedes	71	+13.875	6	19^{a}
3	16	(Monaco) Charles Leclerc	Ferrari	71	+23.124	1	15
4	55	(Spain) Carlos Sainz Jr.	Ferrari	71	+27.154	2	12
5	4	(United Kingdom) Lando Norris	McLaren-Mercedes	71	+33.266	17	10
6	63	(United Kingdom) George Russell	Mercedes	71	+41.020	8	8
7	3	(Australia) Daniel Ricciardo	AlphaTauri-Honda RBPT	71	+41.570	4	6
8	81	(Australia) Oscar Piastri	McLaren-Mercedes	71	+43.104	7	4
9	23	(Thailand) Alexander Albon	Williams-Mercedes	71	+48.573	14	2
10	31	(France) Esteban Ocon	Alpine-Renault	71	+1:02.879	15	1
11	10	(France) Pierre Gasly	Alpine-Renault	71	+1:06.208	11	
12	22	(Japan) Yuki Tsunoda	AlphaTauri-Honda RBPT	71	+1:18.982	18	
13	27	(Germany) Nico Hülkenberg	Haas-Ferrari	71	+1:20.309	12	
14	24	(China) Zhou Guanyu	Alfa Romeo-Ferrari	71	+1:21.676	10	
15	77	(Finland) Valtteri Bottas	Alfa Romeo-Ferrari	71	+1:25.597^{b}	9	
16^{c}	2	(United States) Logan Sargeant	Williams-Mercedes	70	Fuel pump	19	
17^{c}	18	(Canada) Lance Stroll	Aston Martin Aramco-Mercedes	66	Collision damage	PL	
Ret	14	(Spain) Fernando Alonso	Aston Martin Aramco-Mercedes	47	Collision damage	13	
Ret	20	(Denmark) Kevin Magnussen	Haas-Ferrari	31	Suspension/Accident	16	
Ret	11	(Mexico) Sergio Pérez	Red Bull Racing-Honda RBPT	1	Collision damage	5	
Fastest lap: (United Kingdom) Lewis Hamilton (Mercedes) – 1:21.334 (lap 71)

Notes

- ^a – Includes one point for fastest lap.
- ^b – Valtteri Bottas finished 14th on track, but he received a post-race five-second time penalty for causing a collision with Lance Stroll.
- ^c – Logan Sargeant and Lance Stroll were classified as they completed more than 90% of the race distance.

== Championship standings after the race ==
Drivers' Championship standings

	Pos.	Driver	Points
	1	(Netherlands) **Max Verstappen**	491
	2	(Mexico) Sergio Pérez	240
	3	(United Kingdom) Lewis Hamilton	220
1	4	(Spain) Carlos Sainz Jr.	183
1	5	(Spain) Fernando Alonso	183

Constructors' Championship standings

Pos.	Constructor	Points
1	(Austria) **Red Bull Racing-Honda RBPT**	731
2	(Germany) Mercedes	371
3	(Italy) Ferrari	349
4	(United Kingdom) McLaren-Mercedes	256
5	(United Kingdom) Aston Martin Aramco-Mercedes	236

- Note: Only the top five positions are included for both sets of standings.
- Competitors in bold are the 2023 World Champions.

Previous race: 2023 United States Grand Prix	FIA Formula One World Championship; 2023 season	Next race: 2023 São Paulo Grand Prix
Previous race: 2022 Mexico City Grand Prix	Mexico City Grand Prix	Next race: 2024 Mexico City Grand Prix
