= Andrew Shovlin =

British engineer (born 1973)

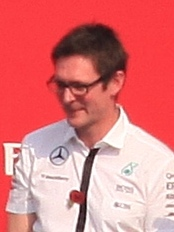
- Shovlin on the 2015 Mexican Grand Prix podium.
- Born: 1 November 1973 (age 52)
- Other names: Shov
- Citizenship: British
- Occupation: Engineer
- Employer: Mercedes-AMG Petronas F1
- Known for: Formula One engineer
- Title: Trackside engineering director

Andrew Shovlin (born 1 November 1973) is a British Formula One engineer. He is the trackside engineering director at the Mercedes-AMG Petronas Formula One team.

== Career ==
Shovlin graduated from Leeds University in 1998, obtaining a BEng in Mechanical Engineering, followed by a PhD in Vehicle Dynamics and Control. Shovlin started his career with BAR in 1999. In 2004–2009, Shovlin worked for BAR, and later Honda and Brawn GP as race engineer to Jenson Button. In 2010, he was appointed as race engineer for Michael Schumacher at Mercedes GP. The following year, he was promoted to the position of track engineering director, a role he continues to hold. In this capacity, Shovlin is responsible for maximizing the performance of both cars during race weekends. He collaborates closely with engineering teams on both sides of the Mercedes garage and coordinates with performance groups in Brackley to ensure that both cars receive the best available information and support.
