= 2021 Mexico City Grand Prix =

18th round of the 2021 Formula One season

Race 18 of 22 in the 2021 Formula One World Championship
← Previous race	Next race →

Race details
- Date: 7 November 2021
- Official name: Formula 1 Gran Premio de la Ciudad de México 2021
- Location: Autódromo Hermanos Rodríguez, Mexico City, Mexico
- Course: Permanent racing facility
- Course length: 4.304 km (2.674 miles)
- Distance: 71 laps, 305.354 km (189.738 miles)
- Weather: Sunny
- Attendance: 371,000

Pole position
Driver	(Finland) Valtteri Bottas	Mercedes
- Time: 1:15.875

Fastest lap
Driver	(Finland) Valtteri Bottas	Mercedes
- Time: 1:17.774 on lap 69 (lap record)

Podium
First	(Netherlands) Max Verstappen	Red Bull Racing-Honda
Second	(United Kingdom) Lewis Hamilton	Mercedes
Third	(Mexico) Sergio Pérez	Red Bull Racing-Honda

The 2021 Mexico City Grand Prix (officially known as the Formula 1 Heineken Gran Premio de la Ciudad de México 2021 due to sponsorship reasons) was a Formula One motor race, held on 7 November 2021 at the Autódromo Hermanos Rodríguez in Mexico City. The race was the 18th round of the 2021 Formula One World Championship and marked the 21st edition of the Mexican Grand Prix, which was run under the name Mexico City Grand Prix for the first time, acknowledging the sponsorship support of the government of Mexico City.

The race was won by Max Verstappen followed by Lewis Hamilton and Sergio Pérez. Kimi Räikkönen scored his final F1 career points in this race when he finished in 8th place whilst driving for Alfa Romeo.

== Background ==
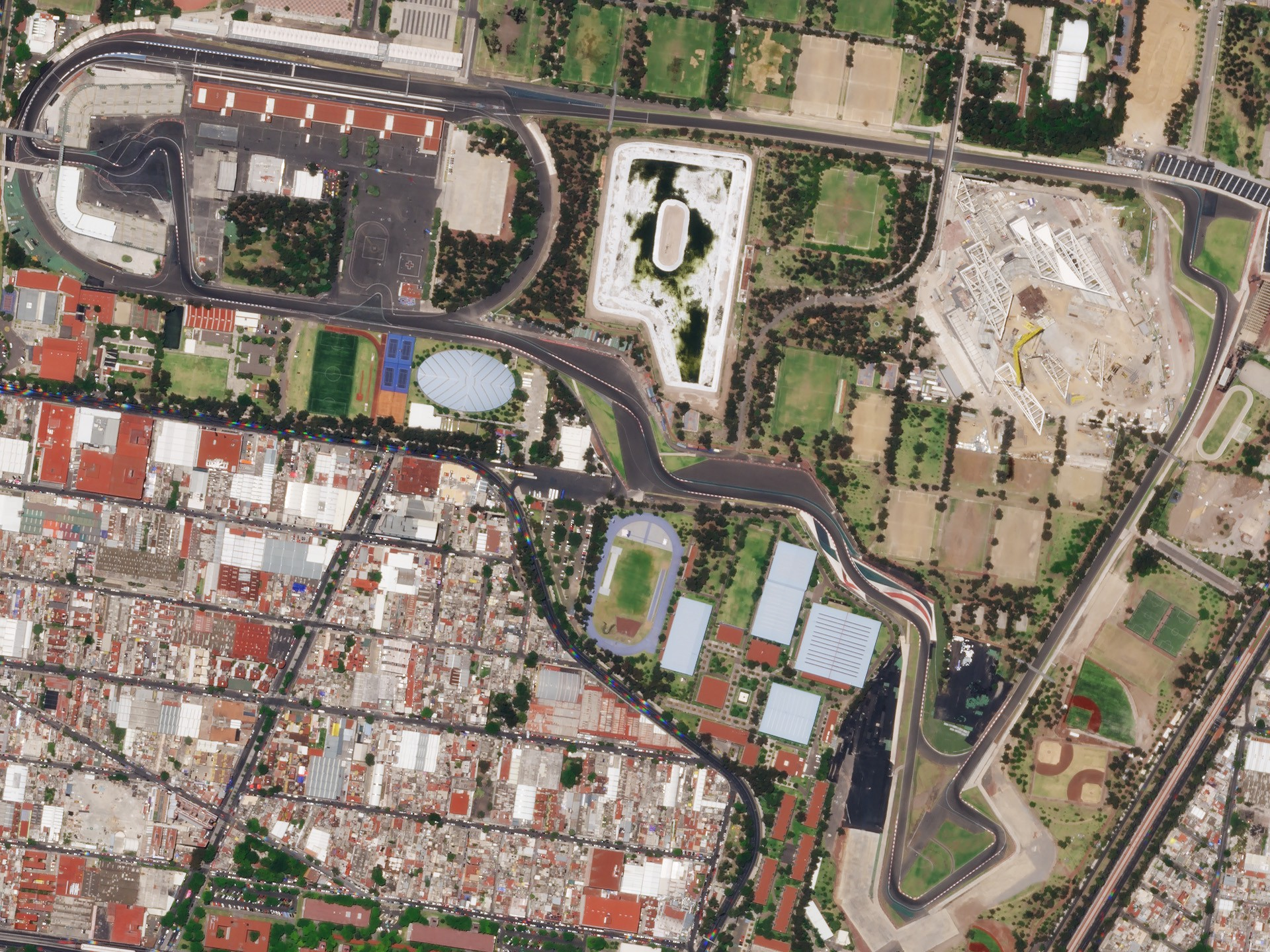
Satellite view of the circuit, as it appeared in 2018

The race marked its debut in the Formula One Championship calendar under the name Mexico City Grand Prix. On 8 August 2019, it was announced that the Mexican Grand Prix would remain on the calendar until 2022, though it would be renamed to Mexico City Grand Prix starting in 2020, in order to emphasize the support from the government of Mexico City. The edition was called off due to the COVID-19 pandemic. The 2021 race was originally to take place on 31 October, but was moved a week later due to the reduction of the overall number of Grands Prix in the calendar, from 23 to 22. This was the twenty-first World Championship Grand Prix held in Mexico.

=== Championship standings before the race ===
After winning in the preceding United States Grand Prix, Max Verstappen led the Drivers' Championship by 12 points: Verstappen with 287.5 and Lewis Hamilton with 275.5. Behind them, Valtteri Bottas was in third place with 185 points. Sergio Pérez trailed him by 35 points, and Lando Norris trailed Pérez by 1 point. In the Constructors' Championship, Mercedes led Red Bull Racing by 23 points. Behind them, third-placed McLaren led fourth-placed Ferrari by 4.5 points with 254 points, with Alpine a distant fifth with 104 points.

=== Entrants ===
The drivers and teams were the same as the season entry list with no additional stand-in drivers for the race.

=== Tyre choices ===
Sole tyre supplier Pirelli allocated the C2, C3, and C4 compounds of tyre to be used in the race.

== Practice ==
The weekend featured three practice sessions, each lasting one hour. The first practice session started at 11:30 local time (UTC−06:00) on 5 November, and ended with Valtteri Bottas fastest for Mercedes, ahead of teammate Lewis Hamilton and Red Bull driver Max Verstappen. The second practice session started at 15:00 local time, also on 5 November, and ended with Verstappen fastest ahead of Bottas and Hamilton. The third and final practice session started at 11:00 on 6 November with the Red Bulls of Sergio Pérez and Verstappen fastest, followed by the two Mercedes.

== Qualifying ==
Qualifying started at 14:00 local time on 6 November.

=== Qualifying classification ===
Pos.	No.	Driver	Constructor	Qualifying times			Final grid
Pos.	No.	Driver	Constructor	Q1	Q2	Q3	Final grid
1	77	(Finland) Valtteri Bottas	Mercedes	1:16.727	1:16.864	1:15.875	1
2	44	(United Kingdom) Lewis Hamilton	Mercedes	1:17.207	1:16.474	1:16.020	2
3	33	(Netherlands) Max Verstappen	Red Bull Racing-Honda	1:16.788	1:16.483	1:16.225	3
4	11	(Mexico) Sergio Pérez	Red Bull Racing-Honda	1:17.003	1:17.055	1:16.343	4
5	10	(France) Pierre Gasly	AlphaTauri-Honda	1:16.908	1:16.955	1:16.456	5
6	55	(Spain) Carlos Sainz Jr.	Ferrari	1:17.517	1:17.248	1:16.761	6
7	3	(Australia) Daniel Ricciardo	McLaren-Mercedes	1:17.719	1:17.092	1:16.763	7
8	16	(Monaco) Charles Leclerc	Ferrari	1:16.748	1:17.034	1:16.837	8
9	22	(Japan) Yuki Tsunoda	AlphaTauri-Honda	1:17.330	1:16.701	1:17.158	17^{1}
10	4	(United Kingdom) Lando Norris	McLaren-Mercedes	1:17.569	1:17.473	1:36.830	18^{2}
11	5	(Germany) Sebastian Vettel	Aston Martin-Mercedes	1:17.502	1:17.746	N/A	9
12	7	(Finland) Kimi Räikkönen	Alfa Romeo Racing-Ferrari	1:17.606	1:17.958	N/A	10
13	63	(United Kingdom) George Russell	Williams-Mercedes	1:17.958	1:18.172	N/A	16^{3}
14	99	(Italy) Antonio Giovinazzi	Alfa Romeo Racing-Ferrari	1:17.897	1:18.290	N/A	11
15	31	(France) Esteban Ocon	Alpine-Renault	1:18.126	1:18.405	N/A	19^{4}
16	14	(Spain) Fernando Alonso	Alpine-Renault	1:18.452	N/A	N/A	12
17	6	(Canada) Nicholas Latifi	Williams-Mercedes	1:18.756	N/A	N/A	13
18	47	(Germany) Mick Schumacher	Haas-Ferrari	1:18.858	N/A	N/A	14
19	9	(Russian Automobile Federation) Nikita Mazepin (Note: Nikita Mazepin is Russian, but he competed as a neutral competitor using the designation RAF (Russian Automobile Federation), as the Court of Arbitration for Sport upheld a ban on Russia competing at World Championships. The ban was implemented by the World Anti-Doping Agency in response to the state-sponsored doping program of Russian athletes.)	Haas-Ferrari	1:19.303	N/A	N/A	15
20	18	(Canada) Lance Stroll	Aston Martin-Mercedes	1:20.873	N/A	N/A	20^{5}
107% time: 1:22.097

Notes

- ^1 – Yuki Tsunoda was required to start the race from the back of the grid for exceeding his quota of power unit elements.
- ^2 – Lando Norris was required to start the race from the back of the grid for exceeding his quota of power unit elements.
- ^3 – George Russell received a five-place grid penalty for an unscheduled gearbox change.
- ^4 – Esteban Ocon was required to start the race from the back of the grid for exceeding his quota of power unit elements.
- ^5 – Lance Stroll was required to start the race from the back of the grid for exceeding his quota of power unit elements. He also received a five-place grid penalty for an unscheduled gearbox change. The penalty made no difference as he was already due to start from the last position.

== Race ==
The race started at 13:00 local time on 7 November. Valtteri Bottas started the race from pole position but was overtaken at the first corner by Max Verstappen. Bottas was then hit by Daniel Ricciardo from behind at the next corner with the stewards deciding neither driver was to blame for the incident. This put both drivers at the back of the field with neither scoring any points at this race.

Max Verstappen was leading for most of the race with Sergio Perez taking the lead for a short while, during the period that Verstappen had pitted and he had not. Perez became the first Mexican driver to lead his home Grand Prix. Lewis Hamilton was in second with Verstappen having a clear lead over him. Hamilton and Perez were close towards the end with Perez not far from trying to get past him. Hamilton managed to keep second place and Perez came home to finish third. By finishing 3rd, Pérez became the first Mexican driver to get a podium at home.

Valtteri Bottas took the fastest lap of the race, but did not receive the point for it as he finished outside the top ten. In line with the regulations, the fastest lap point was not redistributed.

=== Race classification ===
Pos.	No.	Driver	Constructor	Laps	Time/Retired	Grid	Points
1	33	(Netherlands) Max Verstappen	Red Bull Racing-Honda	71	1:38:39.086	3	25
2	44	(United Kingdom) Lewis Hamilton	Mercedes	71	+16.555	2	18
3	11	(Mexico) Sergio Pérez	Red Bull Racing-Honda	71	+17.752	4	15
4	10	(France) Pierre Gasly	AlphaTauri-Honda	71	+1:03.845	5	12
5	16	(Monaco) Charles Leclerc	Ferrari	71	+1:21.037	8	10
6	55	(Spain) Carlos Sainz Jr.	Ferrari	70	+1 lap	6	8
7	5	(Germany) Sebastian Vettel	Aston Martin-Mercedes	70	+1 lap	9	6
8	7	(Finland) Kimi Räikkönen	Alfa Romeo Racing-Ferrari	70	+1 lap	10	4
9	14	(Spain) Fernando Alonso	Alpine-Renault	70	+1 lap	12	2
10	4	(United Kingdom) Lando Norris	McLaren-Mercedes	70	+1 lap	18	1
11	99	(Italy) Antonio Giovinazzi	Alfa Romeo Racing-Ferrari	70	+1 lap	11	
12	3	(Australia) Daniel Ricciardo	McLaren-Mercedes	70	+1 lap	7	
13	31	(France) Esteban Ocon	Alpine-Renault	70	+1 lap	19	
14	18	(Canada) Lance Stroll	Aston Martin-Mercedes	69	+2 laps	20	
15	77	(Finland) Valtteri Bottas	Mercedes	69	+2 laps	1	
16	63	(United Kingdom) George Russell	Williams-Mercedes	69	+2 laps	16	
17	6	(Canada) Nicholas Latifi	Williams-Mercedes	69	+2 laps	13	
18	9	(Russian Automobile Federation) Nikita Mazepin	Haas-Ferrari	68	+3 laps	15	
Ret	47	(Germany) Mick Schumacher	Haas-Ferrari	0	Collision	14	
Ret	22	(Japan) Yuki Tsunoda	AlphaTauri-Honda	0	Collision	17	
Fastest lap: (Finland) Valtteri Bottas (Mercedes) – 1:17.774 (lap 69)

== Championship standings after the race ==
Drivers' Championship standings

	Pos.	Driver	Points
Unchanged	1	(Netherlands) Max Verstappen*	312.5
Unchanged	2	(United Kingdom) Lewis Hamilton*	293.5
Unchanged	3	(Finland) Valtteri Bottas	185
Unchanged	4	(Mexico) Sergio Pérez	165
Unchanged	5	(United Kingdom) Lando Norris	150

Constructors' Championship standings

	Pos.	Constructor	Points
Unchanged	1	(Germany) Mercedes*	478.5
Unchanged	2	(Austria) Red Bull Racing-Honda*	477.5
1	3	(Italy) Ferrari	268.5
1	4	(United Kingdom) McLaren-Mercedes	255
Unchanged	5	(France) Alpine-Renault	106

- Note: Only the top five positions are included for both sets of standings.
- Bold text and an asterisk indicates competitors who still had a theoretical chance of becoming World Champion.

== Notes ==
Previous race: 2021 United States Grand Prix	FIA Formula One World Championship; 2021 season	Next race: 2021 São Paulo Grand Prix
Previous race: 2019 Mexican Grand Prix	Mexico City Grand Prix	Next race: 2022 Mexico City Grand Prix
