= 2024 Mexico City Grand Prix =

Twentieth round of the 2024 F1 season

Race 20 of 24 in the 2024 Formula One World Championship
← Previous race	Next race →
- Layout of the Autódromo Hermanos Rodríguez

Race details
- Date: 27 October 2024
- Official name: Formula 1 Gran Premio de la Ciudad de México 2024
- Location: Autódromo Hermanos Rodríguez; Mexico City, Mexico
- Course: Permanent racing facility
- Course length: 4.304 km (2.674 miles)
- Distance: 71 laps, 305.354 km (189.738 miles)
- Weather: Partly cloudy
- Attendance: 404,958

Pole position
Driver	(Spain) Carlos Sainz Jr.	Ferrari
- Time: 1:15.946

Fastest lap
Driver	(Monaco) Charles Leclerc	Ferrari
- Time: 1:18.336 on lap 71

Podium
First	(Spain) Carlos Sainz Jr.	Ferrari
Second	(United Kingdom) Lando Norris	McLaren-Mercedes
Third	(Monaco) Charles Leclerc	Ferrari

The 2024 Mexico City Grand Prix (officially known as the Formula 1 Gran Premio de la Ciudad de México 2024) was a Formula One motor race held on 27 October 2024 at the Autódromo Hermanos Rodríguez in Mexico City, Mexico. It was the twentieth round of the 2024 Formula One World Championship. Carlos Sainz Jr. of Ferrari took pole position, and went on to win the race ahead of Lando Norris of McLaren and teammate Charles Leclerc. Sainz's win was the fourth of his career, his final win with Ferrari, and his first in Mexico City. Both Ferrari cars finished on the podium, which allowed the team to take second ahead of Red Bull Racing in the Constructors' Championship.

== Background ==
The event was held at the Autódromo Hermanos Rodríguez in Mexico City for the 24th time in the circuit's history, having previously held twenty editions of the Mexican Grand Prix, across the weekend of 25–27 October. The Grand Prix was the twentieth round of the 2024 Formula One World Championship and the fourth held under the name of the Mexico City Grand Prix, having previously been titled the Mexican Grand Prix.

=== Championship standings before the race ===
Going into the weekend, Max Verstappen led the Drivers' Championship with 354 points, 57 points ahead of Lando Norris in second, and 79 ahead of Charles Leclerc in third. McLaren, holding 544 points, entered this round as the leader of the Constructors' Championship from Red Bull Racing and Ferrari, who were second and third with 504 and 496 points, respectively.

=== Entrants ===
The drivers and teams were same as the season entry list with two exceptions: Franco Colapinto, who replaced Logan Sargeant at Williams from the Italian Grand Prix onwards, and Liam Lawson, who replaced Daniel Ricciardo at RB from the preceding United States Grand Prix. During the first practice session, five teams fielded alternate drivers who had not raced in more than two Grands Prix, as required by the Formula One regulations:

- Robert Shwartzman for Sauber in place of Zhou Guanyu.
- Felipe Drugovich for Aston Martin in place of Fernando Alonso.
- Patricio O'Ward for McLaren in place of Lando Norris.
- Kimi Antonelli for Mercedes in place of Lewis Hamilton.
- Oliver Bearman for Ferrari in place of Charles Leclerc.

Alonso made his 400th Grand Prix entry, making him the first driver to reach that milestone.

=== Tyre choices ===
Tyre supplier Pirelli brought the C3, C4, and C5 tyre compounds (the softest three in their range) designated hard, medium, and soft, respectively, for teams to use at the event. The second free practice session was dedicated to validating the softer compounds in the 2025 range that would be designated C4, C5, and C6.

=== Track changes ===
The DRS zone leading in to turn 1 was shortened by 75 metres (246 ft).

== Practice ==
Three free practice sessions were held for the event. The first free practice session was held on 25 October 2024, at 12:30 local time (UTC–6), and was topped by George Russell of Mercedes ahead of Carlos Sainz Jr. of Ferrari and Yuki Tsunoda of RB. The session was red-flagged twice: the first time for debris on track, of which Kimi Antonelli of Mercedes hit, damaging his car's floor, and the second time for an accident involving Alexander Albon of Williams and Oliver Bearman of Ferrari. The second free practice session was held on the same day, at 16:00 local time, and was topped by Sainz ahead of Oscar Piastri of McLaren and Tsunoda. The session, which was dedicated to Pirelli tyre tests with new 2025 compounds, was red-flagged due to Russell's heavy crash. The third practice session was held on 26 October 2024, at 11:30 local time, and was topped by Piastri ahead of his teammate Lando Norris and Sainz.

== Qualifying ==
Qualifying was held on 26 October 2024, at 15:00 local time (UTC−6).

=== Qualifying classification ===
Pos.	No.	Driver	Constructor	Qualifying times			Final grid
Pos.	No.	Driver	Constructor	Q1	Q2	Q3	Final grid
1	55	(Spain) Carlos Sainz Jr.	Ferrari	1:16.778	1:16.515	1:15.946	1
2	1	(Netherlands) Max Verstappen	Red Bull Racing-Honda RBPT	1:16.803	1:16.514	1:16.171	2
3	4	(United Kingdom) Lando Norris	McLaren-Mercedes	1:16.505	1:16.301	1:16.260	3
4	16	(Monaco) Charles Leclerc	Ferrari	1:16.972	1:16.641	1:16.265	4
5	63	(United Kingdom) George Russell	Mercedes	1:17.194	1:16.937	1:16.356	5
6	44	(United Kingdom) Lewis Hamilton	Mercedes	1:17.306	1:16.973	1:16.651	6
7	20	(Denmark) Kevin Magnussen	Haas-Ferrari	1:17.125	1:17.003	1:16.886	7
8	10	(France) Pierre Gasly	Alpine-Renault	1:17.149	1:17.048	1:16.892	8
9	23	(Thailand) Alexander Albon	Williams-Mercedes	1:17.189	1:16.988	1:17.065	9
10	27	(Germany) Nico Hülkenberg	Haas-Ferrari	1:17.186	1:16.995	1:17.365	10
11	22	(Japan) Yuki Tsunoda	RB-Honda RBPT	1:17.182	1:17.129	N/A	11
12	30	(New Zealand) Liam Lawson	RB-Honda RBPT	1:17.380	1:17.162	N/A	12
13	14	(Spain) Fernando Alonso	Aston Martin Aramco-Mercedes	1:17.307	1:17.168	N/A	13
14	18	(Canada) Lance Stroll	Aston Martin Aramco-Mercedes	1:17.407	1:17.294	N/A	14
15	77	(Finland) Valtteri Bottas	Kick Sauber-Ferrari	1:17.393	1:17.817	N/A	15
16	43	(Argentina) Franco Colapinto	Williams-Mercedes	1:17.558	N/A	N/A	16
17	81	(Australia) Oscar Piastri	McLaren-Mercedes	1:17.597	N/A	N/A	17
18	11	(Mexico) Sergio Pérez	Red Bull Racing-Honda RBPT	1:17.611	N/A	N/A	18
19	31	(France) Esteban Ocon	Alpine-Renault	1:17.617	N/A	N/A	PL^{a}
20	24	(China) Zhou Guanyu	Kick Sauber-Ferrari	1:18.072	N/A	N/A	19
107% time: 1:21.860

Notes

- ^a – Esteban Ocon qualified 19th, but was required to start the race from the pit lane for replacing power unit elements without the approval of the technical delegate during parc fermé.

== Race ==
The race was held on 27 October 2024, at 14:00 local time (UTC−6), and was run for 71 laps.

=== Race report ===
As soon as the race began, a collision between Yuki Tsunoda and Alexander Albon was observed which resulted in both drivers retiring. Albon had started ninth while Tsunoda sat on the grid in 11th behind Albon and Nico Hülkenberg. Albon was sandwiched between Pierre Gasly, who had started eighth, and Tsunoda, causing his car's hub wheel to come off, leaving debris on the track. Carlos Sainz Jr. and Max Verstappen battled for the lead at the start, but Verstappen lost traction of his car and forced Sainz to the grass, of which no further action was taken. Sainz successfully overtook Verstappen on lap 9. However, on lap 10, both Verstappen and championship rival Lando Norris clashed: Verstappen pushed Norris to the grass twice at turns 4 and 7, in a similar move to what he did with Sainz. Verstappen was issued two separate ten-second penalties for leaving the track and gaining an advantage, allowing Charles Leclerc to take second. Verstappen served his penalty during lap 27 on his pit stop. His teammate, Sergio Pérez, endured a sub-par home race: after being penalised for a false start, he came across Liam Lawson, a driver for his sister team RB. As they battled for position, they collided, causing damage to Pérez's sidepod. Lawson stayed ahead and overtook Pérez while performing a middle finger, which resulted in post-race remonstrations from Red Bull team principal Christian Horner. Pérez finished last out of all the finishing cars.

Leclerc, who had been running in second, made a mistake at the last corner on lap 63, allowing Norris to take second. Three laps later, both Mercedes drivers battled for fourth, with Lewis Hamilton taking the place ahead of his teammate, George Russell.

In the closing laps, a collision between Franco Colapinto and Lawson resulted in Colapinto received a ten-second time penalty for causing the collision. Lawson received damage to his left-front wing endplate. Sainz, who had been running in the lead since lap 9, won the race comfortably ahead of Norris and Leclerc, who took the fastest lap of the race. Sainz's win was his first since the Australian Grand Prix, and was the fourth of his career, allowing Ferrari to take second ahead of Red Bull Racing in the Constructors' Championship.

=== Race classification ===
Pos.	No.	Driver	Constructor	Laps	Time/Retired	Grid	Points
1	55	(Spain) Carlos Sainz Jr.	Ferrari	71	1:40:55.800	1	25
2	4	(United Kingdom) Lando Norris	McLaren-Mercedes	71	+4.705	3	18
3	16	(Monaco) Charles Leclerc	Ferrari	71	+34.387	4	16^{a}
4	44	(United Kingdom) Lewis Hamilton	Mercedes	71	+44.780	6	12
5	63	(United Kingdom) George Russell	Mercedes	71	+48.536	5	10
6	1	(Netherlands) Max Verstappen	Red Bull Racing-Honda RBPT	71	+59.558	2	8
7	20	(Denmark) Kevin Magnussen	Haas-Ferrari	71	+1:03.642	7	6
8	81	(Australia) Oscar Piastri	McLaren-Mercedes	71	+1:04.928	17	4
9	27	(Germany) Nico Hülkenberg	Haas-Ferrari	70	+1 lap	10	2
10	10	(France) Pierre Gasly	Alpine-Renault	70	+1 lap	8	1
11	18	(Canada) Lance Stroll	Aston Martin Aramco-Mercedes	70	+1 lap	14	
12	43	(Argentina) Franco Colapinto	Williams-Mercedes	70	+1 lap^{b}	16	
13	31	(France) Esteban Ocon	Alpine-Renault	70	+1 lap	PL	
14	77	(Finland) Valtteri Bottas	Kick Sauber-Ferrari	70	+1 lap	15	
15	24	(China) Zhou Guanyu	Kick Sauber-Ferrari	70	+1 lap	19	
16	30	(New Zealand) Liam Lawson	RB-Honda RBPT	70	+1 lap	12	
17	11	(Mexico) Sergio Pérez	Red Bull Racing-Honda RBPT	70	+1 lap	18	
Ret	14	(Spain) Fernando Alonso	Aston Martin Aramco-Mercedes	15	Brakes	13	
Ret	23	(Thailand) Alexander Albon	Williams-Mercedes	0	Collision	9	
Ret	22	(Japan) Yuki Tsunoda	RB-Honda RBPT	0	Collision	11	
Fastest lap: (Monaco) Charles Leclerc (Ferrari) – 1:18.336 (lap 71)

Notes

- ^a – Includes one point for fastest lap.
- ^b – Franco Colapinto received a ten-second time penalty for causing a collision with Liam Lawson. His final position was not affected by the penalty.

== Championship standings after the race ==
Drivers' Championship standings

Pos.	Driver	Points
1	(Netherlands) **Max Verstappen***	362
2	(United Kingdom) **Lando Norris***	315
3	(Monaco) **Charles Leclerc***	291
4	(Australia) **Oscar Piastri***	251
5	(Spain) Carlos Sainz Jr.	240

Constructors' Championship standings

	Pos.	Constructor	Points
	1	(United Kingdom) **McLaren-Mercedes***	566
1	2	(Italy) **Ferrari***	537
1	3	(Austria) **Red Bull Racing-Honda RBPT***	512
	4	(Germany) Mercedes	366
	5	(United Kingdom) Aston Martin Aramco-Mercedes	86

- Note: Only the top five positions are included for both sets of standings.
- Competitor marked in bold and with an asterisk still has a theoretical chance of becoming World Champion.

Previous race: 2024 United States Grand Prix	FIA Formula One World Championship; 2024 season	Next race: 2024 São Paulo Grand Prix
Previous race: 2023 Mexico City Grand Prix	Mexico City Grand Prix	Next race: 2025 Mexico City Grand Prix
