= 2022 Mexico City Grand Prix =

Twentieth round of the 2022 F1 season

Race 20 of 22 in the 2022 Formula One World Championship
← Previous race	Next race →
- Layout of the Autódromo Hermanos Rodríguez

Race details
- Date: 30 October 2022
- Official name: Formula 1 Gran Premio de la Ciudad de México 2022
- Location: Autódromo Hermanos Rodríguez; Mexico City, Mexico
- Course: Permanent racing facility
- Course length: 4.304 km (2.674 miles)
- Distance: 71 laps, 305.354 km (189.738 miles)
- Weather: Partly cloudy
- Attendance: 395,902

Pole position
Driver	(Netherlands) Max Verstappen	Red Bull Racing-RBPT
- Time: 1:17.775

Fastest lap
Driver	(United Kingdom) George Russell	Mercedes
- Time: 1:20.153 on lap 71

Podium
First	(Netherlands) Max Verstappen	Red Bull Racing-RBPT
Second	(United Kingdom) Lewis Hamilton	Mercedes
Third	(Mexico) Sergio Pérez	Red Bull Racing-RBPT

The 2022 Mexico City Grand Prix (officially known as the Formula 1 Gran Premio de la Ciudad de México 2022) was a Formula One motor race that was held on 30 October 2022 at the Autódromo Hermanos Rodríguez in Mexico City, Mexico. The race was the 20th round of the 2022 Formula One World Championship and marked the 22nd edition of the Mexican Grand Prix, which was run under the name Mexico City Grand Prix for the second time. It was won by defending champion Max Verstappen, who was followed by Lewis Hamilton in second and Sergio Pérez in third. By winning the race, Verstappen passed Jim Clark (three wins) for the most wins at Mexico.

== Background ==
The event was held across the weekend of the 28–30 October. It was the twentieth round of the 2022 Formula One World Championship.

=== Championship standings before the race ===
Going into the weekend, both the Drivers' and Constructors' titles had already been decided at the Japanese and United States Grands Prix, respectively. Max Verstappen led the Drivers' Championship with 124 points from Charles Leclerc, second, and 126 from teammate Sergio Pérez, third. Red Bull Racing led the Constructors' Championship from Ferrari by 187 points and Mercedes by 240 points.

=== Entrants ===
The drivers and teams were the same as the season entry list with no additional stand-in drivers for the race. Pietro Fittipaldi, Logan Sargeant, Liam Lawson and Nyck de Vries drove for Haas in place of Kevin Magnussen, for Williams in place of Alexander Albon, for AlphaTauri in place of Yuki Tsunoda, and for Mercedes in place of George Russell, respectively, during the first practice session. Jack Doohan drove for Alpine in place of Esteban Ocon in the same session, making his Formula One practice debut.

=== Tyre choices ===
Tyre supplier Pirelli brought the C2, C3, and C4 tyre compounds (designated hard, medium, and soft, respectively) for teams to use at the event.

=== Penalties ===
Aston Martin's Lance Stroll carried a three-place grid penalty for causing a collision with Fernando Alonso at the previous round, the United States Grand Prix.

== Qualifying ==
=== Qualifying classification ===
Pos.	No.	Driver	Constructor	Qualifying times			Final grid
Pos.	No.	Driver	Constructor	Q1	Q2	Q3	Final grid
1	1	(Netherlands) Max Verstappen	Red Bull Racing-RBPT	1:19.222	1:18.566	1:17.775	1
2	63	(United Kingdom) George Russell	Mercedes	1:19.583	1:18.565	1:18.079	2
3	44	(United Kingdom) Lewis Hamilton	Mercedes	1:19.169	1:18.552	1:18.084	3
4	11	(Mexico) Sergio Pérez	Red Bull Racing-RBPT	1:19.706	1:18.615	1:18.128	4
5	55	(Spain) Carlos Sainz Jr.	Ferrari	1:19.566	1:18.560	1:18.351	5
6	77	(Finland) Valtteri Bottas	Alfa Romeo-Ferrari	1:19.523	1:18.762	1:18.401	6
7	16	(Monaco) Charles Leclerc	Ferrari	1:19.505	1:19.109	1:18.555	7
8	4	(United Kingdom) Lando Norris	McLaren-Mercedes	1:19.857	1:19.119	1:18.721	8
9	14	(Spain) Fernando Alonso	Alpine-Renault	1:20.006	1:19.272	1:18.939	9
10	31	(France) Esteban Ocon	Alpine-Renault	1:19.945	1:19.081	1:19.010	10
11	3	(Australia) Daniel Ricciardo	McLaren-Mercedes	1:20.279	1:19.325	N/A	11
12	24	(China) Zhou Guanyu	Alfa Romeo-Ferrari	1:20.283	1:19.476	N/A	12
13	22	(Japan) Yuki Tsunoda	AlphaTauri-RBPT	1:19.907	1:19.589	N/A	13
14	10	(France) Pierre Gasly	AlphaTauri-RBPT	1:20.256	1:19.672	N/A	14
15	20	(Denmark) Kevin Magnussen	Haas-Ferrari	1:20.293	1:19.833	N/A	19^{a}
16	47	(Germany) Mick Schumacher	Haas-Ferrari	1:20.419^{b}	N/A	N/A	15
17	5	(Germany) Sebastian Vettel	Aston Martin Aramco-Mercedes	1:20.419^{b}	N/A	N/A	16
18	18	(Canada) Lance Stroll	Aston Martin Aramco-Mercedes	1:20.520	N/A	N/A	20^{c}
19	23	(Thailand) Alexander Albon	Williams-Mercedes	1:20.859	N/A	N/A	17
20	6	(Canada) Nicholas Latifi	Williams-Mercedes	1:21.167	N/A	N/A	18
107% time: 1:24.710

- ^a – Kevin Magnussen received a five-place grid penalty for exceeding his quota of power unit elements.
- ^b – Mick Schumacher and Sebastian Vettel set the identical lap time. Schumacher was classified ahead of Vettel as he set the lap earlier.
- ^c – Lance Stroll received a three-place grid penalty for causing a collision with Fernando Alonso at the previous round.

== Race ==
=== Race classification ===
Pos.	No.	Driver	Constructor	Laps	Time/Retired	Grid	Points
1	1	(Netherlands) Max Verstappen	Red Bull Racing-RBPT	71	1:38:36.729	1	25
2	44	(United Kingdom) Lewis Hamilton	Mercedes	71	+15.186	3	18
3	11	(Mexico) Sergio Pérez	Red Bull Racing-RBPT	71	+18.097	4	15
4	63	(United Kingdom) George Russell	Mercedes	71	+49.431	2	13^{a}
5	55	(Spain) Carlos Sainz Jr.	Ferrari	71	+58.123	5	10
6	16	(Monaco) Charles Leclerc	Ferrari	71	+1:08.774	7	8
7	3	(Australia) Daniel Ricciardo	McLaren-Mercedes	70	+1 lap^{b}	11	6
8	31	(France) Esteban Ocon	Alpine-Renault	70	+1 lap	10	4
9	4	(United Kingdom) Lando Norris	McLaren-Mercedes	70	+1 lap	8	2
10	77	(Finland) Valtteri Bottas	Alfa Romeo-Ferrari	70	+1 lap	6	1
11	10	(France) Pierre Gasly	AlphaTauri-RBPT	70	+1 lap	14	
12	23	(Thailand) Alexander Albon	Williams-Mercedes	70	+1 lap	17	
13	24	(China) Zhou Guanyu	Alfa Romeo-Ferrari	70	+1 lap	12	
14	5	(Germany) Sebastian Vettel	Aston Martin Aramco-Mercedes	70	+1 lap	16	
15	18	(Canada) Lance Stroll	Aston Martin Aramco-Mercedes	70	+1 lap	20	
16	47	(Germany) Mick Schumacher	Haas-Ferrari	70	+1 lap	15	
17	20	(Denmark) Kevin Magnussen	Haas-Ferrari	70	+1 lap	19	
18	6	(Canada) Nicholas Latifi	Williams-Mercedes	69	+2 laps	18	
19^{c}	14	(Spain) Fernando Alonso	Alpine-Renault	63	Engine	9	
Ret	22	(Japan) Yuki Tsunoda	AlphaTauri-RBPT	50	Collision damage	13	
Fastest lap: (United Kingdom) George Russell (Mercedes) – 1:20.153 (lap 71)
Source::

Notes

- ^a – Includes one point for fastest lap.
- ^b – Daniel Ricciardo received a ten-second time penalty for causing a collision with Yuki Tsunoda. His final position was not affected by the penalty.
- ^c – Fernando Alonso was classified as he completed more than 90% of the race distance.

== Championship standings after the race ==
Drivers' Championship standings

	Pos.	Driver	Points
	1	(Netherlands) **Max Verstappen**	416
1	2	(Mexico) Sergio Pérez	280
1	3	(Monaco) Charles Leclerc	275
	4	(United Kingdom) George Russell	231
1	5	(United Kingdom) Lewis Hamilton	216

Constructors' Championship standings

Pos.	Constructor	Points
1	(Austria) **Red Bull Racing-RBPT**	696
2	(Italy) Ferrari	487
3	(Germany) Mercedes	447
4	(France) Alpine-Renault	153
5	(United Kingdom) McLaren-Mercedes	146

- Note: Only the top five positions are included for both sets of standings.
- Competitors in bold are the 2022 world champions.

Previous race: 2022 United States Grand Prix	FIA Formula One World Championship; 2022 season	Next race: 2022 São Paulo Grand Prix
Previous race: 2021 Mexico City Grand Prix	Mexico City Grand Prix	Next race: 2023 Mexico City Grand Prix
