= 1962 Mexican Grand Prix =

- Non-championship race in the 1962 Formula One season

Race details
- Date: 4 November 1962
- Official name: I Gran Premio de Mexico
- Location: Magdalena Mixhuca, Mexico City
- Course: Permanent racing facility
- Course length: 5.000 km (3.107 miles)
- Distance: 60 laps, 300.000 km (186.411 miles)

Pole position
Driver	(United Kingdom) Jim Clark	Lotus-Climax
- Time: 2:00.1

Fastest lap
Driver	(United Kingdom) Jim Clark	Lotus-Climax
- Time: 1:57.6

Podium
First	(United Kingdom) Trevor Taylor; (United Kingdom) Jim Clark	Lotus-Climax
Second	(Australia) Jack Brabham	Brabham-Climax
Third	(United Kingdom) Innes Ireland	Lotus-Climax

The I Gran Premio de Mexico (or 1st Mexican Grand Prix) was held on 4 November 1962 at the Magdalena Mixhuca circuit, Mexico City. The race was a non-championship event run to Formula One rules and attracted a large entry, including many top teams and drivers. The race was run over 60 laps of the main circuit, and was eventually won by Jim Clark and Trevor Taylor, sharing a drive in a Lotus 25. The race meeting was marred by the death during practice of local driving prodigy Ricardo Rodríguez. The circuit would later be renamed the Autódromo Hermanos Rodríguez to honour him and his brother Pedro.

== Race summary ==
Pole-sitter Clark suffered a flat battery, so his Lotus 25-Climax got a replacement, but still failed to start; mechanics gave it a push start to get the engine going. However, due to a lack of communication between the starting officials, the start flag was waved while marshals were still on the track. For John Surtees, the delay caused a cylinder to burn out and his race was over before it even started. The race stewards decided the push start had been illegal (despite it being done by race officials) and black-flagged Clark's car (leaking oil in addition, so unlikely to survive full distance in any case) on lap 10.

Clark took over the second works Lotus of Lotus team-mate, Trevor Taylor, during a pit stop, dropping him to third, behind Jack Brabham's Brabham and Bruce McLaren in the Cooper. The Scot put in a superb drive to claw back the 57 second deficit on the leaders, passing both with over one third of the race distance still remaining. McLaren's engine blew after half-distance, and as the Brabham was also having trouble, Clark completed the remainder of the race with very little opposition, scoring an easy win. This would prove to be the final time that a Grand Prix victory would be shared by two drivers.

Also notable was the participation of German driver Wolfgang Seidel, who competed despite having had his FIA licence suspended over two months previously. The Porsche works team did not attend, Porsche having withdrawn from motor sport at the end of the 1962 World Championship season.

Despite the starting confusion, the race earned the Mexican Grand Prix full World Championship status from 1963, which it would retain until 1970.

== Results ==
Pos	Driver	Entrant	Constructor	Time/Retired	Qual
1	(United Kingdom) Trevor Taylor / Jim Clark	Team Lotus	Lotus-Climax	2:03:50.9	3
2	(Australia) Jack Brabham	Brabham Racing Organisation	Brabham-Climax	+ 1:01.9	7
3	(United Kingdom) Innes Ireland	UDT Laystall Racing Team	Lotus-Climax	+ 1 lap	2
4	(United States) Jim Hall	Jim Hall	Lotus-Climax	+ 1 lap	10
5	(United States) Masten Gregory	UDT Laystall Racing Team	Lotus-BRM	+ 1 lap	9
6	(United States) Rob Schroeder	John Mecom	Lotus-Climax	+ 3 laps	11
7	(Netherlands) Carel Godin de Beaufort	Ecurie Maarsbergen	Porsche	+ 3 laps	12
8	(United States) Homer Rader	Jim Hall	Lotus-Climax	+ 3 laps	14
9	(United States) Jay Chamberlain	Ecurie Excelsior	Lotus-Climax	+ 7 laps	16
Ret	(United States) Walt Hansgen	Walter Hansgen	Lotus-Climax	Ignition	13
Ret	(United States) Roger Penske	Dupont Team Zerex	Lotus-Climax	Gearbox	6
Ret	(New Zealand) Bruce McLaren	Cooper Car Company	Cooper-Climax	Engine	5
DSQ	(United Kingdom) Jim Clark	Team Lotus	Lotus-Climax	Push start	1
Ret	(United Kingdom) Roy Salvadori	Bowmaker-Yeoman Racing Team	Lola-Climax	Accident (Rear suspension)	8
Ret	(United States) Alan Connell	Alan Connell	Cooper-Climax	Engine	15
Ret	(Germany) Wolfgang Seidel	Autosport Team Wolfgang Seidel	Lotus-BRM	Gearbox	17
Ret	(United Kingdom) John Surtees	Bowmaker-Yeoman Racing Team	Lotus-Climax	Ignition	4
WD	(Mexico) Moisés Solana	Bowmaker-Yeoman Racing Team	Cooper-BRM	Car too slow	–
DNS	(Mexico) Ricardo Rodríguez	Rob Walker Racing Team	Lotus-Climax	Fatal accident	–
DNA	(United States) Dan Gurney	Porsche System Engineering	Porsche		
DNA	(Sweden) Jo Bonnier	Porsche System Engineering	Porsche		

- Moisés Solana withdrew from the event during practice, complaining that his car was too slow. His fastest recorded time was faster than those of Seidel, Connell, Rader, Chamberlain and Hansgen.

Previous race: 1962 International Gold Cup	Formula One non-championship races 1962 season	Next race: 1962 Rand Grand Prix
Previous race: None	Mexican Grand Prix	Next race: 1963 Mexican Grand Prix
