= 2016 Mexican Grand Prix =

Race 19 of 21 in the 2016 Formula One World Championship
| ← Previous race | Next race → |

Race details
- Date: 30 October 2016
- Official name: Formula 1 Gran Premio de México 2016
- Location: Autódromo Hermanos Rodríguez, Mexico City, Mexico
- Course: Permanent racing facility
- Course length: 4.304 km (2.674 miles)
- Distance: 71 laps, 305.354 km (189.738 miles)
- Weather: Sunny
- Attendance: 339,967 (Weekend) 135,026 (Race Day)

Pole position
| Driver | (United Kingdom) Lewis Hamilton | Mercedes |
- Time: 1:18.704

Fastest lap
| Driver | (Australia) Daniel Ricciardo | Red Bull Racing-TAG Heuer |
- Time: 1:21.134 on lap 53

Podium
| First | (United Kingdom) Lewis Hamilton | Mercedes |
| Second | (Germany) Nico Rosberg | Mercedes |
| Third | (Australia) Daniel Ricciardo | Red Bull Racing-TAG Heuer |

The 2016 Mexican Grand Prix (formally known as the Formula 1 Gran Premio de México 2016) was the Formula One motor race run on 30 October 2016 at the Autódromo Hermanos Rodríguez in Mexico City, the eighteenth Mexican Grand Prix, and the sixteenth time that the race had been run as a World Championship event since the inaugural season in 1950.

Defending race winner Nico Rosberg entered the round with a twenty-six-point lead over teammate Lewis Hamilton in the World Drivers' Championship; they were the only two drivers who could win the title at the start of the race, and both remained in contention after it. Their team, Mercedes, held a lead of two hundred and thirty-six points over Red Bull Racing in the World Constructors' Championship before the race; Red Bull were fifty-three points ahead of Scuderia Ferrari.

== Report ==
Lewis Hamilton won the race to narrow the Championship gap between him and teammate Nico Rosberg surviving a scare at the start when he ran wide at the first corner, before there was a brief Safety Car period after Pascal Wehrlein was punted off at the same corner. Both Max Verstappen and Sebastian Vettel were stripped of third place podium finishes when penalised post-race. Verstappen crossed the finish line in third, followed 0.99 seconds later by Vettel, himself followed 3.55 seconds later by Verstappen's teammate Daniel Ricciardo. Before the trophy presentation, Verstappen was penalised five seconds for cutting a race corner and unfairly maintaining his narrow lead over Vettel on lap 68. While Vettel attended the podium ceremony as the revised third-place finisher, he was soon given a ten-second penalty for driving dangerously on lap 69, for moving under braking to block Ricciardo as he attempted a pass, under new rules introduced at the United States Grand Prix the previous week. This meant that Ricciardo was promoted to third which also sealed third place in the championship for him, while Verstappen was relegated from third to fourth and Vettel was moved from fourth to third to fifth once the stewards had reviewed all incidents.

== Classification ==
=== Qualifying ===
| Pos. | Car no. | Driver | Constructor | Qualifying times | | | Final grid |
| Pos. | Car no. | Driver | Constructor | Q1 | Q2 | Q3 | Final grid |
|---|---|---|---|---|---|---|---|
| 1 | 44 | (United Kingdom) Lewis Hamilton | Mercedes | 1:19.447 | 1:19.137 | 1:18.704 | 1 |
| 2 | 6 | (Germany) Nico Rosberg | Mercedes | 1:19.996 | 1:19.761 | 1:18.958 | 2 |
| 3 | 33 | (Netherlands) Max Verstappen | Red Bull Racing-TAG Heuer | 1:19.874 | 1:18.972 | 1:19.054 | 3 |
| 4 | 3 | (Australia) Daniel Ricciardo | Red Bull Racing-TAG Heuer | 1:19.713 | 1:19.553 | 1:19.133 | 4 |
| 5 | 27 | (Germany) Nico Hülkenberg | Force India-Mercedes | 1:20.599 | 1:19.769 | 1:19.330 | 5 |
| 6 | 7 | (Finland) Kimi Räikkönen | Ferrari | 1:19.554 | 1:19.936 | 1:19.376 | 6 |
| 7 | 5 | (Germany) Sebastian Vettel | Ferrari | 1:19.865 | 1:19.385 | 1:19.381 | 7 |
| 8 | 77 | (Finland) Valtteri Bottas | Williams-Mercedes | 1:20.338 | 1:19.958 | 1:19.551 | 8 |
| 9 | 19 | (Brazil) Felipe Massa | Williams-Mercedes | 1:20.423 | 1:20.151 | 1:20.032 | 9 |
| 10 | 55 | (Spain) Carlos Sainz Jr. | Toro Rosso-Ferrari | 1:20.457 | 1:20.169 | 1:20.378 | 10 |
| 11 | 14 | (Spain) Fernando Alonso | McLaren-Honda | 1:20.552 | 1:20.282 | | 11 |
| 12 | 11 | (Mexico) Sergio Pérez | Force India-Mercedes | 1:20.308 | 1:20.287 | | 12 |
| 13 | 22 | (United Kingdom) Jenson Button | McLaren-Honda | 1:21.333 | 1:20.673 | | 13 |
| 14 | 20 | (Denmark) Kevin Magnussen | Renault | 1:21.254 | 1:21.131 | | 14 |
| 15 | 9 | (Sweden) Marcus Ericsson | Sauber-Ferrari | 1:21.062 | 1:21.536 | | 15 |
| 16 | 94 | (Germany) Pascal Wehrlein | MRT-Mercedes | 1:21.363 | 1:21.785 | | 16 |
| 17 | 21 | (Mexico) Esteban Gutiérrez | Haas-Ferrari | 1:21.401 | | | 17 |
| 18 | 26 | (Russia) Daniil Kvyat | Toro Rosso-Ferrari | 1:21.454 | | | 18 |
| 19 | 12 | (Brazil) Felipe Nasr | Sauber-Ferrari | 1:21.692 | | | 19 |
| 20 | 31 | (France) Esteban Ocon | MRT-Mercedes | 1:21.881 | | | 20 |
| 21 | 8 | (France) Romain Grosjean | Haas-Ferrari | 1:21.916 | | | 21 |
107% time: 1:25.008
| — | 30 | (United Kingdom) Jolyon Palmer | Renault | No time | | | 22^{1} |

Notes

- ^1 – Jolyon Palmer did not set a lap time in qualifying. His participation in the race was permitted at the discretion of the stewards.

=== Race ===
| Pos. | No. | Driver | Constructor | Laps | Time/Retired | Grid | Points |
|---|---|---|---|---|---|---|---|
| 1 | 44 | (United Kingdom) Lewis Hamilton | Mercedes | 71 | 1:40:31.402 | 1 | 25 |
| 2 | 6 | (Germany) Nico Rosberg | Mercedes | 71 | +8.354 | 2 | 18 |
| 3 | 3 | (Australia) Daniel Ricciardo | Red Bull Racing-TAG Heuer | 71 | +20.858 | 4 | 15 |
| 4 | 33 | (Netherlands) Max Verstappen | Red Bull Racing-TAG Heuer | 71 | +21.323^{1} | 3 | 12 |
| 5 | 5 | (Germany) Sebastian Vettel | Ferrari | 71 | +27.313^{2} | 7 | 10 |
| 6 | 7 | (Finland) Kimi Räikkönen | Ferrari | 71 | +49.376 | 6 | 8 |
| 7 | 27 | (Germany) Nico Hülkenberg | Force India-Mercedes | 71 | +58.891 | 5 | 6 |
| 8 | 77 | (Finland) Valtteri Bottas | Williams-Mercedes | 71 | +1:05.612 | 8 | 4 |
| 9 | 19 | (Brazil) Felipe Massa | Williams-Mercedes | 71 | +1:16.206 | 9 | 2 |
| 10 | 11 | (Mexico) Sergio Pérez | Force India-Mercedes | 71 | +1:16.798 | 12 | 1 |
| 11 | 9 | (Sweden) Marcus Ericsson | Sauber-Ferrari | 70 | +1 Lap | 15 | |
| 12 | 22 | (United Kingdom) Jenson Button | McLaren-Honda | 70 | +1 Lap | 13 | |
| 13 | 14 | (Spain) Fernando Alonso | McLaren-Honda | 70 | +1 Lap | 11 | |
| 14 | 30 | (United Kingdom) Jolyon Palmer | Renault | 70 | +1 Lap | 21 | |
| 15 | 12 | (Brazil) Felipe Nasr | Sauber-Ferrari | 70 | +1 Lap | 19 | |
| 16 | 55 | (Spain) Carlos Sainz Jr. | Toro Rosso-Ferrari | 70 | +1 Lap^{3} | 10 | |
| 17 | 20 | (Denmark) Kevin Magnussen | Renault | 70 | +1 Lap | 14 | |
| 18 | 26 | (Russia) Daniil Kvyat | Toro Rosso-Ferrari | 70 | +1 Lap^{4} | 18 | |
| 19 | 21 | (Mexico) Esteban Gutiérrez | Haas-Ferrari | 70 | +1 Lap | 17 | |
| 20 | 8 | (France) Romain Grosjean | Haas-Ferrari | 70 | +1 Lap | PL^{5} | |
| 21 | 31 | (France) Esteban Ocon | MRT-Mercedes | 69 | +2 Laps | 20 | |
| Ret | 94 | (Germany) Pascal Wehrlein | MRT-Mercedes | 0 | Collision | 16 | |

Notes

- ^1 – Max Verstappen was handed a five-second time penalty for gaining an advantage while attempting to overtake Sebastian Vettel.
- ^2 – Sebastian Vettel received a ten-second penalty for moving under braking while defending against Daniel Ricciardo and two licence points penalty after the race.
- ^3 – Carlos Sainz Jr. was penalty five-second for pushing Fernando Alonso at the start, dropping him from 15th to 16th place.
- ^4 – Daniil Kvyat was handed a five-second penalty for exceeding track limits, dropping from 17th to 18th place.
- ^5 – Romain Grosjean required to start from the pit lane due to car being modified whilst under Parc Ferme conditions.

== Championship standings after the race ==
Drivers' Championship standings

| Pos. | Driver | Points |
|---|---|---|
| 1 | (Germany) **Nico Rosberg*** | 349 |
| 2 | (United Kingdom) **Lewis Hamilton*** | 330 |
| 3 | (Australia) Daniel Ricciardo | 242 |
| 4 | (Germany) Sebastian Vettel | 187 |
| 5 | (Finland) Kimi Räikkönen | 178 |

Constructors' Championship standings

| Pos. | Constructor | Points |
|---|---|---|
| 1 | (Germany) **Mercedes** | 679 |
| 2 | (Austria) Red Bull Racing-TAG Heuer | 427 |
| 3 | (Italy) Ferrari | 365 |
| 4 | Force India-Mercedes | 145 |
| 5 | (United Kingdom) Williams-Mercedes | 136 |

- Note: Only the top five positions are included for the sets of standings.
- **Bold text** indicates the 2016 World Constructors' Champions.
- **Bold text** and an asterisk indicates competitors with a theoritical chance of being World Champion.

| Previous race: 2016 United States Grand Prix | FIA Formula One World Championship; 2016 season | Next race: 2016 Brazilian Grand Prix |
| Previous race: 2015 Mexican Grand Prix | Mexican Grand Prix | Next race: 2017 Mexican Grand Prix |
Awards
| Preceded by 2015 Mexican Grand Prix | Formula One Promotional Trophy for Race Promoter; 2016 | Succeeded by 2017 Mexican Grand Prix |
