= Mexican Grand Prix =

Formula One Grand Prix

Mexican Grand Prix Mexico City Grand Prix
- Autódromo Hermanos Rodríguez

Race information
- Number of times held: 26
- First held: 1962
- Most wins (drivers): (Netherlands) Max Verstappen (6)
- Most wins (constructors): (Austria) Red Bull Racing (6)
- Circuit length: 4.304 km (2.674 miles)
- Race length: 305.354 km (189.738 miles)
- Laps: 71

Last race (2026)

Pole position
- (United Kingdom) Lewis Hamilton; Ferrari; 1:16.514

Podium
- 1. (Netherlands) M. Verstappen; Red Bull Racing-Red Bull Ford; 2:20:28.772; 2. (United Kingdom) L. Hamilton; Ferrari; +0.799; 3. (Italy) K. Antonelli; Mercedes; +4.006

Fastest lap
- (United Kingdom) Lewis Hamilton; Ferrari; 1:19.268

The Mexican Grand Prix (Spanish: Gran Premio de México), currently held under the name Mexico City Grand Prix (Spanish: Gran Premio de la Ciudad de México), is a motor racing event held at the Autódromo Hermanos Rodríguez in Mexico City. It first appeared as a non-championship event in 1962 before being held as a championship event in 1963–1970 and 1986–1992. The Grand Prix returned in 2015 at the Mexico City circuit, and held the event from 2015 to 2019, and since 2021; it was due to host the Grand Prix in 2020, but this was cancelled in response to the COVID-19 pandemic. The venue is contracted to host the event until 2028.

== History ==
=== Magdalena Mixhuca (1962–1970) ===
The Mexican Grand Prix was first held on 4 November 1962 at the Magdalena Mixhuca circuit. The circuit was the first international racetrack in Mexico, and like Monza in Milan, Italy, it was built within a park in the center part of a major city, in this case the Mexican capital of Mexico City. The race provided unique challenges for racing, standing at 2,240m (7,340 ft) above sea level, as well as the long, 180-degree, lightly banked and fast Peraltada corner that finishes the lap, in addition to being a bumpy racetrack from actively shifting soils beneath the circuit. The Mexican Grand Prix of this period was always the season finale Grand Prix, held in late October.

The first race, a non-championship affair which attracted a strong international entry, was won by Team Lotus with Jim Clark taking over the car of teammate Trevor Taylor to claim the win; Clark was black-flagged after receiving a push-start at a confused race start. The meeting was marred by the death of young Mexican star Ricardo Rodríguez, killed in practice in a Rob Walker run Lotus 24 on the Peraltada.

The Formula One World Championship arrived the following year with Clark winning again, equalling Juan Manuel Fangio's record of most victories in a single season. 1964 saw the battle for both the Drivers' and Constructors' championships. British drivers Clark, John Surtees and Graham Hill all arrived with a chance, with Hill leading the table, and Ferrari, BRM and Lotus were in contention for the Constructors' Championship. Ferrari signalled Lorenzo Bandini to let teammate Surtees through, which he did, and Surtees finished second behind Gurney to win the championship by one point; Ferrari won the Constructors' Championship.

American Richie Ginther took victory for Honda in 1965, the Japanese company's first win in Formula One. Clark won his third Mexican Grand Prix in 1967, making him the most frequent winner of the race as of 2019.

In 1968, three men again came into the race with a chance of winning the Drivers' Championship: Hill, his countryman Jackie Stewart, and New Zealander and defending world champion Denny Hulme. The race was a straight fight between Hill and Stewart; the Scotsman led for several laps until Hill passed him. Hulme was running third, but he had a rear suspension failure and crashed on Lap 11. Swiss Jo Siffert decided to get in on the mix and took the lead, but he had to pit with a broken throttle cable. Stewart then fell back when his engine started to misfire, and he experienced handling and fuel-feed problems. Hill had no problems and took victory and his second driver's championship.

Crowd control in 1968 and 1970 contributed to cancellation of the event. In 1970, a record crowd of approximately 200,000 arrived to see Pedro Rodríguez, forcing officials to delay the race start by an hour as they struggled to control the crowd. At one point, a dog ran across the track and was hit by Stewart. During the race, spectators threw bottles on the track. Amid the chaos, Clay Regazzoni trailed Jacky Ickx for a 1-2 Ferrari finish.

The 1971 event was scheduled, with a large fund deposited in a Swiss bank to help guarantee better crowd control, but after the death of Pedro Rodriguez, the plan was abandoned.

=== Autódromo Hermanos Rodríguez (1986–1992) ===
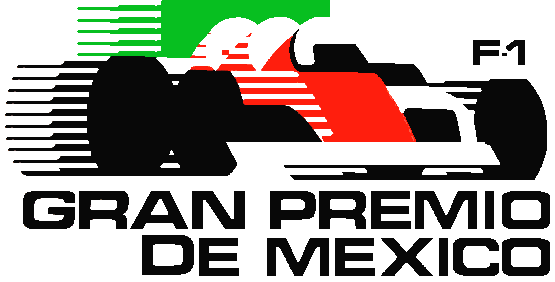
Classic Mexican GP event logo.

There had been a number of attempts to bring the Mexican Grand Prix back on the F1 calendar, one attempt being when it was originally scheduled in April 1980, two weeks after the US Grand Prix West, but was cancelled. American IndyCars arrived for a brief two-year visit in 1980 and 1981, racing as the Gran Premio Tecate on the Magdalena Mixhuca track now named after Mexico's two lost racing heroes, Autódromo Hermanos Rodríguez. The event was dominated by Rick Mears. A number of years later, work began on rebuilding the Hermanos Rodríguez circuit with much improved organisation. The circuit's layout was slightly shorter, the Peraltada's banking had been eased and the circuit was generally much safer than it had been. The Grand Prix returned in 1986, where the race played host to Austrian Gerhard Berger's first win in his Benetton B186, in a race where an ill Berger outlasted his opposition, as tyre problems struck most of the field. The circuit was still very rough and bumpy. 1987 saw the race being run in two parts. It was stopped around mid-distance when Briton Derek Warwick crashed heavily coming out of the Peraltada. Brazilian driver Nelson Piquet finished first on the road, but because his Williams teammate Nigel Mansell was 30 seconds ahead when the first race ended, Mansell kept Piquet in sight and won the race on cumulative time.

The 1988 race was moved from mid-October to a warmer and more rain-prone late May season slot, so that it could be paired with the other North American Grands Prix in Montreal and Detroit. This race saw Frenchman Alain Prost dominate in his McLaren, and Prost's Brazilian teammate Ayrton Senna won the next year; this was at a time when the two men's relationship was at a low point. 1990 saw the race moved to late June. Prost, now at Ferrari, qualified 13th on the grid but drove through the field and took second from his teammate Mansell late in the race. Senna, who was leading, had a slow puncture that turned into shredded rubber, and he went into the pits to have it changed, but the suspension was too badly damaged for the Brazilian to continue. This put Prost and Mansell 1–2, but Senna's teammate Gerhard Berger was challenging Mansell for second; Berger passed the Englishman going into the Moises Solana esses, but Mansell repassed him around the outside of the Peraltada on the same lap. Prost won the race; Mansell and Berger finished second and third. 1991 saw Senna crash heavily at the Peraltada during practice; he was declared fit to race by FIA doctor Sid Watkins; he finished third behind Williams drivers Riccardo Patrese and Mansell; but Senna had been critical of the severely bumpy circuit all of that weekend. On 9 October 1991, European media sources reported that promoters barely made enough funds to pay off F1 for the 1991 race. FISA demanded improvements to the track for the 1992 event, which were made.

For the 1992 season, the race had been moved further forward to March, and on 20 February of that year, Mexico City's air pollution had reached a record level. City officials had imposed emergency measures banning half of government cars and equipment from the streets; this was not helped by the fact that Mexico City is situated in a valley surrounded by mountains, which restricts polluted air to travel elsewhere to dissipate. This put extra stress on the Mexican Grand Prix committee to ensure the track was ready for 1992. Some safety measures had been implemented to the track, including further easing of the banking at Peraltada, making the corner a little slower; this was done to avoid bypassing the entry to this corner via making an alternate route to the middle of the Peraltada through the park's baseball stadium. Although the circuit was popular with drivers, they complained during interviews with the press about the ubiquitous and severe bumps on the circuit, which had decayed even further and were worse than before - even the Peraltada was very bumpy and Mansell nearly crashed there during practice. Despite these concerns, the race that year went ahead and saw Williams teammates Mansell and Patrese dominate the race. Senna had another bad accident during practice, this time at the fast Esses - Senna went over a nasty series of bumps that unsettled the car to the point where Senna lost control, went off the track and hit a concrete wall; he had minor injuries but qualified sixth and took part in the race. But the state of the track, the decline of Mexico City itself, not only with air pollution problems but also a rapid and unstable city population increase, saw Formula One leave again.

=== Absence (1993–2014) ===
2002 saw the revival of the Grand Prix of Mexico for Champ Cars on a much modified version of the Autódromo Hermanos Rodríguez circuit, which included cutting the Peraltada in half. This was a six-year stay, which saw Sébastien Bourdais win half of the six races that followed.

Rumors first surfaced in 2003 that the Mexican Grand Prix might return to the Formula One calendar at a new $70 million circuit, dubbed "Mantarraya", to be built near Cancún. In 2005, the governor of Quintana Roo state said that Mexico would have a Grand Prix on the calendar for 2006. The plan was halted later that year as a debate arose about whether the land the circuit was to be built on was properly owned by the right people to do so.

After the 2006 United States Grand Prix, Bernie Ecclestone announced that the Grand Prix of Mexico would return for the 2009 season, but nothing further came from the announcement.

=== Return to the Autódromo Hermanos Rodríguez (2015–2019, 2021–present) ===
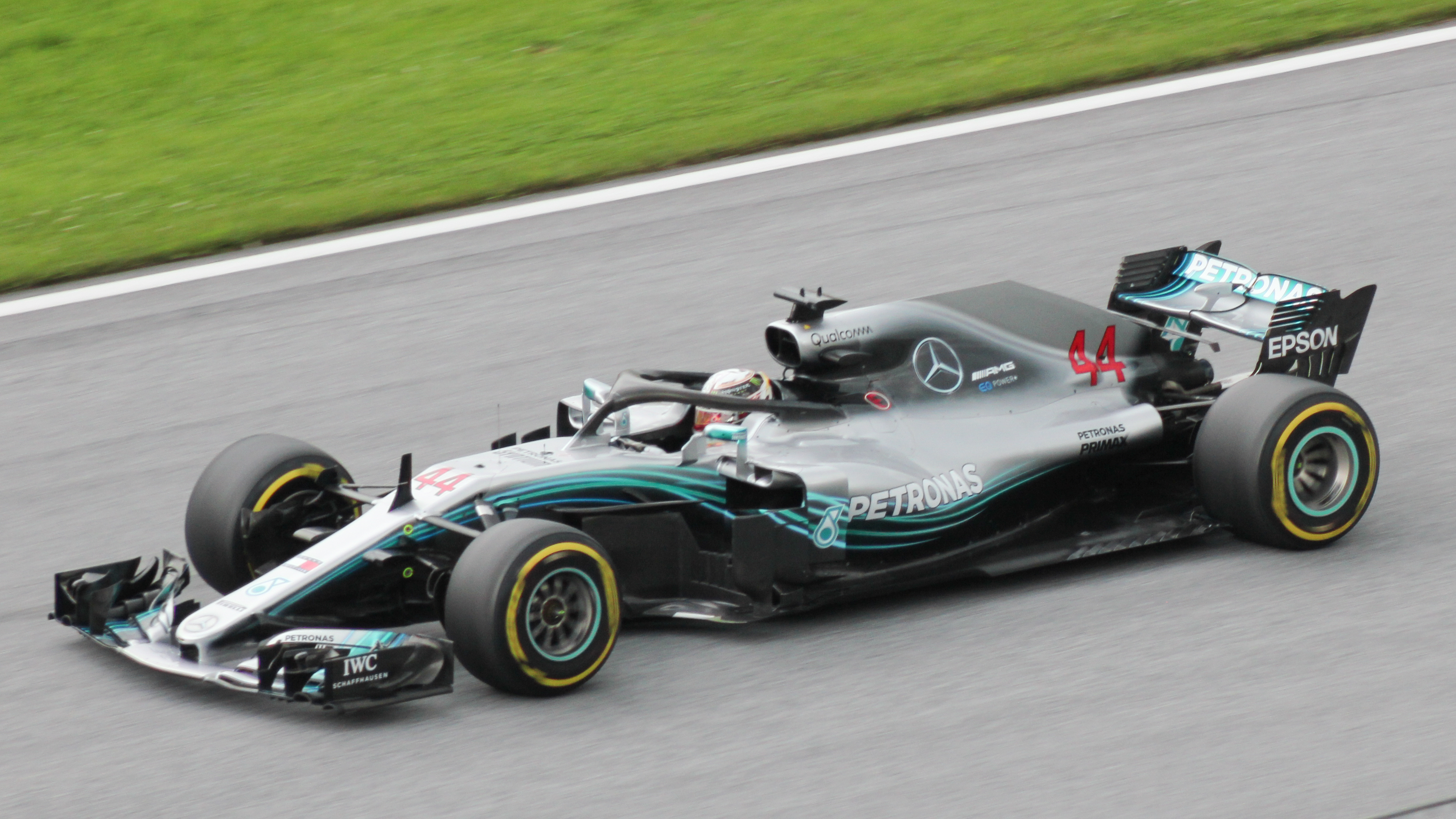
Seven-time World Champion Lewis Hamilton clinched his fourth and fifth titles in 2017 and 2018 respectively at the Mexican Grand Prix.

In August 2011, Carlos Slim Domit revealed plans for a revived race. In August 2013, it was suggested by "high level sources" that the Mexican Grand Prix could be on the provisional 2014 World Championship calendar. A preliminary draft calendar for the 2014 season, circulated in early September 2013, assigned 9 November 2014 for the Mexican Grand Prix, but did not specify a circuit and noted that the event was "subject to confirmation". On 5 December 2013, the FIA released the official 2014 Formula One season calendar, and the Mexican Grand Prix was not on the calendar; then the FIA announced that the Mexican Grand Prix was postponed to 2015 due to lack of sufficient preparation time to upgrade the somewhat run-down Hermanos Rodríguez circuit to Formula 1 working standards. In July 2014, Ecclestone confirmed that he had signed a 5-year deal for the Hermanos Rodríguez track to host the Mexican Grand Prix, starting in 2015. On 3 December 2014, the FIA published a confirmed calendar for 2015 showing the 2015 Grand Prix of Mexico on 1 November 2015. German Nico Rosberg won the 2015 event in his Mercedes.

On 14 May 2019, Mexico City mayor Claudia Sheinbaum announced that 2019 would be the last year for the Grand Prix of Mexico because the MXN $400 million (US$20.865 million) fee was to be invested in the Tren Maya. It is estimated that the race generates MXN $8,400 million to the local economy. However, on 8 August it was announced that the Mexican Grand Prix would remain on the calendar until 2022, though it would be renamed to "Mexico City Grand Prix", in order to emphasize the support from the government of Mexico City.

The 2020 edition was scheduled on 1 November under the name of "Mexico City Grand Prix", but cancelled on 24 July because of travel restrictions in the Americas (along with the other races in North and South America). The 2021 event therefore became the first event to take place under the Mexico City Grand Prix moniker.

The Mexico City Grand Prix signed an extension to stay on the calendar until 2025. A further extension was signed in 2025 that would see the Grand Prix be on the calendar until 2028.

== Winners ==
=== By year ===
The Hermann Tilke renovated Autódromo Hermanos Rodríguez circuit (2015–2019, 2021–present)

The Autódromo Hermanos Rodríguez circuit used in 1986–1992

The original Magdalena Mixhuca circuit used in 1962–1970

- A pink background indicates an event which was not part of the Formula One World Championship.
- Since 2021 the event has been held under the name "Mexico City Grand Prix".

Year	Driver	Constructor	Location	Report
1962	(United Kingdom) Trevor Taylor (United Kingdom) Jim Clark	Lotus-Climax	Magdalena Mixhuca	Report
1963	(United Kingdom) Jim Clark	Lotus-Climax	Magdalena Mixhuca	Report
1964	(United States) Dan Gurney	Brabham-Climax	Magdalena Mixhuca	Report
1965	(United States) Richie Ginther	Honda	Magdalena Mixhuca	Report
1966	(United Kingdom) John Surtees	Cooper-Maserati	Magdalena Mixhuca	Report
1967	(United Kingdom) Jim Clark	Lotus-Ford	Magdalena Mixhuca	Report
1968	(United Kingdom) Graham Hill	Lotus-Ford	Magdalena Mixhuca	Report
1969	(New Zealand) Denny Hulme	McLaren-Ford	Magdalena Mixhuca	Report
1970	(Belgium) Jacky Ickx	Ferrari	Magdalena Mixhuca	Report
1971 – 1985	Not held			
1986	(Austria) Gerhard Berger	Benetton-BMW	Hermanos Rodríguez	Report
1987	(United Kingdom) Nigel Mansell	Williams-Honda	Hermanos Rodríguez	Report
1988	**(France)** Alain Prost	McLaren-Honda	Hermanos Rodríguez	Report
1989	(Brazil) Ayrton Senna	McLaren-Honda	Hermanos Rodríguez	Report
1990	**(France)** Alain Prost	Ferrari	Hermanos Rodríguez	Report
1991	(Italy) Riccardo Patrese	Williams-Renault	Hermanos Rodríguez	Report
1992	(United Kingdom) Nigel Mansell	Williams-Renault	Hermanos Rodríguez	Report
1993 – 2014	Not held			
2015	(Germany) Nico Rosberg	Mercedes	Hermanos Rodríguez	Report
2016	(United Kingdom) Lewis Hamilton	Mercedes	Hermanos Rodríguez	Report
2017	(Netherlands) Max Verstappen	Red Bull Racing-TAG Heuer	Hermanos Rodríguez	Report
2018	(Netherlands) Max Verstappen	Red Bull Racing-TAG Heuer	Hermanos Rodríguez	Report
2019	(United Kingdom) Lewis Hamilton	Mercedes	Hermanos Rodríguez	Report
2020	Cancelled due to the COVID-19 pandemic			
2021	(Netherlands) Max Verstappen	Red Bull Racing-Honda	Hermanos Rodríguez	Report
2022	(Netherlands) Max Verstappen	Red Bull Racing-RBPT	Hermanos Rodríguez	Report
2023	(Netherlands) Max Verstappen	Red Bull Racing-Honda RBPT	Hermanos Rodríguez	Report
2024	(Spain) Carlos Sainz Jr.	Ferrari	Hermanos Rodríguez	Report
2025	(United Kingdom) Lando Norris	McLaren-Mercedes	Hermanos Rodríguez	Report
2026	(Netherlands) Max Verstappen	Red Bull Racing-Red Bull Ford	Hermanos Rodríguez	Report

=== Repeat winners (drivers) ===
Drivers in bold are competing in the Formula One championship in 2026.
A pink background indicates an event which was not part of the Formula One World Championship.

Wins	Driver	Years won
6	**(Netherlands) Max Verstappen**	2017, 2018, 2021, 2022, 2023, 2026
3	(United Kingdom) Jim Clark	1962*, 1963, 1967
2	**(France)** Alain Prost	1988, 1990
2	(United Kingdom) Nigel Mansell	1987, 1992
2	**(United Kingdom) Lewis Hamilton**	2016, 2019

* Shared win with Trevor Taylor

=== Repeat winners (constructors) ===
Teams in bold are competing in the Formula One championship in 2026.
A pink background indicates an event which was not part of the Formula One World Championship.

Wins	Constructor	Years won
6	(Austria) **Red Bull**	2017, 2018, 2021, 2022, 2023, 2026
4	(United Kingdom) Lotus	1962, 1963, 1967, 1968
4	(United Kingdom) **McLaren**	1969, 1988, 1989, 2025
3	(Italy) **Ferrari**	1970, 1990, 2024
3	(United Kingdom) **Williams**	1987, 1991, 1992
3	(Germany) **Mercedes**	2015, 2016, 2019

=== Repeat winners (engine manufacturers) ===
Manufacturers in bold are competing in the Formula One championship in 2026.
A pink background indicates an event which was not part of the Formula One World Championship.

Wins	Manufacturer	Years won
5	**(Japan) Honda**	1965, 1987, 1988, 1989, 2021
4	(Germany) **Mercedes**	2015, 2016, 2019, 2025
3	(United Kingdom) Climax	1962, 1963, 1964
3	(United States) Ford *	1967, 1968, 1969
3	(Italy) **Ferrari**	1970, 1990, 2024
2	(France) Renault	1991, 1992
2	(Switzerland) TAG Heuer **	2017, 2018

* Built by Cosworth, funded by Ford

** Built by Renault
