= 2019 Brazilian Grand Prix =

20th round of the 2019 Formula One season

Race 20 of 21 in the 2019 Formula One World Championship
← Previous race	Next race →
- Layout of the Autódromo José Carlos Pace

Race details
- Date: 17 November 2019
- Official name: Formula 1 Heineken Grande Prêmio do Brasil 2019
- Location: Autódromo José Carlos Pace, São Paulo, Brazil
- Course: Permanent racing facility
- Course length: 4.309 km (2.677 miles)
- Distance: 71 laps, 305.879 km (190.064 miles)
- Weather: Sunny

Pole position
Driver	(Netherlands) Max Verstappen	Red Bull Racing-Honda
- Time: 1:07.508

Fastest lap
Driver	(Finland) Valtteri Bottas	Mercedes
- Time: 1:10.698 on lap 43

Podium
First	(Netherlands) Max Verstappen	Red Bull Racing-Honda
Second	(France) Pierre Gasly	Scuderia Toro Rosso-Honda
Third	(Spain) Carlos Sainz Jr.	McLaren-Renault

The 2019 Brazilian Grand Prix (formally known as the Formula 1 Heineken Grande Prêmio do Brasil 2019) was a Formula One motor race that was held on 17 November 2019 at the Autódromo José Carlos Pace in São Paulo, Brazil. The race was the twentieth and penultimate round of the 2019 FIA Formula One World Championship. The race marked the 47th time the race had been run as a World Championship event since the first championship event in 1973, and the 48th time the race had been run overall.

The race was won by Max Verstappen with Pierre Gasly and Carlos Sainz Jr. taking their first podiums in second and third respectively. Sainz also scored McLaren's first podium since 2014, while Gasly's podium turned out to be the last for Toro Rosso in Formula One.

== Background ==
=== Entrants ===
The drivers and teams were the same as the season entry list with no additional stand-in drivers for the race. However, Nicholas Latifi drove in the first practice session for Williams, replacing Robert Kubica.

== Qualifying ==
=== Qualifying classification ===
Pos.	No.	Driver	Constructor	Qualifying times			Final grid
Pos.	No.	Driver	Constructor	Q1	Q2	Q3	Final grid
1	33	(Netherlands) Max Verstappen	Red Bull Racing-Honda	1:08.242	1:07.503	1:07.508	1
2	5	(Germany) Sebastian Vettel	Ferrari	1:08.556	1:08.050	1:07.631	2
3	44	(United Kingdom) Lewis Hamilton	Mercedes	1:08.614	1:08.088	1:07.699	3
4	16	(Monaco) Charles Leclerc	Ferrari	1:08.496	1:07.888	1:07.728	14^{a}
5	77	(Finland) Valtteri Bottas	Mercedes	1:08.545	1:08.232	1:07.874	4
6	23	(Thailand) Alexander Albon	Red Bull Racing-Honda	1:08.503	1:08.117	1:07.935	5
7	10	(France) Pierre Gasly	Scuderia Toro Rosso-Honda	1:08.909	1:08.770	1:08.837	6
8	8	(France) Romain Grosjean	Haas-Ferrari	1:09.197	1:08.705	1:08.854	7
9	7	(Finland) Kimi Räikkönen	Alfa Romeo Racing-Ferrari	1:09.276	1:08.858	1:08.984	8
10	20	(Denmark) Kevin Magnussen	Haas-Ferrari	1:08.875	1:08.803	1:09.037	9
11	4	(United Kingdom) Lando Norris	McLaren-Renault	1:08.891	1:08.868	N/A	10
12	3	(Australia) Daniel Ricciardo	Renault	1:09.086	1:08.903	N/A	11
13	99	(Italy) Antonio Giovinazzi	Alfa Romeo Racing-Ferrari	1:09.175	1:08.919	N/A	12
14	27	(Germany) Nico Hülkenberg	Renault	1:09.050	1:08.921	N/A	13
15	11	(Mexico) Sergio Pérez	Racing Point-BWT Mercedes	1:09.288	1:09.035	N/A	15
16	26	(Russia) Daniil Kvyat	Scuderia Toro Rosso-Honda	1:09.320	N/A	N/A	16
17	18	(Canada) Lance Stroll	Racing Point-BWT Mercedes	1:09.536	N/A	N/A	17
18	63	(United Kingdom) George Russell	Williams-Mercedes	1:10.126	N/A	N/A	18
19	88	(Poland) Robert Kubica	Williams-Mercedes	1:10.614	N/A	N/A	19
107% time: 1:13.018
—	55	(Spain) Carlos Sainz Jr.	McLaren-Renault	No time	N/A	N/A	20^{b}

Notes

- ^a – Charles Leclerc received a 10-place grid penalty for exceeding his quota for power unit components.
- ^b – Carlos Sainz Jr. failed to set a Q1 time. He was allowed to race at the stewards discretion.

== Race ==
Max Verstappen maintained his lead down into the first corner, while just behind, Lewis Hamilton overtook Sebastian Vettel for second. Apart from a few minor changes in the midfield, and Charles Leclerc steadily making upwards progress from fourteenth on the grid, the order remained generally stable for the first few laps. On lap 9 Daniel Ricciardo attempted an overtake on Kevin Magnussen, but Ricciardo locked his tyres, causing a collision which resulted in Magnussen going into a spin and Ricciardo suffering damage to his front wing. Ricciardo was later given a five-second time penalty for the incident. By lap 11 Leclerc had made his way up to sixth place.

By lap 18 the soft tyres were generally running out of life with Sergio Pérez the first to stop the following lap. On lap 20 Mercedes pitted Hamilton, hoping to undercut Verstappen. The next lap, Red Bull pitted Verstappen to try to cover off Hamilton. The pit stop broke the record for fastest pit stop with a time of 1.82 seconds, beating the previous time of 1.88 seconds which was made during the 2019 German Grand Prix. This was beaten by Norris and his crew at McLaren during the 2023 Qatar Grand Prix. As Verstappen exited the pits the Williams of Robert Kubica pulled out in front of him, forcing the Red Bull to take evasive action; this resulted in Verstappen losing time and falling behind Hamilton. Verstappen and Hamilton quickly passed Leclerc, before Verstappen overtook Hamilton into turn 1. The two then passed Alexander Albon, Valtteri Bottas, and Vettel, who all pitted. At this point in the race, the cars outside the top six ran: Pierre Gasly, Kimi Räikkönen, Antonio Giovinazzi, and Sergio Pérez rounding out the top ten.

Over the next dozen of laps the wind started to pick up in speed. On lap 42 Bottas pitted for hard tyres, with his teammate, Hamilton, pitting two laps later to go onto the mediums. On lap 45 Verstappen pitted to prevent the undercut attempt from Hamilton. Further back, Bottas was unable to find a way past the Ferrari of Leclerc. Bottas retired on lap 52 with a hydraulics problem. His stopped car was adjudged to need a safety car to retrieve, initiating a round of pit stops. Hamilton was told to do the opposite of Verstappen, and so Hamilton stayed out whereas Verstappen pitted.

Further back, Leclerc and George Russell also pitted and any lapped cars were allowed to unlap themselves forcing the safety car to stay out for another couple of laps. At the restart, the order of the top ten was as follows: Hamilton, Verstappen, Vettel, Albon, Leclerc, Gasly, Romain Grosjean, Carlos Sainz, Räikkönen and Giovinazzi. Verstappen managed to overtake Hamilton into turn 1. Further back, the other Red Bull of Albon overtook Vettel for third, while Grosjean in the Haas started to have problems with his car, causing him to drop back. On lap 66 Leclerc overtook Vettel in turn 1, but Vettel, on the back straight, tried to take the position back. The two collided, with Leclerc suffering a broken suspension and Vettel getting a puncture. Both Ferraris retired from the race with terminal damage, and the safety car was called out again.

Mercedes then pitted Hamilton, still on lap 66, onto fresh soft tyres. This put him in line behind the safety car in fourth position, ahead of the McLaren of Sainz, but behind the Red Bulls of Verstappen and Albon, and the Toro Rosso of Gasly. During the safety car, Lance Stroll retired with front suspension damage. At the race restart, on lap 70, Hamilton passed Gasly, but later made contact with Albon while trying to pass him at turn 10. Albon was sent into a spin and was forced to rejoin the field in fifteenth position. Hamilton, too, was slowed by the contact, allowing Gasly to pass into second place. Verstappen came home to win his third race of the season. Six seconds behind him, Gasly beat Hamilton for second place by 0.062 seconds, meaning that this was the first time since 1991 that drivers using Honda-powered cars finished 1–2. Sainz, two seconds behind them both, finished fourth.

=== After the race ===
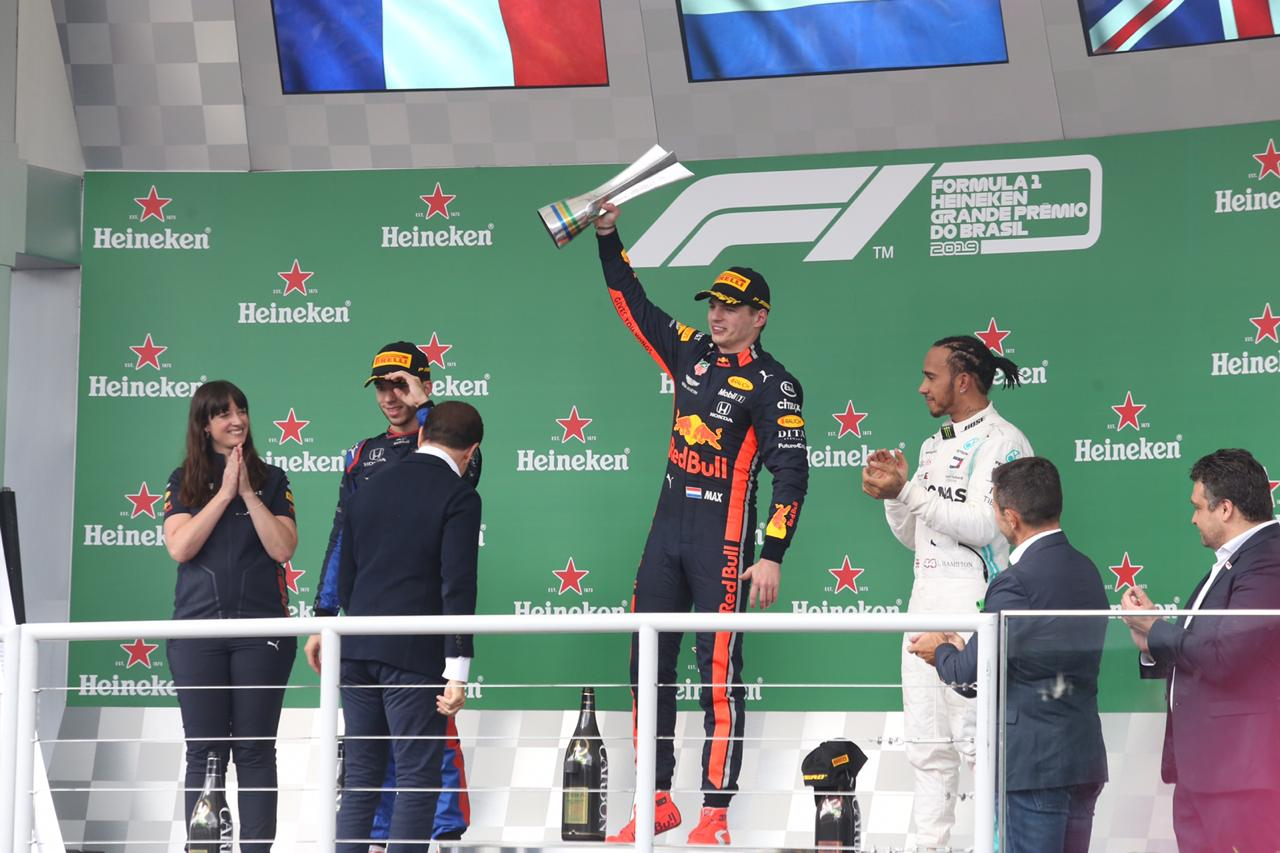
Max Verstappen, Pierre Gasly and Lewis Hamilton (subsequently penalised) on the podium.

As the final lap of the race was being run, a stewards investigation was announced concerning the Hamilton–Albon incident on lap 70. The podium ceremony was run with Verstappen, Gasly, and Hamilton, but with the investigation ongoing for Hamilton. The stewards summoned Hamilton and Albon, and Hamilton was given a five-second time penalty which dropped him from third to seventh. His penalty promoted Sainz to third, representing Sainz's first podium finish (although Sainz was not present at the podium ceremony), McLaren's first since the 2014 Australian Grand Prix and also setting a new record for the youngest combined podium age, beating the 2008 Italian Grand Prix. The race was the first since the 1994 German Grand Prix in which two drivers scored their first podiums in Formula One. The race also marked the first time in the turbo-hybrid era, introduced in 2014, and the first time since the 2013 United States Grand Prix, that the final podium trio did not feature a Mercedes or Ferrari driver. Carlos Sainz Jr.'s podium finish meant that he was the first Spanish driver to step on the podium since Fernando Alonso finished second at the 2014 Hungarian Grand Prix. Gasly's podium turned out to be the last for Scuderia Toro Rosso in Formula One before being rebranded to Scuderia AlphaTauri for the next season.

=== Race classification ===
Pos.	No.	Driver	Constructor	Laps	Time/Retired	Grid	Points
1	33	(Netherlands) Max Verstappen	Red Bull Racing-Honda	71	1:33:14.678	1	25
2	10	(France) Pierre Gasly	Scuderia Toro Rosso-Honda	71	+6.077	6	18
3	55	(Spain) Carlos Sainz Jr.	McLaren-Renault	71	+8.896	20	15
4	7	(Finland) Kimi Räikkönen	Alfa Romeo Racing-Ferrari	71	+9.452	8	12
5	99	(Italy) Antonio Giovinazzi	Alfa Romeo Racing-Ferrari	71	+10.201	12	10
6	3	(Australia) Daniel Ricciardo	Renault	71	+10.541	11	8
7	44	(United Kingdom) Lewis Hamilton	Mercedes	71	+11.139^{1}	3	6
8	4	(United Kingdom) Lando Norris	McLaren-Renault	71	+11.204	10	4
9	11	(Mexico) Sergio Pérez	Racing Point-BWT Mercedes	71	+11.529	15	2
10	26	(Russia) Daniil Kvyat	Scuderia Toro Rosso-Honda	71	+11.931	16	1
11	20	(Denmark) Kevin Magnussen	Haas-Ferrari	71	+12.732	9	
12	63	(United Kingdom) George Russell	Williams-Mercedes	71	+13.599	18	
13	8	(France) Romain Grosjean	Haas-Ferrari	71	+14.247	7	
14	23	(Thailand) Alexander Albon	Red Bull Racing-Honda	71	+14.927	5	
15	27	(Germany) Nico Hülkenberg	Renault	71	+18.059^{2}	13	
16	88	(Poland) Robert Kubica	Williams-Mercedes	70	+1 lap	19	
17^{3}	5	(Germany) Sebastian Vettel	Ferrari	65	Collision	2	
18^{3}	16	(Monaco) Charles Leclerc	Ferrari	65	Collision	14	
19^{3}	18	(Canada) Lance Stroll	Racing Point-BWT Mercedes	65	Suspension	17	
Ret	77	(Finland) Valtteri Bottas	Mercedes	51	Oil pressure	4	
Fastest lap: (Finland) Valtteri Bottas (Mercedes) – 1:10.698 (lap 43)

Notes

- ^1 – Lewis Hamilton originally finished third, but received a 5-second time penalty for causing a collision with Alexander Albon.
- ^2 – Nico Hülkenberg originally finished 12th, but received a 5-second time penalty for overtaking under safety car conditions.
- ^3 – Sebastian Vettel, Charles Leclerc and Lance Stroll were classified as they completed more than 90% of the race distance.

== Championship standings after the race ==
Drivers' Championship standings

	Pos.	Driver	Points
	1	(United Kingdom) **Lewis Hamilton**	387
	2	(Finland) Valtteri Bottas	314
1	3	(Netherlands) Max Verstappen	260
1	4	(Monaco) Charles Leclerc	249
	5	(Germany) Sebastian Vettel	230

Constructors' Championship standings

Pos.	Constructor	Points
1	(Germany) **Mercedes**	701
2	(Italy) Ferrari	479
3	(Austria) Red Bull Racing-Honda	391
4	(United Kingdom) McLaren-Renault	140
5	(France) Renault	91

- Note: Only the top five positions are included for both sets of standings.
- **Bold text** indicates the 2019 World Champions.

Previous race: 2019 United States Grand Prix	FIA Formula One World Championship; 2019 season	Next race: 2019 Abu Dhabi Grand Prix
Previous race: 2018 Brazilian Grand Prix	Brazilian Grand Prix	Next race: 2021 São Paulo Grand Prix
