= 2023 São Paulo Grand Prix =

Twentieth round of the 2023 F1 season

Race 20 of 22 in the 2023 Formula One World Championship
← Previous race	Next race →
- Layout of the Autódromo José Carlos Pace

Race details
- Date: 5 November 2023
- Official name: Formula 1 Rolex Grande Prêmio de São Paulo 2023
- Location: Autódromo José Carlos Pace; São Paulo, Brazil
- Course: Permanent racing facility
- Course length: 4.309 km (2.677 miles)
- Distance: 71 laps, 305.879 km (190.064 miles)
- Weather: Partly cloudy
- Attendance: 267,000

Pole position
Driver	(Netherlands) Max Verstappen	Red Bull Racing-Honda RBPT
- Time: 1:10.727

Fastest lap
Driver	(United Kingdom) Lando Norris	McLaren-Mercedes
- Time: 1:12.486 on lap 61

Podium
First	(Netherlands) Max Verstappen	Red Bull Racing-Honda RBPT
Second	(United Kingdom) Lando Norris	McLaren-Mercedes
Third	(Spain) Fernando Alonso	Aston Martin-Mercedes

The 2023 São Paulo Grand Prix (officially known as the Formula 1 Rolex Grande Prêmio de São Paulo 2023) was a Formula One motor race held on 5 November 2023 at the Interlagos Circuit in São Paulo, Brazil. It was the twentieth round of the 2023 Formula One World Championship and the sixth and final Grand Prix weekend of the season to utilise the Formula One sprint format.

Max Verstappen took pole position for the main race during a weather-affected qualifying, while Lando Norris took the sprint pole position. Both the sprint and main race were won by Verstappen, setting a new Formula One record for highest percentage of wins in a single season. It was Red Bull Racing's 19th win of the season, matching Mercedes's 2016 season win record. Norris finished the race in second place, his 13th career podium, tying Nick Heidfeld for most podiums without a race win. Fernando Alonso finished third, after overtaking Sergio Pérez on the final lap and beat him by 0.053 seconds. This was his ninth podium at Interlagos without ever winning, his first since the 2013 Brazilian Grand Prix, and as of 2026, his most recent Formula One career podium.

== Background ==
The event was held across the weekend of 3–5 November and was the twentieth round of the 2023 Formula One World Championship. It was the 41st Formula One Grand Prix at this circuit, and the third held under the name of the São Paulo Grand Prix, having previously been titled the Brazilian Grand Prix. It was also the sixth and final Grand Prix weekend of the 2023 season to utilise the Formula One sprint format.

=== Championship standings before the race ===
Coming into the weekend, Max Verstappen led the Drivers' Championship with 491 points. He led his teammate Sergio Pérez by 251 points and Lewis Hamilton by a further 20 points. Hamilton was ahead of Carlos Sainz Jr. in fourth by 37 points, with Fernando Alonso in fifth, tied for points with Sainz. Red Bull Racing led the Constructors' Championship with 731 points, 360 points ahead of Mercedes and a further 22 points ahead of Ferrari. McLaren, in fourth, was behind Ferrari by 93 points and ahead of Aston Martin, in fifth, by 20 points.

=== Entrants ===
The drivers and teams were the same as the season entry list with the exception of Daniel Ricciardo, who replaced Nyck de Vries at AlphaTauri starting at the Hungarian Grand Prix.

=== Tyre choices ===
Tyre supplier Pirelli brought the C2, C3 and C4 tyre compounds (designated hard, medium, and soft, respectively) for teams to use at the event.

== Practice ==
The only free practice session was held on 3 November 2023, at 11:30 local time (UTC−3). Carlos Sainz Jr. ended the session first, while his Ferrari teammate Charles Leclerc finished second, with George Russell third.

== Qualifying ==
Qualifying was held on 3 November 2023, and was scheduled for 15:00 local time (UTC−3), but was delayed by 15 minutes due to debris on track from a Porsche Carrera Cup Brazil session which took place immediately prior to qualifying. The session determined the starting order for the main race.

=== Qualifying report ===
Max Verstappen took pole position after intense rain and thunderstorms caused Q3 to be red-flagged and called off with four minutes remaining. After numerous tribulations throughout the past few races, Lance Stroll found himself in third ahead of his teammate Fernando Alonso, who also improved after numerous struggles in the latter half of the season. This is Stroll's highest starting position since the 2020 Turkish Grand Prix where he took pole position. Oscar Piastri was unable to set a time, as his car slipped off into the grass as the weather began to deteriorate. This caused a yellow flag which forced Sergio Pérez to slow, resulting in them starting tenth and ninth respectively.

Penalties were given to George Russell, Esteban Ocon and Pierre Gasly for blocking the pit exit in Q1, each driver dropping two places. The intense rain caused a grandstand to collapse. No major injuries were reported.

=== Qualifying classification ===
Pos.	No.	Driver	Constructor	Qualifying times			Final grid
Pos.	No.	Driver	Constructor	Q1	Q2	Q3	Final grid
1	1	(Netherlands) Max Verstappen	Red Bull Racing-Honda RBPT	1:10.436	1:10.162	1:10.727	1
2	16	(Monaco) Charles Leclerc	Ferrari	1:10.472	1:10.303	1:11.021	2
3	18	(Canada) Lance Stroll	Aston Martin Aramco-Mercedes	1:10.551	1:10.375	1:11.344	3
4	14	(Spain) Fernando Alonso	Aston Martin Aramco-Mercedes	1:10.557	1:10.237	1:11.387	4
5	44	(United Kingdom) Lewis Hamilton	Mercedes	1:10.604	1:10.266	1:11.469	5
6	63	(United Kingdom) George Russell	Mercedes	1:10.340	1:10.316	1:11.590	8^{a}
7	4	(United Kingdom) Lando Norris	McLaren-Mercedes	1:10.623	1:10.021	1:11.987	6
8	55	(Spain) Carlos Sainz Jr.	Ferrari	1:10.624	1:10.254	1:11.989	7
9	11	(Mexico) Sergio Pérez	Red Bull Racing-Honda RBPT	1:10.668	1:10.219	1:12.321	9
10	81	(Australia) Oscar Piastri	McLaren-Mercedes	1:10.519	1:10.330	No time	10
11	27	(Germany) Nico Hülkenberg	Haas-Ferrari	1:10.475	1:10.547	N/A	11
12	31	(France) Esteban Ocon	Alpine-Renault	1:10.763	1:10.562	N/A	14^{a}
13	10	(France) Pierre Gasly	Alpine-Renault	1:10.793	1:10.567	N/A	15^{a}
14	20	(Denmark) Kevin Magnussen	Haas-Ferrari	1:10.602	1:10.723	N/A	12
15	23	(Thailand) Alexander Albon	Williams-Mercedes	1:10.621	1:10.840	N/A	13
16	22	(Japan) Yuki Tsunoda	AlphaTauri-Honda RBPT	1:10.837	N/A	N/A	16
17	3	(Australia) Daniel Ricciardo	AlphaTauri-Honda RBPT	1:10.843	N/A	N/A	17
18	77	(Finland) Valtteri Bottas	Alfa Romeo-Ferrari	1:10.955	N/A	N/A	18
19	2	(United States) Logan Sargeant	Williams-Mercedes	1:11.035	N/A	N/A	19
20	24	(China) Zhou Guanyu	Alfa Romeo-Ferrari	1:11.275	N/A	N/A	20
107% time: 1:15.263

Notes

- ^a – George Russell, Esteban Ocon, and Pierre Gasly each received two-place grid penalties for impeding other drivers at the pit exit in Q1.

== Sprint shootout ==
The sprint shootout was held on 4 November 2023, at 11:00 local time (UTC−3), and determined the starting grid for the sprint.

=== Sprint shootout report ===
Lando Norris topped the timing sheets for the second and third segments, granting him a sprint pole position. In SQ1, Esteban Ocon seemingly lost control of his Alpine and drove into Fernando Alonso, sending Ocon's Alpine A523 straight into the wall and breaking Alonso's front left suspension. Alonso was unable to return for the rest of the shootout despite Aston Martin's efforts to fix his car in time for SQ2.

=== Sprint shootout classification ===
Pos.	No.	Driver	Constructor	Qualifying times			Sprint grid
Pos.	No.	Driver	Constructor	SQ1	SQ2	SQ3	Sprint grid
1	4	(United Kingdom) Lando Norris	McLaren-Mercedes	1:11.824	1:11.221	1:10.622	1
2	1	(Netherlands) Max Verstappen	Red Bull Racing-Honda RBPT	1:11.888	1:11.262	1:10.683	2
3	11	(Mexico) Sergio Pérez	Red Bull Racing-Honda RBPT	1:12.218	1:11.230	1:10.756	3
4	63	(United Kingdom) George Russell	Mercedes	1:11.976	1:11.516	1:10.857	4
5	44	(United Kingdom) Lewis Hamilton	Mercedes	1:11.870	1:11.476	1:10.940	5
6	22	(Japan) Yuki Tsunoda	AlphaTauri-Honda RBPT	1:12.358	1:11.676	1:11.019	6
7	16	(Monaco) Charles Leclerc	Ferrari	1:12.107	1:11.473	1:11.077	7
8	3	(Australia) Daniel Ricciardo	AlphaTauri-Honda RBPT	1:12.175	1:11.423	1:11.122	8
9	55	(Spain) Carlos Sainz Jr.	Ferrari	1:11.796	1:11.491	1:11.126	9
10	81	(Australia) Oscar Piastri	McLaren-Mercedes	1:12.356	1:11.648	1:11.189	10
11	20	(Denmark) Kevin Magnussen	Haas-Ferrari	1:12.058	1:11.727	N/A	11
12	27	(Germany) Nico Hülkenberg	Haas-Ferrari	1:12.136	1:11.752	N/A	12
13	10	(France) Pierre Gasly	Alpine-Renault	1:12.229	1:11.822	N/A	13
14	77	(Finland) Valtteri Bottas	Alfa Romeo-Ferrari	1:12.303	1:11.872	N/A	14
15	14	(Spain) Fernando Alonso	Aston Martin Aramco-Mercedes	1:12.224	No time	N/A	15
16	31	(France) Esteban Ocon	Alpine-Renault	1:12.388	N/A	N/A	16
17	18	(Canada) Lance Stroll	Aston Martin Aramco-Mercedes	1:12.482	N/A	N/A	17
18	24	(China) Zhou Guanyu	Alfa Romeo-Ferrari	1:12.497	N/A	N/A	18
19	23	(Thailand) Alexander Albon	Williams-Mercedes	1:12.525	N/A	N/A	19
20	2	(United States) Logan Sargeant	Williams-Mercedes	1:12.615	N/A	N/A	20
107% time: 1:16.821

== Sprint ==
The sprint was held on 4 November 2023, at 15:30 local time (UTC−3), and was run for 24 laps.

=== Sprint report ===
After overtaking sprint polesitter Lando Norris for the lead in the opening turn, Max Verstappen won the sprint. Sergio Pérez finished in third, his first podium of any kind since the Italian Grand Prix.

=== Sprint classification ===
Pos.	No.	Driver	Constructor	Laps	Time/Retired	Grid	Points
1	1	(Netherlands) Max Verstappen	Red Bull Racing-Honda RBPT	24	30:07.209	2	8
2	4	(United Kingdom) Lando Norris	McLaren-Mercedes	24	+4.287	1	7
3	11	(Mexico) Sergio Pérez	Red Bull Racing-Honda RBPT	24	+13.617	3	6
4	63	(United Kingdom) George Russell	Mercedes	24	+25.879	4	5
5	16	(Monaco) Charles Leclerc	Ferrari	24	+28.560	7	4
6	22	(Japan) Yuki Tsunoda	AlphaTauri-Honda RBPT	24	+29.210	6	3
7	44	(United Kingdom) Lewis Hamilton	Mercedes	24	+34.726	5	2
8	55	(Spain) Carlos Sainz Jr.	Ferrari	24	+35.106	9	1
9	3	(Australia) Daniel Ricciardo	AlphaTauri-Honda RBPT	24	+35.303	8	
10	81	(Australia) Oscar Piastri	McLaren-Mercedes	24	+38.219	10	
11	14	(Spain) Fernando Alonso	Aston Martin Aramco-Mercedes	24	+39.061	15	
12	18	(Canada) Lance Stroll	Aston Martin Aramco-Mercedes	24	+39.478	17	
13	10	(France) Pierre Gasly	Alpine-Renault	24	+40.421	13	
14	31	(France) Esteban Ocon	Alpine-Renault	24	+42.848	16	
15	23	(Thailand) Alexander Albon	Williams-Mercedes	24	+43.394	19	
16	20	(Denmark) Kevin Magnussen	Haas-Ferrari	24	+56.507	11	
17	24	(China) Zhou Guanyu	Alfa Romeo-Ferrari	24	+58.723	18	
18	27	(Germany) Nico Hülkenberg	Haas-Ferrari	24	+1:00.330	12	
19	77	(Finland) Valtteri Bottas	Alfa Romeo-Ferrari	24	+1:00.749	14	
20	2	(United States) Logan Sargeant	Williams-Mercedes	24	+1:00.945	20	
Fastest lap: (United Kingdom) George Russell (Mercedes) – 1:14.422 (lap 2)

== Race ==
The race was held on 5 November 2023, at 14:00 local time (UTC−3), and was run for 71 laps.

=== Race report ===
Charles Leclerc crashed out of the race during the formation lap due to a hydraulics problem. Lando Norris moved up to second behind Max Verstappen at the start, while Kevin Magnussen hit Alexander Albon before the first turn, taking both drivers out of the race. The amount of debris caused a safety car period; soon, the race was red-flagged. Oscar Piastri and Daniel Ricciardo both suffered damage to their cars due to hitting the debris from the crash, but had their cars fixed in time to restart from the pit lane, albeit one lap down.

Off of the standing restart, Verstappen kept his first place ahead of Norris and, after a few more laps, pulled further ahead. Sergio Pérez overtook Lewis Hamilton, who was struggling with his tyres. Both Alfa Romeo drivers retired due to car problems: Zhou Guanyu on lap 24 and Valtteri Bottas on lap 39. On lap 57, George Russell retired due to overheating. With their cars continuing to struggle from the first-lap damage, Ricciardo and Piastri finished one and two laps down, respectively.

Sergio Pérez and Fernando Alonso dueled for third for many laps, with Alonso overtaking Pérez for the final time on the last lap and defending against the Red Bull Racing driver to take his first podium since the Dutch Grand Prix, ahead of Pérez by 0.053 seconds. This was his ninth podium at Interlagos without ever winning and his first since the 2013 Brazilian Grand Prix.

Verstappen won the race by eight seconds, ahead of Norris. In doing so, Verstappen claimed the highest percentage of race wins per season record from Alberto Ascari, a record held since the 1952 season; he also achieved his nineteenth podium of the season, breaking his own record from 2021. Verstappen also overtook Alain Prost in total race wins by reaching his 52nd win.

=== Race classification ===
Pos.	No.	Driver	Constructor	Laps	Time/Retired	Grid	Points
1	1	(Netherlands) Max Verstappen	Red Bull Racing-Honda RBPT	71	1:56:48.894	1	25
2	4	(United Kingdom) Lando Norris	McLaren-Mercedes	71	+8.277	6	19^{b}
3	14	(Spain) Fernando Alonso	Aston Martin Aramco-Mercedes	71	+34.155	4	15
4	11	(Mexico) Sergio Pérez	Red Bull Racing-Honda RBPT	71	+34.208	9	12
5	18	(Canada) Lance Stroll	Aston Martin Aramco-Mercedes	71	+40.845	3	10
6	55	(Spain) Carlos Sainz Jr.	Ferrari	71	+50.188	7	8
7	10	(France) Pierre Gasly	Alpine-Renault	71	+56.093	15	6
8	44	(United Kingdom) Lewis Hamilton	Mercedes	71	+1:02.859	5	4
9	22	(Japan) Yuki Tsunoda	AlphaTauri-Honda RBPT	71	+1:09.880	16	2
10	31	(France) Esteban Ocon	Alpine-Renault	70	+1 lap	14	1
11	2	(United States) Logan Sargeant	Williams-Mercedes	70	+1 lap	19	
12	27	(Germany) Nico Hülkenberg	Haas-Ferrari	70	+1 lap	11	
13	3	(Australia) Daniel Ricciardo	AlphaTauri-Honda RBPT	70	+1 lap	17	
14	81	(Australia) Oscar Piastri	McLaren-Mercedes	69	+2 laps	10	
Ret	63	(United Kingdom) George Russell	Mercedes	57	Oil temperature	8	
Ret	77	(Finland) Valtteri Bottas	Alfa Romeo-Ferrari	39	Hydraulics	18	
Ret	24	(China) Zhou Guanyu	Alfa Romeo-Ferrari	22	Engine	20	
Ret	20	(Denmark) Kevin Magnussen	Haas-Ferrari	0	Collision	12	
Ret	23	(Thailand) Alexander Albon	Williams-Mercedes	0	Collision	13	
DNS	16	(Monaco) Charles Leclerc	Ferrari	0	Hydraulics	–^{c}	
Fastest lap: (United Kingdom) Lando Norris (McLaren-Mercedes) – 1:12.486 (lap 61)

Notes

- ^b – Includes one point for fastest lap.
- ^c – Charles Leclerc did not start the race due to a hydraulics failure resulting in a crash during the formation lap. His place on the grid was left vacant.

== Championship standings after the race ==
Drivers' Championship standings

	Pos.	Driver	Points
	1	(Netherlands) **Max Verstappen**	524
	2	(Mexico) Sergio Pérez	258
	3	(United Kingdom) Lewis Hamilton	226
1	4	(Spain) Fernando Alonso	198
1	5	(United Kingdom) Lando Norris	195

Constructors' Championship standings

Pos.	Constructor	Points
1	(Austria) **Red Bull Racing-Honda RBPT**	782
2	(Germany) Mercedes	382
3	(Italy) Ferrari	362
4	(United Kingdom) McLaren-Mercedes	282
5	(United Kingdom) Aston Martin Aramco-Mercedes	261

- Note: Only the top five positions are included for both sets of standings.
- Competitors in bold are the 2023 World Champions.

Previous race: 2023 Mexico City Grand Prix	FIA Formula One World Championship; 2023 season	Next race: 2023 Las Vegas Grand Prix
Previous race: 2022 São Paulo Grand Prix	São Paulo Grand Prix	Next race: 2024 São Paulo Grand Prix
