= 2025 São Paulo Grand Prix =

Twenty-first round of the 2025 F1 season

Race 21 of 24 in the 2025 Formula One World Championship
← Previous race	Next race →
- Layout of the Autódromo José Carlos Pace

Race details
- Date: 9 November 2025
- Official name: Formula 1 MSC Cruises Grande Prêmio de São Paulo 2025
- Location: Autódromo José Carlos Pace; São Paulo, Brazil
- Course: Permanent racing facility
- Course length: 4.309 km (2.677 miles)
- Distance: 71 laps, 305.879 km (190.064 miles)
- Weather: Cloudy
- Attendance: 303,627

Pole position
Driver	(United Kingdom) Lando Norris	McLaren-Mercedes
- Time: 1:09.511

Fastest lap
Driver	(Thailand) Alexander Albon	Williams-Mercedes
- Time: 1:12.400 on lap 59

Podium
First	(United Kingdom) Lando Norris	McLaren-Mercedes
Second	(Italy) Kimi Antonelli	Mercedes
Third	(Netherlands) Max Verstappen	Red Bull Racing-Honda RBPT

The 2025 São Paulo Grand Prix (officially known as the Formula 1 MSC Cruises Grande Prêmio de São Paulo 2025) was a Formula One motor race held on 9 November 2025 at the Interlagos Circuit in São Paulo, Brazil. It was the twenty-first round of the 2025 Formula One World Championship and the fifth of six Grands Prix in the season to utilise the sprint format. Lando Norris of McLaren took pole position for the sprint and main race, converting them both to wins. In the sprint, the podium was completed by Mercedes drivers Kimi Antonelli and George Russell. The podium of the main race was completed by Antonelli and Red Bull's Max Verstappen, the latter having started from the pit lane.

After taking his seventh victory of the season, Norris extended his lead in the Drivers' Championship to 24 points over Piastri, with Verstappen a further 25 points adrift in third. While McLaren increased its total to 798 points in the Constructors' Championship, Ferrari was demoted from second to fourth following their second double retirement of the season, allowing Mercedes and Red Bull to move up to second and third, respectively.

== Background ==
The São Paulo Grand Prix was held at the Interlagos Circuit in São Paulo for the 5th time in the circuit's history, having previously held thirty-seven editions of the Brazilian Grand Prix, across the weekend of 7–9 November. The Grand Prix was the twenty-first round of the 2025 Formula One World Championship and the fifth held under the name of the São Paulo Grand Prix, having previously been titled the Brazilian Grand Prix. It was also the fifth of six Grands Prix in the season to utilise the sprint format and the fifth time overall that the São Paulo Grand Prix featured it.

=== Championship standings before the race ===
Going into the weekend, Lando Norris led the Drivers' Championship with 357 points, one point ahead of teammate Oscar Piastri in second, and 36 points ahead of Max Verstappen. McLaren, who won the Constructors' Championship at the Singapore Grand Prix, were ahead of Ferrari and Mercedes, who were second and third with 356 and 355 points, respectively.

=== Entrants ===
The drivers and teams were the same as published in the season entry list with three exceptions; Yuki Tsunoda at Red Bull Racing held the seat originally occupied by Liam Lawson before Lawson was demoted back to Racing Bulls from the Japanese Grand Prix onward, and Franco Colapinto replaced Jack Doohan at Alpine from the Emilia Romagna Grand Prix onward on a race-by-race basis.

=== Tyre choices ===
Tyre supplier Pirelli brought the C2, C3, and C4 tyre compounds designated hard, medium, and soft, respectively, for teams to use at the event, a step harder than the previous year.

== Practice ==
The sole free practice session was held on 7 November 2025, and was scheduled to start at 11:30 local time (UTC−3) before being delayed to 11:35. The session was topped by Lando Norris followed by his teammate Oscar Piastri and Nico Hülkenberg.

== Sprint qualifying ==
Sprint qualifying was held on 7 November 2025, at 15:30 local time (UTC−3), and determined the starting grid order for the sprint.

=== Sprint qualifying report ===
Sprint qualifying consisted of three sessions, with the five drivers with the worst lap times being eliminated following each of the first two sessions. For the first two sessions, new medium tyres were mandated, while the third and final session allowed teams to use any set of soft tyres.

In the twelve-minute long first session (SQ1), Franco Colapinto, Liam Lawson, Yuki Tsunoda, Esteban Ocon, and Carlos Sainz Jr. were eliminated. During the second session (SQ2), which lasted for ten minutes, Lewis Hamilton, Alexander Albon, Pierre Gasly, Gabriel Bortoleto and Oliver Bearman were eliminated.

The third session (SQ3) lasted for eight minutes, and determined the final order of the remaining ten drivers. Lando Norris took pole position; Kimi Antonelli finished in second, with championship contender Oscar Piastri finishing in third. George Russell and Fernando Alonso finished in fourth and fifth, respectively, and Max Verstappen, Lance Stroll, Charles Leclerc, Isack Hadjar, and Nico Hülkenberg completed the rest of the top ten.

=== Sprint qualifying classification ===
Pos.	No.	Driver	Constructor	Qualifying times			Sprint grid
Pos.	No.	Driver	Constructor	SQ1	SQ2	SQ3	Sprint grid
1	4	(United Kingdom) Lando Norris	McLaren-Mercedes	1:09.627	1:09.373	1:09.243	1
2	12	(Italy) Kimi Antonelli	Mercedes	1:10.381	1:09.504	1:09.340	2
3	81	(Australia) Oscar Piastri	McLaren-Mercedes	1:10.017	1:09.416	1:09.428	3
4	63	(United Kingdom) George Russell	Mercedes	1:10.048	1:09.384	1:09.495	4
5	14	(Spain) Fernando Alonso	Aston Martin Aramco-Mercedes	1:10.011	1:09.330	1:09.496	5
6	1	(Netherlands) Max Verstappen	Red Bull Racing-Honda RBPT	1:09.975	1:09.707	1:09.580	6
7	18	(Canada) Lance Stroll	Aston Martin Aramco-Mercedes	1:10.326	1:09.647	1:09.671	7
8	16	(Monaco) Charles Leclerc	Ferrari	1:10.324	1:09.732	1:09.725	8
9	6	(France) Isack Hadjar	Racing Bulls-Honda RBPT	1:10.095	1:09.608	1:09.775	9
10	27	(Germany) Nico Hülkenberg	Kick Sauber-Ferrari	1:10.333	1:09.735	1:09.935	10
11	44	(United Kingdom) Lewis Hamilton	Ferrari	1:10.224	1:09.811	N/A	11
12	23	(Thailand) Alexander Albon	Williams-Mercedes	1:10.275	1:09.813	N/A	12
13	10	(France) Pierre Gasly	Alpine-Renault	1:10.097	1:09.852	N/A	13
14	5	(Brazil) Gabriel Bortoleto	Kick Sauber-Ferrari	1:10.217	1:09.923	N/A	14
15	87	(United Kingdom) Oliver Bearman	Haas-Ferrari	1:10.066	1:09.946	N/A	15
16	43	(Argentina) Franco Colapinto	Alpine-Renault	1:10.441	N/A	N/A	16
17	30	(New Zealand) Liam Lawson	Racing Bulls-Honda RBPT	1:10.666	N/A	N/A	17
18	22	(Japan) Yuki Tsunoda	Red Bull Racing-Honda RBPT	1:10.692	N/A	N/A	PL^{1}
19	31	(France) Esteban Ocon	Haas-Ferrari	1:10.872	N/A	N/A	18
20	55	(Spain) Carlos Sainz Jr.	Williams-Mercedes	1:11.120	N/A	N/A	PL^{1}
107% time: 1:14.500

Notes

- ^1 – Yuki Tsunoda and Carlos Sainz Jr. qualified 18th and 20th, respectively, but were required to start the sprint from the pit lane as their cars were modified under parc fermé conditions.

== Sprint ==
The sprint was held on 8 November 2025, at 11:00 local time (UTC−3), and was run for 24 laps.

=== Sprint report ===
Lando Norris converted pole position to a sprint victory ahead of Kimi Antonelli and George Russell. Norris's teammate Oscar Piastri and Franco Colapinto both crashed out at the same corner on lap six, which brought out the red flag. Nico Hülkenberg hit the same barrier, but the team was able to fix the car. On lap 23, Gabriel Bortoleto crashed on the pit straight while chasing Alexander Albon, inflicting extensive damage to his car. After bottoming out while attempting to brake for the first turn, Bortoleto hit the pit wall, which briefly sent him airborne. Sliding across the track, he then hit the wall by the Senna Esses, and he came to a stop at the run-off area. Bortoleto was unhurt, but he was taken to the medical centre for checks – after which he was cleared – and his car required a rebuild that meant he was not able to take part in qualifying.

=== Sprint classification ===
Pos.	No.	Driver	Constructor	Laps	Time/Retired	Grid	Points
1	4	(United Kingdom) Lando Norris	McLaren-Mercedes	24	53:25.928	1	8
2	12	(Italy) Kimi Antonelli	Mercedes	24	+0.845	2	7
3	63	(United Kingdom) George Russell	Mercedes	24	+2.318	4	6
4	1	(Netherlands) Max Verstappen	Red Bull Racing-Honda RBPT	24	+4.423	6	5
5	16	(Monaco) Charles Leclerc	Ferrari	24	+16.483	8	4
6	14	(Spain) Fernando Alonso	Aston Martin Aramco-Mercedes	24	+18.306	5	3
7	44	(United Kingdom) Lewis Hamilton	Ferrari	24	+18.603	11	2
8	10	(France) Pierre Gasly	Alpine-Renault	24	+19.366	13	1
9	18	(Canada) Lance Stroll	Aston Martin Aramco-Mercedes	24	+23.933	7	
10	6	(France) Isack Hadjar	Racing Bulls-Honda RBPT	24	+29.548	9	
11	31	(France) Esteban Ocon	Haas-Ferrari	24	+31.000	18	
12	87	(United Kingdom) Oliver Bearman	Haas-Ferrari	24	+36.334^{1}	15	
13	22	(Japan) Yuki Tsunoda	Red Bull Racing-Honda RBPT	24	+38.462	PL	
14	55	(Spain) Carlos Sainz Jr.	Williams-Mercedes	24	+38.951	PL	
15	27	(Germany) Nico Hülkenberg	Kick Sauber-Ferrari	24	+42.349	10	
16	30	(New Zealand) Liam Lawson	Racing Bulls-Honda RBPT	24	+43.090^{2}	17	
17	23	(Thailand) Alexander Albon	Williams-Mercedes	24	+55.456	12	
18^{3}	5	(Brazil) Gabriel Bortoleto	Kick Sauber-Ferrari	23	Accident	14	
Ret	81	(Australia) Oscar Piastri	McLaren-Mercedes	5	Accident	3	
Ret	43	(Argentina) Franco Colapinto	Alpine-Renault	5	Accident	16	

Notes

- ^1 – Oliver Bearman received a post-sprint five-second time penalty for driving in a manner deemed potentially dangerous on the straight. His final position was not affected by the penalty.
- ^2 – Liam Lawson finished 13th on track, but received a post-sprint five-second time penalty for causing a collision with Oliver Bearman.
- ^3 – Gabriel Bortoleto was classified as he completed more than 90% of the sprint distance.

== Qualifying ==
Qualifying was held on 8 November 2025, and was scheduled to start at 15:00 local time (UTC−3) before being delayed to 15:05. It determined the starting grid order for the main race.

=== Qualifying classification ===
Pos.	No.	Driver	Constructor	Qualifying times			Final grid
Pos.	No.	Driver	Constructor	Q1	Q2	Q3	Final grid
1	4	(United Kingdom) Lando Norris	McLaren-Mercedes	1:09.656	1:09.616	1:09.511	1
2	12	(Italy) Kimi Antonelli	Mercedes	1:10.192	1:09.774	1:09.685	2
3	16	(Monaco) Charles Leclerc	Ferrari	1:09.934	1:09.801	1:09.805	3
4	81	(Australia) Oscar Piastri	McLaren-Mercedes	1:09.928	1:09.835	1:09.886	4
5	6	(France) Isack Hadjar	Racing Bulls-Honda RBPT	1:10.083	1:09.970	1:09.931	5
6	63	(United Kingdom) George Russell	Mercedes	1:09.935	1:09.880	1:09.942	6
7	30	(New Zealand) Liam Lawson	Racing Bulls-Honda RBPT	1:10.108	1:09.950	1:09.962	7
8	87	(United Kingdom) Oliver Bearman	Haas-Ferrari	1:09.891	1:09.755	1:09.977	8
9	10	(France) Pierre Gasly	Alpine-Renault	1:09.885	1:09.857	1:10.002	9
10	27	(Germany) Nico Hülkenberg	Kick Sauber-Ferrari	1:10.337	1:09.985	1:10.039	10
11	14	(Spain) Fernando Alonso	Aston Martin Aramco-Mercedes	1:10.181	1:10.001	N/A	11
12	23	(Thailand) Alexander Albon	Williams-Mercedes	1:10.115	1:10.053	N/A	12
13	44	(United Kingdom) Lewis Hamilton	Ferrari	1:10.016	1:10.100	N/A	13
14	18	(Canada) Lance Stroll	Aston Martin Aramco-Mercedes	1:10.041	1:10.161	N/A	14
15	55	(Spain) Carlos Sainz Jr.	Williams-Mercedes	1:10.184	1:10.472	N/A	15
16	1	(Netherlands) Max Verstappen	Red Bull Racing-Honda RBPT	1:10.403	N/A	N/A	PL^{1}
17	31	(France) Esteban Ocon	Haas-Ferrari	1:10.438	N/A	N/A	PL^{1}
18	43	(Argentina) Franco Colapinto	Alpine-Renault	1:10.632	N/A	N/A	16
19	22	(Japan) Yuki Tsunoda	Red Bull Racing-Honda RBPT	1:10.711	N/A	N/A	17
107% time: 1:14.531
—	5	(Brazil) Gabriel Bortoleto	Kick Sauber-Ferrari	No time	N/A	N/A	18^{2}

Notes

- ^1 – Max Verstappen and Esteban Ocon qualified 16th and 17th, respectively, but were required to start the race from the pit lane for exceeding their quota of power unit elements and replacing them under parc fermé conditions.
- ^2 – Gabriel Bortoleto failed to set a time during qualifying. He was permitted to race at the stewards' discretion.

== Race ==
The race was held on 9 November 2025, at 14:00 local time (UTC−3), and was run for 71 laps.

=== Race report ===
Lando Norris held the lead through the Senna S as Gabriel Bortoleto crashed out of his home Grand Prix after contact with Lance Stroll, bringing out the safety car. Ferrari driver Lewis Hamilton made contact with Carlos Sainz Jr.'s Williams before hitting the rear of Franco Colapinto's Alpine, forcing Hamilton into the pit lane and resulting in floor damage; he reported issues with downforce and rear stability, and retired on lap 37.

As the safety car was withdrawn, Oscar Piastri locked up into Kimi Antonelli's Mercedes, which sent him into the Ferrari of Charles Leclerc. This tore a tyre off of Leclerc's car. By this point, pit lane starter Max Verstappen was in thirteenth, but a puncture to the front-left hard tyre forced him to switch to medium tyres. By lap 9 and the conclusion of the virtual safety car period, Piastri was in second place, but would soon receive a ten-second penalty for his role in the Antonelli collision. Similarly, a ten-second penalty for Yuki Tsunoda followed for causing a collision with Stroll, and another was granted after improperly serving it.

By lap 56, Verstappen was fourth, behind both Mercedes cars. George Russell had to manage his brake temperature, so he started to lift and coast; Verstappen passed him for third. He encountered Antonelli, who defended second place to mark his highest Formula One career finish at the time. Norris won the race by ten seconds, and Piastri finished in fifth.

After taking his seventh Grand Prix victory of the season, Norris extended his lead in the Drivers' Championship to 24 points over Piastri, with Verstappen a further 25 points adrift in third. The result also meant that Russell was mathematically eliminated from championship contention, leaving only the top three with chances of winning the Drivers' Championship with three races (including the final sprint in Qatar) to go. While McLaren increased its total to 798 points in the Constructors' Championship, Ferrari was demoted from second to fourth following their second double retirement of the season, allowing Mercedes and Red Bull to move up to second and third, respectively.

=== Race classification ===
Pos.	No.	Driver	Constructor	Laps	Time/Retired	Grid	Points
1	4	(United Kingdom) Lando Norris	McLaren-Mercedes	71	1:32:01.596	1	25
2	12	(Italy) Kimi Antonelli	Mercedes	71	+10.388	2	18
3	1	(Netherlands) Max Verstappen	Red Bull Racing-Honda RBPT	71	+10.750	PL	15
4	63	(United Kingdom) George Russell	Mercedes	71	+15.267	6	12
5	81	(Australia) Oscar Piastri	McLaren-Mercedes	71	+15.749	4	10
6	87	(United Kingdom) Oliver Bearman	Haas-Ferrari	71	+29.630	8	8
7	30	(New Zealand) Liam Lawson	Racing Bulls-Honda RBPT	71	+52.642	7	6
8	6	(France) Isack Hadjar	Racing Bulls-Honda RBPT	71	+52.873	5	4
9	27	(Germany) Nico Hülkenberg	Kick Sauber-Ferrari	71	+53.324	10	2
10	10	(France) Pierre Gasly	Alpine-Renault	71	+53.914	9	1
11	23	(Thailand) Alexander Albon	Williams-Mercedes	71	+54.184	12	
12	31	(France) Esteban Ocon	Haas-Ferrari	71	+54.696	PL	
13	55	(Spain) Carlos Sainz Jr.	Williams-Mercedes	71	+55.420	15	
14	14	(Spain) Fernando Alonso	Aston Martin Aramco-Mercedes	71	+55.766	11	
15	43	(Argentina) Franco Colapinto	Alpine-Renault	71	+57.777	16	
16	18	(Canada) Lance Stroll	Aston Martin Aramco-Mercedes	71	+58.247	14	
17	22	(Japan) Yuki Tsunoda	Red Bull Racing-Honda RBPT	71	+1:09.176	17	
Ret	44	(United Kingdom) Lewis Hamilton	Ferrari	37	Collision damage	13	
Ret	16	(Monaco) Charles Leclerc	Ferrari	5	Collision	3	
Ret	5	(Brazil) Gabriel Bortoleto	Kick Sauber-Ferrari	0	Accident	18	

== Championship standings after the race ==
Drivers' Championship standings

Pos.	Driver	Points
1	(United Kingdom) **Lando Norris***	390
2	(Australia) **Oscar Piastri***	366
3	(Netherlands) **Max Verstappen***	341
4	(United Kingdom) George Russell	276
5	(Monaco) Charles Leclerc	214

Constructors' Championship standings

	Pos.	Constructor	Points
	1	(United Kingdom) **McLaren-Mercedes***	756
1	2	(Germany) Mercedes	398
1	3	(Austria) Red Bull Racing-Honda RBPT	366
2	4	(Italy) Ferrari	362
	5	(United Kingdom) Williams-Mercedes	111

- Note: Only the top five positions are included for both sets of standings.
- Competitor marked in bold and with an asterisk still has a theoretical chance of becoming World Champion.

Previous race: 2025 Mexico City Grand Prix	FIA Formula One World Championship; 2025 season	Next race: 2025 Las Vegas Grand Prix
Previous race: 2024 São Paulo Grand Prix	São Paulo Grand Prix	Next race: 2026 São Paulo Grand Prix
