= 2024 São Paulo Grand Prix =

Twenty-first round of the 2024 F1 season

Race 21 of 24 in the 2024 Formula One World Championship
← Previous race	Next race →
- Layout of the Autódromo José Carlos Pace

Race details
- Date: 3 November 2024
- Official name: Formula 1 Lenovo Grande Prêmio de São Paulo 2024
- Location: Autódromo José Carlos Pace; São Paulo, Brazil
- Course: Permanent racing facility
- Course length: 4.309 km (2.677 miles)
- Distance: 69 laps, 297.261 km (184.709 miles)
- Scheduled distance: 71 laps, 305.879 km (190.064 miles)
- Weather: Rain
- Attendance: 291,717

Pole position
Driver	(United Kingdom) Lando Norris	McLaren-Mercedes
- Time: 1:23.405

Fastest lap
Driver	(Netherlands) Max Verstappen	Red Bull Racing-Honda RBPT
- Time: 1:20.472 on lap 67

Podium
First	(Netherlands) Max Verstappen	Red Bull Racing-Honda RBPT
Second	(France) Esteban Ocon	Alpine-Renault
Third	(France) Pierre Gasly	Alpine-Renault

The 2024 São Paulo Grand Prix (officially known as the Formula 1 Lenovo Grande Prêmio de São Paulo 2024) was a Formula One motor race that was held on 3 November 2024 at the Interlagos Circuit in São Paulo, Brazil. It was the twenty-first round of the 2024 Formula One World Championship and the fifth Grand Prix weekend of the season to utilise the sprint format.

Oscar Piastri of McLaren took pole position for the sprint event, and then ceded position to his teammate Lando Norris in the closing laps of the sprint. Norris won his first sprint race ahead of Piastri and Charles Leclerc of Ferrari. Max Verstappen of Red Bull Racing initially finished third, but was later penalised for a virtual safety car infringement, ultimately taking fourth place. Norris took pole position for the main race in a qualifying session disrupted by five red flags, ahead of George Russell of Mercedes and Yuki Tsunoda of RB, who qualified in a career-best third.

The wet-weather race was won by Max Verstappen of Red Bull Racing, who qualified in 12th place but started 17th after being handed a five-place grid penalty for exceeding his allocation of power unit components, taking both his and Red Bull's first win since the Spanish Grand Prix. His victory in tricky conditions is considered one of his greatest drives. The podium was completed by Esteban Ocon and Pierre Gasly of Alpine with the two achieving Team Enstone's first double podium finish since the 2013 Korean Grand Prix with Kimi Räikkönen and Romain Grosjean. This also marked the first time since Räikkönen's win at the 2005 Japanese Grand Prix that a driver had won from 17th – or lower – on the grid.

== Background ==
The event was held at the Interlagos Circuit in São Paulo for the 41st time in the circuit's history, having previously held thirty-seven editions of the Brazilian Grand Prix, across the weekend of 1–3 November. The Grand Prix was the twenty-first round of the 2024 Formula One World Championship and the fourth held under the name of the São Paulo Grand Prix, having previously been titled the Brazilian Grand Prix. It was also the fifth of six Grands Prix in the season to utilise the sprint format and the fourth time overall that the São Paulo Grand Prix featured it.

=== Championship standings before the race ===
Going into the weekend, Max Verstappen led the Drivers' Championship with 362 points, 47 points ahead of Lando Norris in second, and 71 ahead of Charles Leclerc in third. McLaren, holding 566 points, entered this round as the leader of the Constructors' Championship from Ferrari and Red Bull Racing, who were second and third with 537 and 512 points, respectively.

=== Entrants ===
The drivers and teams were initially the same as the season entry list with two exceptions: Franco Colapinto, who replaced Logan Sargeant at Williams from the Italian Grand Prix onwards, and Liam Lawson, who replaced Daniel Ricciardo at RB from the United States Grand Prix. Reserve driver Oliver Bearman replaced Kevin Magnussen at Haas for the free practice and sprint sessions as Magnussen felt unwell. This was later expanded to the rest of the weekend following sprint qualifying. Alexander Albon of Williams did not take part in the race as his car was not repaired in time following a heavy crash during qualifying.

=== Tyre choices ===
Tyre supplier Pirelli brought the C3, C4, and C5 tyre compounds (the softest three in their range) designated hard, medium, and soft, respectively, for teams to use at the event.

== Practice ==
The only free practice session was held on 1 November 2024, at 11:30 local time (UTC−3), and was topped by Lando Norris of McLaren ahead of George Russell of Mercedes and Oliver Bearman of Haas.

== Sprint qualifying ==
Sprint qualifying was held on 1 November 2024, at 15:30 local time (UTC−3), and determined the starting grid order for the sprint.

=== Sprint qualifying classification ===
Pos.	No.	Driver	Constructor	Qualifying times			Sprint grid
Pos.	No.	Driver	Constructor	SQ1	SQ2	SQ3	Sprint grid
1	81	(Australia) Oscar Piastri	McLaren-Mercedes	1:10.265	1:09.239	1:08.899	1
2	4	(United Kingdom) Lando Norris	McLaren-Mercedes	1:09.477	1:09.063	1:08.928	2
3	16	(Monaco) Charles Leclerc	Ferrari	1:10.388	1:09.248	1:09.153	3
4	1	(Netherlands) Max Verstappen	Red Bull Racing-Honda RBPT	1:10.409	1:09.489	1:09.219	4
5	55	(Spain) Carlos Sainz Jr.	Ferrari	1:10.503	1:09.500	1:09.257	5
6	63	(United Kingdom) George Russell	Mercedes	1:10.479	1:09.683	1:09.443	6
7	10	(France) Pierre Gasly	Alpine-Renault	1:10.630	1:09.610	1:09.622	7
8	30	(New Zealand) Liam Lawson	RB-Honda RBPT	1:10.576	1:09.827	1:09.941	8
9	23	(Thailand) Alexander Albon	Williams-Mercedes	1:10.366	1:09.844	1:10.078	9
10	50	(United Kingdom) Oliver Bearman	Haas-Ferrari	1:10.442	1:09.629	No time	10
11	44	(United Kingdom) Lewis Hamilton	Mercedes	1:10.625	1:09.941	N/A	11
12	27	(Germany) Nico Hülkenberg	Haas-Ferrari	1:10.466	1:09.964	N/A	12
13	11	(Mexico) Sergio Pérez	Red Bull Racing-Honda RBPT	1:10.392	1:10.024	N/A	13
14	43	(Argentina) Franco Colapinto	Williams-Mercedes	1:10.470	1:10.275	N/A	14
15	77	(Finland) Valtteri Bottas	Kick Sauber-Ferrari	1:10.861	1:10.595	N/A	15
16	14	(Spain) Fernando Alonso	Aston Martin Aramco-Mercedes	1:10.978	N/A	N/A	PL (Note: Fernando Alonso, Lance Stroll and Zhou Guanyu qualified 16th, 19th and 20th, respectively, but were required to start the sprint from the pit lane as their cars were modified under parc fermé conditions.)
17	31	(France) Esteban Ocon	Alpine-Renault	1:11.052	N/A	N/A	16
18	22	(Japan) Yuki Tsunoda	RB-Honda RBPT	1:11.121	N/A	N/A	17
19	18	(Canada) Lance Stroll	Aston Martin Aramco-Mercedes	1:11.280	N/A	N/A	PL
20	24	(China) Zhou Guanyu	Kick Sauber-Ferrari	1:12.978	N/A	N/A	PL
107% time: 1:14.340

== Sprint ==
The sprint was held on 2 November 2024, at 11:00 local time (UTC−3), and was run for 24 laps.

=== Sprint report ===
The sprint was held in cloudy conditions, facilitating the usage of slick tyres. Sprint polesitter Oscar Piastri led the majority of the race, but ceded position to Lando Norris to allow his teammate to maximise his points for his championship fight. Both drivers were being trailed by Max Verstappen of Red Bull Racing, who had already overtaken Charles Leclerc of Ferrari. On lap 19, a double-waved yellow flag was observed due to Nico Hülkenberg's smoking Haas, who had a mechanical problem with three laps to go, so the McLaren pit wall ordered the drivers to swap positions on lap 22 should the race end under the safety car; McLaren initially planned for the two drivers to swap late in the race, and Piastri was willing to swap positions to aid his teammate. A late virtual safety car was called out shortly after the two drivers swapped positions and after Hülkenberg had vacated his car, and ended on the dying moments of the final lap. Other than Hülkenberg's mechanical failure, there were no major incidents on track. Norris won his first sprint race event ahead of Piastri and Verstappen, who finished third on track, but the latter was placed under investigation following the sprint for a virtual safety car infringement. Verstappen was demoted to fourth after being given a five-second time penalty, and Leclerc inherited third in his place.

=== Sprint classification ===
Pos.	No.	Driver	Constructor	Laps	Time/Retired	Grid	Points
1	4	(United Kingdom) Lando Norris	McLaren-Mercedes	24	29:46.045	2	8
2	81	(Australia) Oscar Piastri	McLaren-Mercedes	24	+0.593	1	7
3	16	(Monaco) Charles Leclerc	Ferrari	24	+5.656	3	6
4	1	(Netherlands) Max Verstappen	Red Bull Racing-Honda RBPT	24	+6.497 (Note: Max Verstappen finished third on track, but received a post-sprint five-second time penalty for a virtual safety car infringement.)	4	5
5	55	(Spain) Carlos Sainz Jr.	Ferrari	24	+7.224	5	4
6	63	(United Kingdom) George Russell	Mercedes	24	+12.475	6	3
7	10	(France) Pierre Gasly	Alpine-Renault	24	+18.161	7	2
8	11	(Mexico) Sergio Pérez	Red Bull Racing-Honda RBPT	24	+18.717	13	1
9	30	(New Zealand) Liam Lawson	RB-Honda RBPT	24	+20.773	8	
10	23	(Thailand) Alexander Albon	Williams-Mercedes	24	+24.606	9	
11	44	(United Kingdom) Lewis Hamilton	Mercedes	24	+29.764	11	
12	43	(Argentina) Franco Colapinto	Williams-Mercedes	24	+33.233	14	
13	31	(France) Esteban Ocon	Alpine-Renault	24	+34.128	16	
14	50	(United Kingdom) Oliver Bearman	Haas-Ferrari	24	+35.507	10	
15	22	(Japan) Yuki Tsunoda	RB-Honda RBPT	24	+41.374	17	
16	77	(Finland) Valtteri Bottas	Kick Sauber-Ferrari	24	+43.231	15	
17	24	(China) Zhou Guanyu	Kick Sauber-Ferrari	24	+54.139	PL	
18	14	(Spain) Fernando Alonso	Aston Martin Aramco-Mercedes	24	+56.537	PL	
19	18	(Canada) Lance Stroll	Aston Martin Aramco-Mercedes	24	+57.983	PL	
Ret	27	(Germany) Nico Hülkenberg	Haas-Ferrari	19	Gearbox	12	
Fastest lap: (Mexico) Sergio Pérez (Red Bull Racing-Honda RBPT) – 1:11.678 (lap 24)

== Qualifying ==
Qualifying was scheduled to be held on 2 November 2024, at 15:00 local time (UTC−3), but was postponed to the following day, at 07:30 local time, due to adverse weather conditions. The session determined the starting grid order for the main race.

=== Qualifying report ===
The postponement of qualifying marked the first time in over five years that qualifying was held on the race day, which last occurred at the 2019 Japanese Grand Prix.

Lando Norris took pole position for the race ahead of George Russell and Yuki Tsunoda, the latter achieving his highest Grand Prix start to date. The qualifying session was beset by rain, and had five separate red flags, due to the crashes of Franco Colapinto, Carlos Sainz Jr., Lance Stroll, Fernando Alonso, and Alexander Albon. The latter's crash ruled him out of the race, due to Williams already having had repair work done on Colapinto's car, and Sainz opted to start from the pit lane. The session tied the record for most red flags during qualifying at the time, with the 2022 Emilia Romagna Grand Prix's qualifying session also having five red flags.

=== Qualifying classification ===
Pos.	No.	Driver	Constructor	Qualifying times			Final grid
Pos.	No.	Driver	Constructor	Q1	Q2	Q3	Final grid
1	4	(United Kingdom) Lando Norris	McLaren-Mercedes	1:30.944	1:24.844	1:23.405	1
2	63	(United Kingdom) George Russell	Mercedes	1:29.121	1:26.307	1:23.578	2
3	22	(Japan) Yuki Tsunoda	RB-Honda RBPT	1:29.172	1:26.464	1:24.111	3
4	31	(France) Esteban Ocon	Alpine-Renault	1:29.171	1:26.206	1:24.475	4
5	30	(New Zealand) Liam Lawson	RB-Honda RBPT	1:30.758	1:25.654	1:24.484	5
6	16	(Monaco) Charles Leclerc	Ferrari	1:29.839	1:26.097	1:24.525	6
7	23	(Thailand) Alexander Albon	Williams-Mercedes	1:29.072	1:25.889	1:24.657	7
8	81	(Australia) Oscar Piastri	McLaren-Mercedes	1:30.114	1:25.179	1:24.686	8
9	14	(Spain) Fernando Alonso	Aston Martin Aramco-Mercedes	1:30.207	1:25.035	1:28.998	9
10	18	(Canada) Lance Stroll	Aston Martin Aramco-Mercedes	1:30.580	1:26.334	No time	10
11	77	(Finland) Valtteri Bottas	Kick Sauber-Ferrari	1:30.633	1:26.472	N/A	11
12	1	(Netherlands) Max Verstappen	Red Bull Racing-Honda RBPT	1:28.522	1:27.771	N/A	17 (Note: Max Verstappen received a five-place grid penalty for a sixth internal combustion engine.)
13	11	(Mexico) Sergio Pérez	Red Bull Racing-Honda RBPT	1:30.035	1:28.158	N/A	12
14	55	(Spain) Carlos Sainz Jr.	Ferrari	1:30.303	1:29.406	N/A	PL (Note: Carlos Sainz Jr. qualified 14th, but was required to start the race from the pit lane for replacing power unit elements and gearbox without the approval of the technical delegate during parc fermé.)
15	10	(France) Pierre Gasly	Alpine-Renault	1:29.420	1:29.614	N/A	13
16	44	(United Kingdom) Lewis Hamilton	Mercedes	1:31.150	N/A	N/A	14
17	50	(United Kingdom) Oliver Bearman	Haas-Ferrari	1:31.229	N/A	N/A	15
18	43	(Argentina) Franco Colapinto	Williams-Mercedes	1:31.270	N/A	N/A	16
19	27	(Germany) Nico Hülkenberg	Haas-Ferrari	1:31.623	N/A	N/A	18
20	24	(China) Zhou Guanyu	Kick Sauber-Ferrari	1:32.263	N/A	N/A	19
107% time: 1:34.718 (Note: As qualifying was held on a wet track, the 107% rule was not in force.)

== Race ==
The race was scheduled to be held on 3 November 2024, at 14:00 local time (UTC−3), but was moved to 12:30 local time due to the weather forecast. The race was scheduled to run for 71 laps before being shortened by two laps due to an aborted start procedure.

=== Race report ===
The race was held in rainy conditions on a wet track, following on from the qualifying session. All cars used intermediate wet or full wet tyres. Since Alexander Albon did not start the race, his grid slot was left vacant; Carlos Sainz Jr. started from the pit lane. On the formation lap, Aston Martin driver Lance Stroll spun, made contact with the wall, and then beached his car in a gravel trap, meaning he did not start the race. With Stroll beached in the gravel, the race director displayed the aborted start message. Polesitter Lando Norris, Liam Lawson, Yuki Tsunoda, and George Russell misinterpreted this message from race control and erroneously left the grid to perform an additional formation lap. Separately both Mercedes drivers Russell and Hamilton were under investigation due to Mercedes changing the tyre pressures of both cars with the wheels still on the car. Ultimately, fines were issued for Russell, Norris, and the Mercedes team.

The third formation lap began thirteen minutes after the first. At the race start, Russell passed Norris off the line. After starting from the seventeenth grid slot, Max Verstappen of Red Bull Racing recovered eleven places by lap 12, up to sixth. On lap 27, Nico Hülkenberg of Haas spun off at the first corner. He was helped back onto the track by marshals, and was later shown the black flag, disqualifying him from the race. This marked the first time since the 2007 Canadian Grand Prix where a driver was black flagged during a race. Hülkenberg's incident triggered a virtual safety car on lap 28, and Russell and Norris pitted in response, allowing Esteban Ocon, Verstappen, and Pierre Gasly to move ahead.

Track conditions worsened as the rain intensified after the race was resumed. On lap 30, Norris passed Russell for the effective lead of the race as both drivers slowly approached turn 4, and the safety car was deployed shortly after due to the lack of visibility. At this point, only five drivers had put on the full wet tyres, with Yuki Tsunoda setting the best times among the field in sixth place. On lap 32, still under the safety car period, Franco Colapinto crashed his Williams heavily between turns 13 and 14, bringing out the red flag and delaying the session further. As a result, Ocon, Verstappen, and Gasly were able to change tyres during the red flag period, effectively jumping Norris and Russell.

After the restart, Ocon retained the lead and pulled a small margin over Verstappen, while Norris made a mistake and went off the track. Ocon held the lead until Carlos Sainz Jr. crashed on lap 39, bringing out the safety car. On the next restart, Verstappen quickly passed Ocon, going on to open a big lead by setting the fastest lap on 17 different occasions. His title rival Norris fell to seventh place following the restart after locking up into turn 1 and going off the track again. While teammate Oscar Piastri would give him sixth place, he would make no further progress for the rest of the race.

The race was won by Verstappen, 19 seconds ahead of Ocon and Gasly. This was the third race to be won from 17th on the grid. Ocon and Gasly's double podium was Alpine's first of the season. This also marked the first podium for both the Alpine team and a Renault powered car since the 2023 Dutch Grand Prix. The result extended Verstappen's drivers championship lead to 62 points with a maximum of 86 points still remaining over the final three rounds. In the Constructors' Championship, Alpine more than tripled their points total from 16 points to 49, improving their position from ninth to sixth, ahead of Haas with 46 points, RB with 44 points, and Williams with 17 points.

=== Race classification ===
Pos.	No.	Driver	Constructor	Laps (Note: The race distance was scheduled to be completed for 71 laps before being shortened by two laps due to an aborted start procedure.)	Time/Retired	Grid	Points
1	1	(Netherlands) Max Verstappen	Red Bull Racing-Honda RBPT	69	2:06:54.430	17	26 (Note: Includes one point for fastest lap.)
2	31	(France) Esteban Ocon	Alpine-Renault	69	+19.477	4	18
3	10	(France) Pierre Gasly	Alpine-Renault	69	+22.532	13	15
4	63	(United Kingdom) George Russell	Mercedes	69	+23.265	2	12
5	16	(Monaco) Charles Leclerc	Ferrari	69	+30.177	6	10
6	4	(United Kingdom) Lando Norris	McLaren-Mercedes	69	+31.372	1	8
7	22	(Japan) Yuki Tsunoda	RB-Honda RBPT	69	+42.056	3	6
8	81	(Australia) Oscar Piastri	McLaren-Mercedes	69	+44.943 (Note: Oscar Piastri finished seventh, but received a ten-second time penalty for causing a collision with Liam Lawson.)	8	4
9	30	(New Zealand) Liam Lawson	RB-Honda RBPT	69	+50.452	5	2
10	44	(United Kingdom) Lewis Hamilton	Mercedes	69	+50.753	14	1
11	11	(Mexico) Sergio Pérez	Red Bull Racing-Honda RBPT	69	+51.531	12	
12	50	(United Kingdom) Oliver Bearman	Haas-Ferrari	69	+57.085	15	
13	77	(Finland) Valtteri Bottas	Kick Sauber-Ferrari	69	+1:03.588	11	
14	14	(Spain) Fernando Alonso	Aston Martin Aramco-Mercedes	69	+1:18.049	9	
15	24	(China) Zhou Guanyu	Kick Sauber-Ferrari	69	+1:19.649	19	
Ret	55	(Spain) Carlos Sainz Jr.	Ferrari	38	Accident	PL	
Ret	43	(Argentina) Franco Colapinto	Williams-Mercedes	30	Accident	16	
DNS	23	(Thailand) Alexander Albon	Williams-Mercedes	0	Car damaged	— (Note: Alexander Albon did not start the race as his car was not repaired in time following a heavy crash in qualifying. His place on the grid was left vacant.)	
DNS	18	(Canada) Lance Stroll	Aston Martin Aramco-Mercedes	0	Accident	— (Note: Lance Stroll did not start the race as he beached his car during the formation lap. His place on the grid was left vacant.)	
DSQ	27	(Germany) Nico Hülkenberg	Haas-Ferrari	30	Outside assistance (Note: Nico Hülkenberg was disqualified after receiving assistance from marshals to rejoin the track after a spin at turn 1.)	18	
Fastest lap: (Netherlands) Max Verstappen (Red Bull Racing-Honda RBPT) – 1:20.472 (lap 67)

== Championship standings after the race ==
Drivers' Championship standings

Pos.	Driver	Points
1	(Netherlands) **Max Verstappen***	393
2	(United Kingdom) **Lando Norris***	331
3	(Monaco) Charles Leclerc	307
4	(Australia) Oscar Piastri	262
5	(Spain) Carlos Sainz Jr.	244

Constructors' Championship standings

Pos.	Constructor	Points
1	(United Kingdom) **McLaren-Mercedes***	593
2	(Italy) **Ferrari***	557
3	(Austria) **Red Bull Racing–Honda RBPT***	544
4	(Germany) Mercedes	382
5	(United Kingdom) Aston Martin Aramco-Mercedes	86

- Note: Only the top five positions are included for both sets of standings.
- Competitor marked in bold and with an asterisk still has a theoretical chance of becoming World Champion.

Previous race: 2024 Mexico City Grand Prix	FIA Formula One World Championship; 2024 season	Next race: 2024 Las Vegas Grand Prix
Previous race: 2023 São Paulo Grand Prix	São Paulo Grand Prix	Next race: 2025 São Paulo Grand Prix
