= 2018 Brazilian Grand Prix =

Race 20 of 21 in the 2018 Formula One World Championship
← Previous race	Next race →
- Layout of the Autódromo José Carlos Pace

Race details
- Date: 11 November 2018
- Official name: Formula 1 Grande Prêmio Heineken do Brasil 2018
- Location: Autódromo José Carlos Pace, São Paulo, Brazil
- Course: Permanent racing facility
- Course length: 4.309 km (2.677 miles)
- Distance: 71 laps, 305.879 km (190.064 miles)
- Weather: Cloudy

Pole position
Driver	(United Kingdom) Lewis Hamilton	Mercedes
- Time: 1:07.281

Fastest lap
Driver	(Finland) Valtteri Bottas	Mercedes
- Time: 1:10.540 on lap 65 (lap record)

Podium
First	(United Kingdom) Lewis Hamilton	Mercedes
Second	(Netherlands) Max Verstappen	Red Bull Racing-TAG Heuer
Third	(Finland) Kimi Räikkönen	Ferrari

The 2018 Brazilian Grand Prix (formally known as the Formula 1 Grande Prêmio Heineken do Brasil 2018) was a Formula One motor race held on 11 November 2018 at the Autódromo José Carlos Pace in São Paulo, Brazil. The race was the twentieth and penultimate round of the 2018 Formula One World Championship and marked the 47th running of the Brazilian Grand Prix and the 46th time that the race was run as a World Championship event since the inaugural event in 1973. Following Felipe Massa's retirement from Formula One at the end of the 2017 season, this marked the first Brazilian Grand Prix where no Brazilian driver took part.

The race was won by Lewis Hamilton from pole position. Hamilton's race win combined with teammate Valtteri Bottas finishing 5th meant that Mercedes were able to claim the Constructors' Championship for the 5th consecutive season. Kimi Räikkönen finished 3rd for Ferrari, taking his 103rd and final podium of his career as well as his final for the team.

== Background ==
Going into the penultimate round of the 2018 season Lewis Hamilton had already claimed the Drivers' Championship, however Ferrari and Mercedes could both still claim the Constructors' Championship. Ferrari needed to outscore Mercedes by 13 points or more to prevent Mercedes winning the title after the race's completion.

== Qualifying ==
=== Qualifying classification ===
Pos.	No.	Driver	Constructor	Qualifying times			Final grid
Pos.	No.	Driver	Constructor	Q1	Q2	Q3	Final grid
1	44	(United Kingdom) Lewis Hamilton	Mercedes	1:08.464	1:07.795	1:07.281	1
2	5	(Germany) Sebastian Vettel	Ferrari	1:08.452	1:07.776	1:07.374	2
3	77	(Finland) Valtteri Bottas	Mercedes	1:08.492	1:07.727	1:07.441	3
4	7	(Finland) Kimi Räikkönen	Ferrari	1:08.452	1:08.028	1:07.456	4
5	33	(Netherlands) Max Verstappen	Red Bull Racing-TAG Heuer	1:08.205	1:08.017	1:07.778	5
6	3	(Australia) Daniel Ricciardo	Red Bull Racing-TAG Heuer	1:08.544	1:08.055	1:07.780	11^{a}
7	9	(Sweden) Marcus Ericsson	Sauber-Ferrari	1:08.754	1:08.579	1:08.296	6
8	16	(Monaco) Charles Leclerc	Sauber-Ferrari	1:08.667	1:08.335	1:08.492	7
9	8	(France) Romain Grosjean	Haas-Ferrari	1:08.735	1:08.239	1:08.517	8
10	10	(France) Pierre Gasly	Scuderia Toro Rosso-Honda	1:09.046	1:08.616	1:09.029	9
11	20	(Denmark) Kevin Magnussen	Haas-Ferrari	1:08.474	1:08.659		10
12	11	(Mexico) Sergio Pérez	Racing Point Force India-Mercedes	1:09.217	1:08.741		12
13	31	(France) Esteban Ocon	Racing Point Force India-Mercedes	1:09.264	1:08.770		18^{b}
14	27	(Germany) Nico Hülkenberg	Renault	1:09.009	1:08.834		13
15	35	(Russia) Sergey Sirotkin	Williams-Mercedes	1:09.259	1:10.381		14
16	55	(Spain) Carlos Sainz Jr.	Renault	1:09.269			15
17	28	(New Zealand) Brendon Hartley	Scuderia Toro Rosso-Honda	1:09.280			16
18	14	(Spain) Fernando Alonso	McLaren-Renault	1:09.402			17
19	18	(Canada) Lance Stroll	Williams-Mercedes	1:09.441			19
20	2	(Belgium) Stoffel Vandoorne	McLaren-Renault	1:09.601			20
107% time: 1:12.979

Notes

- ^a – Daniel Ricciardo received a five-place grid penalty for a change in turbochargers.
- ^b – Esteban Ocon received a five-place grid penalty for an unscheduled gearbox change.

== Race ==
Max Verstappen was leading and extending his lead over Lewis Hamilton in second until, on lap 44, Esteban Ocon made contact with Verstappen. Ocon was trying to unlap himself, causing both drivers to spin allowing Hamilton to take the lead and eventually the win. Following the collision, the stewards gave Ocon a ten-second stop-go penalty for the incident. With the win by its driver Lewis Hamilton, Mercedes wrapped up the Constructors' Championship, while Max Verstappen's Red Bull finished second and Kimi Räikkönen's Ferrari finished third. Daniel Ricciardo took fourth ahead of Bottas with Vettel struggling home to sixth. Ocon finished 14th.

After the race Max Verstappen pushed and hit Ocon forcefully several times in the chest in the FIA's garage. Verstappen would later be punished for actions that were deemed inappropriate for a sportsman and was punished with two days community service.

=== Race classification ===
Pos.	No.	Driver	Constructor	Laps	Time/Retired	Grid	Points
1	44	(United Kingdom) Lewis Hamilton	Mercedes	71	1:27:09.066	1	25
2	33	(Netherlands) Max Verstappen	Red Bull Racing-TAG Heuer	71	+1.469	5	18
3	7	(Finland) Kimi Räikkönen	Ferrari	71	+4.764	4	15
4	3	(Australia) Daniel Ricciardo	Red Bull Racing-TAG Heuer	71	+5.193	11	12
5	77	(Finland) Valtteri Bottas	Mercedes	71	+22.943	3	10
6	5	(Germany) Sebastian Vettel	Ferrari	71	+26.997	2	8
7	16	(Monaco) Charles Leclerc	Sauber-Ferrari	71	+44.199	7	6
8	8	(France) Romain Grosjean	Haas-Ferrari	71	+51.230	8	4
9	20	(Denmark) Kevin Magnussen	Haas-Ferrari	71	+52.857	10	2
10	11	(Mexico) Sergio Pérez	Racing Point Force India-Mercedes	70	+1 lap	12	1
11	28	(New Zealand) Brendon Hartley	Scuderia Toro Rosso-Honda	70	+1 lap	16	
12	55	(Spain) Carlos Sainz Jr.	Renault	70	+1 lap	15	
13	10	(France) Pierre Gasly	Scuderia Toro Rosso-Honda	70	+1 lap	9	
14	31	(France) Esteban Ocon	Racing Point Force India-Mercedes	70	+1 lap	18	
15	2	(Belgium) Stoffel Vandoorne	McLaren-Renault	70	+1 lap^{1}	20	
16	35	(Russia) Sergey Sirotkin	Williams-Mercedes	69	+2 laps	14	
17	14	(Spain) Fernando Alonso	McLaren-Renault	69	+2 laps^{1}	17	
18	18	(Canada) Lance Stroll	Williams-Mercedes	69	+2 laps	19	
Ret	27	(Germany) Nico Hülkenberg	Renault	32	Overheating	13	
Ret	9	(Sweden) Marcus Ericsson	Sauber-Ferrari	20	Collision damage	6	

Notes

- ^1 – Stoffel Vandoorne and Fernando Alonso each received a five-second time penalty for ignoring blue flags.

== Championship standings after the race ==
Drivers' Championship standings

Pos.	Driver	Points
1	(United Kingdom) **Lewis Hamilton**	383
2	(Germany) Sebastian Vettel	302
3	(Finland) Kimi Räikkönen	251
4	(Finland) Valtteri Bottas	237
5	(Netherlands) Max Verstappen	234

Constructors' Championship standings

Pos.	Constructor	Points
1	(Germany) **Mercedes**	620
2	(Italy) Ferrari	553
3	(Austria) Red Bull Racing-TAG Heuer	392
4	(France) Renault	114
5	(United States) Haas-Ferrari	90

- Note: Only the top five positions are included for both sets of standings.
- **Bold text** indicates the 2018 World Champions.

Previous race: 2018 Mexican Grand Prix	FIA Formula One World Championship; 2018 season	Next race: 2018 Abu Dhabi Grand Prix
Previous race: 2017 Brazilian Grand Prix	Brazilian Grand Prix	Next race: 2019 Brazilian Grand Prix
