= 1972 Brazilian Grand Prix =

Non-championship, Formula One motor race held in Sao Paulo, Brazil

- Non-championship race in the 1972 Formula One season

Race details
- Date: March 30, 1972
- Official name: I Grande Prêmio do Brasil
- Location: Autódromo José Carlos Pace, São Paulo, Brazil
- Course: Permanent racing facility
- Course length: 7.960 km (4.946 miles)
- Distance: 37 laps, 294.520 km (183.002 miles)
- Weather: Partially cloudy and very hot

Pole position
Driver	(Brazil) Emerson Fittipaldi	Lotus-Ford
- Time: 2:32.4

Fastest lap
Driver	(Brazil) Emerson Fittipaldi	Lotus-Ford
- Time: 2:35.2

Podium
First	(Argentina) Carlos Reutemann	Brabham-Ford
Second	(Sweden) Ronnie Peterson	March-Ford
Third	(Brazil) Wilson Fittipaldi	Brabham-Ford

The 1972 Brazilian Grand Prix was a Formula One non-championship race held at Interlagos on 30 March 1972. It was the inaugural Brazilian Grand Prix.

This race was held because at that time the FIA regulations required a demonstration race to be held as a quality check, before a Grand Prix was admitted as a championship race.

== Classification ==
Pos	No	Driver	Team	Laps	Time/Retired	Grid
1	8	(Argentina) Carlos Reutemann	Brabham-Ford	37	1:37:16.248	2
2	10	(Sweden) Ronnie Peterson	March-Ford	37	+1:27.656	3
3	9	(Brazil) Wilson Fittipaldi	Brabham-Ford	37	+2:03.379	4
4	17	(Austria) Helmut Marko	BRM	36	+ 1 Lap	11
5	2	(Australia) Dave Walker	Lotus-Ford	36	+ 1 Lap	5
6	11	(Brazil) Luiz Bueno	March-Ford	35	+ 2 Laps	10
Ret	1	(Brazil) Emerson Fittipaldi	Lotus-Ford	32	Suspension	1
Ret	18	(Spain) Alex Soler-Roig	BRM	32	Suspension	12
Ret	6	(Brazil) Carlos Pace	March-Ford	1	Throttle	7
Ret	5	(France) Henri Pescarolo	March-Ford	0	Throttle	8
Ret	15	(United Kingdom) Peter Gethin	BRM	0	Throttle	9
DNS	14	(France) Jean-Pierre Beltoise	BRM		Ignition	6
DNQ	12	(Italy) Andrea de Adamich	Surtees-Ford			
DNQ	7	(Sweden) Reine Wisell	Surtees-Ford			
WD	3	(Belgium) Jacky Ickx	Ferrari			
WD	4	(Switzerland) Clay Regazzoni	Ferrari			
WD	16	(New Zealand) Howden Ganley	BRM			

== Notes ==
- Fastest lap: Emerson Fittipaldi – 2:35.2

Previous race: 1972 Race of Champions	Formula One non-championship races 1972 season	Next race: 1972 BRDC International Trophy
Previous race: None	Brazilian Grand Prix	Next race: 1973 Brazilian Grand Prix
