= 2016 Brazilian Grand Prix =

Penultimate round of the 2016 Formula One season

Race 20 of 21 in the 2016 Formula One World Championship
← Previous race	Next race →
- Layout of the Autódromo José Carlos Pace

Race details
- Date: 13 November 2016
- Official name: Formula 1 Grande Prêmio do Brasil 2016
- Location: Autódromo José Carlos Pace, São Paulo, Brazil
- Course: Permanent racing facility
- Course length: 4.309 km (2.677 miles)
- Distance: 71 laps, 305.909 km (190.083 miles)
- Weather: Rain and 16 °C (60.8 °F)
- Attendance: 136,410 (Weekend)

Pole position
Driver	(United Kingdom) Lewis Hamilton	Mercedes
- Time: 1:10.736

Fastest lap
Driver	(Netherlands) Max Verstappen	Red Bull Racing-TAG Heuer
- Time: 1:25.305 on lap 67

Podium
First	(United Kingdom) Lewis Hamilton	Mercedes
Second	(Germany) Nico Rosberg	Mercedes
Third	(Netherlands) Max Verstappen	Red Bull Racing-TAG Heuer

The 2016 Brazilian Grand Prix (officially known as the Formula One Grande Prêmio do Brasil 2016) was a Formula One motor race held on 13 November 2016 at the Autódromo José Carlos Pace in São Paulo, Brazil. The race was the 20th and penultimate round of the 2016 FIA Formula One World Championship and marked the 45th running of the Brazilian Grand Prix and the 44th time that the race had been run as a World Championship event since the inaugural season in 1950. At the race duration of a little over 3 hours, the race was the longest Brazilian Grand Prix in history.

Winner of the previous year's race Nico Rosberg entered the round with a 19-point lead over his teammate Lewis Hamilton in the World Drivers' Championship. Their team, Mercedes, had already clinched the World Constructors' Championship, holding a lead of two hundred and fifty-two points over Red Bull Racing, with third place Scuderia Ferrari another sixty-two points behind. Hamilton took pole position and won the race from Rosberg to take the championship to the final round in Abu Dhabi. Max Verstappen finished third, having dropped to 16th after a pit stop with 16 laps to go. In the process, he became the youngest driver at the time to set the fastest lap of a Grand Prix, a record which has since been broken by Kimi Antonelli at the 2025 Japanese Grand Prix.

== Qualifying ==
Pos.	Car no.	Driver	Constructor	Qualifying times			Final grid
Pos.	Car no.	Driver	Constructor	Q1	Q2	Q3	Final grid
1	44	(United Kingdom) Lewis Hamilton	Mercedes	1:11.511	1:11.238	1:10.736	1
2	6	(Germany) Nico Rosberg	Mercedes	1:11.815	1:11.373	1:10.838	2
3	7	(Finland) Kimi Räikkönen	Ferrari	1:12.100	1:12.301	1:11.404	3
4	33	(Netherlands) Max Verstappen	Red Bull Racing-TAG Heuer	1:11.957	1:11.834	1:11.485	4
5	5	(Germany) Sebastian Vettel	Ferrari	1:12.159	1:12.010	1:11.495	5
6	3	(Australia) Daniel Ricciardo	Red Bull Racing-TAG Heuer	1:12.409	1:12.047	1:11.540	6
7	8	(France) Romain Grosjean	Haas-Ferrari	1:12.893	1:12.343	1:11.937	7
8	27	(Germany) Nico Hülkenberg	Force India-Mercedes	1:12.428	1:12.360	1:12.104	8
9	11	(Mexico) Sergio Pérez	Force India-Mercedes	1:12.684	1:12.331	1:12.165	9
10	14	(Spain) Fernando Alonso	McLaren-Honda	1:12.700	1:12.312	1:12.266	10
11	77	(Finland) Valtteri Bottas	Williams-Mercedes	1:12.680	1:12.420		11
12	21	(Mexico) Esteban Gutiérrez	Haas-Ferrari	1:13.052	1:12.431		12
13	19	(Brazil) Felipe Massa	Williams-Mercedes	1:12.432	1:12.521		13
14	26	(Russia) Daniil Kvyat	Toro Rosso-Ferrari	1:13.071	1:12.726		14
15	55	(Spain) Carlos Sainz Jr.	Toro Rosso-Ferrari	1:12.950	1:12.920		15
16	30	(United Kingdom) Jolyon Palmer	Renault	1:13.259	1:13.258		16
17	22	(United Kingdom) Jenson Button	McLaren-Honda	1:13.276			17
18	20	(Denmark) Kevin Magnussen	Renault	1:13.410			18
19	94	(Germany) Pascal Wehrlein	MRT-Mercedes	1:13.427			19
20	31	(France) Esteban Ocon	MRT-Mercedes	1:13.432			22^{1}
21	9	(Sweden) Marcus Ericsson	Sauber-Ferrari	1:13.623			20
22	12	(Brazil) Felipe Nasr	Sauber-Ferrari	1:13.681			21
107% time: 1:16.516

Notes

- ^1 – Esteban Ocon received a three-place grid penalty for impeding Jolyon Palmer during Q1.

== Race ==
The track was very wet at the start so the race began behind the safety car until the start of Lap 8. Lewis Hamilton built up an early lead. Marcus Ericsson crashed on lap 13 on the pit straight bringing the safety car back out again. The race restarted again six laps later only for Kimi Räikkönen to crash on the pit straight immediately, spinning across the track before hitting the wall. The race was red flagged and there was a 35-minute delay before restarting again behind the safety car, however seven laps later it was again red flagged as the conditions were deemed still too dangerous.

After another 25-minute delay, the race started again behind the safety car, which finally pulled in after another three laps. Late on in the race, Felipe Massa crashed near the pit entry, bringing the safety car out again. While walking back to the garage, Massa received applause from several teams and was visibly emotional, as it was expected to be his last Grand Prix in his home country. (Note: Massa had initially announced his retirement but would race again in 2017.)

The race restarted again and Hamilton went on to win the race from Championship leader Nico Rosberg and Max Verstappen.

=== Race classification ===
Pos.	No.	Driver	Constructor	Laps	Time/Retired	Grid	Points
1	44	(United Kingdom) Lewis Hamilton	Mercedes	71	3:01:01.335	1	25
2	6	(Germany) Nico Rosberg	Mercedes	71	+11.455	2	18
3	33	(Netherlands) Max Verstappen	Red Bull Racing-TAG Heuer	71	+21.481	4	15
4	11	(Mexico) Sergio Pérez	Force India-Mercedes	71	+25.346	9	12
5	5	(Germany) Sebastian Vettel	Ferrari	71	+26.334	5	10
6	55	(Spain) Carlos Sainz Jr.	Toro Rosso-Ferrari	71	+29.160	15	8
7	27	(Germany) Nico Hülkenberg	Force India-Mercedes	71	+29.827	8	6
8	3	(Australia) Daniel Ricciardo	Red Bull Racing-TAG Heuer	71	+30.486^{1}	6	4
9	12	(Brazil) Felipe Nasr	Sauber-Ferrari	71	+42.620	21	2
10	14	(Spain) Fernando Alonso	McLaren-Honda	71	+44.432	10	1
11	77	(Finland) Valtteri Bottas	Williams-Mercedes	71	+45.292	11	
12	31	(France) Esteban Ocon	MRT-Mercedes	71	+45.809	22	
13	26	(Russia) Daniil Kvyat	Toro Rosso-Ferrari	71	+51.192	14	
14	20	(Denmark) Kevin Magnussen	Renault	71	+51.555	18	
15	94	(Germany) Pascal Wehrlein	MRT-Mercedes	71	+1:00.498	19	
16	22	(United Kingdom) Jenson Button	McLaren-Honda	71	+1:21.994	17	
Ret	21	(Mexico) Esteban Gutiérrez	Haas-Ferrari	60	Electrical	12	
Ret	19	(Brazil) Felipe Massa	Williams-Mercedes	46	Accident^{2}	13	
Ret	30	(United Kingdom) Jolyon Palmer	Renault	20	Collision damage	16	
Ret	7	(Finland) Kimi Räikkönen	Ferrari	19	Accident	3	
Ret	9	(Sweden) Marcus Ericsson	Sauber-Ferrari	11	Accident	20	
DNS	8	(France) Romain Grosjean	Haas-Ferrari	0	Accident	—^{3}	

Notes

- ^1 – Daniel Ricciardo received a 5-second penalty for entering the pit lane when the entry was closed. He served this penalty during a subsequent pit stop.
- ^2 – Felipe Massa received a 5-second penalty for overtaking before the safety car line. The penalty made no difference as he retired.
- ^3 – Romain Grosjean crashed on the way from the pit lane to the starting grid.

== Championship standings after the race ==
Drivers' Championship standings

	Pos.	Driver	Points
	1	(Germany) **Nico Rosberg***	367
	2	(United Kingdom) **Lewis Hamilton***	355
	3	(Australia) Daniel Ricciardo	246
	4	(Germany) Sebastian Vettel	197
1	5	(Netherlands) Max Verstappen	192

Constructors' Championship standings

Pos.	Constructor	Points
1	(Germany) **Mercedes**	722
2	(Austria) Red Bull Racing-TAG Heuer	446
3	(Italy) Ferrari	375
4	Force India-Mercedes	163
5	(United Kingdom) Williams-Mercedes	136

- Note: Only the top five positions are included for the sets of standings.
- **Bold text** indicates the 2016 World Constructors' Champions.
- **Bold text** and an asterisk indicates who still had a theoretical chance of becoming World Champion.

== Notes ==
Previous race: 2016 Mexican Grand Prix	FIA Formula One World Championship; 2016 season	Next race: 2016 Abu Dhabi Grand Prix
Previous race: 2015 Brazilian Grand Prix	Brazilian Grand Prix	Next race: 2017 Brazilian Grand Prix
