= Brazilian Grand Prix =

Auto race held in Brazil

Brazilian Grand Prix São Paulo Grand Prix
- Autódromo José Carlos Pace

Race information
- Number of times held: 54
- First held: 1972
- Most wins (drivers): (France) Alain Prost (6)
- Most wins (constructors): (United Kingdom) McLaren (14)
- Circuit length: 4.309 km (2.677 miles)
- Race length: 305.879 km (190.064 miles)
- Laps: 71

Last race (2026)

Pole position
- (United Kingdom) Lando Norris; McLaren-Mercedes; 1:27.470

Podium
- 1. (United Kingdom) L. Norris; McLaren-Mercedes; 1:35:23.504; 2. (Netherlands) M. Verstappen; Red Bull Racing-Red Bull Ford; +14.602; 3. (France) I. Hadjar; Red Bull Racing-Red Bull Ford; +24.485

Fastest lap
- (Italy) Kimi Antonelli; Mercedes; 1:12.689

The Brazilian Grand Prix (Portuguese: Grande Prêmio do Brasil), currently held under the name São Paulo Grand Prix (Portuguese: Grande Prêmio de São Paulo), is a Formula One championship race which is currently held at the Autódromo José Carlos Pace in Interlagos neighborhood, Cidade Dutra, São Paulo. The inaugural Brazilian Grand Prix, held in 1972, was held as a non-championship event, with all races from the 1973 Brazilian Grand Prix onwards held as a championship event. Previously, the race was held at Jacarepaguá from 1978 to 1989, before returning to Interlagos in 1990, where it has since been held.

== Origins ==
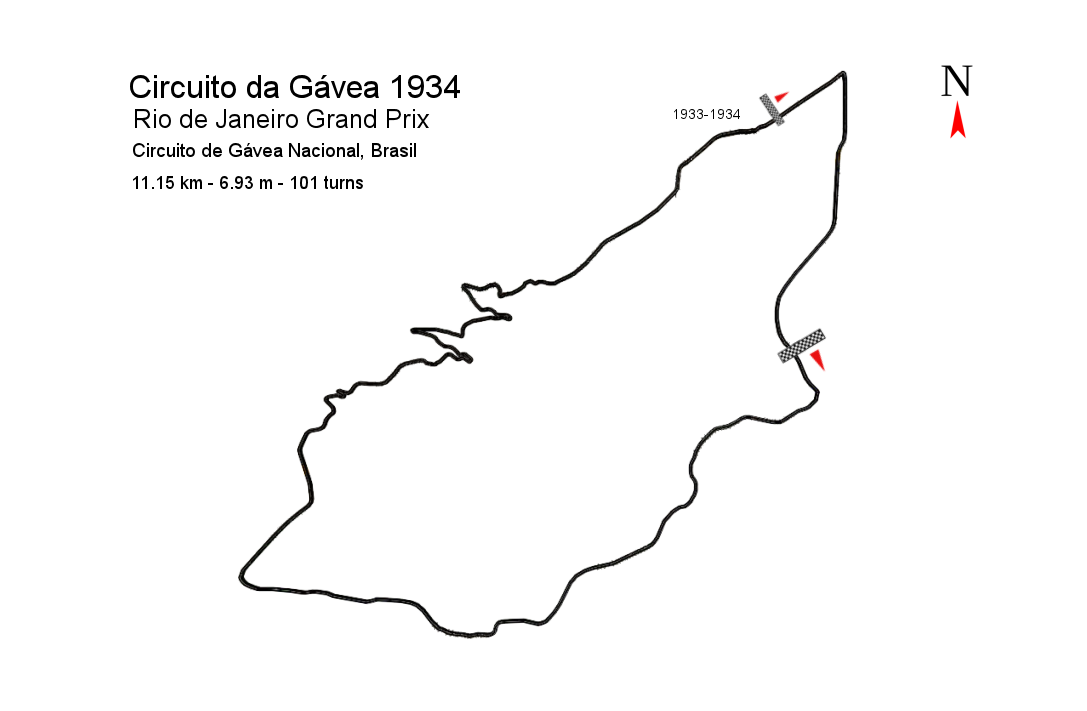
Circuito da Gávea 1934

Motor racing started in Brazil before World War II, with races on the 11.161 km (6.935 mi) Gávea street circuit in Rio de Janeiro starting in 1934. In 1936 construction began on Brazil's first permanent autodrome in the São Paulo neighborhood of Interlagos and was finished in 1940. Brazil held Grands Prix during the early parts of WWII at Interlagos and Gavea. Interlagos, a circuit inspired in layout by the Roosevelt Raceway in the United States quickly gained a reputation as being a tough and demanding circuit with many challenging corners, elevation changes, a rough surface, and little room for error.

== Formula One ==
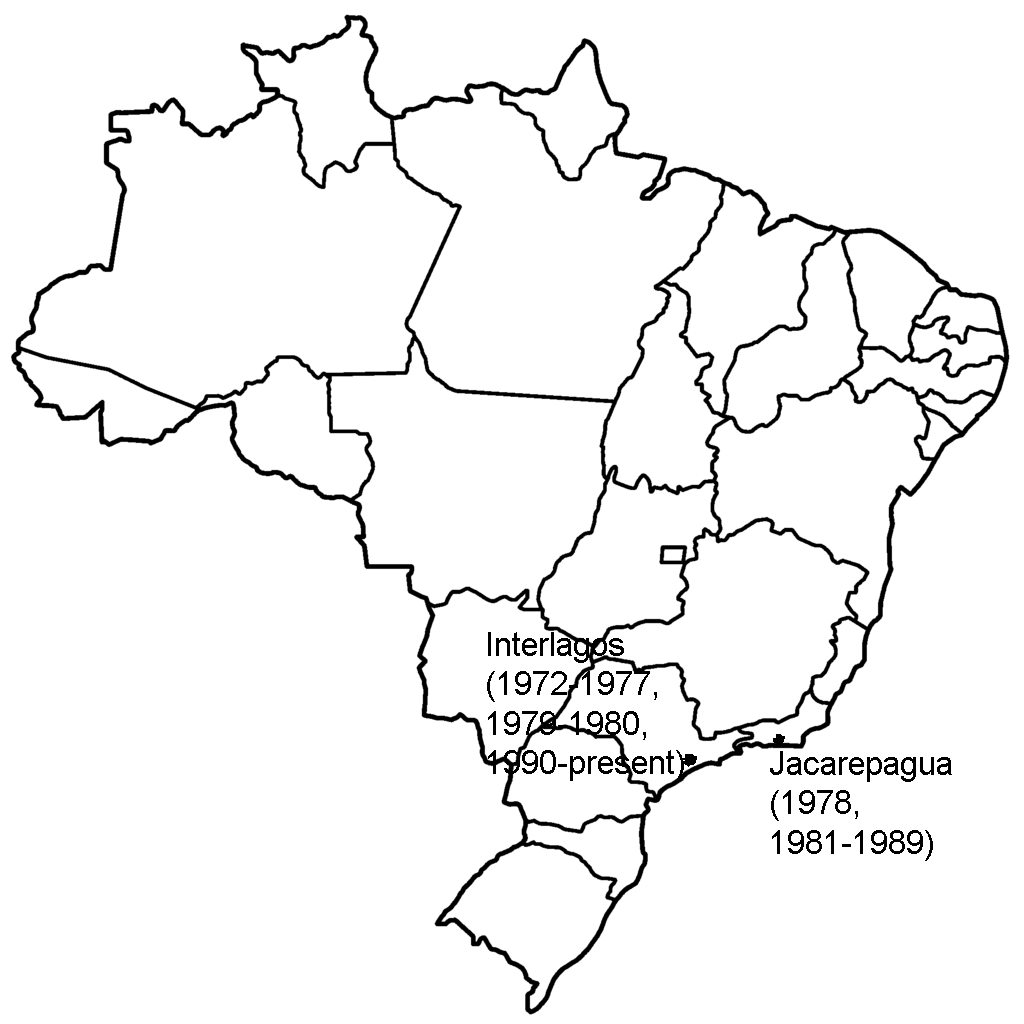
A map of all the locations of the Brazilian Grand Prix

=== Interlagos, São Paulo ===
A Brazilian Grand Prix was first held in 1972 at Interlagos, although it was not part of the Formula One World Championship. Typical of European motorsports at the time, this race was done as a test to convince the FIA if the Interlagos circuit and its organizers could capably hold a Grand Prix. Like most major circuits used for Grands Prix in Latin America such as the Hermanos Rodríguez Autodrome in Mexico City, Interlagos was (and still is) located in the confines of a sprawling urban neighborhood in a very large city. The following year, however, the race was first included in the official calendar, and it was won by defending world champion and São Paulo native Emerson Fittipaldi. In 1974, Fittipaldi won again in rain soaked conditions, and the year after, another São Paulo native, Carlos Pace, won the race in his Brabham, followed by Fittipaldi. 1977 was won by Reutemann, but the drivers began complaining about Interlagos's very rough surface, and the event was then relocated for a year to the new Jacarepaguá circuit in Rio de Janeiro.

After a year in Rio, the race returned to Interlagos, with new and upgraded facilities for the next two seasons; this race was won by Jacques Laffite to complete his and Ligier's conquest of the opening South American rounds in Argentina and Brazil. But the Interlagos surface was still very bumpy. The original arrangement from 1978 onwards was to alternate the Brazilian Grand Prix between the São Paulo and Rio circuits; the 1980 race was originally supposed to be held at Jacarepaguá but parts of that circuit (which was originally built on a swamp) were beginning to sink into the soft ground and the circuit disintegrated badly, so the 1980 Grand Prix was to be relocated to Interlagos. But by this time, the population of São Paulo had risen from 5 to 8 million over the space of 10 years; the area surrounding the track was becoming increasingly run-down and the circuit did not look good for Formula One, which thanks to worldwide television exposure was becoming something of a glamorous spectacle. Formula One was originally supposed to come back to Interlagos for the 1981 season after the track surface there had been repaved; it turned out that F1 came back a year too early. The drivers were dissatisfied with the safety conditions of the very bumpy 7.873 km (4.892 mi) Interlagos circuit which had not been changed after the previous year's improvements. The ground-effect wing cars of that year had a tendency to bounce up and down thanks to the suction created by the cars' wing-shaped underbodies, and they were more stiffly suspended than before; so these fragile cars were barely tolerant of such a rough track and were very unpleasant to drive. The bad surface was so rough that the bumps caused mechanical problems for some cars. Also, the barriers and catch-fence arrangements were not adequate enough for Formula One. Jody Scheckter attempted to stop the race from going ahead but this did not work and the race ended up being won by Frenchman René Arnoux. With Formula One's more glamorous image being better suited to the better-looking city of Rio de Janeiro, the F1 circus went back to Rio again and the circuit went on to host the 1980s turbo era.

=== Jacarepaguá, Rio de Janeiro ===
In 1978 the Brazilian Grand Prix moved to Jacarepaguá in Rio de Janeiro. Argentine Carlos Reutemann dominated in his Ferrari, which was equipped with Michelin tyres. This proved to be the French company's first victory in Formula One. Reutemann was followed by home favorite Fittipaldi and defending champion Niki Lauda.

After the emergence in 1980 of Rio de Janeiro racer Nelson Piquet, the decline of Interlagos and the retirement of Fittipaldi, Brazilian fans lobbied to host the Brazilian GP in Piquet's home town. The flat Jacarepaguá circuit, like Interlagos before it, proved to be extremely demanding: most corners were long and fast, some were slightly banked and the track had a very abrasive surface. Due to the FIA calendar, which invariably had the Brazilian GP at the beginning of the season thus in the Southern hemisphere summer and the tropical weather of Rio, most races were held under very high temperatures and high humidity. Due to all of those circumstances, Grands Prix at Rio were highly demanding and most drivers who won it were exhausted in the end.

In 1981, Carlos Reutemann disobeyed team orders to let his teammate Alan Jones by and took the victory (the only time it rained during the Rio race); the following year Piquet finished first and Keke Rosberg finished second but because of the FISA–FOCA war, Piquet and Rosberg were both disqualified for being underweight of minimum required in post-race scrutineering, and the race victory was given to third placed Alain Prost, who would go on to win at Jacarepaguá four more times (thus earning the nickname "the King of Rio"). The race also saw Italian Riccardo Patrese retire due to physical exhaustion (a very rare occurrence in F1, but quite common at Rio). Piquet won in 1983 and 1986, and the 1988 race was particularly notable, as up-and-coming star Ayrton Senna started from the pit-lane in his first race for McLaren; he began a furious charge that brought him up to second behind his teammate Prost; but he was disqualified for switching to his spare car after the parade lap had begun. The 1989 event was the last race at Jacarepaguá. It was won by British driver Nigel Mansell in his Ferrari, in the first Grand Prix won by a car with a semi-automatic gearbox, and it also saw German Bernd Schneider and American Eddie Cheever collide, and Cheever collapsed twice after he exited his car due to exhaustion.

=== Return to a new Interlagos (1990–2019, 2021–present) ===
Driven by the Formula 1 success of São Paulo native Ayrton Senna, city officials undertook a $15 million investment of renovation of the Interlagos track to shorten and re-surface the track. In 1990, the Brazilian Grand Prix returned to the shortened, reconfigured Interlagos, where it has been held continually since. The circuit has since been the site of many memorable and championship-deciding races in F1 history, and is frequently cited by drivers and analysts as one of the more challenging circuits on the F1 calendar.

The first race at the new Interlagos in 1990 was won by Alain Prost, who won his 40th career race (the most ever at that point in time) and his sixth Brazilian Grand Prix. It wasn't a popular win, as the events of the previous year's Japanese Grand Prix were still fresh in the minds of many Brazilians: Prost was seen as having been given the Drivers' title by FIA president Jean-Marie Balestre at Senna's expense after Senna was disqualified from that race in Japan. The Brazilian, a home favorite, finished third in Brazil after leading much of the race but then hitting his backmarker ex-teammate Satoru Nakajima in a Tyrrell. 1991 saw the patriotic Senna emotionally win his first Brazilian Grand Prix. His McLaren's manual gearbox was losing gears quickly and close to the end, he only had sixth gear left. This made the car much more difficult and physically demanding to drive, especially as weather conditions worsened (although, under normal conditions, Senna was a wet track specialist), but he still eventually won holding off Williams driver Riccardo Patrese. His exhaustion was so high that had to be extricated from his car, hitching a ride in the safety car (driven by the former driver and former team boss Wilson Fittipaldi Júnior), and almost didn't lift the trophy on the podium. 1992 saw Mansell dominate the weekend and the rest of the season. 1993 was a race of variables; it began to rain heavily early into the race and Prost, now driving a Williams, had a rare accident on the main straight and retired. Senna went on to win in a McLaren from Prost's teammate Damon Hill. 1994 saw Senna, now driving for Williams, spin his recalcitrant car going through Juncao late into the race. He was running in second, trying to catch German Michael Schumacher, who went on to win. Senna would lose his life in an accident at the San Marino Grand Prix a little over a month later. 1995 was a very controversial race that initially had the cars of race winner Michael Schumacher and Britain's David Coulthard excluded for apparently using illegal fuel during the race, but then reinstated. 1996 saw Damon Hill win the second race of his championship-winning season. 1997 saw an accident at the start that involved four cars, and Canadian Jacques Villeneuve went off the course at the first corner; the race was stopped and restarted, and Villeneuve jumped into the spare car and won the race. 1998 saw a controversy surrounding McLaren – Ferrari had protested about their braking system, and it was then banned from the Brazilian Grand Prix, although it had been approved four times by FIA technical delegate Charlie Whiting. It didn't matter much: Finnish McLaren driver Mika Häkkinen won the race anyway. 1999 saw local Rubens Barrichello lead for some time until the engine in his car failed, and Hakkinen won again. In 2000, Barrichello had joined Ferrari and was running second behind his team mate Schumacher (who won at the circuit for the third time) before retiring with a hydraulic failure.

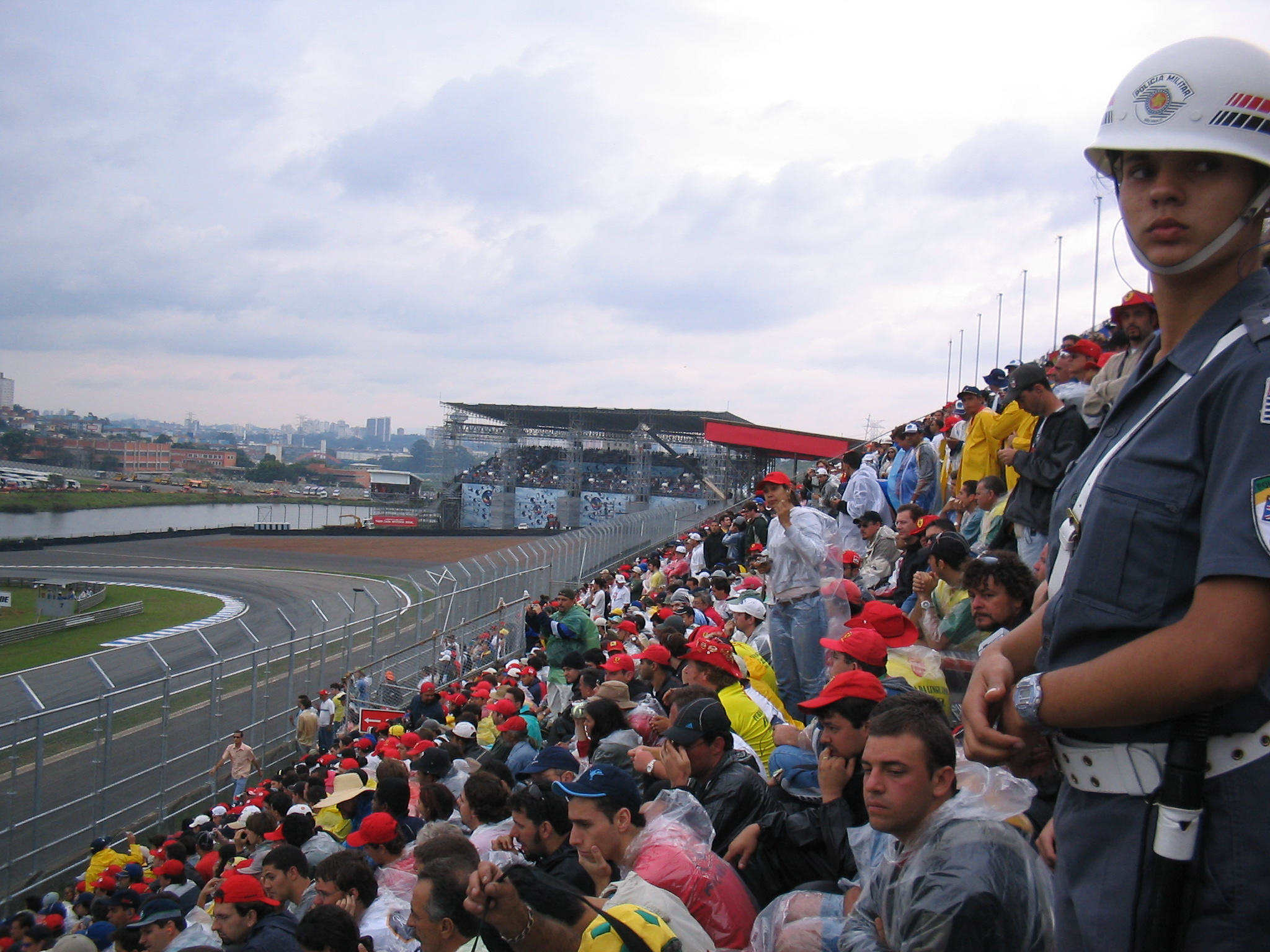
Spectators attending the 2004 Brazilian Grand Prix

The 2001 Grand Prix was notable for marking the explosive arrival of Juan Pablo Montoya onto the Formula One scene. The Colombian driver stunningly muscled his way past Michael Schumacher early on and led easily until an incident in which Arrows's Jos Verstappen ran into the back of his Williams-BMW and ended his race. Montoya did eventually laid to rest the ghost of this event by winning the 2004 race in his final Grand Prix for Williams before moving to McLaren, holding off his future teammate Kimi Räikkönen to take a hard-fought victory. The 2001 race is also notable for two brothers, Michael and Ralf Schumacher, sharing a row on the starting grid for the first time. In 2002 they finished in first and second with Ralf chasing Michael for the victory towards the end of the race.

Particularly memorable recent Brazilian Grands Prix include the 2003 race, which saw a maiden Grand Prix victory, highly unexpectedly, and amidst chaotic and unusual circumstances, for Jordan's Giancarlo Fisichella. Heavy rain before and during the race produced problems with tyre selection which caught out many teams, which allowed the weak Minardi team to have a real chance for victory the only time ever, because they were the only team who prepared for the rainfall, but their drivers were also soon out. And treacherous track conditions caused multiple drivers to spin out of the race, including then-reigning World Champion Michael Schumacher, ending a remarkable run of race finishes dating back to the 2001 German Grand Prix. Amidst this, a number of drivers, including McLaren's Kimi Räikkönen and David Coulthard, led the race, and, when a heavy accident involving Renault's Fernando Alonso blocked the circuit and brought out the red flag, confusion reigned. Fisichella led the race at the time, having just overtaken Räikkönen; however, it was the Finn who was declared the race winner under the rule that stipulated that the race result in such circumstances was to be taken from the running order two laps prior to the race being stopped. This decision was overturned days later in the FIA Court of Appeal in Paris after new evidence came to light which proved that Fisichella had crossed the finish line in the lead for a second time before Alonso's accident, and therefore was the rightful winner. The 2004 event marked the first time since the race's admission to the Formula One Championship calendar that it was not one of the first three rounds of the championship season.

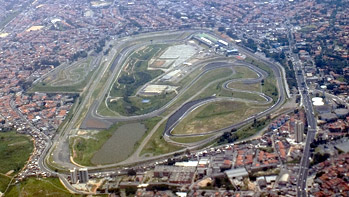
Autódromo José Carlos Pace, the venue for the Brazilian Grand Prix

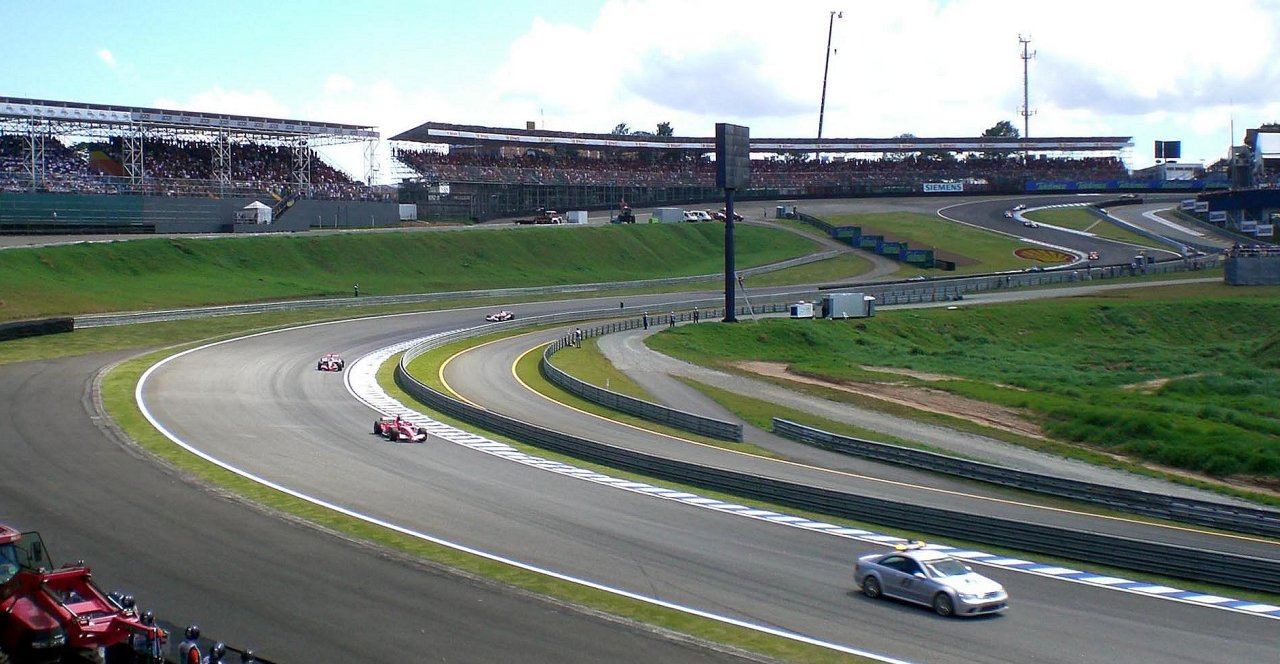
Safety car at the 2006 Brazilian Grand Prix

Fernando Alonso became the youngest ever Formula One World Champion at the 2005 Brazilian Grand Prix, his third place behind winner Juan Pablo Montoya and championship rival Kimi Räikkönen was enough to clinch the title with two races remaining.

For 2006, the Brazilian Grand Prix, as in 2004, was moved to the prestigious position of hosting the final round of the season, in what was Michael Schumacher's first farewell to Formula One, before his return for the 2010 season. Starting from 10th position on the grid, Schumacher did an astonishing job on his last race. He fell to 19th position on the ninth lap due to a flat tyre caused by a minor collision with Giancarlo Fisichella when the former was trying to overtake the latter. After pitting for a new tyre he returned to the race, just in front of leader Massa, so almost being lapped, then passing several drivers to take the chequered flag in fourth place, after a dazzling passing manoeuvre on Kimi Räikkönen. His performance was not enough to give Schumacher his eighth trophy, as Fernando Alonso, who needed only one point to become World Champion again, finished in second place. Brazilian Felipe Massa took pole position and led the race from start to finish to get the second victory of his career and to be greeted by celebrations from his Brazilian supporters.

In the 2007 edition, Kimi Raikkonen won the race and his first and only championship, beating both Fernando Alonso and Lewis Hamilton by a single point.

In March 2008, the mayor of São Paulo announced that he had signed a new deal with Bernie Ecclestone to continue the holding of the Brazilian Grand Prix. This deal allowed the Brazilian race to be on the calendar until 2015. With this, Interlagos was set for major improvements in its pit and paddock facilities.

In the final race of the 2008 season in Brazil, Lewis Hamilton became the youngest Formula One World Champion up to that point in Formula One history. After adopting a conservative strategy without risks for most of the race to secure at least fifth place, and the title, a late-race rain shower caused unexpected trouble. First, Hamilton was pushed down to fifth place by German Toyota driver Timo Glock who didn't enter the pits for intermediates like most other front runners. With just three laps to go, Sebastian Vettel then also overtook the Briton on the track which meant he would end up with equal points to Massa, but with one fewer victory. While everybody was focusing on the battle between these two (Vettel managed to stay in front in the end), against all expectations both were able to overtake Glock, who had lost all grip with his dry-weather tyres, in the very last corner before the finishing straight. This meant that, while the McLaren Drivers' Championship title rival Felipe Massa won the race in his Ferrari, Hamilton ultimately grabbed the fifth place he needed to become champion. Renault's Fernando Alonso, the previous youngest champion, was second ahead of Massa's teammate Kimi Räikkönen and Toro Rosso's Sebastian Vettel.

The 2009 race determined another Drivers' Champion, with Jenson Button in a Brawn finishing fifth to secure his only Drivers' Championship over Vettel, now driving for Red Bull, who finished fourth; Vettel's Australian teammate Mark Webber won the race ahead of Pole Robert Kubica. 2010 saw a wet qualifying and German Nico Hülkenberg drove an astonishing lap to put his non-competitive Williams on pole position. His countryman Vettel won the race ahead of Webber, and this race gave Red Bull the Constructors' Championship, and it set up a four-way duel for the Drivers' title at the final round in Abu Dhabi. 2011 saw another Red Bull 1–2, but it was Webber this time who had won from Vettel, who had already won his second Drivers' title in Japan earlier that year. 2012 was another classic race, where Vettel this time had to do battle with Spanish Ferrari driver Fernando Alonso. After making a very poor start which dropped him to 22nd, he climbed up to sixth which was enough to see him win his third consecutive Drivers' title. This race was also notable for being Michael Schumacher's last ever F1 race: the legendary German had made a comeback with Mercedes in 2010, but he did not win a single race – a huge surprise, considering he was the most successful F1 driver in history. 2013 saw Vettel win his ninth consecutive race that season which was a new record. The record stood until Max Verstappen won his tenth race in a row at the 2023 Italian Grand Prix. 2014 saw the totally dominant Mercedes duo of Nico Rosberg and Lewis Hamilton finish 1–2 in the race. 2015 saw Rosberg win again; he had spent most of that season demoralized and at the mercy of his teammate Hamilton, who won his third Drivers' Championship. 2016 saw continued Mercedes domination, but it was Hamilton who won with Rosberg second. But the Mercedes victory that day was overshadowed by heavy rain, multiple accidents and an astonishing drive from the Dutch teenager Max Verstappen, son of former F1 driver Jos Verstappen, who drove his Red Bull from 16th to third in 15 laps after his team botched its tyre strategy.

On 10 October 2013 it was announced that the contract for the Brazilian Grand Prix had been extended until 2022, with a further extension in November 2020 that extended it to 2025 and one in 2023 that extended it to 2030. In 2026 it was extended to 2035.

The scheduled 2020 race was cancelled by Formula One Management in July that year due to the COVID-19 pandemic, leaving promoters of the Interlagos race furious who said the losses they will make because of this and that, could mean the end of Formula One racing at the venue in the long term.

==== Renaming to São Paulo Grand Prix ====
Formula One would return to Interlagos in the 2021 season, with the event now being titled the São Paulo Grand Prix. Lewis Hamilton, after a disqualification from qualification due to technical infringements, won the main race after achieving a fifth-place finish in the sprint after a back row start. Hamilton's 2022 teammate, George Russell, won both races at São Paulo. In 2023 and 2024, Max Verstappen won both races with Lando Norris winning the latter sprint.

The 2024 São Paulo Grand Prix was held under treacherous, changing conditions which saw numerous incidents, safety cars, and red flags; while Lando Norris started on pole position, Verstappen, who qualified twelfth but endured a five-place grid penalty for a new engine component, forcing him to start seventeenth, won the race nineteen seconds ahead of the second-placed car - the first time a driver won from that position since Kimi Räikkönen won the 2005 Japanese Grand Prix from seventeenth - after a ten-race winless streak, putting him on the path to winning his fourth consecutive Drivers' Championship; he would do so at the subsequent Las Vegas Grand Prix, and his performance was acclaimed by fellow drivers and journalists, who described him as a regenmeister ("rain master"). Alpine achieved a similar success when their drivers, Esteban Ocon and Pierre Gasly, respectively - with the former having been contracted to move to Haas in 2025 - rounded off the podium in second and third, respectively, achieving Team Enstone's first double podium of any kind since Lotus achieved the feat at the 2013 Korean Grand Prix with Räikkönen and Romain Grosjean; this result propelled Alpine from ninth all the way to sixth, upheaving Haas, RB, and Williams.

Five Brazilian drivers have won the Brazilian Grand Prix, with Emerson Fittipaldi, Nelson Piquet, Ayrton Senna and Felipe Massa each winning twice, and Carlos Pace winning once. The most wins ever is by the Frenchman Alain Prost, who has won the race six times (including five times at Jacarepaguá). Argentine driver Carlos Reutemann and Michael Schumacher have both won four times.

=== Rumours of a return to Rio de Janeiro ===
In spring 2019, Jair Bolsonaro, the President of Brazil, announced that the Brazilian Grand Prix would move back to Rio de Janeiro. Because the Jacarepaguá circuit had been demolished to make way for the construction of facilities for the 2016 Summer Olympics, a new circuit was to be built in the Deodoro neighborhood of Rio de Janeiro. However, this was denied by Formula One's commercial manager Sean Bratches.

In November 2020 a deal was signed which would see Formula One continue to race at Interlagos until 2025, albeit under the title of São Paulo Grand Prix. This was the first time that the race had been known as the São Paulo Grand Prix. The race's contract was suspended in January 2021. Also in January 2021, with official confirmation in February 2021, the newly elected Mayor of Rio de Janeiro, Eduardo Paes, confirmed that the plans for the construction of the new circuit at Deodoro were scrapped, with the promise of finding a new suitable place for its construction.

Formula 1 drivers also expressed their concern for the environment about the project and Lewis Hamilton said, ‘I don’t think it’s a smart move. There is a global crisis with deforestation.’

Ultimately, the Brazilian Grand Prix continues to be held in São Paulo, with the current contract for Interlagos set to expire in 2035.

== Winners ==
=== By year ===
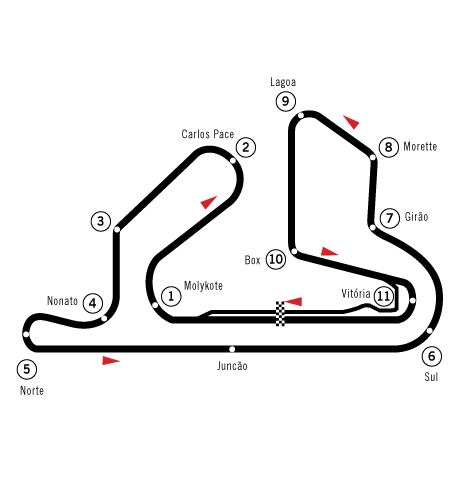
The original Jacarepaguá, used in 1978 and 1981–1989

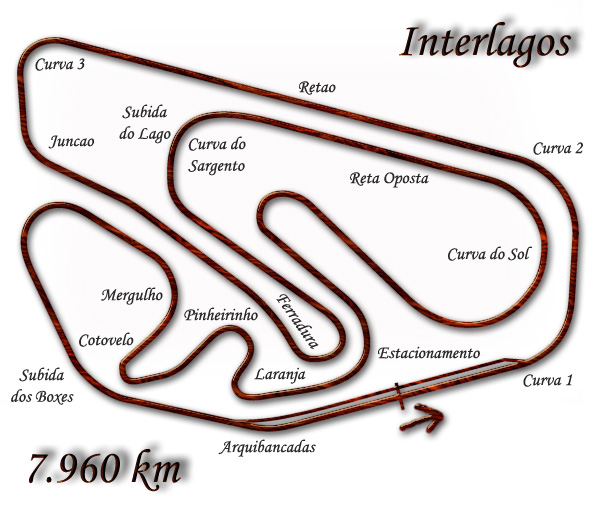
The original Interlagos, used in 1972–1977 and 1979–1980

- A pink background indicates an event which was not part of the Formula One World Championship.
- Since 2021 the event has been held under the name "São Paulo Grand Prix".

Year	Driver	Constructor	Location	Report
1972	(Argentina) Carlos Reutemann	Brabham-Ford	Interlagos	Report
1973	(Brazil) Emerson Fittipaldi	Lotus-Ford	Interlagos	Report
1974	(Brazil) Emerson Fittipaldi	McLaren-Ford	Interlagos	Report
1975	(Brazil) Carlos Pace	Brabham-Ford	Interlagos	Report
1976	(Austria) Niki Lauda	Ferrari	Interlagos	Report
1977	(Argentina) Carlos Reutemann	Ferrari	Interlagos	Report
1978	(Argentina) Carlos Reutemann	Ferrari	Jacarepaguá	Report
1979	(France) Jacques Laffite	Ligier-Ford	Interlagos	Report
1980	(France) René Arnoux	Renault	Interlagos	Report
1981	(Argentina) Carlos Reutemann	Williams-Ford	Jacarepaguá	Report
1982	(France) Alain Prost	Renault	Jacarepaguá	Report
1983	(Brazil) Nelson Piquet	Brabham-BMW	Jacarepaguá	Report
1984	(France) Alain Prost	McLaren-TAG	Jacarepaguá	Report
1985	(France) Alain Prost	McLaren-TAG	Jacarepaguá	Report
1986	(Brazil) Nelson Piquet	Williams-Honda	Jacarepaguá	Report
1987	(France) Alain Prost	McLaren-TAG	Jacarepaguá	Report
1988	(France) Alain Prost	McLaren-Honda	Jacarepaguá	Report
1989	(United Kingdom) Nigel Mansell	Ferrari	Jacarepaguá	Report
1990	(France) Alain Prost	Ferrari	Interlagos	Report
1991	(Brazil) Ayrton Senna	McLaren-Honda	Interlagos	Report
1992	(United Kingdom) Nigel Mansell	Williams-Renault	Interlagos	Report
1993	(Brazil) Ayrton Senna	McLaren-Ford	Interlagos	Report
1994	(Germany) Michael Schumacher	Benetton-Ford	Interlagos	Report
1995	(Germany) Michael Schumacher	Benetton-Renault	Interlagos	Report
1996	(United Kingdom) Damon Hill	Williams-Renault	Interlagos	Report
1997	(Canada) Jacques Villeneuve	Williams-Renault	Interlagos	Report
1998	(Finland) Mika Häkkinen	McLaren-Mercedes	Interlagos	Report
1999	(Finland) Mika Häkkinen	McLaren-Mercedes	Interlagos	Report
2000	(Germany) Michael Schumacher	Ferrari	Interlagos	Report
2001	(United Kingdom) David Coulthard	McLaren-Mercedes	Interlagos	Report
2002	(Germany) Michael Schumacher	Ferrari	Interlagos	Report
2003	(Italy) Giancarlo Fisichella	Jordan-Ford	Interlagos	Report
2004	(Colombia) Juan Pablo Montoya	Williams-BMW	Interlagos	Report
2005	(Colombia) Juan Pablo Montoya	McLaren-Mercedes	Interlagos	Report
2006	(Brazil) Felipe Massa	Ferrari	Interlagos	Report
2007	(Finland) Kimi Räikkönen	Ferrari	Interlagos	Report
2008	(Brazil) Felipe Massa	Ferrari	Interlagos	Report
2009	(Australia) Mark Webber	Red Bull Racing-Renault	Interlagos	Report
2010	(Germany) Sebastian Vettel	Red Bull Racing-Renault	Interlagos	Report
2011	(Australia) Mark Webber	Red Bull Racing-Renault	Interlagos	Report
2012	(United Kingdom) Jenson Button	McLaren-Mercedes	Interlagos	Report
2013	(Germany) Sebastian Vettel	Red Bull Racing-Renault	Interlagos	Report
2014	(Germany) Nico Rosberg	Mercedes	Interlagos	Report
2015	(Germany) Nico Rosberg	Mercedes	Interlagos	Report
2016	(United Kingdom) Lewis Hamilton	Mercedes	Interlagos	Report
2017	(Germany) Sebastian Vettel	Ferrari	Interlagos	Report
2018	(United Kingdom) Lewis Hamilton	Mercedes	Interlagos	Report
2019	(Netherlands) Max Verstappen	Red Bull Racing-Honda	Interlagos	Report
2020	Cancelled due to the COVID-19 pandemic			
2021	(United Kingdom) Lewis Hamilton	Mercedes	Interlagos	Report
2022	(United Kingdom) George Russell	Mercedes	Interlagos	Report
2023	(Netherlands) Max Verstappen	Red Bull Racing-Honda RBPT	Interlagos	Report
2024	(Netherlands) Max Verstappen	Red Bull Racing-Honda RBPT	Interlagos	Report
2025	(United Kingdom) Lando Norris	McLaren-Mercedes	Interlagos	Report
2026	(United Kingdom) Lando Norris	McLaren-Mercedes	Interlagos	Report

=== Repeat winners (drivers) ===
Drivers in bold are competing in the Formula One championship in 2026.
A pink background indicates an event which was not part of the Formula One World Championship.

Wins	Driver	Years won
6	(France) Alain Prost	1982, 1984, 1985, 1987, 1988, 1990
4	(Argentina) Carlos Reutemann	1972, 1977, 1978, 1981
4	(Germany) Michael Schumacher	1994, 1995, 2000, 2002
3	(Germany) Sebastian Vettel	2010, 2013, 2017
3	(United Kingdom) **Lewis Hamilton**	2016, 2018, 2021
3	(Netherlands) **Max Verstappen**	2019, 2023, 2024
2	(Brazil) Emerson Fittipaldi	1973, 1974
2	(Brazil) Nelson Piquet	1983, 1986
2	(United Kingdom) Nigel Mansell	1989, 1992
2	(Brazil) Ayrton Senna	1991, 1993
2	(Finland) Mika Häkkinen	1998, 1999
2	(Colombia) Juan Pablo Montoya	2004, 2005
2	(Brazil) Felipe Massa	2006, 2008
2	(Australia) Mark Webber	2009, 2011
2	(Germany) Nico Rosberg	2014, 2015
2	(United Kingdom) **Lando Norris**	2025, 2026

=== Repeat winners (constructors) ===
Teams in bold are competing in the Formula One championship in the 2026.
A pink background indicates an event which was not part of the Formula One World Championship.

Wins	Constructor	Years won
14	(United Kingdom) **McLaren**	1974, 1984, 1985, 1987, 1988, 1991, 1993, 1998, 1999, 2001, 2005, 2012, 2025, 2026
11	(Italy) **Ferrari**	1976, 1977, 1978, 1989, 1990, 2000, 2002, 2006, 2007, 2008, 2017
7	(Austria) **Red Bull**	2009, 2010, 2011, 2013, 2019, 2023, 2024
6	(United Kingdom) **Williams**	1981, 1986, 1992, 1996, 1997, 2004
6	(Germany) **Mercedes**	2014, 2015, 2016, 2018, 2021, 2022
3	(United Kingdom) Brabham	1972, 1975, 1983
2	(France) Renault	1980, 1982
2	(United Kingdom) Benetton	1994, 1995

=== Repeat winners (engine manufacturers) ===
Manufacturers in bold are competing in the Formula One championship in 2026.
A pink background indicates an event which was not part of the Formula One World Championship.

Wins	Manufacturer	Years won
13	(Germany) **Mercedes** **	1998, 1999, 2001, 2005, 2012, 2014, 2015, 2016, 2018, 2021, 2022, 2025, 2026
11	(Italy) **Ferrari**	1976, 1977, 1978, 1989, 1990, 2000, 2002, 2006, 2007, 2008, 2017
10	**(France)** Renault	1980, 1982, 1992, 1995, 1996, 1997, 2009, 2010, 2011, 2013
9	(United States) Ford *	1972, 1973, 1974, 1975, 1979, 1981, 1993, 1994, 2003
4	(Japan) **Honda**	1986, 1988, 1991, 2019
3	(Luxembourg) TAG ***	1984, 1985, 1987
2	(Germany) BMW	1983, 2004
2	(Japan) Honda RBPT	2023, 2024

* Built by Cosworth, funded by Ford

** Between 1998 and 2005 built by Ilmor, funded by Mercedes

*** Built by Porsche
