= Luiz Bueno =

Brazilian racing driver (1937-2011)

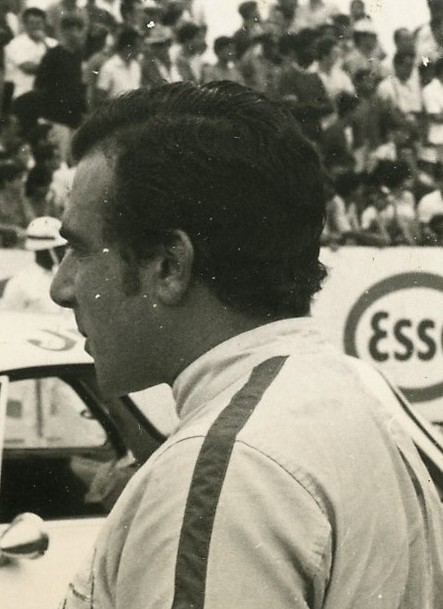
- Bueno in 1967
- Born: 16 January 1937; São Paulo, Brazil
- Died: 8 February 2011 (aged 74); Atibaia, Brazil

Formula One World Championship career
- Nationality: (Brazil) Brazilian
- Active years: 1973
- Team: Surtees
- Entries: 1
- Championships: 0
- Wins: 0
- Podiums: 0
- Career points: 0
- Pole positions: 0
- Fastest laps: 0
- First entry: 1973 Brazilian Grand Prix

Luiz Pereira Bueno, also known as Luiz Bueno, (16 January 1937 – 8 February 2011) was a race car driver from Brazil. He participated in one World Championship Formula One Grand Prix, on 11 February 1973. He scored no championship points. He also participated in several non-championship Formula One races.

Bueno died of cancer, aged 74.

== Complete Formula One World Championship results ==
(key)

Year	Entrant	Chassis	Engine	1	2	3	4	5	6	7	8	9	10	11	12	13	14	15	WDC	Points
1973	Team Surtees	Surtees TS9B	Cosworth V8	ARG	BRA; 12	RSA	ESP	BEL	MON	SWE	FRA	GBR	NED	GER	AUT	ITA	CAN	USA	NC	0

== Complete Formula One Non-Championship results ==
(key)

Year	Entrant	Chassis	Engine	1	2	3	4	5	6
1972	STP March Racing Team	March 711	Cosworth V8	ROC	BRA; 6	INT	OUL	REP	VIC

Preceded by Camilo Christófaro; Eduardo Celidôneo	Winner of the Mil Milhas Brasil; 1967; With: Luiz Terra Smith	Succeeded by Abílio Diniz; Alcides Diniz
