= 1973 Brazilian Grand Prix =

2nd round of the 1973 Formula One World Championship

Race details
- Date: 11 February 1973
- Official name: II Grande Prêmio do Brasil
- Location: Autódromo de Interlagos, São Paulo, Brazil
- Course: Permanent racing facility
- Course length: 7.960 km (4.946 miles)
- Distance: 40 laps, 318.400 km (197.845 miles)
- Weather: Sunny and hot

Pole position
| Driver | (Sweden) Ronnie Peterson | Lotus-Ford |
- Time: 2:30.5

Fastest lap
| Drivers | (Brazil) Emerson Fittipaldi (lap 14) | Lotus-Ford |
| | (New Zealand) Denny Hulme (lap 20) | McLaren-Ford |
- Time: 2:35.0

Podium
| First | (Brazil) Emerson Fittipaldi | Lotus-Ford |
| Second | (United Kingdom) Jackie Stewart | Tyrrell-Ford |
| Third | (New Zealand) Denny Hulme | McLaren-Ford |

The 1973 Brazilian Grand Prix was a Formula One motor race held at Interlagos on 11 February 1973. It was race 2 of 15 in both the 1973 World Championship of Drivers and the 1973 International Cup for Formula One Manufacturers. It was also the first ever world championship race to be held in Brazil. The race was won by home town hero Emerson Fittipaldi after starting from first row beside Ronnie Peterson, who claimed the first pole position in his Formula One career, both driving Lotus. Jackie Stewart finished in second position, driving a Tyrrell. Denny Hulme finished in third position, driving a McLaren.

== Classification ==
=== Qualifying ===
| Pos | No | Driver | Constructor | Time | Gap | Grid |
|---|---|---|---|---|---|---|
| 1 | 2 | (Sweden) Ronnie Peterson | Lotus-Ford | 2:30.5 | | 1 |
| 2 | 1 | (Brazil) Emerson Fittipaldi | Lotus-Ford | 2:30.7 | 0.2 | 2 |
| 3 | 9 | (Belgium) Jacky Ickx | Ferrari | 2:32.0 | 1.5 | 3 |
| 4 | 14 | (Switzerland) Clay Regazzoni | BRM | 2:32.4 | 1.9 | 4 |
| 5 | 7 | (New Zealand) Denny Hulme | McLaren-Ford | 2:32.7 | 2.2 | 5 |
| 6 | 6 | (Brazil) Carlos Pace | Surtees-Ford | 2:32.7 | 2.2 | 6 |
| 7 | 17 | (Argentina) Carlos Reutemann | Brabham-Ford | 2:32.9 | 2.4 | 7 |
| 8 | 3 | (United Kingdom) Jackie Stewart | Tyrrell-Ford | 2:33.3 | 2.8 | 8 |
| 9 | 4 | (France) François Cevert | Tyrrell-Ford | 2:33.4 | 2.9 | 9 |
| 10 | 15 | (France) Jean-Pierre Beltoise | BRM | 2:33.5 | 3.0 | 10 |
| 11 | 18 | (Brazil) Wilson Fittipaldi | Brabham-Ford | 2:34.3 | 3.8 | 11 |
| 12 | 8 | (United States) Peter Revson | McLaren-Ford | 2:34.3 | 3.8 | 12 |
| 13 | 16 | (Austria) Niki Lauda | BRM | 2:35.1 | 4.6 | 13 |
| 14 | 5 | (United Kingdom) Mike Hailwood | Surtees-Ford | 2:35.5 | 5.0 | 14 |
| 15 | 11 | (France) Jean-Pierre Jarier | March-Ford | 2:37.6 | 7.1 | 15 |
| 16 | 19 | (New Zealand) Howden Ganley | Iso-Marlboro-Ford | 2:37.6 | 7.1 | 16 |
| 17 | 10 | (Italy) Arturo Merzario | Ferrari | 2:37.7 | 7.2 | 17 |
| 18 | 20 | (Italy) Nanni Galli | Iso-Marlboro-Ford | 2:38.7 | 8.2 | 18 |
| 19 | 12 | (United Kingdom) Mike Beuttler | March-Ford | 2:39.9 | 9.4 | 19 |
| 20 | 23 | (Brazil) Luiz Bueno | Surtees-Ford | 2:42.5 | 12.0 | 20 |

=== Race ===
| Pos | No | Driver | Constructor | Laps | Time/Retired | Grid | Points |
|---|---|---|---|---|---|---|---|
| 1 | 1 | (Brazil) Emerson Fittipaldi | Lotus-Ford | 40 | 1:43:55.6 | 2 | 9 |
| 2 | 3 | (United Kingdom) Jackie Stewart | Tyrrell-Ford | 40 | + 13.5 | 8 | 6 |
| 3 | 7 | (New Zealand) Denny Hulme | McLaren-Ford | 40 | + 1:46.4 | 5 | 4 |
| 4 | 10 | (Italy) Arturo Merzario | Ferrari | 39 | + 1 Lap | 17 | 3 |
| 5 | 9 | (Belgium) Jacky Ickx | Ferrari | 39 | + 1 Lap | 3 | 2 |
| 6 | 14 | (Switzerland) Clay Regazzoni | BRM | 39 | + 1 Lap | 4 | 1 |
| 7 | 19 | (New Zealand) Howden Ganley | Iso-Marlboro-Ford | 39 | + 1 Lap | 16 | |
| 8 | 16 | (Austria) Niki Lauda | BRM | 38 | + 2 Laps | 13 | |
| 9 | 20 | (Italy) Nanni Galli | Iso-Marlboro-Ford | 38 | + 2 Laps | 18 | |
| 10 | 4 | (France) François Cevert | Tyrrell-Ford | 38 | + 2 Laps | 9 | |
| 11 | 17 | (Argentina) Carlos Reutemann | Brabham-Ford | 38 | + 2 Laps | 7 | |
| 12 | 23 | (Brazil) Luiz Bueno | Surtees-Ford | 36 | + 4 Laps | 20 | |
| Ret | 15 | (France) Jean-Pierre Beltoise | BRM | 23 | Electrical | 10 | |
| Ret | 12 | (United Kingdom) Mike Beuttler | March-Ford | 18 | Overheating | 19 | |
| Ret | 6 | (Brazil) Carlos Pace | Surtees-Ford | 9 | Suspension | 6 | |
| Ret | 5 | (United Kingdom) Mike Hailwood | Surtees-Ford | 6 | Gearbox | 14 | |
| Ret | 11 | (France) Jean-Pierre Jarier | March-Ford | 6 | Gearbox | 15 | |
| Ret | 2 | (Sweden) Ronnie Peterson | Lotus-Ford | 5 | Wheel | 1 | |
| Ret | 18 | (Brazil) Wilson Fittipaldi | Brabham-Ford | 5 | Overheating | 11 | |
| Ret | 8 | (United States) Peter Revson | McLaren-Ford | 3 | Gearbox | 12 | |

== Notes ==
- This was the Formula One World Championship debut for Brazilian driver Luiz Bueno.
- This was the 37th podium finish for Jackie Stewart, breaking the record set by Graham Hill at the 1969 Monaco Grand Prix.
- This race was the inspiration for the song "Lotus 72 D" by Brazilian artist Zé Roberto, also known as Joaquim Roberto Braga

== Championship standings after the race ==
Drivers' Championship standings

| | Pos | Driver | Points |
|---|---|---|---|
| | 1 | (Brazil) Emerson Fittipaldi | 18 |
| 1 | 2 | (United Kingdom) Jackie Stewart | 10 |
| 1 | 3 | (France) François Cevert | 6 |
| 1 | 4 | (New Zealand) Denny Hulme | 6 |
| 1 | 5 | (Belgium) Jacky Ickx | 5 |

Constructors' Championship standings

| | Pos | Constructor | Points |
|---|---|---|---|
| | 1 | (United Kingdom) Lotus-Ford | 18 |
| | 2 | (United Kingdom) Tyrrell-Ford | 12 |
| 1 | 3 | (United Kingdom) McLaren-Ford | 6 |
| 1 | 4 | (Italy) Ferrari | 6 |
| 1 | 5 | (United Kingdom) BRM | 1 |

- Note: Only the top five positions are included for both sets of standings.

| Previous race: 1973 Argentine Grand Prix | FIA Formula One World Championship; 1973 season | Next race: 1973 South African Grand Prix |
| Previous race: 1972 Brazilian Grand Prix (Non-championship race) | Brazilian Grand Prix | Next race: 1974 Brazilian Grand Prix |
