= Athletes at the 2022 FIA Motorsport Games =

The following nations and athletes competed in the 2022 FIA Motorsport Games at Circuit Paul Ricard in Le Castellet, France, from 29 to 31 October 2022.

== Team Albania ==
Automobile Club Albania entered four athletes across three disciplines.

Esports

- Andri Gjoka

Crosscar Senior

- Gentjan Shaqiri

Karting Slalom

- Aleks Begolli
- Nancy Vathi

== Team Andorra ==
The Automobile Club of Andorra entered one athlete in one discipline.

Esports

- Octavio Pisco

== Team Argentina ==
The Argentine Automobile Club entered five athletes across four disciplines.

Touring Car

- Ignacio Montenegro

Drifting

- Rodrigo Gallo

Crosscar Junior

- Juan Manuel Grigera

Rally2 Cup

- Paulo Soria
- Marcelo der Ohannesian

== Team Australia ==
Motorsport Australia entered eight athletes across seven disciplines.

GT Relay

- Brenton Grove
- Stephen Grove

GT Sprint

- Matthew Campbell

Touring Car

- Aaron Cameron

Formula 4

- Costa Toparis

Esports

- Philippa Boquida

Karting Sprint Junior

- Peter Bouzinelos

Karting Sprint Senior

- Aiva Anagnostiadis

== Team Austria ==
The Austrian Automobile Motorcycle and Touring Club entered four athletes across four disciplines.

Formula 4

- Charlie Wurz

Drifting

- Daniel Brandner

Esports

- Felix Temper

Karting Sprint Senior

- Oscar Wurz

== Team Bahamas ==
The Bahamas Motor Sports Association entered seven athletes across three disciplines.

Esports

- Dominick Robinson

Karting Endurance

- Christopher Bain
- Jashai Burrows
- Ramando Hudson
- Giselle Liriano

Karting Slalom

- Caden Burbridge
- Maria Scott

== Team Bangladesh ==
The Automobile Association of Bangladesh entered one athlete in one discipline.

Esports

- Arhaam Rahaman

== Team Barbados ==
The Barbados Motoring Federation entered two athletes across two disciplines.

Esports

- Leon Sealy

Karting Sprint Senior

- Calem Maloney

== Team Belgium ==
The Royal Automobile Club of Belgium entered twenty-two athletes across fourteen disciplines.

GT Sprint

- Dries Vanthoor

Touring Car

- Gilles Magnus

Formula 4

- Lorens Lecertua

Drifting

- Pieter van Hoorick

Esports

- Mathias Kühn

Crosscar Junior

- Romuald Demelenne

Crosscar Senior

- Kobe Pauwels

Rally2 Cup

- Cédric de Cecco
- Jérôme Humblet

Rally4 Cup

- Tom Rensonnet
- Loïc Dumont

Karting Sprint Junior

- Thibaut Ramaekers

Karting Sprint Senior

- Elie Goldstein

Karting Endurance

- Maxime Drion
- Antoine Morlet
- Jeremy Peclers
- Sita Vanmeert

Karting Slalom

- Romy Degroote
- Dario Pemov

Auto Slalom

- Dylan Czaplicki
- Lyssia Baudet

== Team Belize ==
The Belize Automobile Club entered two athletes in one discipline.

Karting Slalom

- Emery Paul Nicholas
- Rosabell Dueck

== Team Brazil ==
The Brazilian Auto Racing Confederation entered eleven athletes across nine disciplines.

GT Relay

- Adalberto Baptista
- Bruno Baptista

GT Sprint

- Bruno Baptista

Touring Car

- Raphael Reis

Formula 4

- Pedro Clerot

Esports

- Igor Rodrigues

Rally2 Cup

- Adroaldo Weisheimer
- (Italy) Rafael Capoani

Karting Sprint Junior

- Gabriel Koenigkan

Karting Sprint Senior

- João Maranhão

Auto Slalom

- Bruno Pierozan
- Kaká Magno

== Team Canada ==
The Groupe de Développement Sportif entered three athletes across two disciplines.

Touring Car

- Travis Hill

Karting Slalom

- Keaton Dietrich
- Paige Dietrich

== Team Chile ==
The Chilean Federation of Motor Sport entered three athletes across three disciplines.

Formula 4

- Maria José Pérez de Arce

Esports

- Nicolás Rubilar

Karting Sprint Senior

- Gustavo Suárez

== Team Chinese Taipei ==
The Chinese Taipei Motor Sports Association entered twelve athletes across seven disciplines.

GT Relay

- Chen Yi-Fan
- Chen Wen-Ko

GT Sprint

- Chen Yi-Fan

Formula 4

- Ethan Ho

Esports

- Lin Kuei-Min

Karting Sprint Senior

- Chun-Ting Chou

Karting Endurance

- Tsai Yu-Hsuan
- Lo Chun-Yao
- Cheng Hsiao-Hsu
- Chung Chen-Yu

Auto Slalom

- Lin Chun-Ta
- Shen Yu-Ru

== Team Costa Rica ==
The Automobile Club of Costa Rica entered two athletes across two disciplines.

Karting Sprint Junior

- Diego Ardiles

Karting Sprint Senior

- Gabriel Kawer

== Team Croatia ==
The Croatian Automobile & Karting Federation entered three athletes across two disciplines.

Esports

- Mihael Matika

Auto Slalom

- Nenad Damarija
- Iva Damarija

== Team Czechia ==
The Autoclub of Czechia entered twelve athletes across seven disciplines.

Drifting

- Marco Zakouřil

Esports

- Martin Kadlečík

Crosscar Senior

- Adam Kotaška

Rally Historic Cup

- Vojtěch Štajf
- František Rajnoha

Karting Sprint Junior

- Jakub Kameník

Karting Endurance

- Ondřej Kočka
- Aleš Burger
- Zdeněk Ošťádal
- Soňa Ptáčková

Auto Slalom

- Dominik Šurýn
- Dagmar Kamas Bělíková

== Team Denmark ==
The Danish Automobile Sports Union entered six athletes across six disciplines.

Formula 4

- Julius Dinesen

Drifting

- Mikkel Overgaard

Esports

- Mikkel Gade

Rally4 Cup

- Casper Nielsen
- (Belgium) Ward Hanssens

Karting Sprint Junior

- Mikkel Gaarde Pedersen

Karting Sprint Senior

- Valdemar Aggerholm

== Team Estonia ==
The Estonian Autosport Union entered thirteen athletes across ten disciplines.

Drifting

- Kevin Pesur

Esports

- Juss Parek

Crosscar Junior

- Armin Raag

Crosscar Senior

- Martin Juga

Rally2 Cup

- Georg Linnamäe
- (United Kingdom) James Morgan

Rally Historic Cup

- Marko Mättik
- Arvo Maslenikov

Karting Sprint Junior

- Mark Dubnitski

Karting Sprint Senior

- Carmen Kraav

Karting Slalom

- Martaliisa Meindorf
- Jürgen Laansoo

Auto Slalom

- Hanna Lisette Aabna
- Kevin Lempu

== Team Finland ==
AKK Motorsport entered two athletes across two disciplines.

Drifting

- Juha Pöytälaakso

Karting Sprint Junior

- Kimi Tani

== Team France ==
The Fédération Française du Sport Automobile entered fourteen athletes across eleven disciplines.

GT Relay

- Eric Debard
- Simon Gachet

GT Sprint

- Tristan Vautier

Touring Car

- Teddy Clairet

Formula 4

- Pablo Sarrazin

Drifting

- Jason Banet

Esports

- Alexandre Lê

Crosscar Junior

- Etan Pepujol

Crosscar Senior

- David Meat

Rally2 Cup

- Mathieu Arzeno
- Romain Roche

Rally Historic Cup

- Philippe Gache
- Philippe David

Karting Sprint Junior

- Jules Caranta

== Team Georgia ==
The Georgian Automobile Sport Federation entered twelve athletes across seven disciplines.

Formula 4

- Sandro Tavartkiladze

Drifting

- Nodo Kodua

Esports

- Sandro Chanturia

Karting Sprint Junior

- Lado Kukhianidze

Karting Endurance

- Nika Kobosnidze
- Mariam Tsiklauri
- Archil Tsimakuridze
- Mariam Davitidze

Karting Slalom

- Sandro Kajaia
- Nutsa Makhatchadze

Auto Slalom

- Mevlud Meladze
- Irina Onashvili

== Team Germany ==
The Deutscher Motor Sport Bund entered eighteen athletes across thirteen disciplines.

GT Relay

- Fabian Schiller
- Valentin Pierburg

GT Sprint

- Luca Stolz

Formula 4

- Valentin Kluss

Drifting

- Gerson Junginger

Esports

- Constantin Tscharf

Crosscar Junior

- Samuel Drews

Crosscar Senior

- Tim Braumüller

Rally2 Cup

- Björn Satorius
- Hanna Ostlender

Rally Historic Cup

- Renate Mayr
- Siegfried Mayr

Karting Sprint Junior

- Mathilda Paatz

Karting Sprint Senior

- Maximilian Schleimer

Karting Slalom

- Sebastian Romberg
- Annika Spielberger

Auto Slalom

- Claire Schönborn
- Marcel Hellberg

== Team Greece ==
The Hellenic Motorsport Federation entered five athletes across four disciplines.

Drifting

- George Lagos

Esports

- Harris Mitropoulos

Rally2 Cup

- Nikos Pavlidis
- Dimitris Amaxopoulos

Rally4 Cup

- Paschalis Hatzimarkos
- (Portugal) Marios Tsaussoglou

== Team Guatemala ==
The Automobile Club of Guatemala entered one athlete in one discipline.

Esports

- Juanes Morales

== Team Hong Kong ==
The Hong Kong Automobile Association entered thirteen athletes across nine disciplines.

GT Relay

- Ip Kung-Ching
- Marchy Lee

GT Sprint

- Marchy Lee

Touring Car

- Andy Yan

Formula 4

- Thong Wei-Heen

Drifting

- Ng Ka-Ki

Esports

- Wong Kai-Hin

Karting Sprint Senior

- Yu Ka-Po

Karting Endurance

- Chung Pui-Yan
- Ho Man-Cheong
- Wong King-Chi
- Yeung Tak

Karting Slalom

- Mok Sum-Nga
- Ng Jaden

== Team Hungary ==
The National Automobile Sport Federation of Hungary entered eleven athletes across eight disciplines.

Formula 4

- Zénó Kovács

Drifting

- Péter Utasi

Esports

- Kristóf Artzt

Crosscar Junior

- Kristóf Csuti

Rally2 Cup

- Martin László
- Dávid Berendi

Karting Sprint Senior

- Balázs Juráncsik

Karting Slalom

- Ádám Szabó
- Lilla Horn

Auto Slalom

- Martin Bognár
- Tünde Deák

== Team Iceland ==
The Icelandic Motorsport Association entered one athlete in one discipline.

Esports

- Hákon Jökulsson

== Team India ==
The Federation of Motor Sports Clubs of India entered six athletes across five disciplines.

Formula 4

- Ruhaan Alva

Rally4 Cup

- Sanjay Takale
- (New Zealand) Mike Young

Karting Sprint Junior

- Ishaan Madesh

Karting Sprint Senior

- Kyle Kumaran

Auto Slalom

- Prateek Dalal
- Pragathi Gowda

== Team Indonesia ==
The Indonesian Motor Association entered three athletes across three disciplines.

Esports

- Presley Martono

Karting Sprint Junior

- Aditya Wibowo

Karting Sprint Senior

- Kaenan Reza Sini

== Team Ireland ==
Motorsport Ireland entered one athlete in one discipline.

Touring Car

- Jack Young

== Team Israel ==
The Automobile and Touring Club of Israel entered twelve athletes across seven disciplines.

Esports

- Denis Gribov

Crosscar Senior

- Adar Melamed

Karting Sprint Junior

- Yam Pinto

Karting Sprint Senior

- Ariel Elkin

Karting Endurance

- Itzik Shahar
- Yaniv Hershkowitz
- Ran Ben Ezer
- Yordan Oved

Karting Slalom

- Chen Ido
- Eva Garlink

Auto Slalom

- Tal Sharig
- Yuval Ravitz

== Team Italy ==
The Automobile Club d'Italia entered eleven athletes across nine disciplines.

GT Sprint

- Mirko Bortolotti

Touring Car

- Giacomo Ghermandi

Formula 4

- Andrea Kimi Antonelli

Drifting

- Manuel Vacca

Esports

- Luca Losio

Crosscar Senior

- Simone Firenze

Rally4 Cup

- Roberto Daprà
- Luca Guglielmetti

Rally Historic Cup

- Andrea Zivian
- Nicola Arena

== Team Japan ==
The Japan Automobile Federation entered one athlete in one discipline.

Esports

- Sota Muto

== Team Kosovo ==
The Federation of Auto Sport of Kosovo entered five athletes across three disciplines.

Esports

- Visar Gjikolli

Karting Slalom

- Baran Karabeg
- Rea Gashi

Auto Slalom

- Ermira Topalli
- Valon Jaha

== Team Kuwait ==
The Kuwait International Automobile Club entered three athletes across three disciplines.

Drifting

- Ali Makhseed

Esports

- Rashed Al-Rashdan

Karting Sprint Senior

- Fahad Al-Khaled

== Team Latvia ==
The Latvian Federation of Motor Vehicles entered six athletes across five disciplines.

Touring Car

- Valters Zviedris

Drifting

- Kristaps Blušs

Esports

- Andrejs Gubarevs

Crosscar Senior

- Reinis Nitišs

Auto Slalom

- Toms Ozols
- Maija Stakena

== Team Lithuania ==
The Lithuanian Automobile Sport Federation entered nine athletes across seven disciplines.

GT Relay

- Jonas Gelžinis
- Eimantas Navikauskas

GT Sprint

- Julius Adomavičius

Drifting

- Benediktas Čirba

Esports

- Tauras Gudinavičius

Karting Sprint Junior

- Markas Šilkūnas

Karting Sprint Senior

- Adrijus Rimkevičius

Auto Slalom

- Evelina Drilingienė
- Vytis Pauliukonis

== Team Luxembourg ==
The Automobile Club of Luxembourg entered two athletes across two disciplines.

Drifting

- Rohan van Riel

Esports

- Daniel Lahyr

== Team Malaysia ==
The Motorsports Association of Malaysia entered two athletes across two disciplines.

Formula 4

- Alister Yoong

Esports

- Naquib Azlan

== Team Malta ==
The Malta Motorsport Federation entered nine athletes across five disciplines.

Esports

- Dean Vella

Karting Sprint Junior

- Kian Gauci

Karting Sprint Senior

- Lucas Pace

Karting Endurance

- Ella Zammit
- Nicky Gauci
- Owen Mangion
- Kyle Mercieca

Karting Slalom

- Raisa Psaila
- Kieran Galea

== Team Mexico ==
The Mexican International Motor Sport Federation entered three athletes across three disciplines.

Esports

- Michael Teichmann

Rally4 Cup

- Gustavo Urióstegui
- (Spain) Axel Coronado

Karting Sprint Junior

- Edgar Rodríguez

== Team Morocco ==
The Royal Moroccan Federation of Motor Sport entered one athlete in one discipline.

GT Sprint

- Michaël Benyahia

== Team Mozambique ==
The Automobile and Touring Club of Mozambique entered five athletes across five disciplines.

Formula 4

- Guilherme Rocha

Drifting

- Zanil Satar

Esports

- Dylan Jesus

Karting Sprint Junior

- Ghazi Motlekar

Karting Sprint Senior

- Cristian Bouché

== Team Nepal ==
The Nepal Automobiles' Association entered three athletes across two disciplines.

Karting Sprint Senior

- Diprash Shakya

Auto Slalom

- Anil Kumar Baral
- Jiswan Tuladhar Shrestha

== Team Netherlands ==
The KNAC National Autosport Federation entered nine athletes across seven disciplines.

Touring Car

- Tom Coronel

Drifting

- Rick van Goethem

Esports

- Chris Harteveld

Crosscar Junior

- Nathan Ottink

Crosscar Senior

- Jari van Hoof

Rally4 Cup

- Martijn van Hoek
- Nard Ippen

Karting Slalom

- Naomi de Groot
- Lukas Stiefelhagen

== Team Nigeria ==
The Automobile Sports Club of Nigeria entered five athletes across four disciplines.

Esports

- Segun Akin-Olugbade

Karting Sprint Junior

- Baruch Roy-Bako

Karting Sprint Senior

- Philip Gana

Karting Slalom

- John Nenger
- Damilola Ademokoya

== Team Norway ==
The Royal Norwegian Automobile Club entered five athletes across five disciplines.

Touring Car

- Didrik Esbjug

Drifting

- Odd-Helge Helstad

Esports

- Tommy Østgaard

Crosscar Junior

- Eirik Steinsholt

Crosscar Senior

- Ole-Henry Steinsholt

== Team Panama ==
The Automotive Association of Touring and Sports of Panama entered two athletes across two disciplines.

Formula 4

- Valentino Miní

Karting Sprint Senior

- Valentín Flammini

== Team Peru ==
The Touring and Automobile Club of Peru entered ten athletes across five disciplines.

Esports

- Ian Kishimoto

Karting Sprint Junior

- Andrés Cárdenas

Karting Endurance

- Taylor Greenfield
- Harold Watson
- Mark Harten
- Maje Esquivel

Karting Slalom

- Claudio Bisso
- Carolina Harten

Auto Slalom

- Andrea Takashima
- Roberto Takashima

== Team Poland ==
The Polish Automobile and Motorcycle Association entered fifteen athletes across nine disciplines.

GT Relay

- Karol Basz
- Marcin Jedlinski

Drifting

- Jakub Przygoński

Esports

- Marcin Świderek

Crosscar Senior

- Maciej Laskowski

Karting Sprint Junior

- Borys Łyżeń

Karting Sprint Senior

- Adrian Łabuda

Karting Endurance

- Marcel Kuc
- Kornelia Olkucka
- Jakub Rajski
- Adam Szydłowski

Karting Slalom

- Karol Król
- Emilia Rotko

Auto Slalom

- Daniel Dymurski
- Sara Kałuzińska

== Team Portugal ==
The Portuguese Federation of Auto Racing and Karting entered thirteen athletes across eight disciplines.

Formula 4

- Manuel Espírito Santo

Drifting

- João Vieira

Esports

- João Cavaca

Crosscar Junior

- Guilherme Matos

Rally4 Cup

- Ricardo Sousa
- Luís Marques

Karting Sprint Junior

- Rodrigo Seabra (22.12.2010)

Karting Sprint Senior

- Francisca Queiroz

Karting Endurance

- Sofia Correia
- Mariana Machado
- Rita Teixeira
- Anastacia Khomyn

== Team Puerto Rico ==
The Racing Federation of Puerto Rico entered two athletes in one discipline.

GT Relay

- Víctor Gómez
- Francesco Piovanetti

== Team Romania ==
The Automobile Club of Romania entered three athletes across two disciplines.

Drifting

- Calin Ciortan

Rally4 Cup

- Cristiana Oprea
- Alexia-Denisa Parteni

== Team Serbia ==
The Auto-Moto Association of Serbia entered one athlete in one discipline.

Formula 4

- Filip Jenić

== Team Singapore ==
Motor Sports Singapore entered one athlete in one discipline.

Esports

- Muhammad Aleef

== Team Slovakia ==
The Slovak Association of Motor Sport entered fourteen athletes across eight disciplines.

Esports

- Bence Bánki

Crosscar Senior

- Tomi Baráti

Rally Historic Cup

- Jaroslav Petrán
- Iveta Halčinová

Karting Sprint Junior

- Matej Koník

Karting Sprint Senior

- Matúš Borec

Karting Endurance

- Veronika Dobrotová
- Juraj Mlčuch
- Imi Szakal
- Matej Koczo

Karting Slalom

- Margareta Mahutová
- Lukáš Borec

Auto Slalom

- Michaela Dorčíková
- Dávid Nemček

== Team Slovenia ==
The Auto Sport Federation of Slovenia entered four athletes across three disciplines.

Esports

- Jug Klemen

Karting Sprint Junior

- Aleksandar Bogunović

Auto Slalom

- Nejc Trček
- Rebeka Kobal

== Team South Africa ==
Motorsport South Africa entered four athletes across three disciplines.

Esports

- Koketso Pilane

Karting Sprint Junior

- Dhivyen Naidoo

Auto Slalom

- Paige de Jager
- Warren Barkhuizen

== Team South Korea ==
The Korea Automobile Racing Association entered two athletes across two disciplines.

Formula 4

- Michael Shin

Esports

- Park Yun-ho

== Team Sri Lanka ==
The Ceylon Motor Sports Club entered two athletes across two disciplines.

Esports

- Savi Rathnayake

Karting Sprint Senior

- Yevan David

== Team Spain ==
The Royal Spanish Automobile Federation entered twenty-six athletes across sixteen disciplines.

GT Relay

- Gonzalo de Andrés
- Fernando Navarrete

GT Sprint

- Daniel Juncadella

Touring Car

- Isidro Callejas

Formula 4

- Bruno del Pino

Drifting

- Álex Pérez

Esports

- Alberto García

Crosscar Junior

- Diego Martínez

Crosscar Senior

- Iván Piña

Rally2 Cup

- Pepe López
- Borja Rozada

Rally4 Cup

- Óscar Palomo
- Rodrigo Sanjuán

Rally Historic Cup

- Antonio Sainz
- Miguel de la Puente

Karting Sprint Junior

- Aarón García

Karting Sprint Senior

- Nacho Tuñón

Karting Endurance

- Álvaro Bajo
- Alba Cano
- José Manuel Pérez-Aicart
- Iván Velasco

Karting Slalom

- Álvaro Gutiérrez
- Lucía Gimeno

Auto Slalom

- Miguel García Pérez-Carrillo
- Laura Aparicio

== Team Sweden ==
The Svenska Bilsportförbundet entered nine athletes across eight disciplines.

Touring Car

- Andreas Bäckman

Drifting

- Mikael Johansson

Esports

- Mikael Sundström

Crosscar Junior

- Alex Gustafsson

Crosscar Senior

- Patrik Hallberg

Rally2 Cup

- Jari Liiten
- John Stigh

Karting Sprint Junior

- Scott Kin Lindblom

Karting Sprint Senior

- Joel Bergström

== Team Switzerland ==
Auto Sport Suisse entered seven athletes across seven disciplines.

GT Relay

- Yannick Mettler
- Dexter Müller

GT Sprint

- Yannick Mettler

Touring Car

- Gabriel Lusquiños

Formula 4

- Dario Cabanelas

Drifting

- Nicolas Maunoir

Esports

- Thomas Schmid

Karting Sprint Junior

- Elia Epifanio

== Team Turkey ==
The Turkish Automobile Sports Federation entered ten athletes across eight disciplines.

GT Sprint

- Ayhancan Güven

Drifting

- Timur Pomak

Esports

- Ulaş Özyıldırım

Crosscar Junior

- Can Alakoç

Crosscar Senior

- Kerem Kazaz

Rally2 Cup

- Orhan Avcıoğlu
- Burçin Korkmaz

Rally4 Cup

- Ali Türkkan
- Burak Erdener

Karting Sprint Junior

- Alp Aksoy

== Team United Arab Emirates ==
The Automobile & Touring Club of the United Arab Emirates entered five athletes across two disciplines.

Esports

- Sultan Abdulrahman

Karting Endurance

- Marian Al-Hosani
- Ahmad Al-Boom
- Ahmad Al-Hamadi
- Humaid Al-Ketbi

== Team United Kingdom ==
Motorsport UK entered eighteen athletes across ten disciplines.

GT Relay

- Christopher Froggatt
- Ian Loggie

Touring Car

- Chris Smiley

Drifting

- Martin Richards

Esports

- James Baldwin

Crosscar Junior

- Corey Padgett

Crosscar Senior

- Daniel Rooke

Rally2 Cup

- Oliver Mellors
- Ian Windress

Rally Historic Cup

- Timothy Jones
- Steven Jones

Karting Endurance

- Owen Jenman
- Jack O’Neill
- Mike Philippou
- Rhianna Purcocks

Auto Slalom

- Laura Christmas
- Mark King

== Team United States ==
The Automobile Competition Committee for the United States entered one athlete in one discipline.

Esports

- Tyler Limsnukan

== Team Ukraine ==
The Automobile Federation of Ukraine entered thirteen athletes across ten disciplines.

GT Relay

- Ivan Peklin
- Evgeny Sokolovsky

Touring Car

- Pavlo Chabanov

Formula 4

- Oleksandr Partyshev

Drifting

- Dmitriy Ilyuk

Esports

- Devid Pastukhov

Crosscar Junior

- Nikita Botuk

Karting Sprint Junior

- Mark Brovko

Karting Sprint Senior

- Dmitriy Muravshchyk

Karting Slalom

- Mariya Kravchenko
- Ivan Kondratenko

Auto Slalom

- Tatyana Kaduchenko
- Andriy Yaromenko

== Team Uzbekistan ==
The National Automobile Club of Uzbekistan entered eleven athletes across six disciplines.

Formula 4

- Ismoilkhuja Akhmedkhodjaev

Esports

- Eldor Radjapov

Karting Sprint Junior

- Amir Khamraev

Karting Endurance

- Anastasiya Urunova
- Adhamjon Egarmberdiev
- Islomjon Ismoilov
- Farukh Urunov

Karting Slalom

- Yasmina Egamberdieva
- Domenik Suleymanov

Auto Slalom

- Sabina Atadjanova
- Olim Akhmadjanov

== Team Venezuela ==
The Touring and Automobile Club of Venezuela entered two athletes across two disciplines.

Touring Car

- Sergio López

Karting Sprint Senior

- Andrés Ardiles

== Team Vietnam ==
The Vietnamese Motorsports Association entered two athletes in one discipline.

Auto Slalom

- Bảo Bảo
- Kristian Béla
