= Kimi Antonelli =

Italian racing driver (born 2006)

- Antonelli at the 2026 Dutch Grand Prix
- Born: Andrea Kimi Antonelli; 25 August 2006 (age 20); Bologna, Emilia-Romagna, Italy
- Father: Marco Antonelli
- Awards: Full list

Formula One World Championship career
- Nationality: (Italy) Italian
- 2026 team: Mercedes
- Car number: 12
- Entries: 44 (44 starts)
- Championships: 1 (2026)
- Wins: 9
- Podiums: 19
- Career points: 540
- Pole positions: 7
- Fastest laps: 11
- First entry: 2025 Australian Grand Prix
- First win: 2026 Chinese Grand Prix
- Last win: 2026 United States Grand Prix
- Last entry: 2026 São Paulo Grand Prix
- 2025 position: 7th (150 pts)

Previous series
- 2024; 2023; 2023; 2022; 2022; 2021–2022: FIA Formula 2; FR European; FR Middle East; ADAC F4; F4 UAE; Italian F4

Championship titles
- 2023; 2023; 2022; 2022: FR European; FR Middle East; ADAC F4; Italian F4
Medal record
Formula racing
Representing Italy
FIA Motorsport Games
Gold medal – first place	2022 Le Castellet	F4 Cup

Signature
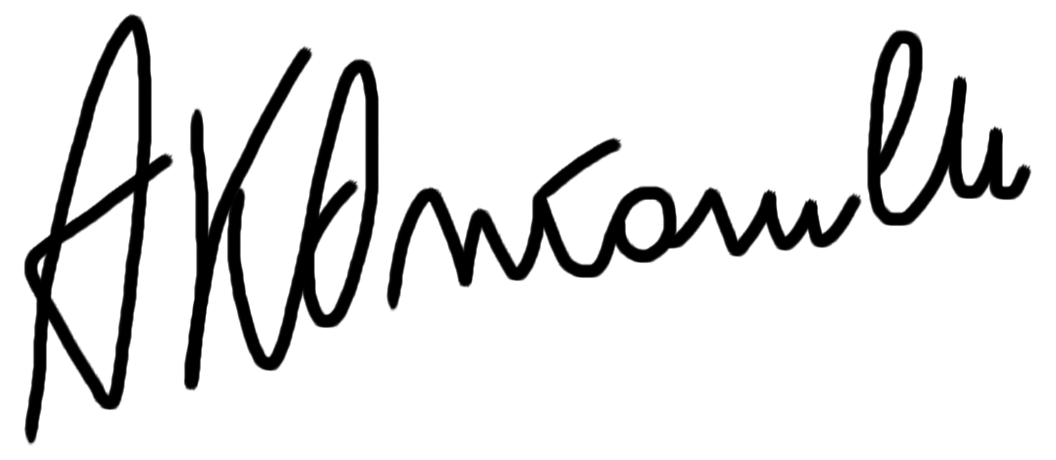

Andrea Kimi Antonelli (Italian: [anˈdrɛːa ˈkiːmi antoˈnɛlli]; born 25 August 2006) is an Italian racing driver who competes in Formula One for Mercedes. Antonelli won the Formula One World Drivers' Championship in 2026 with Mercedes, becoming the youngest-ever World Drivers' Champion; he has won nine Grands Prix since his debut in 2025.

Born and raised in Bologna, Antonelli is the son of sportscar racing driver Marco Antonelli. After a successful karting career—culminating in back-to-back victories at the senior European Championship in 2020 and 2021—Antonelli graduated to junior formulae. He dominated the Italian and ADAC F4 titles in 2022 with Prema, won a race in Italian GT3, and took a gold medal for Italy at the FIA Motorsport Games. He then claimed both the European and Middle East Championships in Formula Regional, before finishing sixth in his rookie season of FIA Formula 2.

A member of the Mercedes Junior Team since 2019, (Note: Antonelli was formally announced as a member of the Mercedes Junior Team in April 2019, having signed in early 2018.) Antonelli replaced Lewis Hamilton to partner George Russell at Mercedes in 2025 and became the third-youngest driver in Formula One history, aged 18; he achieved his maiden podium in Canada. Mercedes emerged as the lead constructor in 2026, with Antonelli winning nine Grands Prix—including his home Grand Prix in Italy—and setting several records as he became the youngest World Drivers' Champion in history, aged 20, as well as the first Italian champion in 73 years.

As of the 2026 São Paulo Grand Prix, Antonelli has achieved 9 wins, 7 pole positions, 11 fastest laps, and 19 podiums from 44 starts in Formula One. In addition to the accolades above, he holds several Formula One records, including being the youngest polesitter, the youngest driver to set a fastest lap and to score a grand chelem. Antonelli is contracted to remain at Mercedes until at least the end of the 2027 season.

== Early life ==
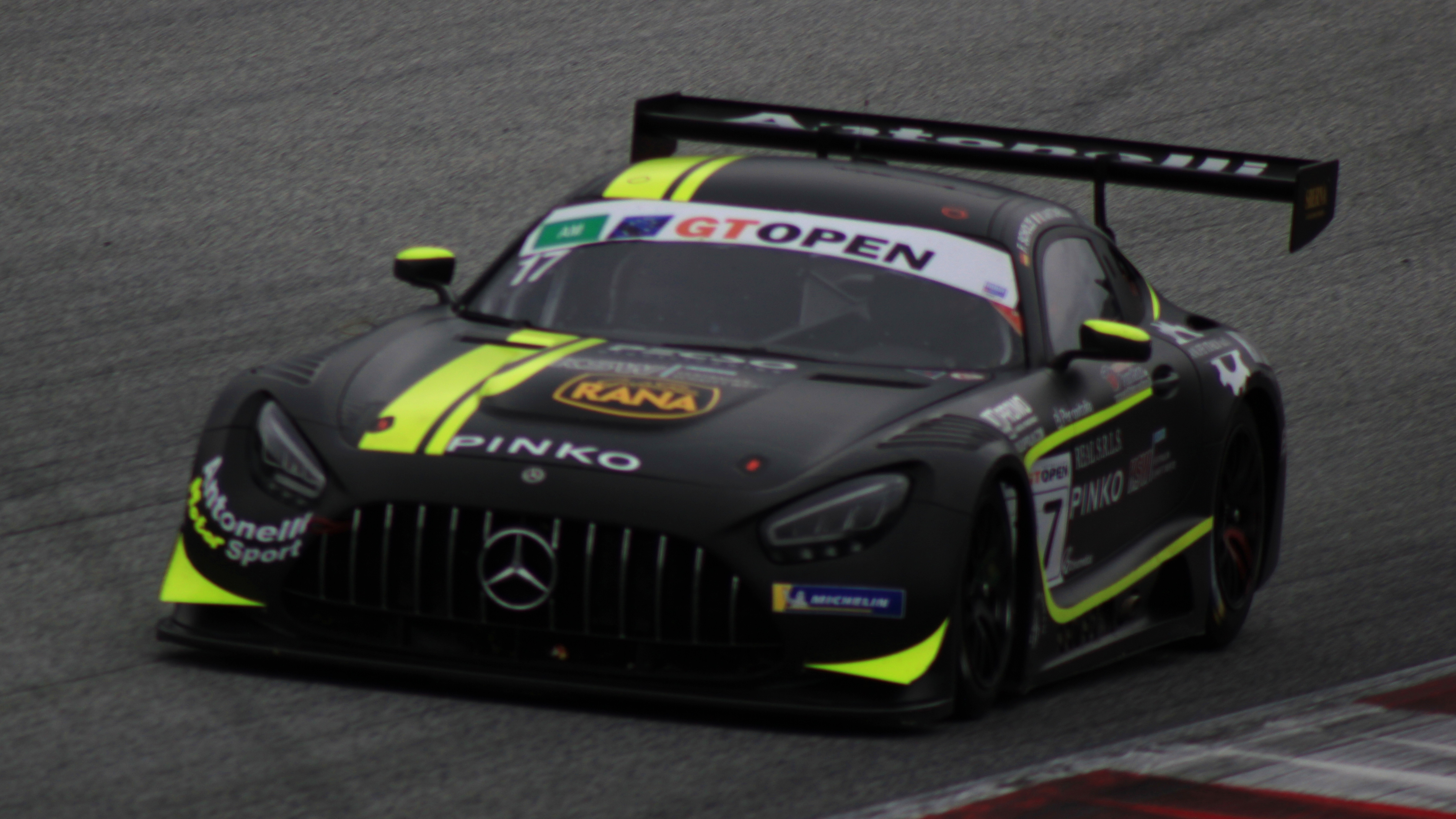
Antonelli is the son of sportscar racing driver and team owner Marco Antonelli.

Andrea Kimi Antonelli was born on 25 August 2006 in Bologna, Emilia-Romagna, Italy, and grew up in nearby Casalecchio di Reno. His father, Marco Antonelli, is a sportscar racing driver and owner of the San Marino–based AKM Motorsport racing team, which has competed in the Italian F4 Championship since 2022. He founded Antonelli Motorsport in 1993, which competed in several GT series, winning the 2018 Italian GT Championship. His mother, Veronica Pomaro, is a former employee of Poste Italiane and has worked in motorsport since 1997, helping Marco operate AKM. He has a younger sister named Maggie.

Antonelli shares his middle name with the forename of Kimi Räikkönen—the 2007 Formula One World Drivers' Champion; Antonelli has stated that the name was given by Enrico Bertaggia to his father, who wanted his son to have a foreign name after "Andrea", and that he was not named after Räikkönen. He studied international relations and marketing at ITCS Gaetano Salvemini in Casalecchio di Reno and learned to speak English during his race weekends, as well as German upon joining the Mercedes Junior Team. His father initially wanted him to play football in Italy before entering him into karting, as he showed more passion for motorsport. He grew up idolising three-time World Drivers' Champion Ayrton Senna and would watch DVD footage of his triumphs with his father; he also idolised Argentine footballer Lionel Messi. He first drove a Lamborghini Super Trofeo at the age of nine, with his father operating the pedals.

== Junior racing career ==
=== Karting (2014–2021) ===
==== 2014–2017: Career beginnings and international debut ====
Antonelli was introduced to kart racing through his father and, aged five, began driving at Galliano Park in Forlì. He started competing two years later and won championships in several categories of the discipline. After attending a summer camp with the Automobile Club d'Italia in 2014, Antonelli was scouted by Giovanni Minardi—the son of Giancarlo—who signed him to Minardi Management. He moved to Birel ART's Easykart spec series in 2015, where he won the Trofeo Italia in the 60 cc class, as well as the International Grand Final from twenty-first on the grid; he also reached the final of the WSK Final Cup in 60 Mini. Antonelli entered several major competitions with Tony Kart in 2016, achieving podium finishes in the Italian Cup and Trofeo delle Industrie, as well as the WSK Super Master Series in 2017. He won the third round of the Italian Championship that year at Battipaglia.

==== 2018–2019: International success as a Mercedes Junior ====
Signing to the Mercedes Junior Team in 2018, Antonelli joined Energy Corse and won the WSK Champions Cup, South Garda Winter Cup, and ROK Cup International Final in the mini classes that year, as well as finishing runner-up to Martinius Stenshorne in the Italian Championship. Antonelli progressed to OK-Junior—the premier under-15 international karting category—in 2019, winning six international titles: the South Garda Winter Cup, WSK Super Master Series, WSK Euro Series, WSK Open Cup, and WSK Final Cup, as well as his first Italian Championship, all with Rosberg Racing Academy. He entered his first CIK-FIA European and World Championships that year, finishing runner-up to Marcus Amand at the former after winning the final round at Le Mans and fifth at the latter. He closed his junior karting career in the United States, where he was runner-up to Brent Crews at the SKUSA SuperNationals in KA100 Junior and won both junior titles in the SKUSA Winter Series with a perfect record.

==== 2020–2021: Dominance in senior classes ====
In 2020, Antonelli progressed to the senior Original Kart (OK) class with Kart Republic, aged 13. In addition to finishing third at the South Garda Winter Cup and runner-up to Nikita Bedrin at the WSK Super Master Series, he won the WSK Euro Series and Italian Championship. As a rookie, he became the youngest senior European Champion in history, two weeks after turning 14. Antonelli retired from the final of the World Championship at Portimão with an injury; he collided with the stationary kart of Maya Weug in wet-weather conditions, suffering a broken left tibia and metatarsus. For his efforts in 2020, Antonelli was named "Rookie of the Year" by the Commission Internationale de Karting (CIK-FIA).

Antonelli moved to the professional KZ gearbox class upon his return in 2021. He struggled with braking throughout the year due to his leg injuries. Bidding to become the youngest-ever KZ World Champion—a record held by Max Verstappen since 2013—he finished fifteenth after taking pole position for the heats. He further took pole as a guest driver at Adria in the KZ European Championship. He successfully defended his OK European Championship, dominating the season with five wins from eight rounds, and finished runner-up to Rafael Câmara at the WSK Champions Cup and WSK Super Master Series. Upon his graduation to junior formulae, Vroomkart opined that Antonelli's karting career "already [foretold a] classic anthology of a champion".

=== Formula 4 (2021–2022) ===
==== 2021: Junior formulae debut ====
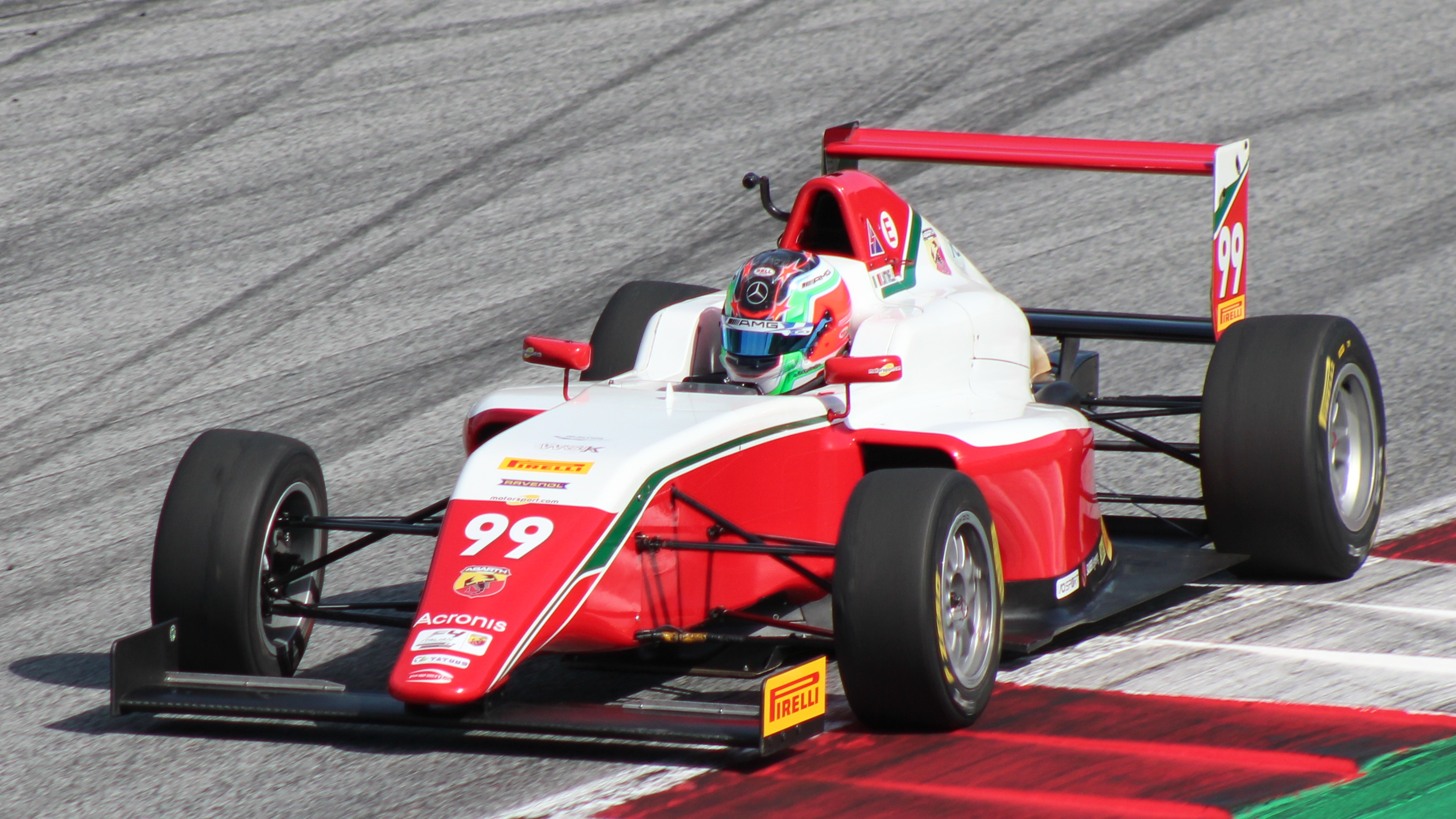
Antonelli debuted in the 2021 Italian F4 Championship at the Red Bull Ring.

Three weeks after he turned 15, Antonelli made his junior formulae debut in the fifth round of the 2021 Italian F4 Championship, driving for Prema at the Red Bull Ring. He had tested Formula 4 (F4) machinery at the circuit with his father's AKM Motorsport team in March, whilst recovering from his broken leg, as well as at Vallelunga and a five-day Ferrari Driver Academy scouting camp at Fiorano, which he was nominated for by the Automobile Club d'Italia (ACI). On debut, he finished ninth—the highest-placed rookie—in his first race and scored four points across the weekend. Antonelli scored further points in the following round at Mugello, before his breakout weekend in the final event at Monza. He finished second in the opener after a race-long battle with champion-elect Oliver Bearman and scored additional podiums in both remaining races. Antonelli finished tenth in the overall standings—having contested three of seven rounds—and fourth in the rookies' championship with four wins in the category.

==== 2022: Maiden championships and gold medal ====
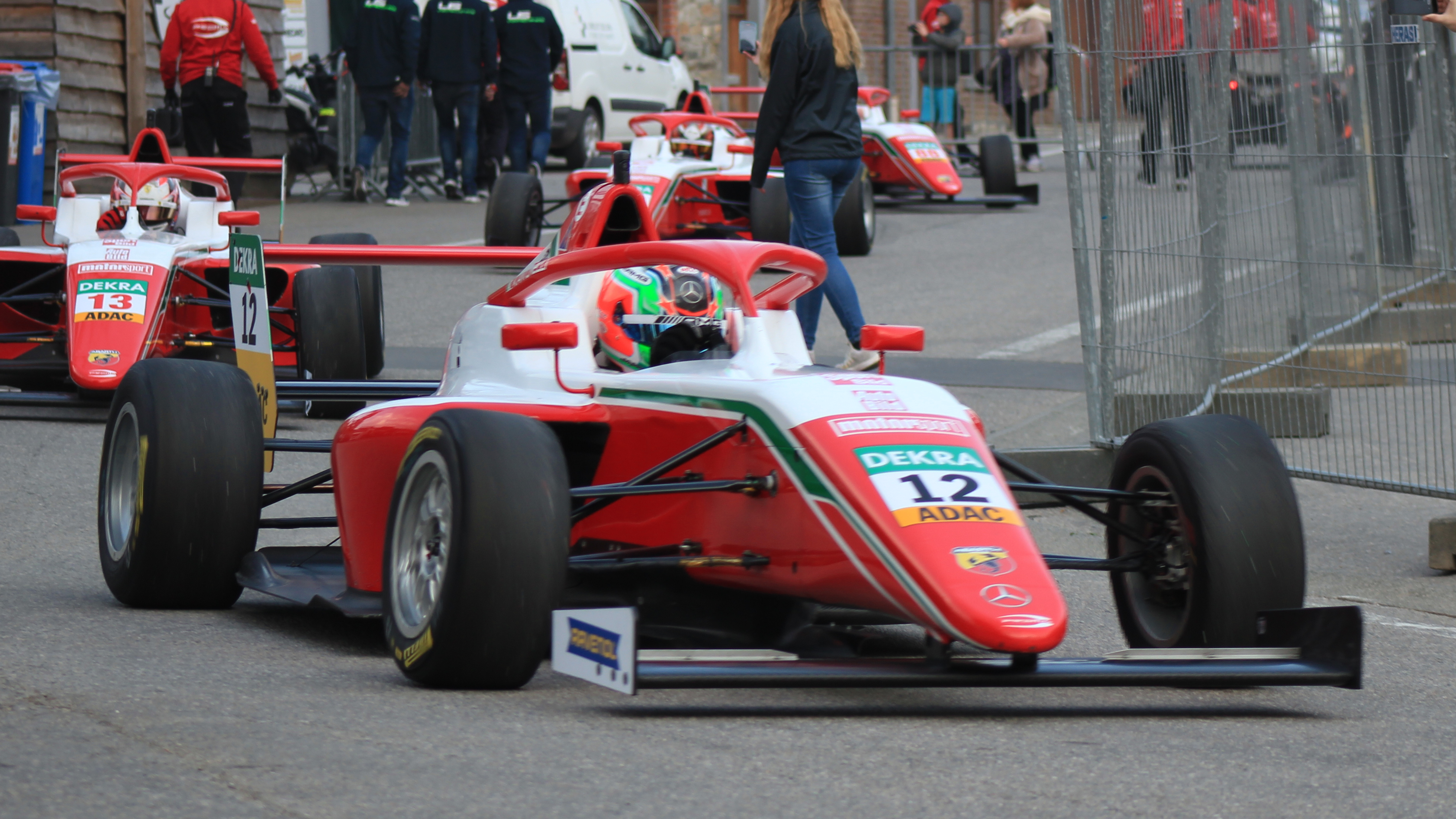
Antonelli dominated Italian F4 in 2022 with a then-record 13 victories.

In preparation for his primary campaigns with Prema in 2022, Antonelli contested select rounds of the F4 UAE Championship, now signed by the ACI as a member of its "Team Italia" by virtue of winning the Supercorso Federale in November 2021. He finished third after qualifying on pole position for the non-championship trophy round, held in support of the Abu Dhabi Grand Prix. He was originally set to only contest round three of the main championship, but a COVID-19 diagnosis for karting rival Rafael Câmara saw Antonelli replace him in the season-opener, where he took three consecutive on-track victories, demoted to third in the latter following a post-race penalty. Another podium in the reverse-grid final race saw him lead the championship by 34 points; he did not contest the second round, as planned.

Accumulating another podium in the final race of round three at Dubai—again being penalised from victory—Antonelli ended eighth in the standings after contesting two of five rounds. He remained in Italian F4 for the first of his main campaigns, taking pole for the Imola season-opener before retiring with a gearbox issue. He received front wing damage after clipping a kerb in race two, and was penalised for a collision with teammate James Wharton in the final race which demoted him from fourth to tenth. His fortunes changed with two wins in the next round at Misano, followed by six consecutive victories at Spa-Francorchamps and Vallelunga—where he took three grands chelems—which propelled him to lead the standings ahead of Câmara. Further wins at the Red Bull Ring and Monza consolidated his championship advantage, with his streak of seven consecutive victories ended by a puncture, prior to clinching the title with victory in the first race of the season-ending Mugello round. He won the remaining two races, ending the season on a then-record 13 victories as a rookie.

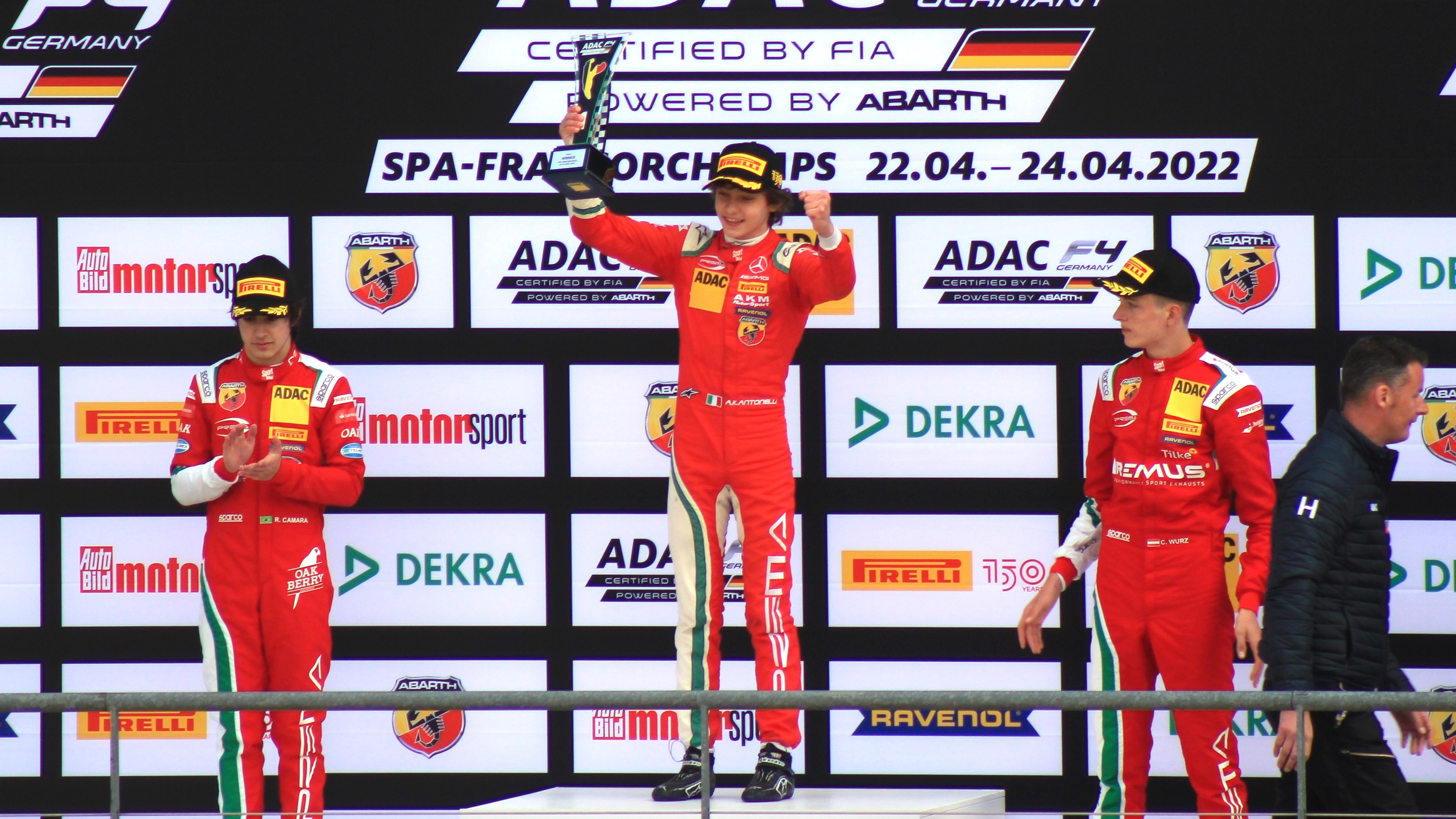
Antonelli further claimed the ADAC F4 title, followed by a gold medal at the FIA Motorsport Games.

In parallel with his Italian programme, Antonelli also competed in the Germany-based ADAC F4 Championship. He seized two victories in the first round at Spa-Francorchamps, before taking all available wins, poles, and fastest laps at the Hockenheimring. He added two further consecutive wins at Zandvoort before missing out on another clean-sweep by 0.058 seconds to Conrad Laursen in the reverse-grid race. After Prema skipped the penultimate event at the Lausitzring, Antonelli clinched the championship with one race to spare, having taken victory in the first two races during a rain-affected final round at the Nürburgring.

Following his maiden titles, the ACI selected Antonelli to represent Team Italy in the F4 Cup of the biennial FIA Motorsport Games at Paul Ricard. After securing pole by over half-a-second to Charlie Wurz, he won both the qualifying and main races whilst driving with a broken left wrist—owing to a collision near the end of qualifying—to take the gold medal and secure Italy's victory in the overall medal table. He stated that he experienced "a lot of pain" and could not drive properly, requiring painkillers to continue. He subsequently received a €10,000 grant from chassis manufacturer KC Motorgroup to support his 2023 campaigns. Antonelli graduated from F4 with 26 wins, 24 pole positions, and 37 podium finishes in 57 appearances, becoming the second-most successful driver in the history of the discipline. Roger Gascoigne of Formula Scout opined that Antonelli was "in a class of his own" as he received the highest driver awards from the ACI and Autosprint.

=== Formula Regional (2023) ===
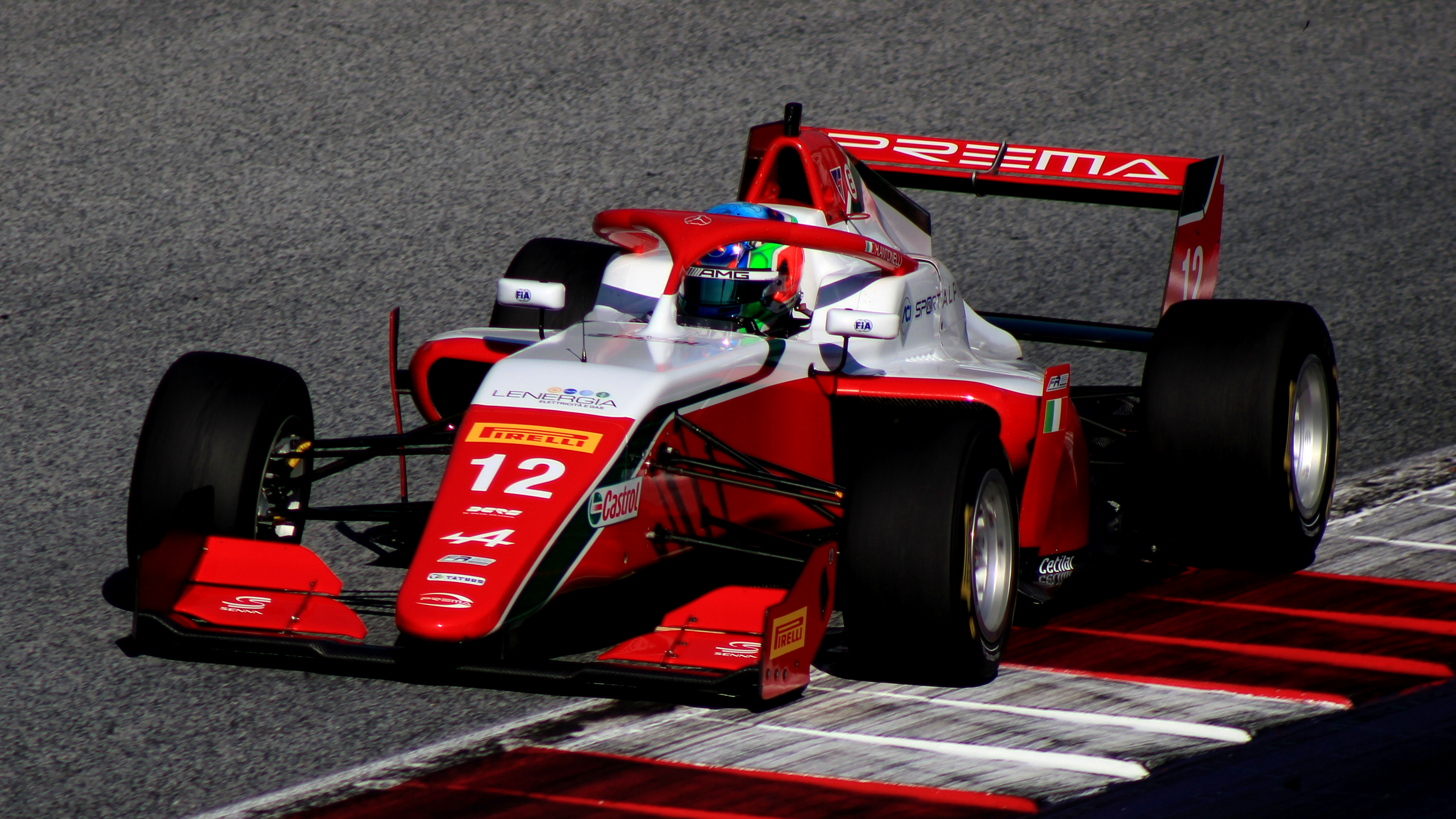
Antonelli won both the European and Middle East Championships in his first season of Formula Regional.

Prior to his main 2023 campaign in Formula Regional, Antonelli contested the Middle East Championship with Mumbai Falcons. He opened the season with a trio of second-placed finishes across the opening two rounds, propelling him to the championship lead. He consolidated his advantage with three wins at the third and fourth rounds in Kuwait and Dubai, respectively. He led title rival Taylor Barnard of PHM by 37 points going into the final round at Yas Marina, where he received a penalty for colliding with Barnard whilst battling for the lead in race one. Antonelli secured the title with a race to spare, as well as his seventh podium in the final race. He then progressed to the European Championship, remaining with Prema alongside Lorenzo Fluxá and career rival Rafael Câmara.

Antonelli expressed that he was still "lacking a bit of experience", so progression to FIA Formula 3 was "a bit early for [him]". Prior to the season, Marcus Simmons of Autosport compared the intrigue surrounding his campaign to the Formula Three (F3) debuts of Ayrton Senna, Mika Häkkinen, and Max Verstappen, whilst Salvo Sardina of La Gazzetta dello Sport described him as a "predestinato" (lit. 'predestined'). His season started with a second-place at Imola, repeating this feat in both races at Barcelona-Catalunya. A gear selection issue denied his first victory at the Hungaroring, before finally clinching victory in the second race at Spa-Francorchamps, which was marred by the fatal accident of Dilano van 't Hoff.

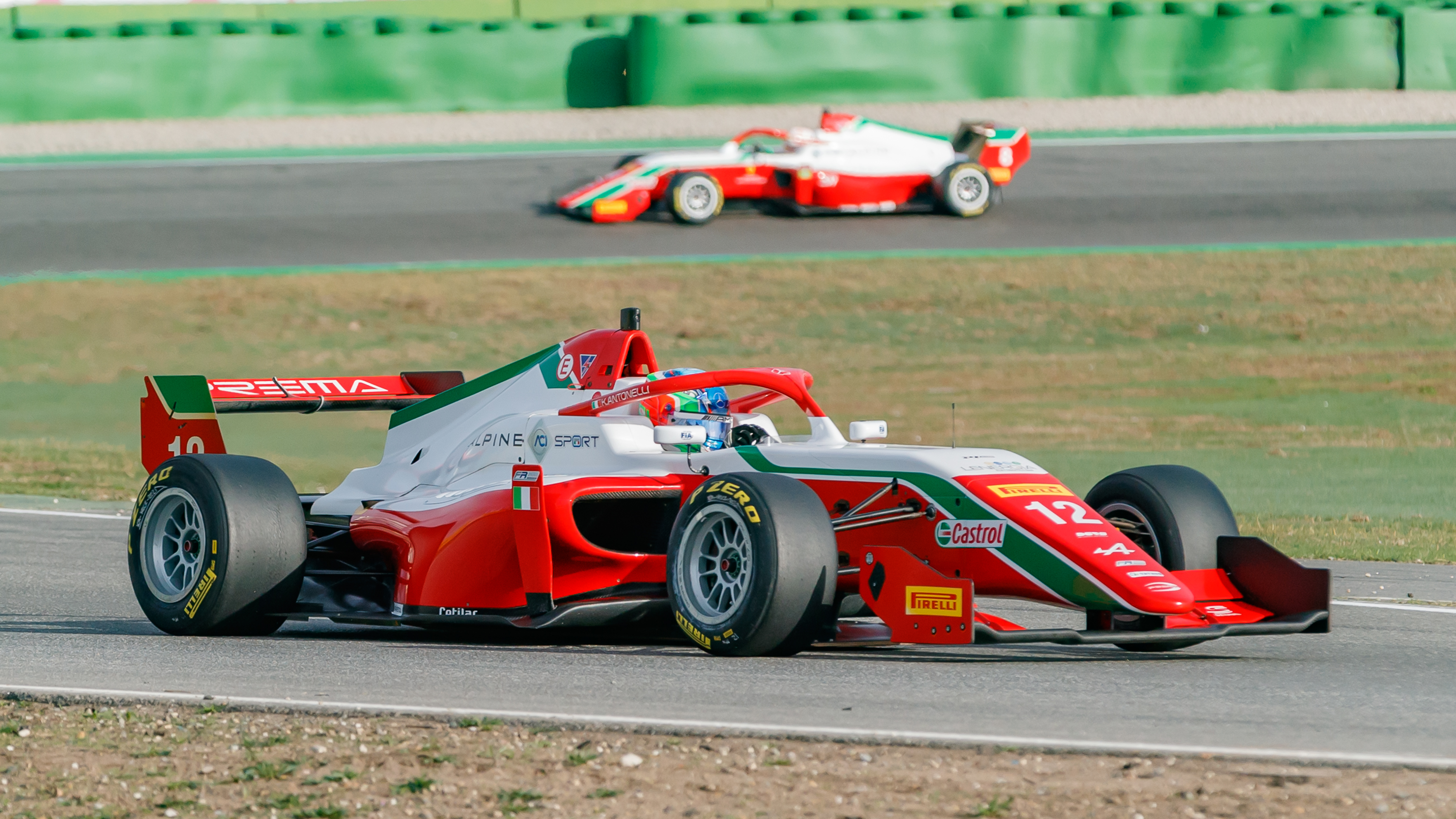
Antonelli became the first European to win multiple F3-level championships in a year since Alain Prost in 1979.

Additional wins from pole position at Mugello and Paul Ricard followed for Antonelli, who became the championship leader into the summer break, ahead of Martinius Stenshorne. He earned another podium at the Red Bull Ring following a penalty for Stenshorne, before achieving two on-track victories at Monza; he was stripped of the first win for illegal use of the push-to-pass system. Upon his dominant victory in the second race at Zandvoort—winning by over 12 seconds in mixed-weather conditions after starting eighth—Antonelli clinched the championship, becoming the first European to win multiple F3-level championships in a year since Alain Prost in 1979. He later described the win as "one of [his] best races". Antonelli dedicated his title to Van 't Hoff and was voted driver of the season by the team principals. He ended the season with five wins from 11 podiums and four pole positions, finishing 39 points ahead of Stenshorne and 61 points ahead of Tim Tramnitz. Formula Scout ranked Antonelli as the best driver in junior formulae throughout 2023.

=== FIA Formula 2 (2024) ===
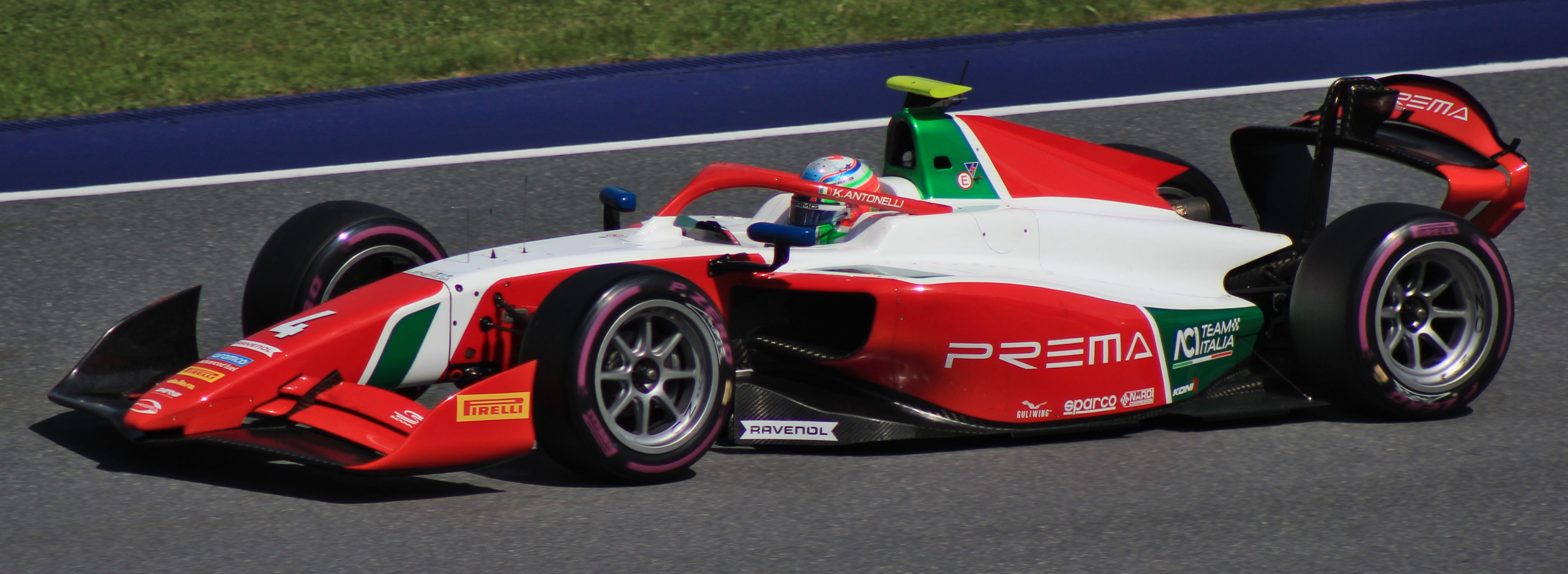
Antonelli (pictured in Spielberg) progressed to FIA Formula 2 with Prema in 2024.

Antonelli bypassed the international FIA Formula 3 Championship, progressing directly to FIA Formula 2 in 2024 with Prema, alongside Ferrari Driver Academy member Oliver Bearman. Ahead of the season, Antonelli remarked that he "[did not] want to set any expectation [sic]" amidst early rumours of his Formula One prospects for 2025. Prema struggled to adapt to new regulations utilising ground effect, with Antonelli claiming a single point at the season-opener in Sakhir after finishing fourteenth in the sprint race and tenth in the feature, ahead of Bearman in both races. He secured a pair of sixth-placed finishes the following round in Jeddah. After qualifying second in Melbourne, he spun into the gravel whilst making up places in the reverse-grid sprint, (Note: In the 2024 FIA Formula 2 Championship, the top 10 qualifiers were subjected to a reverse-grid in the sprint race.) before battling with Dennis Hauger for the lead of the feature, where he ultimately finished fourth. Antonelli again finished fourth in both the Imola feature and Monaco sprint, ending the latter weekend seventh in the feature. After placing outside of the points in Barcelona and Spielberg, Antonelli sat ninth in the standings halfway through the season; Toto Wolff commented that Mercedes were unfazed by his results and that "a champion needs to be thrown in the cold water".

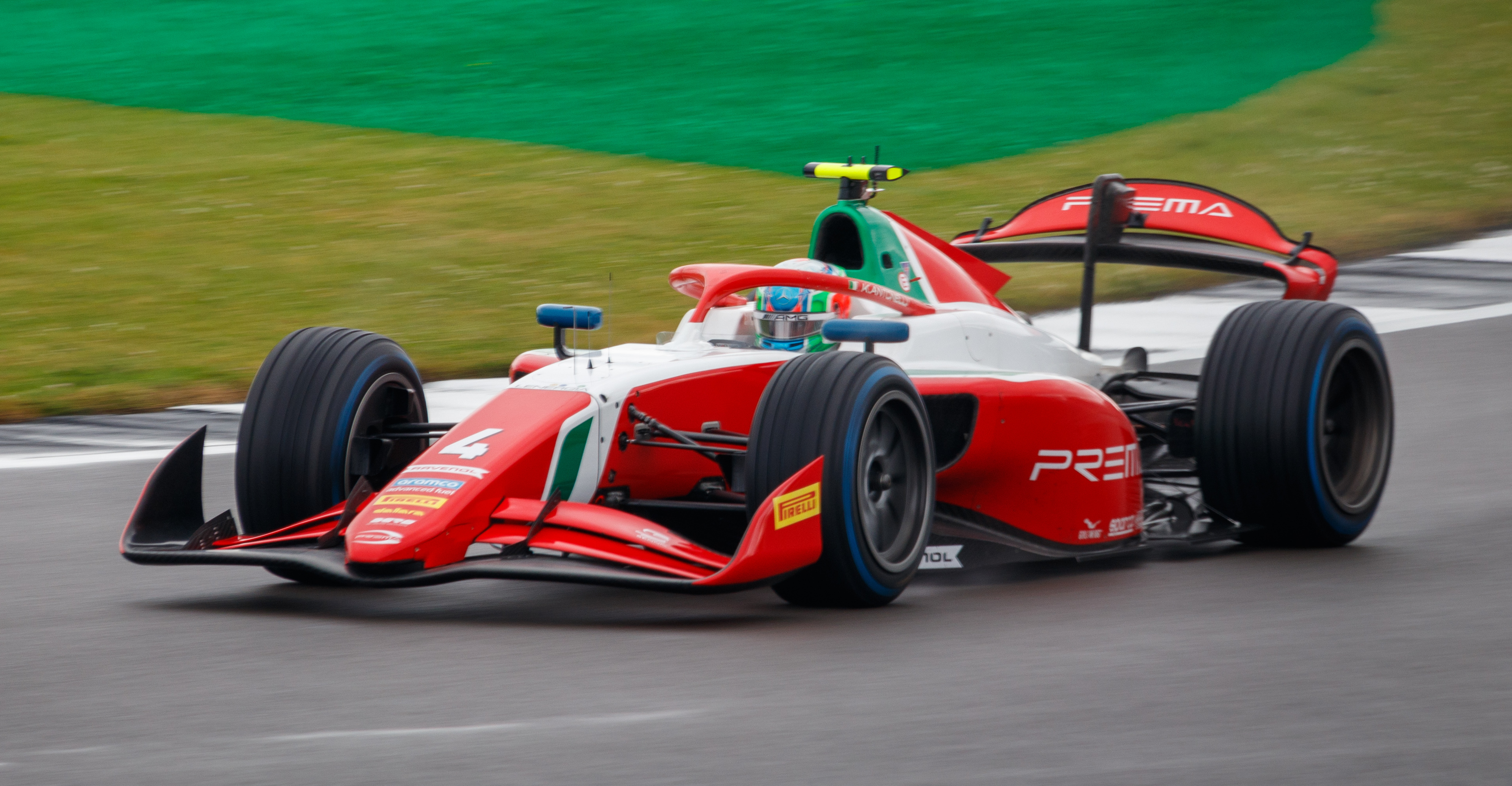
Antonelli took his maiden F2 victory at the rain-affected Silverstone round.

Antonelli qualified tenth at Silverstone, putting him on pole for the rain-affected sprint. After three safety cars and a red flag, Antonelli secured his maiden win and podium in his eighth F2 round. He retired from the feature, following a first-lap collision with Kush Maini. In Budapest, a gamble on option tyres saw him lead the majority of the sprint, but forced him to make an unscheduled pit stop after a loss of tyre performance. The following day, Antonelli took his first feature race victory after starting seventh on the grid, elevating him to sixth in the standings. He finished sixth in the curtailed Spa-Francorchamps sprint after an award-winning overtake on Franco Colapinto into Eau Rouge, before finishing ninth in the feature following a slow pit stop; he then received a ten-place grid penalty—for Prema's usage of dry ice as a cooling agent—which applied at the Monza sprint, where he was involved in a multi-car collision. He placed fourth in the feature, following a contentious battle with teammate Bearman.

Antonelli missed out on his maiden pole position by seventeen-thousandths of a second in Baku, finishing seventh in the sprint and third in the feature, after contact with Zane Maloney in the latter. He retired from both races in Lusail, subsequent to a collision with Maini in the sprint and Richard Verschoor in the feature, the latter released unsafely into his path in the pit lane. Antonelli withdrew from the season-ending round at Yas Marina with illness, finishing the season sixth in the standings on 113 points with two victories from three podiums, 38 ahead of teammate Bearman in twelfth.

== Formula One career ==
In April 2019, Mercedes announced that Antonelli had joined its Junior Team at the age of 12. In a move contrasted to that of Lewis Hamilton to McLaren in 1998, he had rejected preliminary advances from the Ferrari Driver Academy, which he was too young to join. On 17–18 April 2024, Antonelli conducted his first two-day test with the team, driving the W12 at the Red Bull Ring. He completed further private tests in the W13 at Imola, Silverstone, Barcelona-Catalunya, and Spa-Francorchamps. Following a new rule that re-allowed drivers to hold an FIA Super Licence at the minimum age of 17, Antonelli was rumoured to replace Logan Sargeant at Williams midway through the 2024 season; Mercedes denied the move, instead recommending Mick Schumacher for the position.

Antonelli made his free practice debut at the 2024 Italian Grand Prix, taking part in the first session in George Russell's W15. He set the fastest lap before he spun at the Curva Alboreto corner 10 minutes into the session, colliding with the tyre barrier at 52 g (510 m/s^{2}; 1,700 ft/s^{2}). Toto Wolff defended Antonelli after the crash, whilst Mark Hughes of Motor Sport compared his free practice debut to that of Tazio Nuvolari. Antonelli entered another free practice session at the Mexico City Grand Prix, where he finished twelfth after again ending his session prematurely—sustaining floor damage whilst running over a piece of debris. He featured alongside Russell in the post-season test at Yas Marina, completing 62 laps and setting the fifth-fastest time overall. He then completed a two-day test in the W11 at Jerez.

=== Mercedes (2025–present) ===
==== 2025: Podiums in rookie season ====
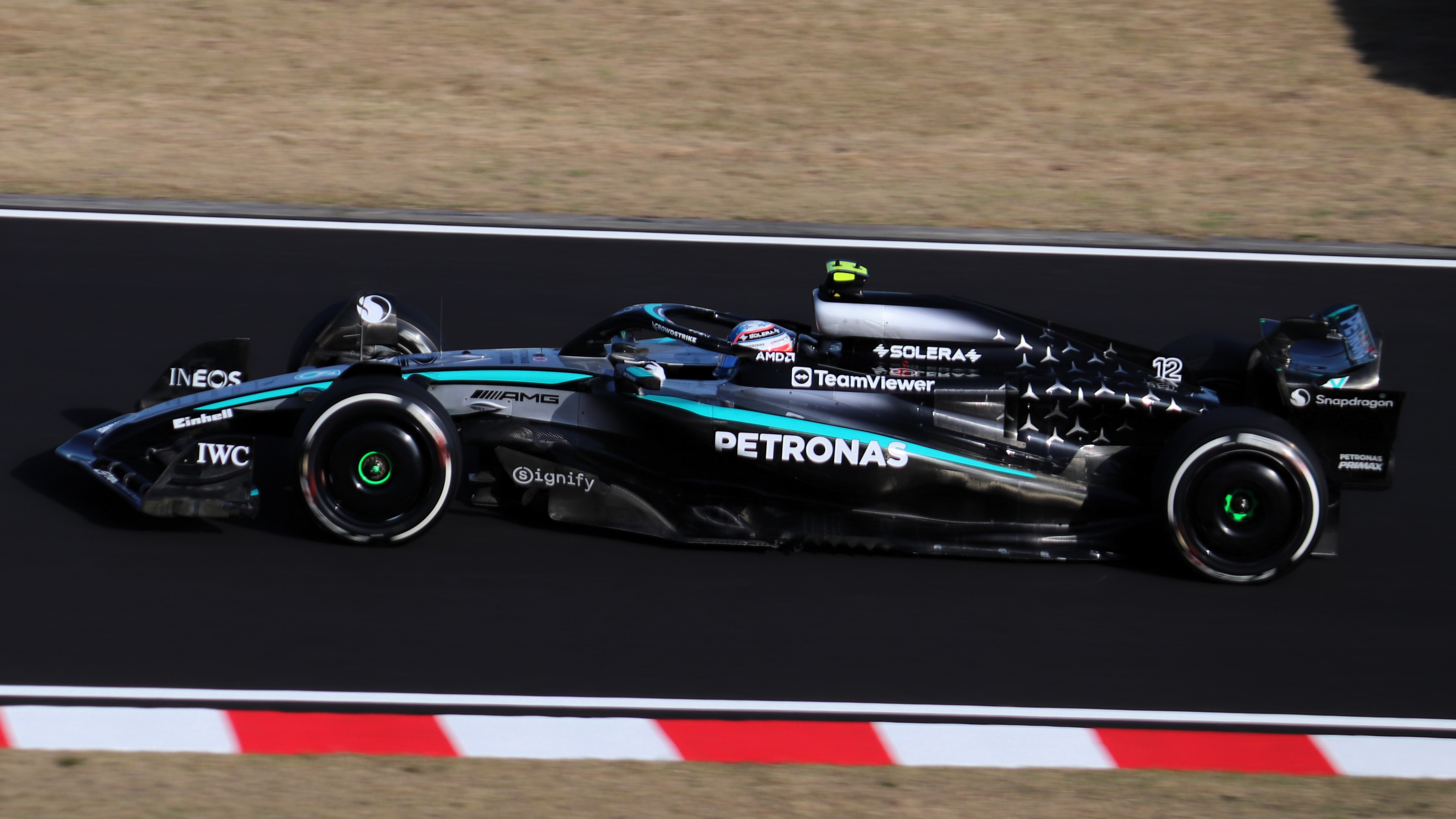
Antonelli (pictured at the Japanese Grand Prix) debuted in Formula One with Mercedes in 2025, aged 18.

Antonelli signed for Mercedes in 2025, replacing Lewis Hamilton to partner George Russell on a one-year contract. With his debut at the Australian Grand Prix, he became the first Italian driver to compete in Formula One since Antonio Giovinazzi in 2021, the first Mercedes rookie since 1954, as well as the third-youngest driver in Formula One history at 18 years and 203 days old; he qualified sixteenth with floor damage before climbing to fourth in the rain-affected Grand Prix, making several on-track overtakes and an opportune pit stop for intermediate tyres to become the second-youngest points-scorer in Formula One history and the highest-placed debutant since 2014.

After finishing seventh on his sprint debut in China, he clinched sixth in the main race after disqualifications for both Ferrari drivers, having sustained floor damage again due to debris. He qualified and finished sixth in Japan, where he became both the youngest driver to lead a race and to set a fastest lap in Formula One history. He also became the third driver to achieve three consecutive top-six finishes from debut, after Jackie Stewart (1965) and Lewis Hamilton (2007). Antonelli qualified fourth for the Bahrain Grand Prix—demoted to fifth with a grid penalty for a team error—before dropping outside the points on a three-stop strategy, finishing 11th. He finished sixth in Saudi Arabia amidst tyre wear concerns with the W16.

On pole position for the Miami Grand Prix sprint, Antonelli dropped to seventh in wet conditions after a first-corner incident with Oscar Piastri and a pit lane collision with Max Verstappen; he qualified third and finished sixth in the main race following an ill-timed virtual safety car. Suspension upgrades for his local Emilia Romagna Grand Prix contributed to high-speed instability, where he qualified 13th before retiring with a throttle issue whilst running in eighth. A barrier collision at the Nouvelle Chicane in Monaco saw him qualify 15th, before ending up last of the finishers on an alternate strategy. He again retired from the Spanish Grand Prix due to an oil pressure loss in seventh. By finishing third at the Canadian Grand Prix, holding off championship leader Piastri, Antonelli became the third-youngest podium finisher in Formula One history as teammate Russell won. He crashed into Verstappen on the first lap in Austria at Ams Ag, locking his rear brakes and forcing both drivers' retirements; he subsequently received a three-place grid penalty for the British Grand Prix, where he started 10th before being rear-ended by Isack Hadjar and retiring with diffuser damage. Seventeenth in the Belgium sprint, he qualified 18th for the Grand Prix, where he climbed to 16th after starting in the pit lane.

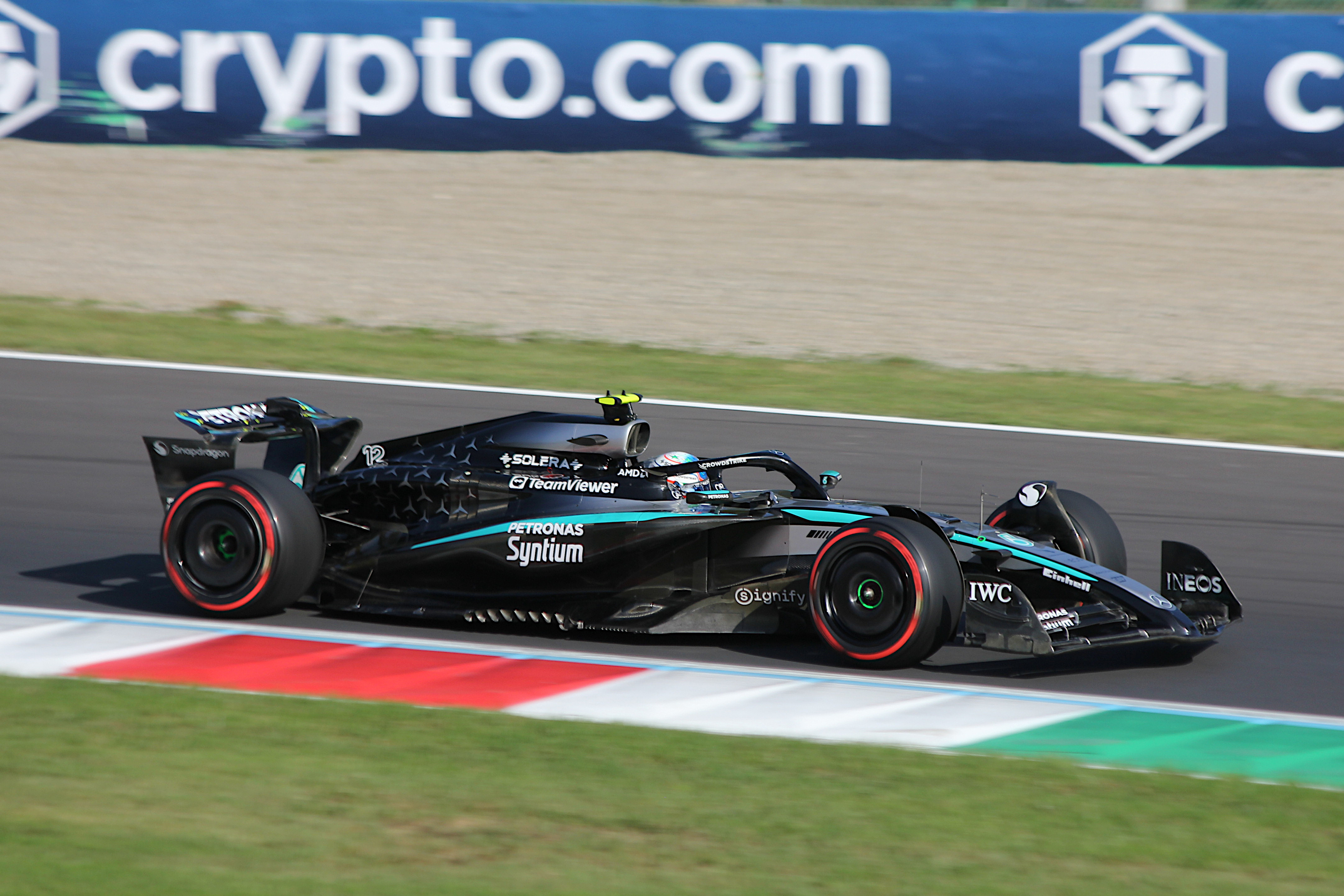
Antonelli (pictured at the Italian Grand Prix) achieved three podiums and became the highest-scoring rookie in Formula One history.

Mercedes reverted to their old rear suspension for the Hungarian Grand Prix to boost Antonelli's confidence, where he finished 10th after starting 15th following a track limits violation in qualifying. He climbed from 11th to sixth at the Dutch Grand Prix before receiving back-to-back penalties for a collision with Charles Leclerc and speeding in the pit lane, demoting him to 16th. At his first home Grand Prix in Italy, he qualified seventh—0.043 seconds behind Russell—before a slow start dropped him to 10th; initially recovering to eighth, he received a penalty for forcing Alexander Albon off track and lost a position; Toto Wolff described his performance as "underwhelming". He qualified fourth in Azerbaijan, where he battled and passed Liam Lawson for third before being overcut by Russell.

Mercedes rebounded in Singapore, where Antonelli finished fifth from fourth on the grid as Russell won. Eighth in the United States sprint, he qualified seventh for the Grand Prix before Carlos Sainz Jr. collided with and dropped him outside the points. Starting sixth in Mexico City, he climbed to fourth in the opening laps before being ordered to cede position to Russell as a counter to the advancing Piastri, who—alongside Verstappen—later passed both in the pit window and Russell returned sixth to Antonelli. He clinched second in the São Paulo sprint in a race-long battle for the lead with Lando Norris, prior to his maiden front-row start in the Grand Prix, where he held off Verstappen in the closing laps for another second place; Luke Slater of The Daily Telegraph praised his rookie-season improvements and noted it as "the first weekend where he thoroughly out-performed Russell". Heavy rain in Las Vegas saw Antonelli qualify 17th, before a second-lap stop for hard-compound tyres elevated him to fourth, fending off Piastri and Leclerc on fresh tyres; he initially dropped to fifth with a false start penalty, but claimed another podium after Piastri and Norris were disqualified. Sixth in the Qatar sprint, Antonelli finished fifth in the Grand Prix after passing Russell and conceding fourth to championship-leader Norris in the closing laps; he received death threats on social media upon unfounded speculation by Red Bull that he let Norris past. In Abu Dhabi, he qualified 14th and finished 15th.

==== 2026: Youngest World Drivers' Champion ====
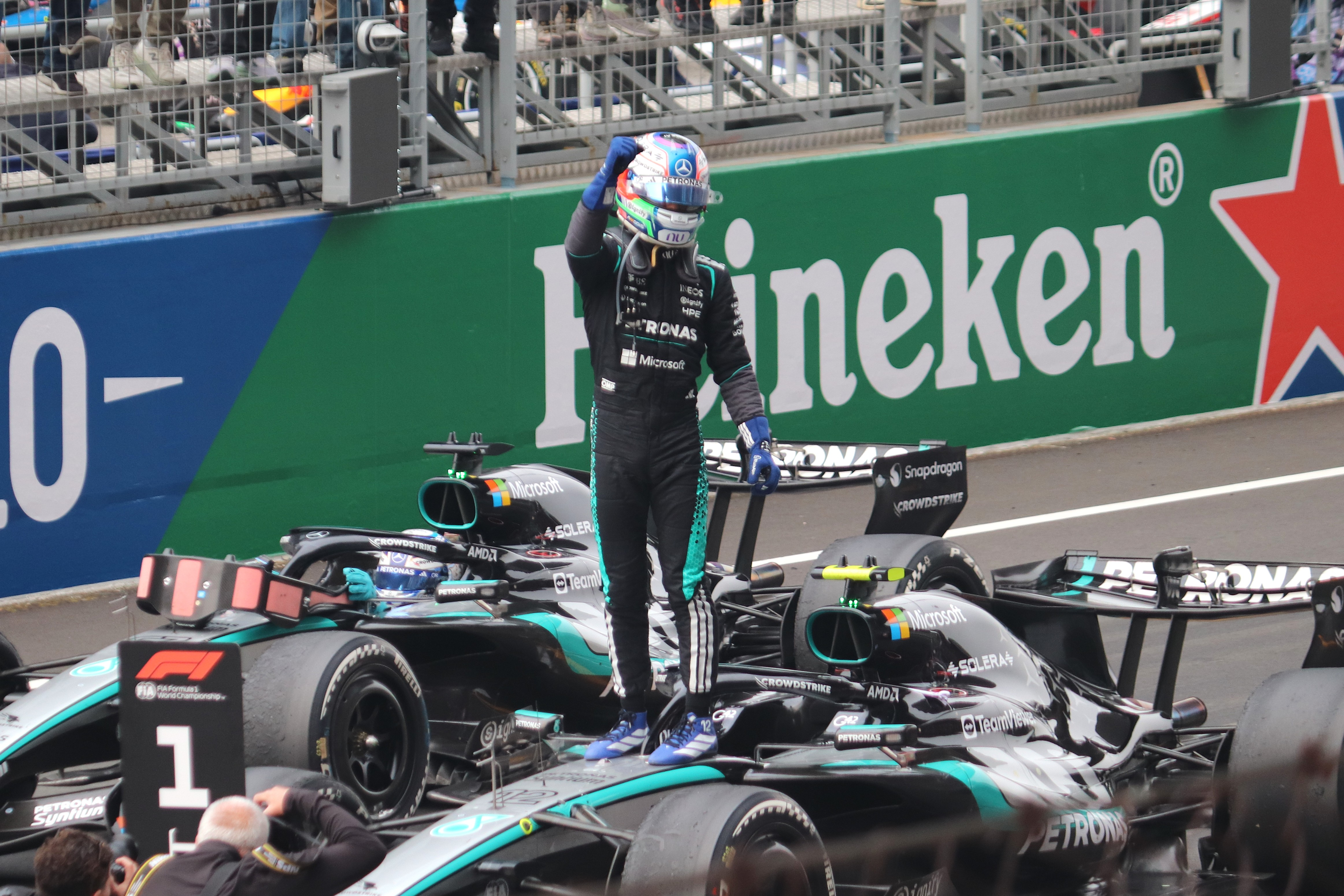
Antonelli became the youngest polesitter before taking his maiden victory at the Chinese Grand Prix in 2026.

Antonelli was confirmed to remain at Mercedes, alongside George Russell, for their 2026 "masterplan". Widely expected by insiders and bookmakers to be a contender amidst new power unit and chassis regulations, Mercedes emerged as the leading constructor over Ferrari with a superior energy recovery system on the W17. In Australia, a battery-hampered start dropped Antonelli from second to seventh before he caught the lead trio and capitalised on a Ferrari strategy miscue to complete a 1–2 finish for Mercedes. Following a fifth-place in the China sprint ensuing a slow start and a penalty for colliding with Isack Hadjar, Antonelli became the youngest polesitter in Formula One history, eclipsing Sebastian Vettel by nearly two years; he withstood an early Ferrari charge and won the main race by five seconds over Russell, further becoming the second-youngest Grand Prix winner and the first Italian victor in two decades.

Another slow start dropped him from pole to sixth in Japan, after which he capitalised on a well-timed safety car to lead and pulled a 13-second margin over Oscar Piastri to become the youngest World Drivers' Championship leader. Sixth in the Miami sprint, Antonelli held off Lando Norris to win the Grand Prix—becoming the first driver in history to convert their first three poles—and extended his lead over Russell to 20 points. Antonelli finished third in the Canada sprint amidst a contentious battle for the lead with Russell, which they continued into the Grand Prix, where Antonelli emerged victorious after several excursions for both drivers and Russell's engine failure.

Antonelli became the youngest World Drivers' Championship leader and led by 81 points after the European season.

Mercedes entered Monaco challenged by Ferrari and Red Bull, with Russell further attempting mind games in the media to quell Antonelli's momentum. Antonelli set an acclaimed "statement" lap to snatch pole from Max Verstappen, dominating the Grand Prix to become the youngest driver to score a grand chelem and to win in Monaco, as Russell fell outside the points and 68 behind Antonelli. His run of five consecutive victories—the most from a maiden win in history—was halted in Barcelona, retiring with a late engine failure immediately after passing Russell for second. His lead dropped to 25 points after he finished third in a mistake-laden weekend in Austria and fifteenth after a mechanical issue in Britain prevented a late pass on Charles Leclerc for the lead, having become the youngest-ever sprint winner and taken pole the day prior. Antonelli won the Belgian Grand Prix from pole, withstanding Leclerc and capitalising on a Russell–Lewis Hamilton collision to re-open his points advantage.

As McLaren rejuvenated in the mid-season, third- and second-place finishes for Antonelli in Hungary and the Netherlands—both ahead of Russell—extended his lead to 59 points ahead of his home Grand Prix in Italy, where Mercedes expected success and opted for him to claim a new power unit at the cost of a grid penalty. Starting 19th, Antonelli climbed to 12th prior to a third-lap red flag, fifth by lap 10, and third on lap 13, where he joined Russell and Verstappen in a lead trio; having passed Verstappen, he engaged in an 11-lap battle with Russell, until a VSC saw Antonelli pit from his less durable tyres. He subsequently gained over 15 seconds in 21 laps to pass Russell and become the first Italian victor of the Grand Prix in 60 years, doing so from the second-lowest victorious grid position in history.

Aged 20, Antonelli (left) continued his dominance and became the youngest World Drivers' Champion with four rounds left.

The advantage from his victory in Spain—having undercut Norris during a VSC whilst Russell struggled to fifth—was reversed in Azerbaijan, where Antonelli clipped an inside wall early into qualifying and recovered from 16th to fifth. Mercedes brought extensive upgrades for the Bahrain Grand Prix (Note: Held in Malaysia due to the Iran War.) to counter McLaren and Red Bull; Verstappen dominated the weekend, with Antonelli leading briefly in wet conditions before settling for second as Russell's late engine failure propelled Antonelli to an 84-point lead. With fourth in the Singapore sprint and third in the Grand Prix, both times finishing ahead of Russell, his 102-point margin meant he entered the United States Grand Prix with his first chance to clinch the title. A 13-second victory for Antonelli as Russell struggled to eighth left him needing two points from the remaining five rounds. He passed Charles Leclerc in the late stages of an eventful race to finish third in Mexico City, dethroning Sebastian Vettel as the youngest World Drivers' Champion by over three years, as well as becoming the first Italian champion since Alberto Ascari in 1953. He also became the first Champion to be born in the 21st century and the first Champion who won the first race of his career in his championship-winning season since Keke Rosberg's triumph in 1982.

==== 2027 ====
Ahead of the 2026 British Grand Prix, Antonelli was announced to be retained by Mercedes alongside Russell for 2027. Ahead of clinching the title at the 2026 Mexico City Grand Prix, Antonelli confirmed that he would not use the number 1 and keep his permanent number 12 for his title defence.

== Other racing ==
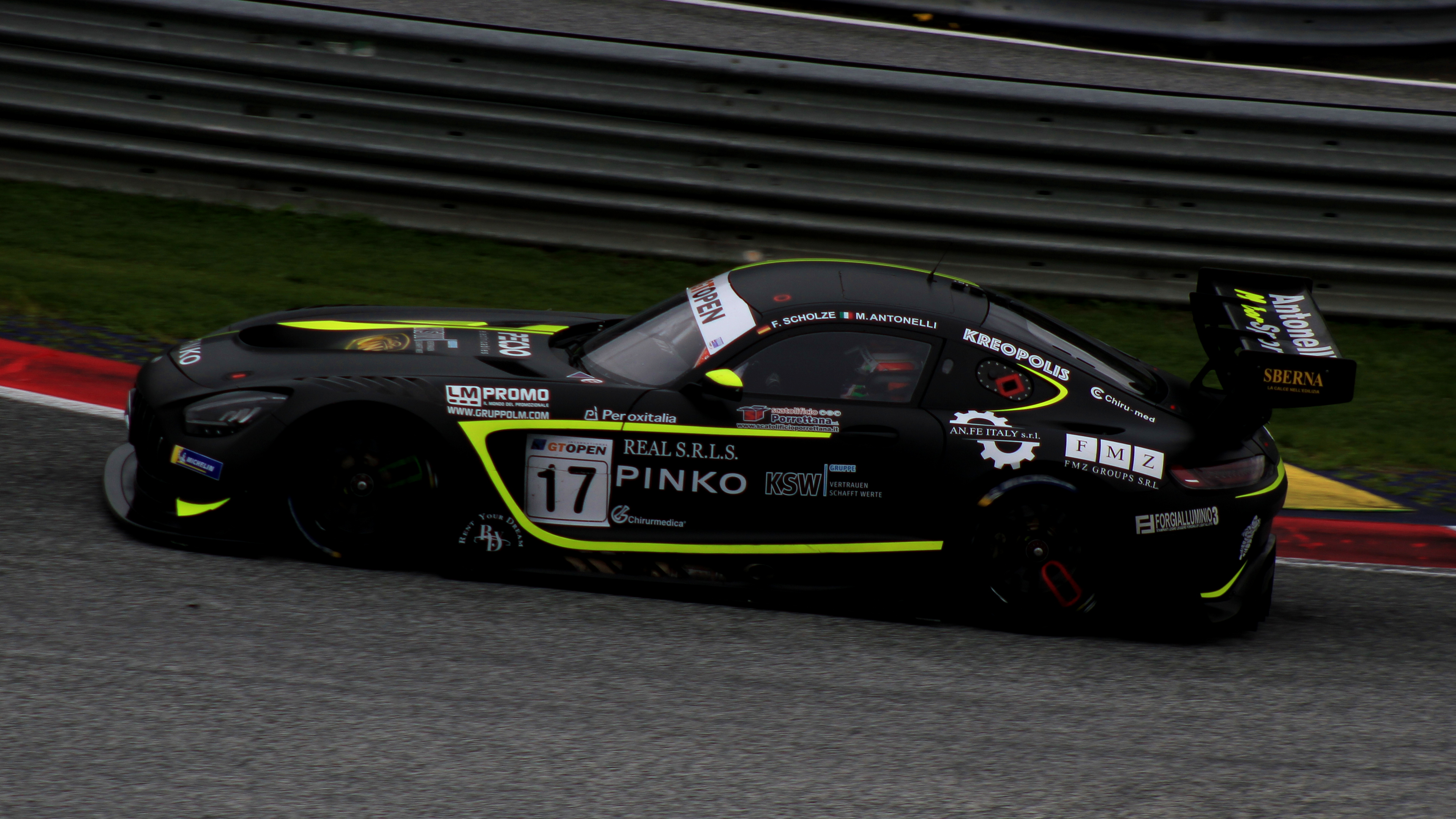
Antonelli won his debut sportscar race at the 2023 Italian GT3 Championship, driving the pictured Mercedes-AMG GT3 Evo.

In May 2023, Antonelli debuted in sportscar racing, competing for his father's AKM Motorsport outfit in the opening round of the Italian GT3 Championship at Misano, driving the Mercedes-AMG GT3 Evo. He won the first race from pole position, before securing third-place in race two with a final-corner overtake on eventual champion Jens Klingmann. Antonelli tested the GT3 Evo at Imola the following year.

Antonelli was initially set to take part in a Super Formula post-season test in December 2024, driving the Dallara SF23 alongside Prema teammate Oliver Bearman at Suzuka; he later withdrew from the test due to illness. In 2026, he served as a test driver for the Mercedes-AMG GT2 Edition W16, which featured his signature on the doorframes.

== Other ventures ==
Antonelli appeared in a cameo role as Matteo in the sports drama film Italian Race (Note: Italian: Veloce come il vento) (2016), which won four awards at the Nastro d'Argento. He co-founded the kart racing team AKM Motorsport by Kart Republic alongside his father in 2023, where he serves as a driver coach and chassis tester. He is the subject of a short documentary film, The Seat (2025), directed by Kyle Thrash and distributed by Netflix, which documented his promotion to Mercedes for 2025. He was appointed the ambassador of Italian sport for San Marino by the Congress of State in 2025 and served as a torchbearer ahead of the 2026 Winter Olympics.

== Personal life ==
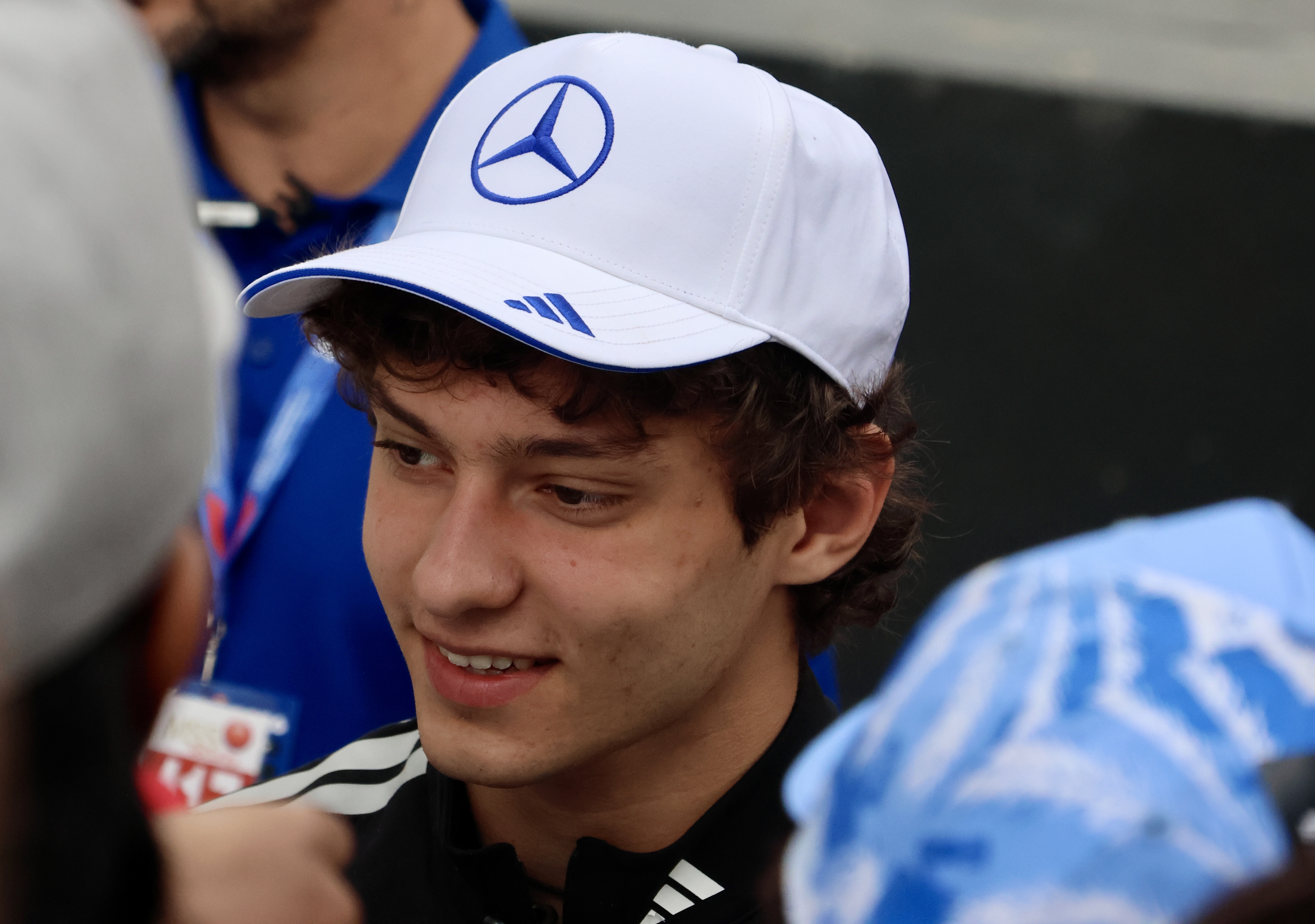
Antonelli at the 2026 Australian Grand Prix

Antonelli selected the number 12 as his personal driver number in Formula One, citing inspiration from his idol, Ayrton Senna; he also used the number throughout his 2022 and 2023 title-winning seasons in junior formulae. He passed his driving test six weeks before his Formula One debut in 2025 and continued studying online for his maturità through the first half of his rookie season. Antonelli was given a GT 63 S by Mercedes-AMG that year, but is unable to drive it in Italy for three years as its power-to-weight ratio exceeds national limits for new drivers six-fold. He received a limited-edition GT 63 PRO in January 2026 and crashed it a month later near his home in Serravalle, San Marino; he escaped unharmed.

From 2023 to 2026, Antonelli was in a relationship with Czech kart racer Eliška Bábíčková, who won the OK class of the Italian Karting Championship in the former year and is the sister of 2022 W Series driver Tereza Bábíčková—who competed against him in karts. His racing helmet uses a base colour of Savoy blue, with green, white, and red details, inspired by the national colours of Italy. He has stated that he aspires to reach the success of fellow Italian sportsmen Jannik Sinner and Valentino Rossi. Outside of motor racing, he supports the local association football and basketball clubs Bologna and Virtus Bologna, respectively. He has also expressed interest in pursuing automotive design and architecture.

== Awards and honours ==
=== Formula One ===
- Formula One World Drivers' Championship: 2026
- DHL Fastest Lap Award: 2026
- Lorenzo Bandini Trophy: 2026

=== Other awards ===
- Best Driver ESPY Award nominee: 2026
- Time 100 Sports: 2026
- Confartigianato Motori Italian on the Podium: 2025
- Dallara Award for Best Overtaking Manoeuvre: 2024
- Confartigianato Motori Rising Star: 2024
- Automobile Club d'Italia Volante d'Argento (lit. 'Silver Steering Wheel'): 2023
- Pirelli Ruotino d'Oro (lit. 'Golden Wheel'): 2023
- Autosprint Caschi d'Oro (lit. 'Golden Helmet'): 2022, 2023, 2024, 2025
- Automobile Club d'Italia Volante d'Oro (lit. 'Golden Steering Wheel'): 2022
- FIA Karting Rookie of the Year: 2020

=== Orders and special awards ===
- San Marino
  - Commander of the Order of Saint Agatha (2026)
- Italian National Olympic Committee
  - Silver Medal of Athletic Valour: 2020, 2021
- City of Bologna
  - Golden Neptune (2026)

== Karting record ==
=== Karting career summary ===
Season	Series	Team	Position
2014	Trofeo Nazionale — 60 Baby	Antonelli Motorsport	6th
2014	Coppa Italia Zona Centro — 60 Baby	Antonelli Motorsport	14th
2014	Trofeo Academy Championkart — Baby Academy	RB Racing	
2014	Championkart International Final — Baby Academy	RB Racing	2nd
2015	Trofeo Easykart Italia — Easy 60	MLG Racing	1st
2015	Trofeo Easykart Italia — Young Driver Easy 60	MLG Racing	1st
2015	Easykart International Grand Final — Easy 60	MLG Racing	1st
2015	Trofeo Nazionale — 60 Mini	RB Racing	44th
2015	WSK Night Edition — 60 Mini	Praga Kart Racing	22nd
2015	WSK Final Cup — 60 Mini	Antonelli Motorsport	31st
2016	WSK Champions Cup — 60 Mini	RB Racing	NC
2016	Andrea Margutti Trophy — 60 Mini	RB Racing	18th
2016	WSK Super Master Series — 60 Mini	RB Racing	21st
2016	KRS Open Series — 60 Mini	Antonelli Motorsport	
2016	WSK Night Edition — 60 Mini	Marco Antonelli	15th
2016	Italian Championship — 60 Mini	RB Racing	16th
2016	Coppa Italia — 60 Mini	Morsicani Racing	3rd
2016	Trofeo delle Industrie — 60 Mini	Giugliano Kart	3rd
2016	WSK Final Cup — 60 Mini	RB Racing	6th
2017	WSK Champions Cup — 60 Mini	Tony Kart Racing Team	6th
2017	South Garda Winter Cup — Mini ROK	Tony Kart Racing Team	19th
2017	WSK Super Master Series — 60 Mini	Tony Kart Racing Team	3rd
2017	Italian Championship — 60 Mini	Tony Kart Racing Team	8th
2017	ROK Cup Italy Nord Region — Mini ROK	Antonelli Motorsport	116th
2017	ROK Cup Italy — Mini ROK	Antonelli Motorsport	8th
2017	ROK Cup International Final — Mini ROK	Antonelli Motorsport	24th
2017	WSK Final Cup — 60 Mini	Tony Kart Racing Team	22nd
2018	WSK Champions Cup — 60 Mini	Energy Corse	1st
2018	South Garda Winter Cup — Mini ROK	Energy Corse	1st
2018	WSK Super Master Series — 60 Mini	Energy Corse	3rd
2018	WSK Open Cup — 60 Mini	Energy Corse	6th
2018	Italian Championship — 60 Mini	Energy Corse	2nd
2018	Trofeo d'Autunno — Mini ROK	Energy Corse	3rd
2018	ROK Cup Challenge — Mini ROK	Energy Corse	1st
2018	ROK Cup International Final — Mini ROK	Energy Corse	1st
2018	WSK Final Cup — OK-J	KR Motorsport	5th
2019	WSK Champions Cup — OK-J	Rosberg Racing Academy	4th
2019	South Garda Winter Cup — OK-J	Rosberg Racing Academy	1st
2019	WSK Super Master Series — OK-J	Rosberg Racing Academy	1st
2019	WSK Euro Series — OK-J	Rosberg Racing Academy	1st
2019	Coupe de France — OK-J	Rosberg Racing Academy	4th
2019	Italian Championship — OK-J	Rosberg Racing Academy	1st
2019	Italian Championship — X30 Junior	Rosberg Racing Academy	8th
2019	CIK-FIA European Championship — OK-J	Rosberg Racing Academy	2nd
2019	CIK-FIA World Championship — OK-J	Rosberg Racing Academy	5th
2019	WSK Open Cup — OK-J	Rosberg Racing Academy	1st
2019	WSK Final Cup — OK-J	Rosberg Racing Academy	1st
2019	SKUSA SuperNationals — KA100 Junior	KartSport North America	2nd
2019	SKUSA SuperNationals — X30 Junior	KartSport North America	36th
2020	SKUSA Winter Series — KA100 Junior	KartSport North America	1st
2020	SKUSA Winter Series — X30 Junior	KartSport North America	1st
2020	WSK Champions Cup — OK	KR Motorsport	NC
2020	South Garda Winter Cup — OK	KR Motorsport	3rd
2020	WSK Super Master Series — OK	KR Motorsport	2nd
2020	CIK-FIA European Championship — OK	KR Motorsport	1st
2020	Italian Championship — OK	KR Motorsport	1st
2020	WSK Euro Series — OK	KR Motorsport	1st
2020	Champions of the Future — OK	KR Motorsport	9th
2020	CIK-FIA World Championship — OK	KR Motorsport	35th
2021	WSK Champions Cup — OK	KR Motorsport	2nd
2021	WSK Super Master Series — OK	KR Motorsport	2nd
2021	WSK Euro Series — KZ2	KR Motorsport	46th
2021	WSK Euro Series — OK	KR Motorsport	7th
2021	Champions of the Future — OK	KR Motorsport	8th
2021	CIK-FIA European Championship — OK	KR Motorsport	1st
2021	CIK-FIA European Championship — KZ	KR Motorsport	NC†
2021	CIK-FIA World Championship — KZ	KR Motorsport	15th
2022	Champions of the Future Winter Series — KZ2	KR Motorsport	34th
Source: (Note: Additional references are stated in § Karting (2014–2021).)

^{†} As Antonelli was a guest driver, he was ineligible for championship points.

=== Complete CIK-FIA results ===
==== Complete CIK-FIA World Championship results ====
Year	Entrant	Class	Circuit	QH	F
2019	Rosberg Racing Academy	OK-J	(Finland) Alahärmä	3rd	5th
2020	KR Motorsport	OK	(Portugal) Portimão	9th	DNS
2021	KR Motorsport	KZ	(Sweden) Kristianstad	4th	15th

==== Complete CIK-FIA European Championship results ====
(key) (Races in bold indicate pole position; races in italics indicate fastest lap)

Year	Entrant	Class	1	2	3	4	5	6	7	8	Pos	Points
2019	Rosberg Racing Academy	OK-J	ANG; QH; 32	ANG; F 16	GEN; QH; 12	GEN; F 6	**KRI**; **QH**; 3	KRI; F 5	LEM; QH; 2	LEM; F 1	2nd	63
2020	KR Motorsport	OK	ZUE; QH; 4	ZUE; F 1	SAR; QH (5)	SAR; F (2)	**WAC**; **QH**; 1	**WAC**; **F** 1			1st	67
2021	KR Motorsport	OK	GEN; QH; 19	GEN; F (7)	AUB; QH; 1	**AUB**; **F** 1	**SAR**; **QH**; 3	SAR; F 1	**ZUE**; **QH**; 1	**ZUE**; **F** 1	1st	103
2021	KR Motorsport	KZ	WAC; QH	WAC; F	**ADR**; **QH**; 6	ADR; F 9					NC†	—

^{†} As Antonelli was a guest driver, he was ineligible for championship points.

== Racing record ==
=== Racing career summary ===
Season	Series	Team	Races	Wins	Poles	F/Laps	Podiums	Points	Position
2021	Italian F4 Championship	Prema Powerteam	9	0	0	0	3	54	10th
2021	Formula 4 UAE Championship – Trophy Round	Abu Dhabi Racing by Prema	1	0	1	0	1	—N/a	3rd
2022	Formula 4 UAE Championship	Prema Racing	4	2	1	2	4	117	8th
2022	Formula 4 UAE Championship	Abu Dhabi Racing by Prema	4	0	0	1	1	117	8th
2022	Italian F4 Championship	Prema Racing	20	13	14	14	15	362	1st
2022	ADAC Formula 4	Prema Racing	15	9	7	8	12	313	1st
2022	FIA Motorsport Games Formula 4 Cup	Team Italy	1	1	1	1	1	—N/a	1st
2023	Formula Regional Middle East Championship	Mumbai Falcons Racing Limited	15	3	3	5	7	192	1st
2023	Formula Regional European Championship	Prema Racing	20	5	4	5	11	300	1st
2023	Italian GT Championship – GT3 Pro	AKM Motorsport	2	1	1	2	2	—N/a	NC†
2024	FIA Formula 2 Championship	Prema Racing	26	2	0	4	3	113	6th
2024	Formula One	Mercedes-AMG Petronas F1 Team	Test driver						
2025	Formula One	Mercedes-AMG Petronas F1 Team	24	0	0	3	3	150	7th
2026	Formula One	Mercedes-AMG Petronas F1 Team	20	9	7	8	16	390*	1st

^{†} As Antonelli was a guest driver, he was ineligible for championship points.
* Season still in progress.

=== Complete Italian F4 Championship results ===
(key) (Races in bold indicate pole position; races in italics indicate fastest lap)

Year	Entrant	1	2	3	4	5	6	7	8	9	10	11	12	13	14	15	16	17	18	19	20	21	22	Pos	Points
2021	Prema Powerteam	LEC; 1	LEC; 2	LEC; 3	MIS; 1	MIS; 2	MIS; 3	VLL; 1	VLL; 2	VLL; 3	IMO; 1	IMO; 2	IMO; 3	RBR; 1; 9	RBR; 2; 12	RBR; 3; 9	MUG; 1; 10	MUG; 2; 10	MUG; 3; 13	MNZ; 1; 2	MNZ; 2; 3	MNZ; 3; 3		10th	54
2022	Prema Racing	**IMO**; **1**; 25†	IMO; 2; 24	IMO; 3; 10	**MIS**; **1**; 1	**MIS**; **2**; 1	**MIS**; **3**; 2	**SPA**; **1**; 1	**SPA**; **2**; 1	SPA; 3; 1	**VLL**; **1**; 1	**VLL**; **2**; 1	**VLL**; **3**; 1	RBR; 1	**RBR**; **2**; 1	**RBR**; **3**; 23	RBR; 4; 2	MNZ; 1; 11	**MNZ**; **2**; 1	MNZ; 3 C	**MUG**; **1**; 1	**MUG**; **2**; 1	MUG; 3; 1	1st	362

^{†} Did not finish, but was classified as he had completed more than 90% of the race distance.

=== Complete Formula 4 UAE Championship results ===
(key) (Races in bold indicate pole position; races in italics indicate fastest lap)

Year	Entrant	1	2	3	4	5	6	7	8	9	10	11	12	13	14	15	16	17	18	19	20	Pos	Points
2022	Prema Racing	YMC1; 1; 1	YMC1; 2; 1	**YMC1**; **3**; 3	YMC1; 4; 2	DUB1; 1	DUB1; 2	DUB1; 3	DUB1; 4													8th	117
2022	Abu Dhabi Racing by Prema									DUB2; 1; 4	DUB2; 2 Ret	DUB2; 3; 10	DUB2; 4; 2	DUB3; 1	DUB3; 2	DUB3; 3	DUB3; 4	YMC2; 1	YMC2; 2	YMC2; 3	YMC2; 4	8th	117

=== Complete ADAC Formula 4 results ===
(key) (Races in bold indicate pole position; races in italics indicate fastest lap)

Year	Entrant	1	2	3	4	5	6	7	8	9	10	11	12	13	14	15	16	17	18	Pos	Points
2022	Prema Racing	**SPA**; **1**; 1	**SPA**; **2**; 1	SPA; 3; 4	**HOC**; **1**; 1	**HOC**; **2**; 1	HOC; 3; 1	**ZAN**; **1**; 1	**ZAN**; **2**; 1	ZAN; 3; 2	**NÜR1**; **1**; 2	NÜR1; 2; 2	NÜR1; 3; 4	LAU; 1	LAU; 2	LAU; 3	NÜR2; 1; 1	NÜR2; 2; 1	NÜR2; 3; 6	1st	313

=== Complete FIA Motorsport Games results ===
Year	Entrant	Competition	Qualifying	Quali race	Main race
2022	Team Italy	Formula 4 Cup	1st	1st	1st

=== Complete Formula Regional Middle East Championship results ===
(key) (Races in bold indicate pole position; races in italics indicate fastest lap)

Year	Entrant	1	2	3	4	5	6	7	8	9	10	11	12	13	14	15	Pos	Points
2023	Mumbai Falcons Racing Limited	DUB1; 1; 4	DUB1; 2; 6	**DUB1**; **3**; 2	KUW1; 1; 2	KUW1; 2 Ret	KUW1; 3; 2	KUW2; 1; 1	KUW2; 2; 1	KUW2; 3; 4	**DUB2**; **1**; 1	DUB2; 2; 10	DUB2; 3; 4	**ABU**; **1**; 15	ABU; 2; 13	ABU; 3; 2	1st	192

=== Complete Formula Regional European Championship results ===
(key) (Races in bold indicate pole position; races in italics indicate fastest lap)

Year	Entrant	1	2	3	4	5	6	7	8	9	10	11	12	13	14	15	16	17	18	19	20	Pos	Points
2023	Prema Racing	IMO; 1; 2	IMO; 2 Ret	**CAT**; **1**; 2	CAT; 2; 2	HUN; 1; 5	HUN; 2; 6	SPA; 1; 4	SPA; 2; 1	MUG; 1; 2	**MUG**; **2**; 1	LEC; 1; 5	**LEC**; **2**; 1	RBR; 1; 4	RBR; 2; 3	MNZ; 1; 11	**MNZ**; **2**; 1	ZAN; 1; 2	ZAN; 2; 1	HOC; 1; 6	HOC; 2; 6	1st	300

=== Complete Italian GT Championship results ===
(key) (Races in bold indicate pole position; races in italics indicate fastest lap)

Year	Entrant	Car	Class	1	2	3	4	5	6	7	8	Pos	Points
2023	AKM Motorsport	Mercedes-AMG GT3 Evo	GT3 Pro	**MIS**; **1**; 1	MIS; 2; 3	MNZ; 1	MNZ; 2	MUG; 1	MUG; 2	IMO; 1	IMO; 2	NC†	—

^{†} As Antonelli was a guest driver, he was ineligible for championship points.

=== Complete FIA Formula 2 Championship results ===
(key) (Races in bold indicate pole position; races in italics indicate points for the fastest lap of the top-10 finishers)

Year	Entrant	1	2	3	4	5	6	7	8	9	10	11	12	13	14	15	16	17	18	19	20	21	22	23	24	25	26	27	28	Pos	Points
2024	Prema Racing	BHR; SPR; 14	BHR; FEA; 10	JED; SPR; 6	JED; FEA; 6	MEL; SPR; Ret	MEL; FEA; 4	IMO; SPR; 10	IMO; FEA; 4	MON; SPR; 4	MON; FEA; 7	CAT; SPR; 15	CAT; FEA; 12	RBR; SPR; 15	RBR; FEA; 13	SIL; SPR; 1	SIL; FEA; Ret	HUN; SPR; 14	HUN; FEA; 1	SPA; SPR; 6‡	SPA; FEA; 9	MNZ; SPR; 18	MNZ; FEA; 4	BAK; SPR; 7	BAK; FEA; 3	LSL; SPR; 19†	LSL; FEA; Ret	YMC; SPR; WD	YMC; FEA; WD	6th	113

^{†} Did not finish, but was classified as he had completed more than 90% of the race distance.
^{‡} Reduced points awarded to top-five only as between 25% and 50% of race distance was completed.

=== Complete Formula One results ===
(key) (Races in bold indicate pole position; races in italics indicate fastest lap; ^{superscript} indicates point-scoring sprint position)

Year	Entrant	Chassis	Engine	1	2	3	4	5	6	7	8	9	10	11	12	13	14	15	16	17	18	19	20	21	22	23	24	WDC	Points
2024	Mercedes-AMG Petronas F1 Team	Mercedes-AMG F1 W15	Mercedes-AMG M15 E Performance 1.6 V6 t	BHR	SAU	AUS	JPN	CHN	MIA	EMI	MON	CAN	ESP	AUT	GBR	HUN	BEL	NED	ITA; TD	AZE	SIN	USA	MXC; TD	SAP	LVG	QAT	ABU	—	—
2025	Mercedes-AMG Petronas F1 Team	Mercedes-AMG F1 W16	Mercedes-AMG M16 E Performance 1.6 V6 t	AUS; 4	CHN; 6^{7}	JPN; 6	BHR; 11	SAU; 6	MIA; 6^{7}	EMI; Ret	MON; 18	ESP; Ret	CAN; 3	AUT; Ret	GBR; Ret	BEL; 16	HUN; 10	NED; 16	ITA; 9	AZE; 4	SIN; 5	USA; 13^{8}	MXC; 6	SAP; 2^{2}	LVG; 3	QAT; 5^{6}	ABU; 15	7th	150
2026	Mercedes-AMG Petronas F1 Team	Mercedes-AMG F1 W17	Mercedes-AMG M17 E Performance 1.6 V6 t	AUS; 2	**CHN**; 1^{5}	**JPN**; 1	**MIA**; 1^{6}	CAN; 1^{3}	**MON**; 1	BCN; 16†	AUT; 3	**GBR**; 15^{1}	**BEL**; 1	HUN; 3	NED; 2^{4}	ITA; 1	ESP; 1	AZE; 5	BHR; 2	SIN; 3^{4}	**USA**; 1	MXC; 3	SAP; 5	LVG	QAT	ABU		1st	390*

^{†} Did not finish, but was classified as he had completed more than 90% of the race distance.
* Season still in progress.

==== Formula One records ====
Antonelli holds the following Formula One records:

Record		Achieved	Ref
Youngest driver to lead a lap	18 years, 224 days	2025 Japanese Grand Prix	
Youngest driver to set a fastest lap	18 years, 224 days	2025 Japanese Grand Prix	
Youngest sprint polesitter	18 years, 250 days	2025 Miami Grand Prix	
Youngest driver to score a sprint podium finish	19 years, 75 days	2025 São Paulo Grand Prix	
Most points in rookie season	150	2025	
Youngest polesitter	19 years, 202 days	2026 Chinese Grand Prix	
Youngest driver to win from pole position	19 years, 202 days	2026 Chinese Grand Prix	
Youngest driver to score a hat-trick	19 years, 202 days	2026 Chinese Grand Prix	
Youngest World Drivers' Championship leader	19 years, 216 days	2026 Japanese Grand Prix	
Youngest driver to win consecutive Grands Prix	19 years, 216 days	2026 Japanese Grand Prix	
Youngest driver to set a sprint fastest lap	19 years, 271 days	2026 Canadian Grand Prix	
Youngest driver to score a grand chelem	19 years, 286 days	2026 Monaco Grand Prix	
Most consecutive wins from maiden win	5	2026 Chinese Grand Prix – 2026 Monaco Grand Prix	
Youngest sprint winner	19 years, 313 days	2026 British Grand Prix	
Youngest World Drivers' Champion	20 years, 68 days	2026	
Fewest seasons before first World Drivers' Championship (Note: Excluding drivers who competed in the inaugural 1950 season.)	2 (Note: Record shared with Jacques Villeneuve (1997) and Lewis Hamilton (2008).)	2026	

Footnotes

== Notes ==
Sporting positions
Preceded by Oliver Bearman	Italian F4 Championship; Champion; 2022	Succeeded by Kacper Sztuka
Preceded by Oliver Bearman	ADAC Formula 4 Champion; 2022	Succeeded by Defunct
Preceded by Andrea Rosso	FIA Motorsport Games Formula 4 Cup; Winner; 2022	Succeeded by Juan Cota
Preceded by Established	Formula Regional Middle East Championship; Champion; 2023	Succeeded by Tuukka Taponen
Preceded by Dino Beganovic	Formula Regional European Championship; Champion; 2023	Succeeded by Rafael Câmara
Preceded by Lando Norris	Formula One; World Drivers' Champion; 2026	Succeeded by Incumbent
Awards
Preceded by Gabriele Minì	FIA Karting; Rookie of the Year; 2020	Succeeded by Arvid Lindblad
Preceded by Oscar Piastri	Lorenzo Bandini Trophy; 2026	Succeeded by Incumbent
Records
Preceded by Max Verstappen; 19 years, 44 days (2016 Brazilian Grand Prix)	Youngest driver to set a fastest lap in Formula One; 18 years, 224 days (2025 Japanese Grand Prix)	Succeeded by Incumbent
Preceded by Max Verstappen; 18 years, 228 days (2016 Spanish Grand Prix)	Youngest driver to lead a lap in Formula One; 18 years, 224 days (2025 Japanese Grand Prix)	Succeeded by Incumbent
Preceded by Sebastian Vettel; 21 years, 73 days (2008 Italian Grand Prix)	Youngest polesitter in Formula One; 19 years, 202 days (2026 Chinese Grand Prix)	Succeeded by Incumbent
Preceded by Sebastian Vettel; 23 years, 134 days (2010)	Youngest Formula One; World Drivers' Champion; 20 years, 68 days (2026)	Succeeded by Incumbent
