= List of Formula One driver numbers =

Numbers used by Formula One drivers since 2014

In Formula One, each car is numbered. Since the inaugural Formula One World Championship in 1950, several numbering systems have been used. This list covers the numbers used by drivers since the start of the 2014 Formula One season, when drivers have been allowed to choose a number that they would carry throughout their career.

== History ==
=== 1950–1973 ===
From 1950 to 1973, driver numbers were allocated by the organisers of each event, with no consistent method deployed across events.

=== 1974–1995 ===
In 1974, following a short trial the previous year, a consistent race-to-race numbering system was implemented. The reigning World Champion received number 1, their teammate took number 2, and numbers 3 and 4 and beyond were assigned to teams based on the 1973 Constructors' Championship results. These assigned numbers were supposed to stay with their teams as long as they were part of Formula One or until they ran the reigning World Drivers' Champion, in which case they would swap numbers with the team previously running numbers 1 and 2. In the event of the drivers' champion not returning, no swap took place, and either number 0 (Damon Hill in 1993 and 1994) or number 1 (Ronnie Peterson in 1974 and John Watson in one 1985 race) was exceptionally used.

This system was dropped in 1996. Some traditional numbers of Formula One teams during this period are listed below.

Team	Car number		Years
(United Kingdom) Tyrrell	3	4	1974–1995
(United Kingdom) Williams	27	28	1978–1980
(United Kingdom) Williams	5	6	1982–1995
(United Kingdom) Brabham	7	8	1974–1977, 1985–1992
(United Kingdom) McLaren	7	8	1978–1984, 1993–1995
(United Kingdom) Lotus	5	6	1975–1978
(United Kingdom) Lotus	11	12	1980–1987, 1989–1994
(Italy) Ferrari	11	12	1974–1979
(Italy) Ferrari	27	28	1981–1989, 1991–1995
(France) Renault	15	16	1977–1985
(United Kingdom) Benetton	19	20	1986–1992
(Italy) Scuderia Italia	21	22	1989–1992
(Italy) Alfa Romeo	22	23	1980–1985
(Italy) Minardi	23	24	1986–1994
(France) Ligier	25	26	1976–1995
(United Kingdom) Arrows	17	18	1984–1988
(United Kingdom) Arrows	29	30	1979–1983

=== 1996–2013 ===
After 1995, the numbers would change every year, as the previous season's Constructors' Championship standings would be used to determine the order from numbers 3 and 4 downwards, with the team of the World Drivers' Champion still getting numbers 1 and 2. Throughout this period, number 13 was not used due to its superstitious connotation, with the FIA electing to skip from 11 and 12 to 14 and 15.

=== 2014–present ===
In 2014, it was decided to introduce the current system, where each driver gets to choose a permanent number. Drivers were initially allowed to choose any number from 2 through 99; number 1 is reserved for the World Drivers' Champion. The number 17 was retired in 2015 as a mark of respect to Jules Bianchi, who died that year from injuries sustained in a crash at the 2014 Japanese Grand Prix while carrying the number.

A permanent number can only be reallocated if the driver associated with that number has not participated in a single race over the past two consecutive seasons—a driver picking their number for 2026 can not choose numbers which were last used in 2024 or 2025, unless the number was issued temporarily by the FIA. For instance, Jenson Button's number 22 would have been available for re-allocation in 2019 after his departure from full-time racing in 2016, but an appearance in the 2017 Monaco Grand Prix replacing Fernando Alonso (who was participating in the 2017 Indianapolis 500 instead), meant that his number could not be reassigned until 2020 at the earliest. Yuki Tsunoda subsequently picked that number (22) for 2021.

From 2026, drivers were allowed to request a change in permanent number. Max Verstappen was the first to exploit this rule, switching from 33 to 3.

== Formula One driver numbers ==
=== Permanent numbers ===
The following lists all Formula One driver numbers which were claimed as permanent career numbers since 2014.

No.	Driver	2026 team	First used	Last used
1	Reserved for champion (Note: Lando Norris exercised his right to use number 1 as the reigning World Champion in 2026.)		2014	active
2	(Belgium) Stoffel Vandoorne (Note: Vandoorne used number 47 while substituting for another driver in 2016.)	—N/a	2017	2018
2	(United States) Logan Sargeant	—N/a	2023	2024
3	(Australia) Daniel Ricciardo	—N/a	2014	2024
3	(Netherlands) Max Verstappen	(Austria) Red Bull Racing	2026	active
4	(United Kingdom) Max Chilton	—N/a	2014	2014
4	(United Kingdom) Lando Norris	(United Kingdom) McLaren	2019	2025
5	(Germany) Sebastian Vettel (Note: Sebastian Vettel used number 1 when he was the reigning World Champion in 2014.)	—N/a	2015	2022
5	(Brazil) Gabriel Bortoleto	(Germany) Audi	2025	active
6	(Germany) Nico Rosberg	—N/a	2014	2016
6	(Canada) Nicholas Latifi	—N/a	2020	2022
6	(France) Isack Hadjar	(Austria) Red Bull Racing	2025	active
7	(Finland) Kimi Räikkönen	—N/a	2014	2021
7	(Australia) Jack Doohan (Note: Doohan used number 61 while substituting for another driver in 2024.)	—N/a	2025	2025
8	(France) Romain Grosjean	—N/a	2014	2020
9	(Sweden) Marcus Ericsson	—N/a	2014	2018
9	Nikita Mazepin (Note: Mazepin is Russian, but he competed as a neutral competitor using the designation RAF (Russian Automobile Federation), as the Court of Arbitration for Sport upheld a ban on Russia competing at World Championships. The ban was implemented by the World Anti-Doping Agency in response to state-sponsored doping program of Russian athletes.)	—N/a	2021	2021
10	(Japan) Kamui Kobayashi	—N/a	2014	2014
10	(France) Pierre Gasly	(France) Alpine	2017	active
11	(Mexico) Sergio Pérez	(United States) Cadillac	2014	active
12	(Brazil) Felipe Nasr	—N/a	2015	2016
12	(Italy) Kimi Antonelli	(Germany) Mercedes	2025	active
13	(Venezuela) Pastor Maldonado	—N/a	2014	2015
14	(Spain) Fernando Alonso	(United Kingdom) Aston Martin	2014	active
16	(Monaco) Charles Leclerc	(Italy) Ferrari	2018	active
17	(France) Jules Bianchi	Permanently retired (Note: The number 17 was retired by the FIA following Bianchi's death in 2015.)	2014	2014
18	(Canada) Lance Stroll	(United Kingdom) Aston Martin	2017	active
19	(Brazil) Felipe Massa	—N/a	2014	2017
20	(Denmark) Kevin Magnussen	—N/a	2014	2024
21	(Mexico) Esteban Gutiérrez	—N/a	2014	2016
21	(Netherlands) Nyck de Vries (Note: De Vries used number 45 while substituting for another driver in 2022.)	—N/a	2023	2023
22	(United Kingdom) Jenson Button	—N/a	2014	2017
22	(Japan) Yuki Tsunoda	(Italy) Racing Bulls	2021	2026
23	(Thailand) Alexander Albon	(United Kingdom) Williams	2019	active
24	(China) Zhou Guanyu	—N/a	2022	2024
25	(France) Jean-Éric Vergne	—N/a	2014	2014
26	(Russia) Daniil Kvyat	—N/a	2014	2020
27	(Germany) Nico Hülkenberg	(Germany) Audi	2014	active
28	(United Kingdom) Will Stevens (Note: Stevens used number 46 while substituting for another driver in 2014.)	—N/a	2015	2015
28	(New Zealand) Brendon Hartley (Note: Hartley used number 39 while substituting for another driver in 2017.)	—N/a	2017	2018
30	(United Kingdom) Jolyon Palmer	—N/a	2016	2017
30	(New Zealand) Liam Lawson (Note: Lawson used number 40 while substituting for another driver in 2023.)	(Italy) Racing Bulls	2024	active
31	(France) Esteban Ocon	(United States) Haas	2016	2026
33	(Netherlands) Max Verstappen (Note: Max Verstappen used number 1 when he was the reigning World Champion from 2022 to 2025. He then changed his permanent number to 3 in 2026.)	—N/a	2015	2021
35	(Russia) Sergey Sirotkin	—N/a	2018	2018
41	(United Kingdom) Arvid Lindblad	(Italy) Racing Bulls	2026	active
43	(Argentina) Franco Colapinto	(France) Alpine	2024	active
44	(United Kingdom) Lewis Hamilton	(Italy) Ferrari	2014	active
47	(Germany) Mick Schumacher	—N/a	2021	2022
53	(United States) Alexander Rossi (Note: Rossi used number 42 while substituting for other drivers in 2014.)	—N/a	2015	2015
55	(Spain) Carlos Sainz Jr.	(United Kingdom) Williams	2015	active
63	(United Kingdom) George Russell	(Germany) Mercedes	2019	active
77	(Finland) Valtteri Bottas	(United States) Cadillac	2014	active
81	(Australia) Oscar Piastri	(United Kingdom) McLaren	2023	active
87	(United Kingdom) Oliver Bearman (Note: Oliver Bearman used numbers 38 and 50 while substituting for other drivers in 2024.)	(United States) Haas	2025	active
88	(Indonesia) Rio Haryanto	—N/a	2016	2016
88	(Poland) Robert Kubica	—N/a	2019	2021
89	(United Kingdom) Jack Aitken	—N/a	2020	2020
94	(Germany) Pascal Wehrlein	—N/a	2016	2017
98	(Spain) Roberto Merhi	—N/a	2015	2015
99	(Germany) Adrian Sutil	—N/a	2014	2014
99	(Italy) Antonio Giovinazzi (Note: Giovinazzi used number 36 while substituting for another driver in 2017.)	—N/a	2019	2021

=== Temporary numbers ===
The FIA have also issued temporary numbers to drivers that are exceptions to the career numbers rule; for example, if a driver withdraws from a race and a reserve driver takes their place, they receive a team-allocated number. This is also the case for free-practice–only drivers. Number 42 was entered twice for Alexander Rossi in 2014, but he withdrew from both Grands Prix: the Belgian Grand Prix, where he was supposed to replace Max Chilton before Marussia reinstated Chilton, and the Russian Grand Prix, where he was supposed to replace Jules Bianchi before Marussia chose not to run a second car.

No.	Driver	Team	Grand(s) Prix participated	Source
36	(Italy) Antonio Giovinazzi	(Switzerland) Sauber	2017 Australian Grand Prix; 2017 Chinese Grand Prix	
38	(United Kingdom) Oliver Bearman	(Italy) Ferrari	2024 Saudi Arabian Grand Prix	
39	(New Zealand) Brendon Hartley	(Italy) Toro Rosso	2017 United States Grand Prix	
40	(United Kingdom) Paul di Resta	(United Kingdom) Williams	2017 Hungarian Grand Prix	
40	(New Zealand) Liam Lawson	(Italy) AlphaTauri	2023 Dutch Grand Prix; 2023 Italian Grand Prix; 2023 Singapore Grand Prix; 2023 Japanese Grand Prix; 2023 Qatar Grand Prix	
45	(Germany) André Lotterer	(Malaysia) Caterham	2014 Belgian Grand Prix	
45	(Netherlands) Nyck de Vries	(United Kingdom) Williams	2022 Italian Grand Prix	
46	(United Kingdom) Will Stevens	(Malaysia) Caterham	2014 Abu Dhabi Grand Prix	
47	(Belgium) Stoffel Vandoorne	(United Kingdom) McLaren	2016 Bahrain Grand Prix	
50	(United Kingdom) Oliver Bearman	(United States) Haas	2024 Azerbaijan Grand Prix; 2024 São Paulo Grand Prix	
50	(Japan) Ryo Hirakawa	(United States) Haas	2026 Mexico City Grand Prix	
51	(Brazil) Pietro Fittipaldi	(United States) Haas	2020 Sakhir Grand Prix; 2020 Abu Dhabi Grand Prix	
51	(Brazil) Rafael Câmara	(United States) Haas	2026 São Paulo Grand Prix	
61	(Australia) Jack Doohan	(France) Alpine	2024 Abu Dhabi Grand Prix	

=== Number 1 ===
The number 1 is reserved for the previous season's World Drivers' Champion, although it is not mandatory for the driver to run the number. The first driver to exercise the right to run the number 1 under the new regulations was Sebastian Vettel in 2014. The number then went unused for seven seasons, with Lewis Hamilton keeping his permanent number 44 after his title wins in 2014–2015 and 2017–2020, and Nico Rosberg retiring after his championship win in 2016. Despite Hamilton not using it full-time, he received permission to display the number 1 on the nose of his car during Friday practice at the 2018 and 2019 Abu Dhabi Grand Prix. However, his car was officially entered under his usual number 44, which remained visible on the engine cover. Max Verstappen used number 1 from 2022 to 2025, following his titles in 2021, 2022, 2023 and 2024. Lando Norris is currently using number 1 in 2026, following his title win in 2025. The number will once again go unused in 2027, with Kimi Antonelli opting to keep his permanent number 12 after his title win in 2026.

Driver	Team	First used	Last used
(Germany) Sebastian Vettel	(Austria) Red Bull Racing	2014	2014
(Netherlands) Max Verstappen	(Austria) Red Bull Racing	2022	2025
(United Kingdom) Lando Norris	(United Kingdom) McLaren	2026	Active
