= 2027 Formula One World Championship =

Scheduled Formula One season

Kimi Antonelli (left) and his team, Mercedes (right), will enter the year as the defending World Drivers' and Constructors' Champions, respectively.

The 2027 FIA Formula One World Championship is a planned motor racing championship for Formula One cars which will be the 78th running of the Formula One World Championship. It is recognised by the Fédération Internationale de l'Automobile (FIA), the governing body of international motorsport, as the highest class of competition for open-wheel racing cars. The championship is scheduled to be contested over twenty-four Grands Prix held around the world. Drivers and teams will compete for the titles of World Drivers' Champion and World Constructors' Champion, respectively. Kimi Antonelli and his team Mercedes are set to be the reigning World Drivers' and Constructors' Champions, respectively.

== Entries ==
The following constructors and drivers are under contract to compete in the 2027 World Championship. All teams are due to compete with tyres supplied by Pirelli. Each team is required to enter at least two drivers, one for each of the two mandatory cars.

Teams and drivers that are contracted to compete in the 2027 World Championship
Entrant	Constructor	Chassis	Power unit	Race drivers	
Entrant	Constructor	Chassis	Power unit	No.	Driver name
(France) Gucci Racing Alpine F1 Team	Alpine-Mercedes	TBA	Mercedes	10	(France) Pierre Gasly
(France) Gucci Racing Alpine F1 Team	Alpine-Mercedes	TBA	Mercedes	43	(Argentina) Franco Colapinto
(United Kingdom) Aston Martin Aramco F1 Team	Aston Martin Aramco-Honda	AMR27	Honda	14	(Spain) Fernando Alonso
(United Kingdom) Aston Martin Aramco F1 Team	Aston Martin Aramco-Honda	AMR27	Honda	18	(Canada) Lance Stroll
(United Kingdom) Atlassian Williams F1 Team	Atlassian Williams-Mercedes	FW50	Mercedes	23	(Thailand) Alexander Albon
(United Kingdom) Atlassian Williams F1 Team	Atlassian Williams-Mercedes	FW50	Mercedes	55	(Spain) Carlos Sainz Jr.
(Germany) Audi Revolut F1 Team	Audi	TBA	Audi	5	Gabriel Bortoleto
(Germany) Audi Revolut F1 Team	Audi	TBA	Audi	27	(Germany) Nico Hülkenberg
(United States) Cadillac Formula 1 Team	Cadillac-Ferrari	TBA	Ferrari	11	(Mexico) Sergio Pérez
(United States) Cadillac Formula 1 Team	Cadillac-Ferrari	TBA	Ferrari	77	(Finland) Valtteri Bottas
(Italy) Scuderia Ferrari HP	Ferrari	TBA	Ferrari	16	(Monaco) Charles Leclerc
(Italy) Scuderia Ferrari HP	Ferrari	TBA	Ferrari	44	(United Kingdom) Lewis Hamilton
(United States) TGR Haas F1 Team	Haas-Ferrari	TBA	Ferrari	50	Rafael Câmara
(United States) TGR Haas F1 Team	Haas-Ferrari	TBA	Ferrari	TBC	TBA
(United Kingdom) McLaren Mastercard F1 Team	McLaren-Mercedes	MCL41	Mercedes	4	(United Kingdom) Lando Norris
(United Kingdom) McLaren Mastercard F1 Team	McLaren-Mercedes	MCL41	Mercedes	81	(Australia) Oscar Piastri
(Germany) Mercedes-AMG Petronas F1 Team	Mercedes	TBA	Mercedes	12	(Italy) Kimi Antonelli
(Germany) Mercedes-AMG Petronas F1 Team	Mercedes	TBA	Mercedes	63	(United Kingdom) George Russell
(Italy) Visa Cash App Racing Bulls F1 Team	Racing Bulls-Red Bull Ford	TBA	Red Bull Ford	30	(New Zealand) Liam Lawson
(Italy) Visa Cash App Racing Bulls F1 Team	Racing Bulls-Red Bull Ford	TBA	Red Bull Ford	41	(United Kingdom) Arvid Lindblad
(Austria) Oracle Red Bull Racing	Red Bull Racing-Red Bull Ford	TBA	Red Bull Ford	3	(Netherlands) Max Verstappen
(Austria) Oracle Red Bull Racing	Red Bull Racing-Red Bull Ford	TBA	Red Bull Ford	6	(France) Isack Hadjar

=== Driver changes ===
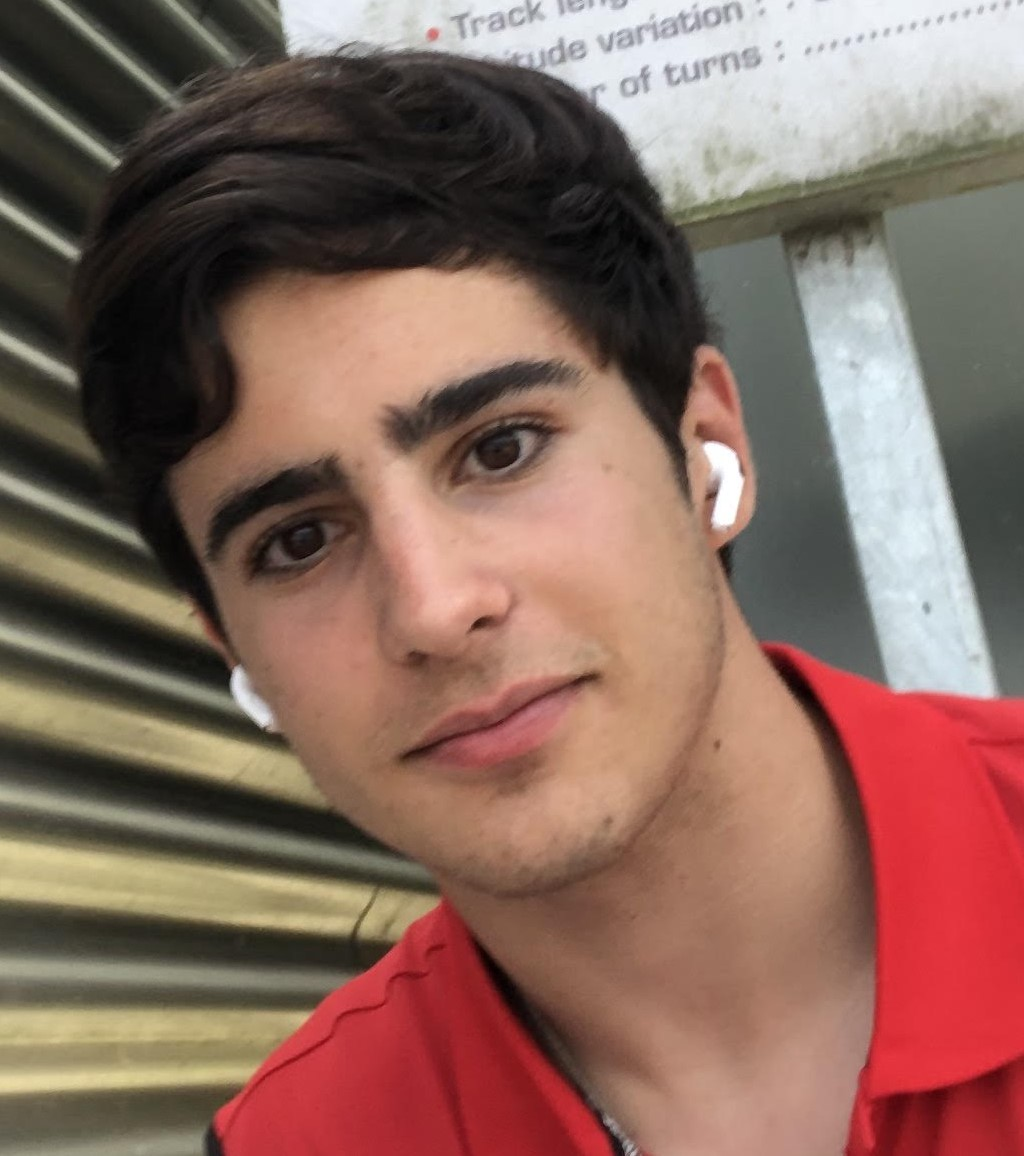
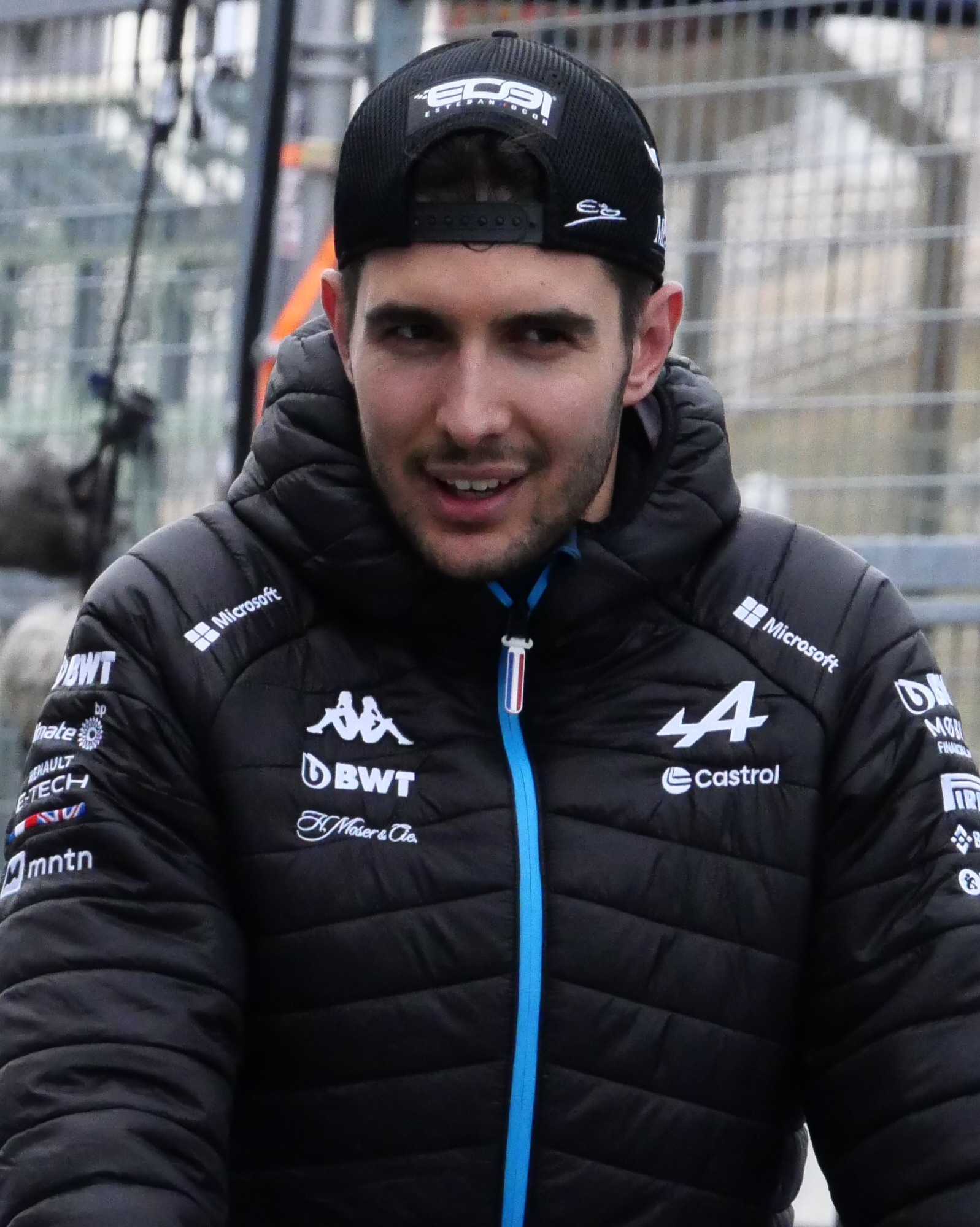
Rafael Câmara (left) will replace Esteban Ocon (right) at Haas full-time, having already filled in for him at the final four rounds of the 2026 season.

Esteban Ocon was expected to depart Haas at the end of 2026 after two seasons but was released following the 2026 Mexico City Grand Prix due to a disagreement with the team. He will be replaced by Rafael Câmara, graduating from Formula 2, who made his Formula One debut early with Haas at the 2026 São Paulo Grand Prix.

== Calendar ==
Nations that are scheduled to host a Grand Prix in 2027 are highlighted in green, with circuit locations marked with a black dot. Former host nations are shown in dark grey, and former host circuits are marked with a white dot. De facto borders are shown.

The 2027 calendar is scheduled to comprise twenty-four Grands Prix. The Bahrain, Australian, Japanese, Canadian, Monaco, British, Italian, São Paulo, Qatar, and Abu Dhabi Grands Prix will feature the sprint format.

Round	Grand Prix	Circuit	Race date
1	Bahrain Grand Prix	Bahrain International Circuit, Sakhir	14 March
2	Saudi Arabian Grand Prix	(Saudi Arabia) Jeddah Corniche Circuit, Jeddah	21 March
3	Australian Grand Prix	(Australia) Albert Park Circuit, Melbourne	4 April
4	Japanese Grand Prix	(Japan) Suzuka Circuit, Suzuka	11 April
5	Chinese Grand Prix	(China) Shanghai International Circuit, Shanghai	18 April
6	Miami Grand Prix	(United States) Miami International Autodrome, Miami Gardens, Florida	2 May
7	Canadian Grand Prix	(Canada) Circuit Gilles Villeneuve, Montreal	23 May
8	Monaco Grand Prix	Circuit de Monaco, Monaco	6 June
9	Portuguese Grand Prix	(Portugal) Algarve International Circuit, Portimão	20 June
10	British Grand Prix	(United Kingdom) Silverstone Circuit, Silverstone	4 July
11	Austrian Grand Prix	(Austria) Red Bull Ring, Spielberg	11 July
12	Belgian Grand Prix	(Belgium) Circuit de Spa-Francorchamps, Stavelot	25 July
13	Hungarian Grand Prix	(Hungary) Hungaroring, Mogyoród	1 August
14	Italian Grand Prix	(Italy) Monza Circuit, Monza	5 September
15	Spanish Grand Prix	(Spain) Madring, Madrid	12 September
16	Azerbaijan Grand Prix	(Azerbaijan) Baku City Circuit, Baku	26 September
17	Turkish Grand Prix	(Turkey) Istanbul Park, Istanbul	3 October
18	Singapore Grand Prix	Marina Bay Street Circuit, Singapore	10 October
19	United States Grand Prix	(United States) Circuit of the Americas, Austin, Texas	24 October
20	Mexico City Grand Prix	Autódromo Hermanos Rodríguez, Mexico City	31 October
21	São Paulo Grand Prix	(Brazil) Interlagos Circuit, São Paulo	7 November
22	Las Vegas Grand Prix	(United States) Las Vegas Strip Circuit, Paradise, Nevada	20 November (Note: Saturday race.)
23	Qatar Grand Prix	(Qatar) Lusail International Circuit, Lusail	5 December
24	Abu Dhabi Grand Prix	(United Arab Emirates) Yas Marina Circuit, Abu Dhabi	12 December

=== Calendar changes ===
The Dutch Grand Prix will not be held in 2027, as the organisers announced that the 2026 edition would be the final running of the Grand Prix. The Portuguese and Turkish Grands Prix will return to the calendar for the first time since 2021. The Barcelona-Catalunya Grand Prix will be absent from the 2027 calendar and will be held in 2028, 2030 and 2032 as part of a rotation agreement with the Belgian Grand Prix, which will be held in 2027, 2029 and 2031. The Bahrain Grand Prix will return to the Bahrain International Circuit after its 2026 edition was relocated to the Sepang International Circuit in Malaysia due to the 2026 Iran war, while the Saudi Arabian Grand Prix is scheduled to return after its 2026 edition was cancelled.

== Regulation changes ==
=== Technical regulations ===
The engine regulations introduced in 2026 will be amended to increase internal combustion engine power from 400kW to 420kW while reducing maximum electrical power deployment in the MGU-K from 350kW to 300kW. This changes the ratio of power from 53:47 to 58:42, before changing to 60:40 in 2028. As a result, fuel flow will increase 5%, which in turn has required overall race distance to be shortened from 305 km (190 mi) to 290 km (180 mi) to allow teams to continue to use elements of their 2026 chassis designs which includes the fuel tank. Harvesting will be increased from 350kW to 375kW. Together, these regulation changes are intended to reduce electrical energy exhaustion and decrease the need for lift-and-coast or 'super clipping' on long straights.

In addition to engine changes, gearbox homologation will also be scrapped starting in 2027, allowing teams to alter their design in-season as they see fit.

=== Sporting regulations ===
Due to changes to the fuel flow regulations for 2027, all races except for the Monaco Grand Prix will have a distance of 290 km (180 mi) instead of 305 km (190 mi). This change will be implemented for the 2027 season only; from 2028 the distance will revert back to 305 km.

The FIA will gain more flexibility in extending free practice sessions in case of interruptions. Additionally, the three hour clock which was used to determine the length of a race when including stoppages has been scrapped and will be replaced by a hard stop time for racing activity. The two hour race limit will remain the same.

== Season summary ==
The second F1 Live event following F1 75 Live in 2025 will be held on 18 February 2027 in Milan, Italy. A single pre-season test is scheduled to be held at the Bahrain International Circuit in Sakhir on 24–27 February.
