= Rafael Câmara =

Brazilian racing driver (born 2005)

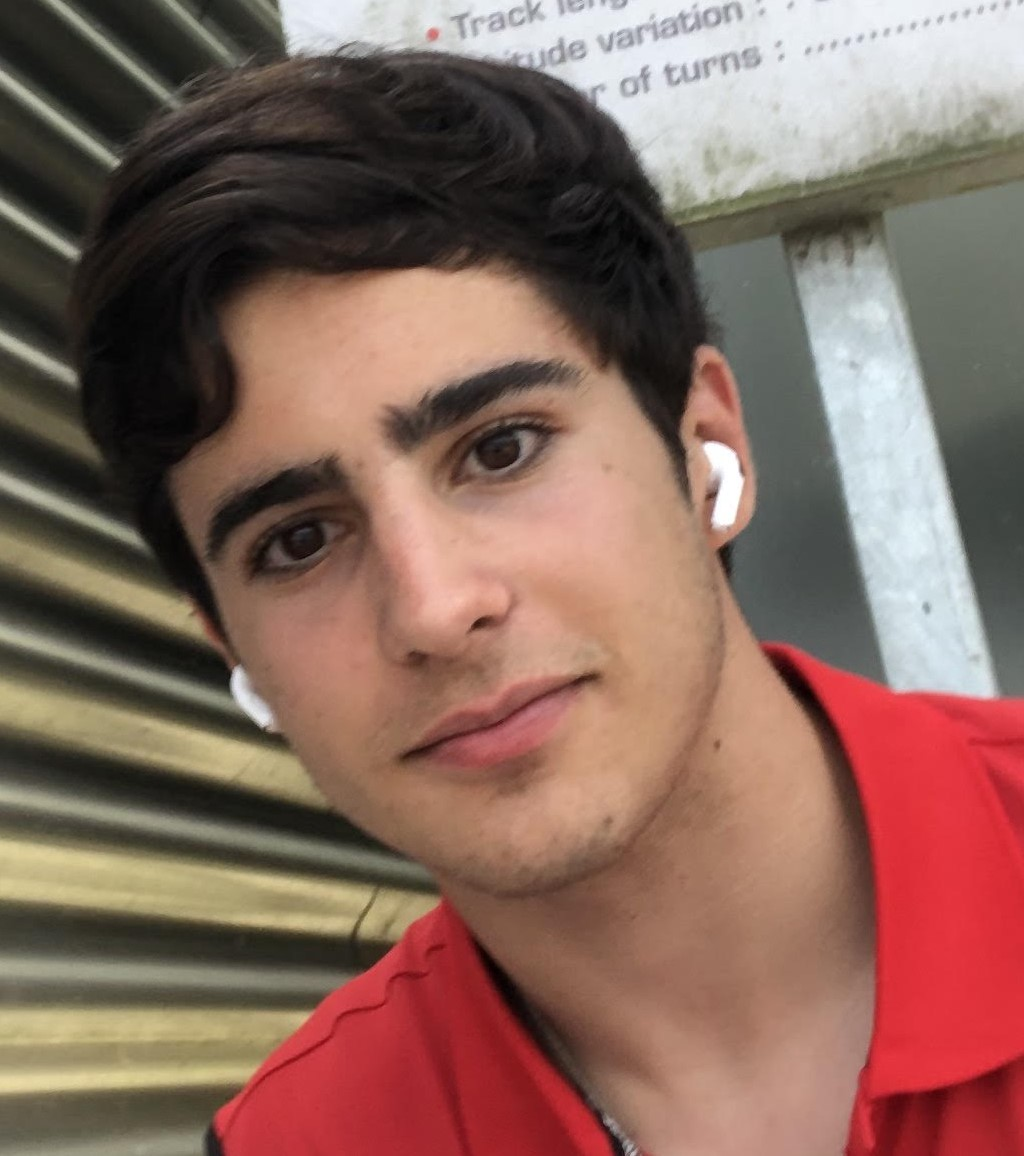
- Câmara in 2022
- Born: Rafael Chaves Câmara; 5 May 2005 (age 21); Recife, Pernambuco, Brazil

Formula One World Championship career
- Nationality: (Brazil) Brazilian
- 2026 team: Haas-Ferrari
- Car number: 50 (Note: Câmara selected the number 50 as his personal driver number, per FIA regulations; in 2026, he competed using the standard reserve number 51 for Haas.)
- Entries: 2 (2 starts)
- Championships: 0
- Wins: 0
- Podiums: 0
- Career points: 0
- Pole positions: 0
- Fastest laps: 0
- First entry: 2026 São Paulo Grand Prix
- Last entry: 2026 Las Vegas Grand Prix

Previous series
- 2026; 2025; 2023–2024; 2023–2024; 2022; 2022; 2022: FIA Formula 2; FIA Formula 3; FR European; FR Middle East; Italian F4; ADAC F4; F4 UAE

Championship titles
- 2025; 2024: FIA Formula 3; FR European

Awards
- 2025: FIA Rookie of the Year

Rafael "Rafa" Chaves Câmara (Brazilian Portuguese: [ʁafaˈɛw ˈkɐ̃mɐɾɐ]; born 5 May 2005) is a Brazilian racing driver who competes in Formula One for Haas.

Born and raised in Pernambuco, Câmara began competitive kart racing aged six, winning three international titles before graduating to junior formulae in 2022. He debuted in Formula 4 with Prema, finishing runner-up to Charlie Wurz in the UAE Championship and third in both the Italian and ADAC Championships. He progressed to Formula Regional in 2023, where he claimed third in the Middle East and multiple victories in the European Championship, which he won the following season with Prema. Upon his graduation to FIA Formula 3, he won the championship in his rookie season with Trident. He led the standings in FIA Formula 2 with Invicta at the time of his promotion to Formula One.

A member of the Ferrari Driver Academy since 2022, Câmara joined Haas for the final four Grands Prix of 2026—debuting in São Paulo—prior to his full-time promotion in 2027. Câmara is contracted to remain at Haas until at least the end of the 2028 season.

== Early life and family background ==
Rafael Chaves Câmara was born on 5 May 2005 in Boa Viagem, Recife, Pernambuco, Brazil. His father, Amaro Câmara, is a lawyer while his mother, Paula Chaves, is a businesswoman. His maternal grandmother, Niége Rossiter, was a pioneer in Recife motorsports during the 1960s.

== Junior racing career ==
=== Karting (2011–2021) ===
Câmara began karting in 2011, where he competed in the Pernambuco's State Championship. He would soon move into international competitions, after winning titles in all national and regional championships that he participated, garnering particular success in 2019 by finishing second in the Karting World Championship, driving in the OK Junior class for Forza Racing. Having finished fifth in the European Championship during his first year of senior karting, Câmara would close his karting career in 2021 by winning a number of series, such as the WSK Champions Cup and WSK Super Master Series, as well as taking vice-champion status in the European Championship.

=== Formula 4 (2022) ===
==== F4 UAE ====
In 2022, Câmara made his single-seater debut, competing in the F4 UAE Championship with Prema Racing to prepare for his main campaigns in Europe. Having missed the opening round due to contracting COVID-19, Câmara scored his first podium at round two in Dubai, before achieving his first pair of car racing victories at the same venue the following weekend. The penultimate event of the campaign brought even more success, as Câmara won three of the four races, putting himself in title contention before the season finale. Despite winning Race 1 at Yas Marina, a collision in the third race forced his retirement from the race and clinched the title for teammate Charlie Wurz. Câmara ended up second in the standings and first in the rookie championship with 6 wins.

==== ADAC F4 ====
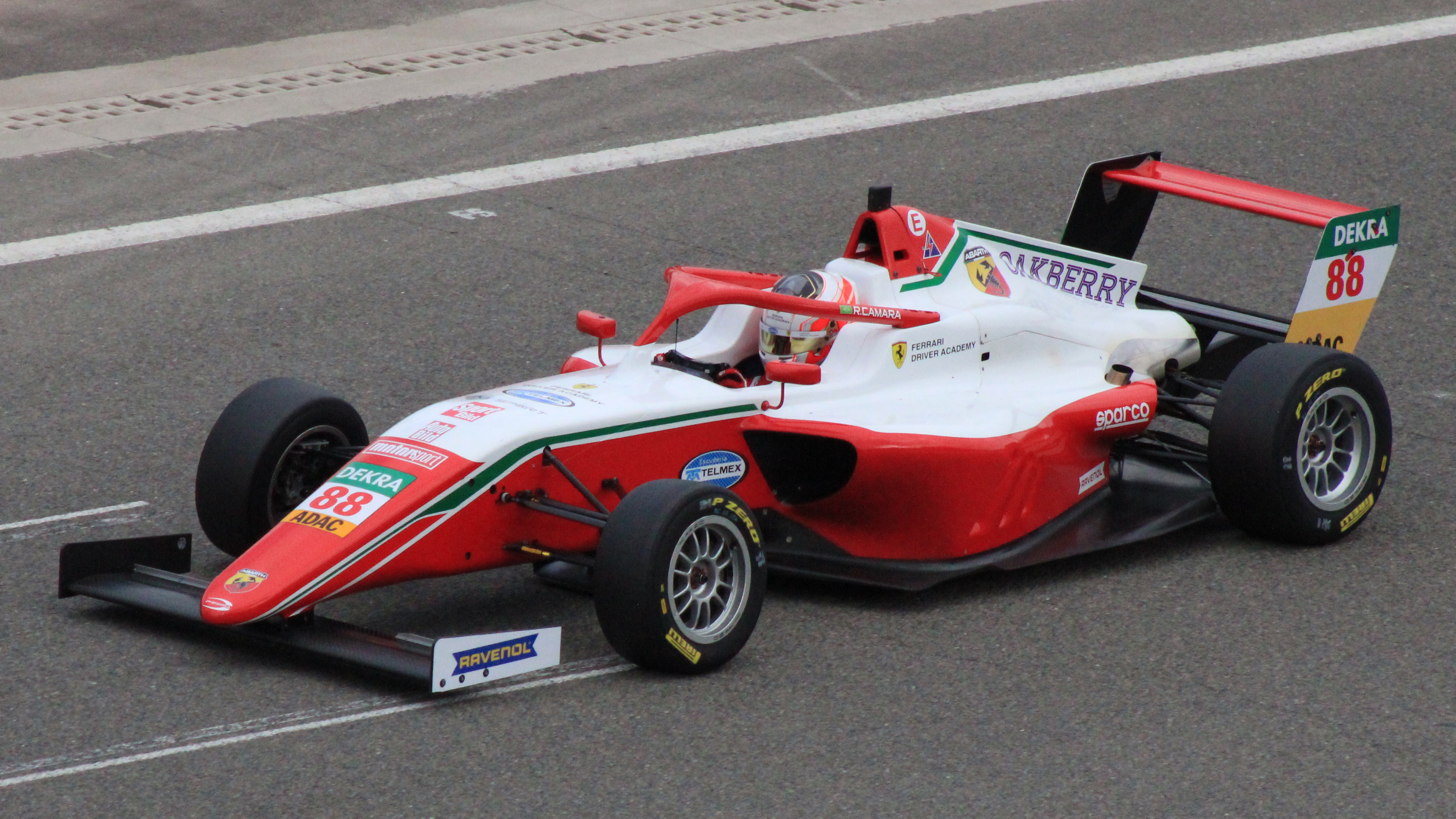
Câmara (pictured at Spa) won the ADAC F4 rookie title with Prema Racing.

Remaining with Prema, Câmara competed in ADAC F4, partnering Wurz, Andrea Kimi Antonelli, Conrad Laursen and fellow FDA member James Wharton. The season started out strongly, as two-second places and a victory in Race 3 at Spa-Francorchamps gave Câmara the championship lead. Victory eluded him in the next two rounds, although he was able to cement his place as the closest challenger to title favourite Antonelli, with a pair of podiums at Hockenheim and Zandvoort respectively. His championship challenge was thwarted before the next round at the Nürburgring however, as another contraction of COVID-19 forced Câmara to miss the event. He finished off his campaign with two pole positions and podiums at the second Nürburgring round, which earned Câmara the rookie title and third overall in the standings.

==== Italian F4 ====
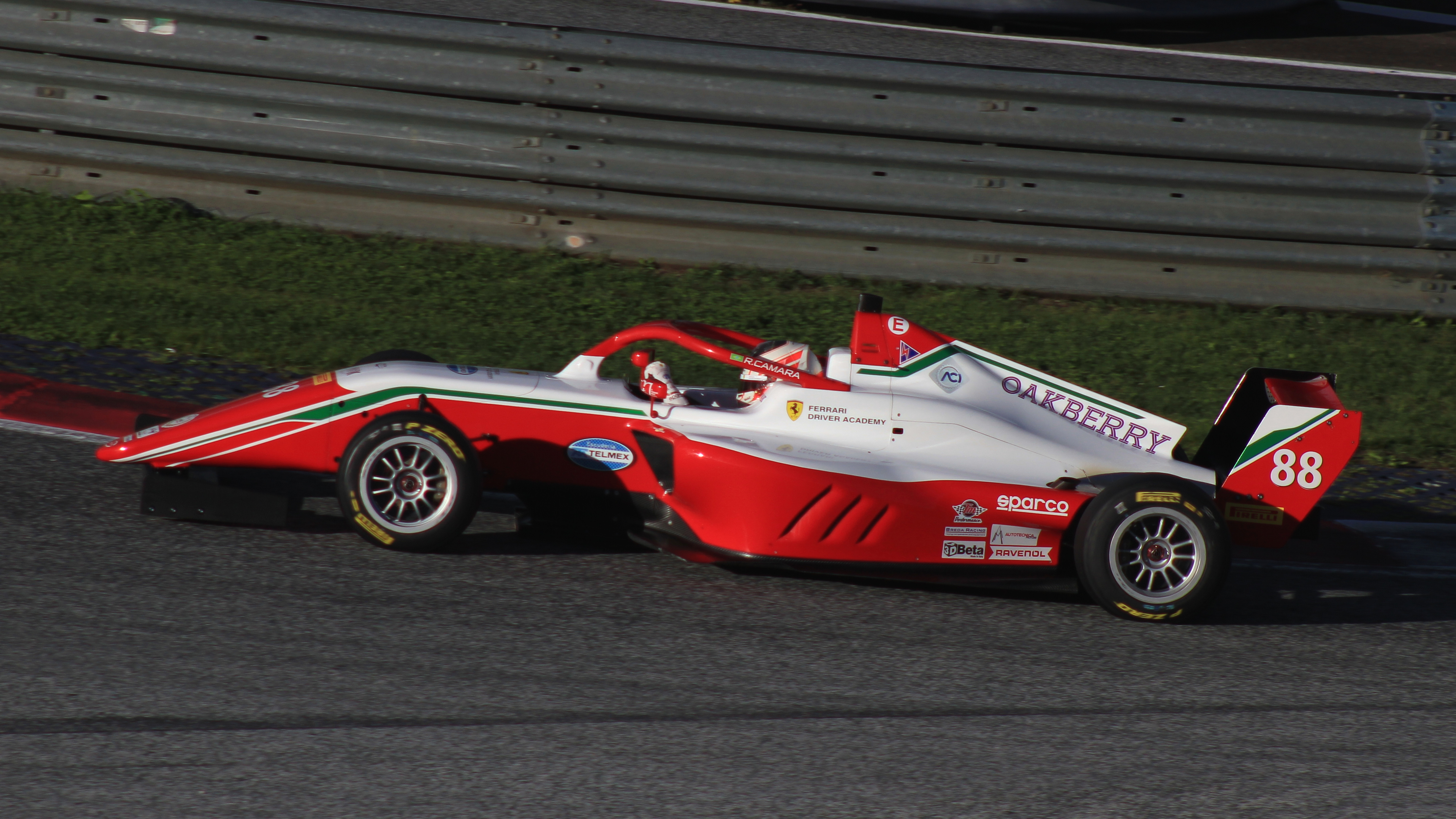
Câmara racing in the 2022 Italian F4 Championship at the Red Bull Ring.

In tandem with his ADAC F4 campaign, Câmara also competed in Italian F4 with Prema Racing. He experienced a competitive start to his campaign, inheriting victory at the season opener in Imola when race leader Antonelli experienced a gearbox failure in the closing laps. Another victory followed at Misano, where the Brazilian proved his opportunism by overtaking his Italian teammate at the safety car restart, which was then followed by another impressive weekend at Spa, where, having stalled from pole position in Race 3, Câmara recovered to third by the checkered flag. More podiums came at Vallelunga and the Red Bull Ring, before Câmara experienced his first and only podium-lacking event of the year at Monza. He finished his season third in the championship, falling behind Alex Dunne at the final round after a collision with the Irishman at the first corner.

=== Formula Regional (2023–2024) ===
==== 2023: Maiden victories ====
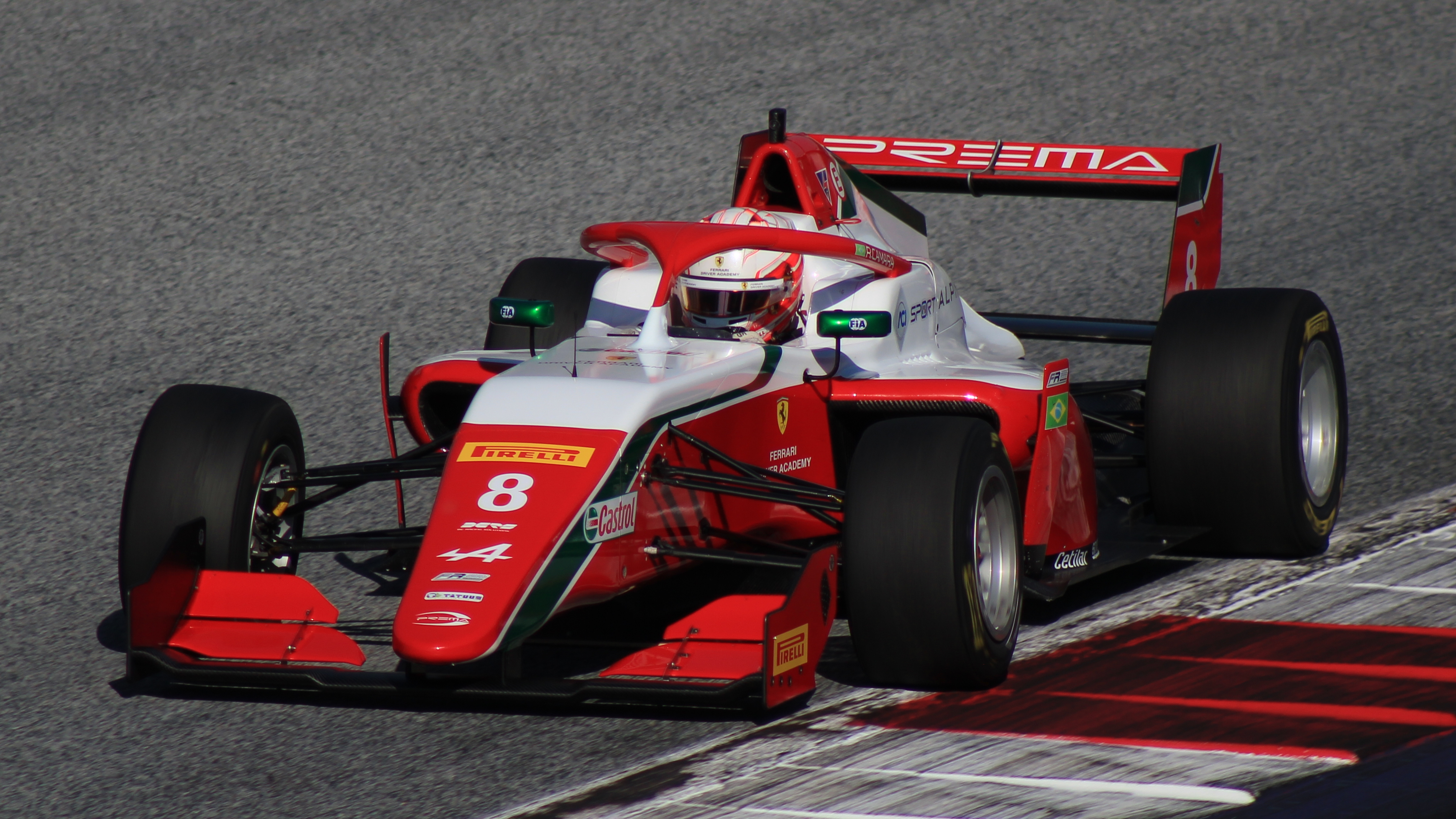
Câmara racing in the 2023 Formula Regional European Championship at the Red Bull Ring.

During pre-season, Câmara did a full season in the 2023 Formula Regional Middle East Championship with Mumbai Falcons. Despite not winning a race, Câmara claimed six podiums that took him to third in the standings.

Having tested with the team at the end of 2022, Câmara progressed to the Formula Regional European Championship with Prema Racing the following year, driving alongside F4 teammate Antonelli and category veteran Lorenzo Fluxá. He took his maiden win in the series during the first race at Spa-Francorchamps. With a second win at Red Bull Ring and three additional podiums, Câmara finished fifth in the standings.

==== 2024: Record-breaking first junior championship ====
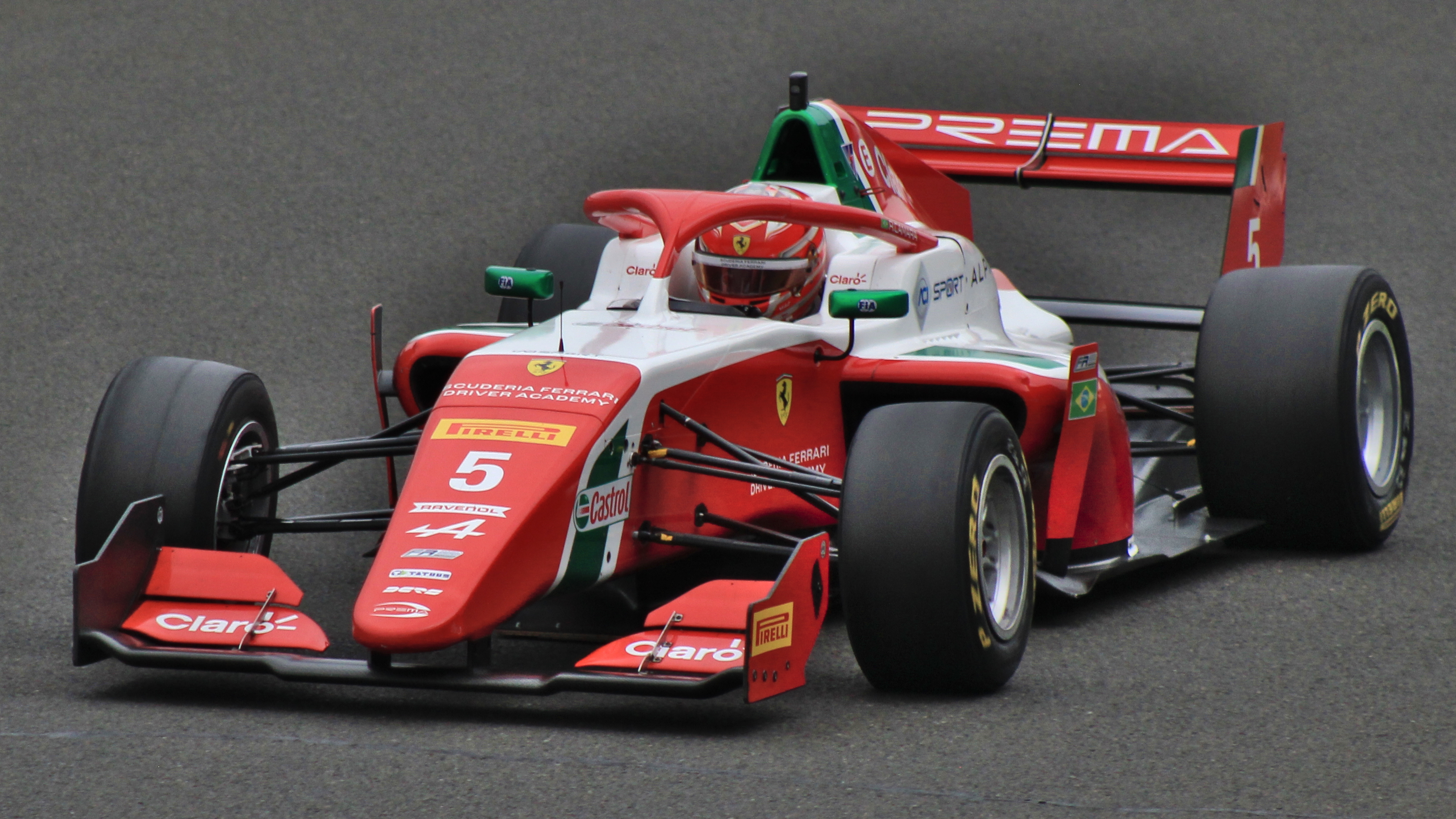
Câmara (pictured at the Hungaroring) claimed the 2024 Formula Regional European Championship title, earning a record-breaking 7 wins.

Câmara remained with Prema Racing for the 2024 FRECA season. He began the season with a fairly large lead, equalling his podiums from the previous season and claiming four wins in the first three rounds. Though going winless for the next two rounds, he cemented himself as a championship favourite with a win from pole at the first race at Paul Ricard and a lead of 50 points from second place, fellow Ferrari junior Tuukka Taponen. After the summer break, Câmara won another race at Imola before a pointless weekend at the Red Bull Ring. Despite the slight setback, he clinched the title in Barcelona with one round remaining after a podium and a fourth place. One final win at Monza resulted in a total of seven wins, the most wins in a single FRECA season. He scored points in every round except for one, never qualified outside the top-four and had a 75-point lead over second place, James Wharton.

Additionally, Câmara competed in the 2024 FRME season, remaining with Mumbai Falcons. He finished third in the championship with two wins.

=== FIA Formula 3 (2025) ===
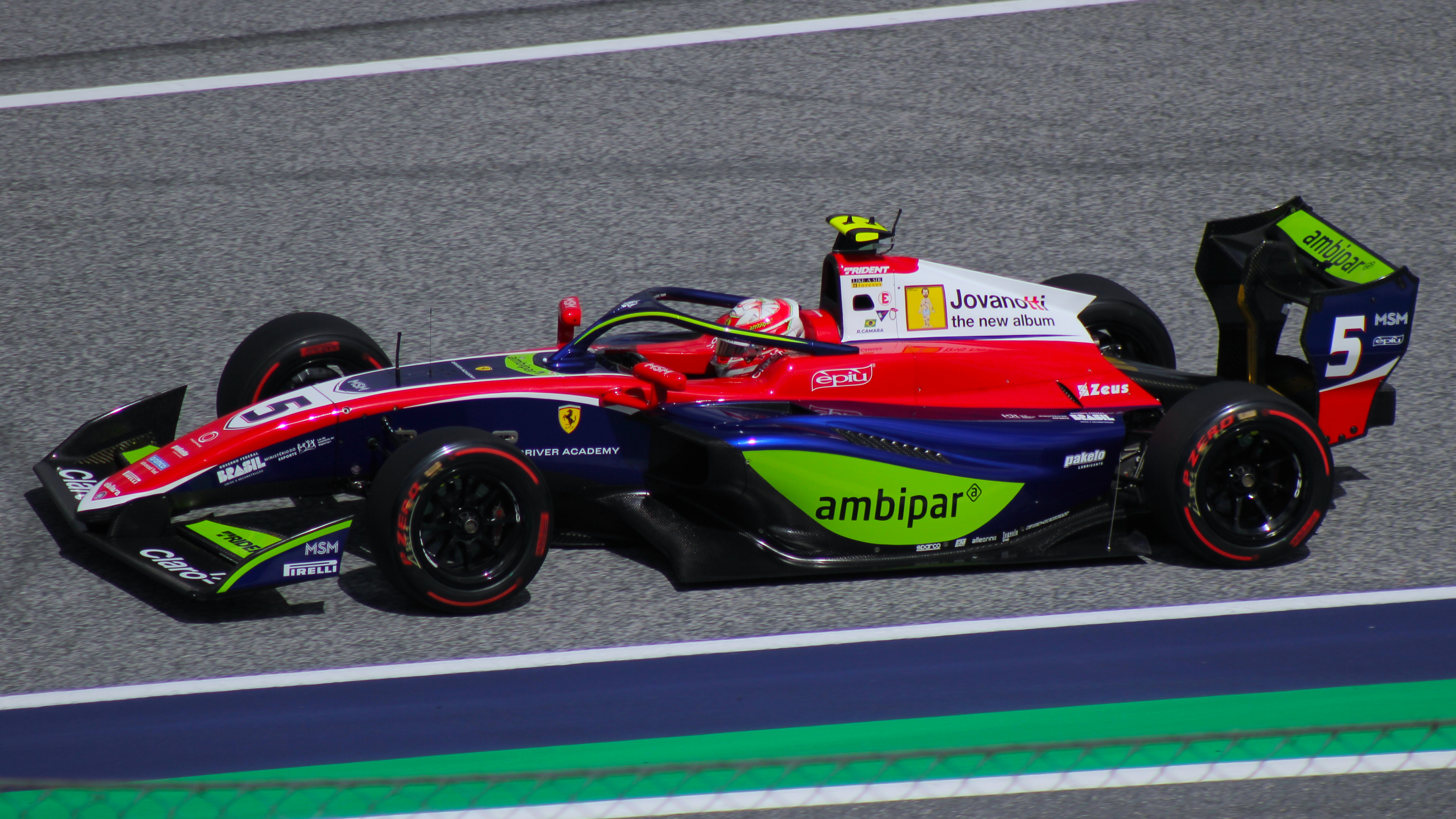
Câmara (pictured at the Spielberg round) was the first driver to clinch the driver's championship prior to the final round.

Câmara was promoted to Formula 3 in 2025 with Trident, alongside Charlie Wurz and FRECA rival Noah Strømsted. He qualified on pole and won the feature races in both Melbourne and Bahrain. In Imola, he took his third consecutive pole position, the first driver to do so since Logan Sargeant in 2020. However, his feature race win streak came to an end, and he had to settle for third behind Santiago Ramos and teammate Strømsted. He claimed his fourth pole position in Barcelona, the first driver to accomplish this feat in the series and converted it successfully to his third feature race win having led every lap.

Câmara clinched the championship at the penultimate round after finishing first in the feature race at the Hungaroring. He was the first driver to do so since the inception of the championship in 2019.

=== FIA Formula 2 (2026) ===
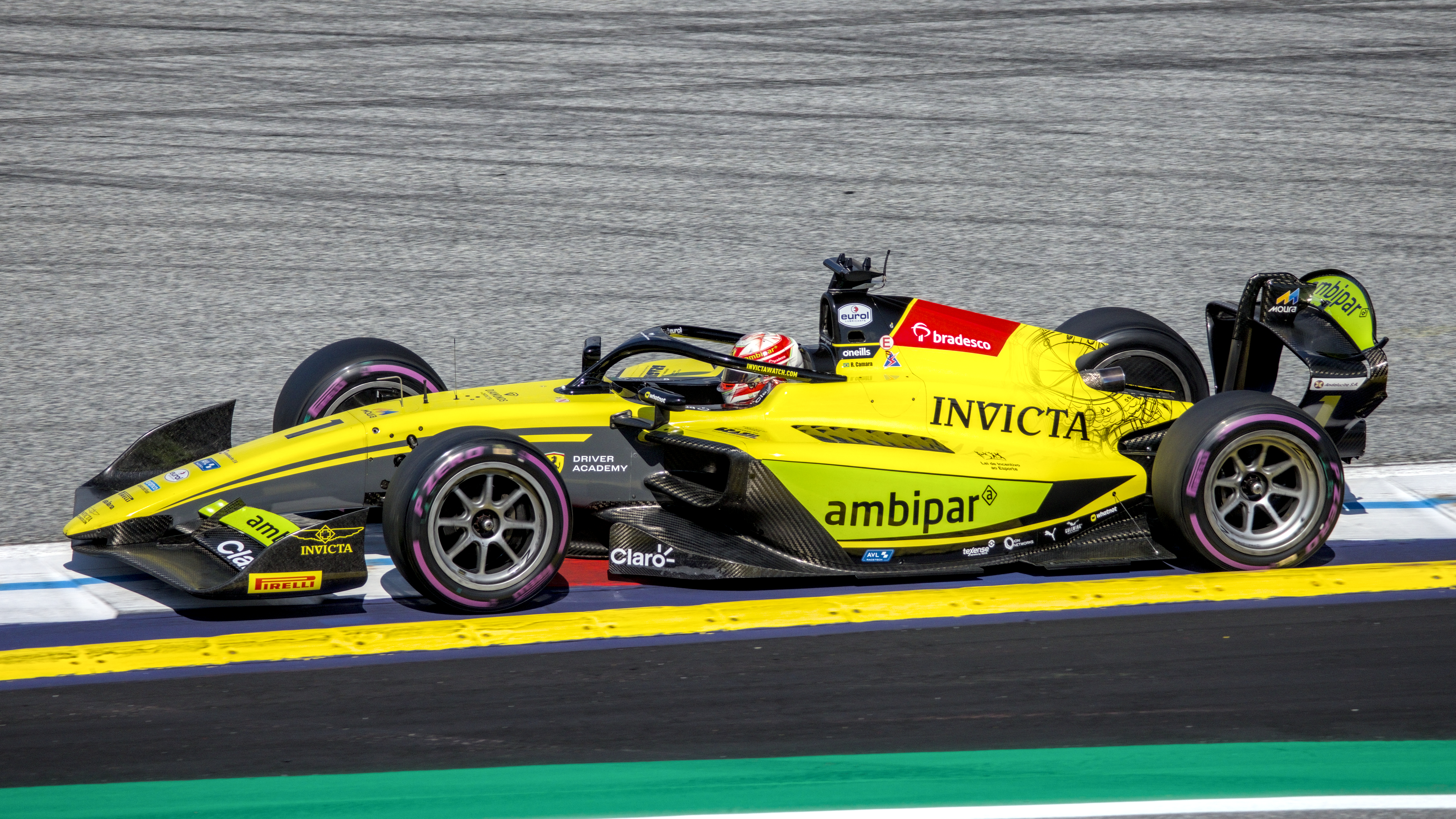
Câmara driving the Dallara F2 2024 during the 2026 Spielberg Formula 2 round

Having won the 2025 Formula 3 title, Câmara stepped up to Formula 2 in 2026 with Invicta Racing, partnering Joshua Dürksen.

== Formula One career ==
Câmara joined the Ferrari Driver Academy in 2022 alongside Oliver Bearman after competing in the FDA World Scouting Finals. As of September 2026, Câmara has driven multiple Formula One cars, including the Ferrari SF-25 and Haas VF-25.

=== Haas (2026–present) ===
==== 2026: Mid-season debut ====
In October 2026, Câmara was announced as a Haas driver after signing a multi-year contract with the team from 2027, replacing Esteban Ocon. He was selected ahead of Jack Doohan, Leonardo Fornaroli, and Ryo Hirakawa following trials at Portimão in August. In November, it was announced that Câmara would make his F1 race debut at the São Paulo Grand Prix after it was announced that Esteban Ocon was released by Haas team after a last minute demotion during the Mexico City Grand Prix, where Hirakawa replaced Ocon for the latter parts of the race weekend.

==== 2027: Rookie season ====
Câmara is set to remain at Haas for his full rookie season in 2027.

== Karting record ==
=== Karting career summary ===
Season	Series	Team	Position
2014	Florida Winter Tour — Micro Max		14th
2014	Copa Brasil — Cadete		15th
2015	Florida Winter Tour — Micro Max		7th
2016	WSK Super Master Series — 60 Mini	Energy Corse	47th
2016	RMC Grand Finals — Mini Max		14th
2017	WSK Champions Cup — 60 Mini	Birel ART Racing	NC
2017	WSK Super Master Series — 60 Mini	Birel ART Racing	5th
2017	WSK Final Cup — OK-J	Kosmic Racing Department	32nd
2017	RMC Grand Finals — Junior Max		NC
2018	WSK Champions Cup — OK-J	Kosmic Racing Department	33rd
2018	South Garda Winter Cup — OK-J	Kosmic Racing Department	34th
2018	WSK Super Master Series — OK-J	Kosmic Racing Department	37th
2018	WSK Open Cup — OK-J	Kosmic Racing Department	4th
2018	CIK-FIA European Championship — OK-J	Kosmic Racing Department	15th
2018	CIK-FIA World Championship — OK-J	Kosmic Racing Department	42nd
2018	WSK Final Cup — OK-J	Birel ART Racing	11th
2019	WSK Champions Cup — OK-J	Birel ART Racing	NC
2019	South Garda Winter Cup — OK-J	Birel ART Racing	83rd
2019	WSK Super Master Series — OK-J	Birel ART Racing	10th
2019	WSK Euro Series — OK-J	Baby Race Driver Academy	16th
2019	Coupe de France — OK-J		19th
2019	CIK-FIA European Championship — OK-J	Birel ART Racing	24th
2019	CIK-FIA World Championship — OK-J	Forza Racing	2nd
2019	WSK Open Cup — OK	Forza Racing	53rd
2019	WSK Final Cup — OK	Forza Racing	14th
2020	WSK Champions Cup — OK	Forza Racing	11th
2020	South Garda Winter Cup — OK	Forza Racing	15th
2020	WSK Super Master Series — OK	Forza Racing	8th
2020	CIK-FIA European Championship — OK	Forza Racing	5th
2020	WSK Euro Series — OK	Forza Racing	8th
2020	Champions of the Future — OK	Forza Racing	3rd
2020	CIK-FIA World Championship — OK	Forza Racing	25th
2021	WSK Champions Cup — OK	KR Motorsport	1st
2021	WSK Euro Series — OK	KR Motorsport	18th
2021	WSK Super Master Series — OK	KR Motorsport	1st
2021	CIK-FIA European Championship — OK	KR Motorsport	2nd
2021	Champions of the Future — OK	KR Motorsport	1st
2021	CIK-FIA World Championship — OK	KR Motorsport	35th

=== Complete CIK-FIA Karting European Championship results ===
(key) (Races in bold indicate pole position) (Races in italics indicate fastest lap)

Year	Team	Class	1	2	3	4	5	6	7	8	DC	Points
2018	Kosmic Racing Departement	OK-J	SAR; QH; 24	SAR; R 23	PFI; QH; 7	PFI; R 5	AMP; QH; 13	AMP; R 17	LEM; QH; 15	LEM; R 15	14th	16
2019	Birel ART Racing	OK-J	ANG; QH; 33	ANG; R 15	GEN; QH; 15	GEN; R 15	KRI; QH; 11	KRI; R 30	LEM; QH; 9	LEM; R 10	24th	10
2020	Forza Racing	OK	ZUE; QH; 34	ZUE; R (10)	SAR; QH; 15	SAR; R 5	WAC; QH; 3	WAC; R 2			5th	39
2021	KR Motorsport	OK	GEN; QH; 2	GEN; R 1	AUB; QH; 3	AUB; R 2	SAR; QH (8)	SAR; R 29	ZUE; QH; 6	ZUE; R 4	2nd	80

== Racing record ==
=== Racing career summary ===
Season	Series	Team	Races	Wins	Poles	F/Laps	Podiums	Points	Position
2022	Formula 4 UAE Championship	Prema Racing	16	6	4	5	8	210	2nd
2022	Italian F4 Championship	Prema Racing	20	2	4	3	10	239	3rd
2022	ADAC Formula 4	Prema Racing	12	1	2	2	9	193	3rd
2023	Formula Regional Middle East Championship	Mumbai Falcons Racing Limited	15	0	0	0	6	131	3rd
2023	Formula Regional European Championship	Prema Racing	20	2	3	1	5	173	5th
2024	Formula Regional Middle East Championship	Mumbai Falcons Racing Limited	15	2	1	2	2	128	3rd
2024	Formula Regional European Championship	Prema Racing	20	7	7	7	12	309	1st
2025	FIA Formula 3 Championship	Trident	19	4	5	4	5	166	1st
2026	FIA Formula 2 Championship	Invicta Racing	25	3	5	6	7	207*	1st*
2026	Formula One	TGR Haas F1 Team	2	0	0	0	0	0*	25th*

* Season still in progress.

=== Complete Formula 4 UAE Championship results ===
(key) (Races in bold indicate pole position) (Races in italics indicate fastest lap)

Year	Team	1	2	3	4	5	6	7	8	9	10	11	12	13	14	15	16	17	18	19	20	Pos	Points
2022	Prema Racing	YMC1; 1	YMC1; 2	YMC1; 3	YMC1; 4	DUB1; 1; 17	DUB1; 2; 12	DUB1; 3; 9	DUB1; 4; 3	DUB2; 1; 1	DUB2; 2; 4	**DUB2**; **3**; 1	DUB2; 4; 7	**DUB3**; **1**; 1	DUB3; 2; 1	DUB3; 3; 9	DUB3; 4; 1	**YMC2**; **1**; 1	YMC2; 2; 2	**YMC2**; **3** Ret	YMC2; 4; 24	2nd	210

=== Complete ADAC Formula 4 Championship results ===
(key) (Races in bold indicate pole position) (Races in italics indicate fastest lap)

Year	Team	1	2	3	4	5	6	7	8	9	10	11	12	13	14	15	16	17	18	Pos	Points
2022	Prema Racing	SPA; 1; 2	SPA; 2; 2	SPA; 3; 1	HOC; 1; 2	HOC; 2; 2	HOC; 3; 4	ZAN; 1; 2	ZAN; 2; 2	ZAN; 3; 5	NÜR1; 1	NÜR1; 2	NÜR1; 3	LAU; 1	LAU; 2	LAU; 3	**NÜR2**; **1**; 2	**NÜR2**; **2**; 10	NÜR2; 3; 3	3rd	193

=== Complete Italian F4 Championship results ===
(key) (Races in bold indicate pole position) (Races in italics indicate fastest lap)

Year	Team	1	2	3	4	5	6	7	8	9	10	11	12	13	14	15	16	17	18	19	20	21	22	Pos	Points
2022	Prema Racing	IMO; 1; 1	IMO; 2; 8	IMO; 3; 2	MIS; 1; 2	MIS; 2; 4	MIS; 3; 1	SPA; 1; 2	SPA; 2; 4	**SPA**; **3**; 3	VLL; 1; 2	VLL; 2 Ret	VLL; 3; 2	**RBR**; **1**; 17	RBR; 2; 2	RBR; 3	RBR; 4; 13	MNZ; 1; 4	MNZ; 2; 10	**MNZ**; **3** C	MUG; 1; 5	MUG; 2; 3	**MUG**; **3** Ret	3rd	239

=== Complete Formula Regional Middle East Championship results ===
(key) (Races in bold indicate pole position) (Races in italics indicate fastest lap)

Year	Entrant	1	2	3	4	5	6	7	8	9	10	11	12	13	14	15	DC	Points
2023	Mumbai Falcons Racing Limited	DUB1; 1; 5	DUB1; 2; 5	DUB1; 3; 4	KUW1; 1; 18†	KUW1; 2; 3	KUW1; 3 Ret	KUW2; 1; 2	KUW2; 2 Ret	KUW2; 3; 2	DUB2; 1; 2	DUB2; 2; 23	DUB2; 3; 16	ABU; 1; 3	ABU; 2; 11	ABU; 3; 3	3rd	131
2024	Mumbai Falcons Racing Limited	YMC1; 1; 5	YMC1; 2 Ret	YMC1; 3 Ret	YMC2; 1; 4	YMC2; 2; 6	YMC2; 3; 13	DUB1; 1; 4	DUB1; 2; 5	**DUB1**; **3**; 1	YMC3; 1; 9	YMC3; 2; 1	YMC3; 3; 6	DUB2; 1; 4	DUB2; 2; 13	DUB2; 3; 8	3rd	118

† – Driver did not finish the race but was classified, as he completed more than 90% of the race distance.

=== Complete Formula Regional European Championship results ===
(key) (Races in bold indicate pole position) (Races in italics indicate fastest lap)

Year	Team	1	2	3	4	5	6	7	8	9	10	11	12	13	14	15	16	17	18	19	20	DC	Points
2023	Prema Racing	IMO; 1; 3	IMO; 2 Ret	CAT; 1; 11	CAT; 2; 6	HUN; 1; 7	HUN; 2; 10	**SPA**; **1**; 1	SPA; 2; 5	MUG; 1; 6	MUG; 2; 2	LEC; 1; 8	LEC; 2; 12	**RBR**; **1**; 1	RBR; 2 Ret	**MNZ**; **1** Ret	MNZ; 2; 2	ZAN; 1; 7	ZAN; 2 Ret	HOC; 1; 4	HOC; 2; 4	5th	173
2024	Prema Racing	**HOC**; **1**; 1	HOC; 2; 2	SPA; 1; 1	**SPA**; **2**; 1	ZAN; 1; 2	**ZAN**; **2**; 1	HUN; 1; 3	HUN; 2; 6	MUG; 1; 5	MUG; 2; 5	**LEC**; **1**; 1	**LEC**; **2**; 6	**IMO**; **1**; 1	**IMO**; **2**; 9	RBR; 1; 11	RBR; 2; 16	CAT; 1; 3	CAT; 2; 4	MNZ; 1; 2	MNZ; 2; 1	1st	309

=== Complete FIA Formula 3 Championship results ===
(key) (Races in bold indicate pole position; races in italics indicate points for the fastest lap of the top-10 finishers)

Year	Entrant	1	2	3	4	5	6	7	8	9	10	11	12	13	14	15	16	17	18	19	20	Pos	Points
2025	Trident	MEL; SPR; Ret	**MEL**; **FEA**; 1	BHR; SPR; 12	**BHR**; **FEA**; 1	IMO; SPR; 11	**IMO**; **FEA**; 3	MON; SPR; 7	MON; FEA; Ret	CAT; SPR; Ret	**CAT**; **FEA**; 1	RBR; SPR; 9	RBR; FEA; 5	SIL; SPR; 8	SIL; FEA; 22	SPA; SPR; 5	SPA; FEA; C	HUN; SPR; 8	**HUN**; **FEA**; 1	MNZ; SPR; 25	MNZ; FEA; 5	1st	166

=== Complete FIA Formula 2 Championship results ===
(key) (Races in bold indicate pole position) (Races in italics indicate fastest lap)

Year	Entrant	1	2	3	4	5	6	7	8	9	10	11	12	13	14	15	16	17	18	19	20	21	22	23	24	25	26	27	28	29	DC	Points
2026	Invicta Racing	MEL; SPR; 11	MEL; FEA; 2	MIA; SPR; 10	MIA; FEA; 3	MTL; SPR; 7	MTL; FEA; 14	MON; SPR; 8	**MON**; **FEA**; Ret	CAT; SPR; 6	**CAT**; **FEA**; 1	RBR; SPR; 9	RBR; FEA; 4	SIL; SPR; 10	**SIL**; **FEA**; 5	SPA; SPR; 6	**SPA**; **FEA**; 1	HUN; SPR; 4	HUN; FEA; 3	MNZ; SPR; Ret	**MNZ**; **FEA**; 2	MAD; SPR; 6	MAD; FEA; 10	BAK; SPR; 15	BAK; FEA1; 4	BAK; FEA2; 1	LSL; SPR	LSL; FEA	YMC; SPR	YMC; FEA	1st*	207*

=== Complete Formula One results ===
(key) (Races in bold indicate pole position; races in italics indicate fastest lap; ^{superscript} indicates point-scoring sprint position)

Year	Entrant	Chassis	Engine	1	2	3	4	5	6	7	8	9	10	11	12	13	14	15	16	17	18	19	20	21	22	23	WDC	Points
2026	TGR Haas F1 Team	Haas VF-26	Ferrari 067/6 1.6 V6 t	AUS	CHN	JPN	MIA	CAN	MON	BCN	AUT	GBR	BEL	HUN	NED	ITA	ESP	AZE	BHR	SIN	USA	MXC	SAP; 20	LVG; 16	QAT	ABU	25th*	0*

* Season still in progress.

== Notes ==
Achievements
Preceded by Enzo Trulli	Formula 4 UAE Championship; Rookies' Champion; 2022	Succeeded by Tuukka Taponen
Preceded by Nikita Bedrin	ADAC Formula 4 Championship; Rookies' Champion; 2022	Defunct
Preceded by Andrea Kimi Antonelli	Formula Regional European Championship; Champion; 2024	Succeeded by Freddie Slater
Preceded by Leonardo Fornaroli	FIA Formula 3 Championship; Champion; 2025	Succeeded by Ugo Ugochukwu
