= Jose Manuel López (engineer) =

Spanish engineer

- Born: Jose Manuel López García
- Citizenship: Spanish
- Education: Universidad Politécnica de Madrid
- Occupation: Engineer
- Employer: Audi Revolut F1 Team
- Title: Race engineer

Jose Manuel López García is a Spanish Formula One engineer. He is currently the Race Engineer to Gabriel Bortoleto at the Audi Revolut F1 Team.

== Career ==
López studied mechanical engineering at the Universidad Politécnica de Madrid and the Delft University of Technology before completing a master's degree in motorsport engineering at Mondragon Unibertsitatea. He began his motorsport career in junior single-seaters, working in Formula Renault and later with Carlin Motorsport, where he held roles in data analysis, simulation and race engineering. During this period he developed vehicle-performance tools, supported driver preparation programmes and contributed to car set-up and aerodynamic correlation work across multiple championships.

In 2015 he joined the Haas F1 Team as a Performance Engineer and Test Race Engineer. He worked with Esteban Gutiérrez during the team's debut 2016 season, partnered Kevin Magnussen from 2017 to 2019, and engineered Pietro Fittipaldi during test events. His responsibilities included simulator correlation, set-up development and trackside performance support, alongside running test programmes and contributing to the integration of factory-based performance tools with circuit operations.

López moved to McLaren in 2020, initially as Lead Performance Engineer and Test Race Engineer for Lando Norris. He later served as Principal Performance Engineer and Deputy Race Engineer, undertaking race-engineering duties and contributing to Norris's podium finishes during the 2023 season. He was subsequently appointed Head of F1 Testing, overseeing the planning and execution of test and TPC (Testing of Previous Cars) programmes, while also working within the McLaren Driver Development Programme. In this role he supported the preparation of junior drivers, including Gabriel Bortoleto, with whom he worked closely during the Brazilian's formative period in the team's academy.

In 2025 López joined the Sauber F1 Team as a Race Engineer, reuniting with Bortoleto for his rookie Formula One season. He formed part of the engineering structure guiding the organisation's transition into the Audi F1 Team works entry from 2026, continuing in a trackside role responsible for race execution, performance direction and the integration of Audi's developing technical programme.
