= Lee Stevenson (motorsport) =

British mechanic

- Citizenship: British
- Occupation: Mechanic
- Employer: Audi Revolut F1 Team
- Title: Team Manager

Lee Stevenson is a British Formula One mechanic and motorsports executive. He is currently the Team Manager at the Audi Revolut F1 Team.

== Career ==
Stevenson began his motorsport career with the Jordan Grand Prix Formula One team, joining as a mechanic in 1999 after initially gaining experience as an intern. He progressed to the race team in 2004 and in 2005 worked on the rear of Tiago Monteiro’s car during Jordan's final season in Formula One.

In 2006 he moved to Red Bull Racing, where he advanced through the garage structure from number four mechanic to second mechanic, before becoming chief mechanic on Daniil Kvyat’s car in 2015. When Kvyat was replaced by Max Verstappen in 2016, Stevenson continued as chief mechanic, remaining in that role throughout Verstappen's championship-winning seasons. Stevenson was part of the crew for all of Verstappen's victories during that period. A notable example came at the 2020 Hungarian Grand Prix, where the Red Bull crew repaired Verstappen's damaged suspension on the grid after a pre-race crash, enabling him to start and finish second. Ahead of the 2023 campaign he was appointed Chief Mechanic of the team, overseeing garage operations until the 2024 Australian Grand Prix.

After leaving Red Bull in early 2024, Stevenson joined Sauber Motorsport, initially as Chief Mechanic from the 2024 Japanese Grand Prix. When the organisation transitioned into the Audi works programme, he remained within the structure and in January 2026 was appointed Team Manager of the Audi F1 Team. In this role he works alongside Audi F1 CEO and Team Principal Mattia Binotto and is responsible for operational delivery, logistics, regulatory compliance, and coordination of trackside processes as Audi enters full works competition.
