= 2026 Mexico City Grand Prix =

Nineteenth round of the 2026 F1 season

Race 19 of 23 in the 2026 Formula One World Championship
← Previous race	Next race →
- Layout of the Autódromo Hermanos Rodríguez

Race details
- Date: 1 November 2026
- Official name: Formula 1 Gran Premio de la Ciudad de México 2026
- Location: Autódromo Hermanos Rodríguez; Mexico City, Mexico
- Course: Permanent racing facility
- Course length: 4.304 km (2.674 miles)
- Distance: 71 laps, 305.584 km (189.738 miles)
- Weather: Sunny
- Attendance: 405,363

Pole position
Driver	(United Kingdom) Lewis Hamilton	Ferrari
- Time: 1:16.514

Fastest lap
Driver	(United Kingdom) Lewis Hamilton	Ferrari
- Time: 1:19.268 on lap 50

Podium
First	(Netherlands) Max Verstappen	Red Bull Racing-Red Bull Ford
Second	(United Kingdom) Lewis Hamilton	Ferrari
Third	(Italy) Kimi Antonelli	Mercedes

The 2026 Mexico City Grand Prix (officially known as the Formula 1 Gran Premio de la Ciudad de México 2026) was a Formula One motor race that was held on 1 November 2026 at the Autódromo Hermanos Rodríguez in Mexico City, Mexico. It was the nineteenth round of the 2026 Formula One World Championship.

Lewis Hamilton (Ferrari) took his first pole position since the 2023 Hungarian Grand Prix, and his first pole position with the team. Kimi Antonelli clinched his first Formula One World Drivers' Championship after achieving third. Antonelli became the youngest Drivers' Champion at the age of 20 years, two months and seven days, beating the previous record holder Sebastian Vettel, the first Italian Drivers' Champion since Alberto Ascari in 1953, and Mercedes' first Drivers' Championship since Hamilton secured his seventh title in 2020. Ahead of him, Max Verstappen (Red Bull) won the race and Hamilton finished second in an eventful race. The Grand Prix also saw Ryo Hirakawa make his Formula One Grand Prix debut with Haas, where he benefitted from drivers ahead of him receiving penalties to score his first Formula One point.

== Background ==
The event was held at the Autódromo Hermanos Rodríguez in Mexico City for the 26th time in the circuit's history, across the weekend of 30 October – 1 November, having previously held twenty editions of the Mexican Grand Prix. The Grand Prix was the ninteenth round of the 2026 Formula One World Championship and the sixth held under the name of the Mexico City Grand Prix, having previously been titled the Mexican Grand Prix.

=== Championship standings before the race ===
Going into the weekend, Kimi Antonelli led the Drivers' Championship with 365 points, 123 points ahead of teammate George Russell in second and 124 ahead of Lewis Hamilton in third. Mercedes, with 607 points, led the Constructors' Championship from Ferrari, who were second with 474 points, and Red Bull and McLaren, who both tied on 355 points.

==== Championship permutations ====
Going into the race, there were 125 points available across the five remaining scheduled rounds. With Antonelli leading the Drivers' Championship by 123 points, he had a chance to secure the title at this event. In order to do so, Antonelli had to finish in the top nine if either Russell or Hamilton would win the Grand Prix. If neither Russell nor Hamilton would win, then Antonelli would have automatically become champion regardless of what they both would do.

In the Constructors' Championship, there were 215 points available across the five remaining scheduled rounds. With Mercedes leading the Constructors' Championship by 123 points, the team had a chance to secure the title at this event if they outscore Ferrari by 39 points.

=== Entrants ===
The drivers and teams were initially the same as published in the season entry list. Esteban Ocon (Haas) was entered into the event and drove for the team in the second practice session, but was replaced ahead of the third free practice session by the team's reserve driver, debutant Ryo Hirakawa. Hirakawa had already driven in Ocon's place for the first practice session. Haas declined to give a reason for the change. Press reports stated Ocon had an argument with team principal Ayao Komatsu that allegedly ended in a physical altercation, Ocon's dismissal, and a legal dispute. Ocon admitted to a "difference of viewpoints" but denied being violent. Two days following the conclusion of the Grand Prix, Ocon was dismissed with immediate effect and replaced with Haas' 2027 signee, Rafael Câmara. Komatsu stated that the decision was "in the best interest of the team", and reaffirmed that the conversations between the team and Ocon that led to his dismissal were an "internal matter".

During the first practice session, ten teams fielded alternate drivers who had not raced in more than two Grands Prix, as required by the Formula One regulations:

- Leonardo Fornaroli for McLaren in place of Lando Norris.
- Frederik Vesti for Mercedes in place of George Russell.
- Ayumu Iwasa for Red Bull in place of Max Verstappen.
- Gabriele Minì for Alpine in place of Franco Colapinto.
- Luke Browning for Williams in place of Alexander Albon.
- Jak Crawford for Aston Martin in place of Lance Stroll.
- Ryo Hirakawa for Haas in place of Esteban Ocon.
- Freddie Slater for Audi in place of Gabriel Bortoleto.
- Colton Herta for Cadillac in place of Valtteri Bottas.
- Nikola Tsolov for Racing Bulls in place of Liam Lawson.

Minì, Slater and Tsolov made their Formula One practice debuts. Tsolov became the first driver from Bulgaria to participate in a Formula One weekend.

The Grand Prix marked Sergio Pérez's (Cadillac) 300th start.

=== Tyre choices ===
Tyre supplier Pirelli selected the C3, C4, and C5 tyre compounds (the softest three in their range) designated hard, medium, and soft, respectively, for teams to use at the event.

== Practice ==
Three free practice sessions were held for the event. The first free practice session was held on 30 October 2026, at 12:30 local time (UTC–6), and was topped by Charles Leclerc (Ferrari) ahead of Kimi Antonelli (Mercedes) and his teammate Frederik Vesti. The second free practice was held on the same day, at 16:00 local time, and was topped by Leclerc ahead of Lando Norris (McLaren) and George Russell (Mercedes). A red flag was observed due to debris from an incident between Max Verstappen (Red Bull) and Liam Lawson (Racing Bulls). The third practice session was held on 31 October 2026, at 11:30 local time, and was topped by Norris ahead of Antonelli and Leclerc.

== Qualifying ==
Qualifying was held on 31 October 2026, at 15:00 local time (UTC–6), and determined the starting grid order for the race.

=== Qualifying report ===
In the first segment of qualifying (Q1), Lewis Hamilton (Ferrari) set the early pace ahead of Oscar Piastri (McLaren) and Fernando Alonso (Aston Martin). With 11 minutes remaining, Alonso was instructed to stop his car and pulled over in the stadium section, bringing out the red flag. His stoppage was attributed to a suspected water-pressure issue affecting the energy recovery system. After the restart, Charles Leclerc briefly led before Hamilton improved to finish the segment fastest. Isack Hadjar (Red Bull) recovered from an earlier lock up to take second behind Hamilton, ahead of Leclerc, Piastri and George Russell (Mercedes). Alexander Albon (Williams) was eliminated in 17th, followed by Alonso, Ryo Hirakawa (Haas), Lance Stroll (Aston Martin) and the Cadillac drivers Sergio Pérez and Valtteri Bottas. Hirakawa was making his first Formula One qualifying appearance after replacing Esteban Ocon for the remainder of the weekend.

In the second segment (Q2), Leclerc initially set the pace, with Arvid Lindblad (Racing Bulls) briefly second despite having reported smoke in his cockpit earlier in the session. Max Verstappen (Red Bull) subsequently moved ahead, while Hamilton and Lando Norris (McLaren) were affected by lock ups. Hamilton recovered to progress in fourth. Norris used fresh tyres on his final attempt to top the segment. After abandoning an earlier attempt, Piastri lost time through the esses on his final lap and reported a lack of rear grip. Pierre Gasly (Alpine) secured the final place in Q3, leaving Nico Hülkenberg (Audi) 11th, followed by Franco Colapinto (Alpine), Piastri, Gabriel Bortoleto (Audi), Oliver Bearman (Haas) and Carlos Sainz Jr. (Williams). Bearman had a lap time deleted for exceeding track limits. Piastri's elimination was his first failure to reach Q3 since the 2024 edition of the race.

In the final segment (Q3), Leclerc led the opening runs ahead of Verstappen, while Hamilton lost time after missing the apex at turn 10. For his final attempt, Russell abandoned Mercedes' additional tyre-preparation lap and began his timed lap directly after the out-lap, although his car still carried the fuel intended for the extra lap. He briefly took provisional pole, but Hamilton responded to move ahead. Hamilton later credited his preparation on the out-lap with bringing his tyres into the correct operating window. He secured pole without setting the fastest time in any individual sector. Leclerc's final attempt was compromised by oversteer at turn 10, leaving him third. Verstappen set the fastest opening sector and improved his own middle-sector time, but a lock up at turn 13 left him fourth. He subsequently said that encountering Norris ahead had caused him to lose his braking reference. Kimi Antonelli (Mercedes) was fifth, followed by Norris, who abandoned his final attempt, and Hadjar. Liam Lawson (Racing Bulls), Lindblad and Gasly initially completed the top ten. Hamilton secured his 105th career pole, his first since the 2023 Hungarian Grand Prix and his first for Ferrari. At 41, he became the oldest polesitter since Mario Andretti in 1982. It was also Ferrari's first Grand Prix pole of the season.

Verstappen and Lawson had each received a one-place grid penalty following their collision in the second practice session. Verstappen's penalty dropped him to fifth on the grid, promoting Antonelli to fourth. Lawson was subsequently disqualified from qualifying after his car failed to comply with the minimum MGU-K power requirement immediately after completing his fastest Q2 lap. His exclusion moved Lindblad, Gasly and Hülkenberg into eighth, ninth and tenth on the grid, respectively. Bottas also received a 50-place grid penalty for exceeding his allocation of power unit components.

=== Qualifying classification ===
Pos.	No.	Driver	Constructor	Qualifying times			Final grid
Pos.	No.	Driver	Constructor	Q1	Q2	Q3	Final grid
1	44	(United Kingdom) Lewis Hamilton	Ferrari	1:17.341	1:16.953	1:16.514	1
2	63	(United Kingdom) George Russell	Mercedes	1:17.659	1:17.027	1:16.523	2
3	16	(Monaco) Charles Leclerc	Ferrari	1:17.506	1:16.944	1:16.633	3
4	3	(Netherlands) Max Verstappen	Red Bull Racing-Red Bull Ford	1:17.942	1:16.876	1:16.692	5^{a}
5	12	(Italy) Kimi Antonelli	Mercedes	1:17.918	1:17.133	1:16.707	4
6	1	(United Kingdom) Lando Norris	McLaren-Mercedes	1:17.733	1:16.728	1:16.824	6
7	6	(France) Isack Hadjar	Red Bull Racing-Red Bull Ford	1:17.385	1:17.047	1:16.900	7
8	41	(United Kingdom) Arvid Lindblad	Racing Bulls-Red Bull Ford	1:18.210	1:17.135	1:17.117	8
9	10	(France) Pierre Gasly	Alpine-Mercedes	1:18.194	1:17.278	1:17.153	9
10	27	(Germany) Nico Hülkenberg	Audi	1:17.868	1:17.306	N/A	10
11	43	(Argentina) Franco Colapinto	Alpine-Mercedes	1:18.517	1:17.640	N/A	11
12	81	(Australia) Oscar Piastri	McLaren-Mercedes	1:17.659	1:17.646	N/A	12
13	5	(Brazil) Gabriel Bortoleto	Audi	1:17.727	1:17.680	N/A	13
14	87	(United Kingdom) Oliver Bearman	Haas-Ferrari	1:18.083	1:18.083	N/A	14
15	55	(Spain) Carlos Sainz Jr.	Atlassian Williams-Mercedes	1:18.521	1:18.885	N/A	15
16	23	(Thailand) Alexander Albon	Atlassian Williams-Mercedes	1:18.630	N/A	N/A	16
17	14	(Spain) Fernando Alonso	Aston Martin Aramco-Honda	1:18.908	N/A	N/A	17
18	50	(Japan) Ryo Hirakawa	Haas-Ferrari	1:18.958	N/A	N/A	18
19	18	(Canada) Lance Stroll	Aston Martin Aramco-Honda	1:19.072	N/A	N/A	19
20	11	(Mexico) Sergio Pérez	Cadillac-Ferrari	1:19.105	N/A	N/A	20
21	77	(Finland) Valtteri Bottas	Cadillac-Ferrari	1:19.852	N/A	N/A	21^{b}
DSQ	30	(New Zealand) Liam Lawson	Racing Bulls-Red Bull Ford	1:18.097	1:17.207	1:17.029	PL^{c}
107% time: 1:22.754

Notes

- ^a – Max Verstappen received a one-place grid penalty for driving erratically in the second free practice session.
- ^b – Valtteri Bottas received a 50-place grid penalty for exceeding his quota of power unit elements. The penalty made no difference as he qualified in the last position.
- ^c – Liam Lawson received a one-place grid penalty for driving erratically in the second free practice session. He originally qualified eighth, but was disqualified due to a technical infringement. He was permitted to start at the stewards' discretion. He was required to start the race from the pit lane as his car was modified under parc fermé conditions.

== Race ==
The race was held on 1 November 2026, at 14:00 local time (UTC–6), and was run for 71 laps.

=== Race report ===
When the lights went out, Lewis Hamilton was able to retain the leading spot, with second-placed George Russell holding his position as well before getting overtaken by Charles Leclerc, Max Verstappen and Kimi Antonelli en route to the first chicane due to a suspected battery issue at the first few meters. With both Ferrari's leading the pack, Leclerc opted to overtake Hamilton in turns 1 and 2, with the attempt failing before aiming for a move around the outside of Hamilton, causing him to go wide and cut the corner at turn 4. Hamilton's defence against his teammate then compromised his run out of turn 4, enabling Verstappen to go past Hamilton for second, with Leclerc maintaining his leading position after cutting the chicane. Both Hamilton and Verstappen were not satisfied with Leclerc's manoeuvre, with Hamilton stating he was pushed off by his own team-mate whilst Verstappen insisted Leclerc should give the position back. Leclerc was then handed a five-second time penalty for leaving the track and gaining an advantage. Further down the order, Russell drove into Isack Hadjar, causing him to spin, marking the second consecutive race in which both drivers had come together, leading to a penalty for Russell as he received a ten-second time penalty for causing a collision.

By lap 7, Aston Martin were once again plagued by technical issues. Both drivers Fernando Alonso and Lance Stroll were forced to stop their cars due to engine-related issues on lap 6. Stroll's retirement caused a virtual safety car phase which did not lead to any pit stops involving the front runners. Despite eventually getting penalised by race control for his antics in lap 1, Leclerc initially managed to pull off a gap big enough to hold off Verstappen in second in order not to potentially lose the race victory, with Hamilton aiming to attack Verstappen who opted to start on the medium compound tyres as opposed to several others at the front. Leclerc's penalty, however, was subject of controversial discussions as race control were considered to be lenient towards Leclerc due to mitigating circumstances, whereas several experts and drivers including Hamilton believed that those actions should normally be penalised with a time penalty of ten seconds, as this being subject of discussion at the drivers' briefing pre-race.

With the race nearly hitting half-time on lap 28, both Leclerc and Verstappen decided to come into the pits for their mandatory pit stops, with Leclerc giving up his soft rubber for fresh mediums and Verstappen doing viceversa. With the aid of Leclerc's penalty to be served in the pits, this gave Verstappen the opportunity to claim the provisional lead from Leclerc in order to gain clean air for the remainder of the race, knowing that Hamilton would eventually come in for his pit stop. This would leave Antonelli in a spot for clean air ahead of his teammate Russell and Lando Norris, with all three drivers opting to extend their first stint. However, on lap 44, another yellow flag was waived due to an accident of Cadillac's Valtteri Bottas, whose suspension broke under high speeds while braking in a similar incident to teammate Sergio Pérez's at the Canadian Grand Prix. Bottas spun into the Tecpro barriers at turn 1 in front of the grandstand, triggering a safety car. While the leading duo consisting of Verstappen and Leclerc stayed out, Hamilton instead decided to pit for a second time in order to attack the duo with new soft tyres for an eventual restart, compromising track position towards Antonelli who claimed third after staying out on track. A few laps later, the race was red-flagged due to necessary repairs on the barriers, bringing the field back altogether.

Prior to the restart on lap 47, Verstappen started in front of both Ferrari drivers, with Hamilton being reinstated to third as he was ahead of Antonelli before the race was temporarily coming to a halt. At the restart, Verstappen retained the lead whilst Hamilton immediately got past Leclerc, with the Monegasque driver suffering a severe flat spot heading into turn 1 after locking up massively. Meanwhile, Hamilton launched for an attack at turn 1 against Verstappen, with the latter slightly pushing him off the track in order to maintain the lead. Leclerc's mishap allowed Antonelli to get past the Ferrari a lap later to claim third, whilst Leclerc had to defend himself against Norris and Russell. Notably, Racing Bulls driver Liam Lawson, who started the race from pit lane following the exclusion from qualifying the previous day, saw himself being in the top ten after the restart. Meanwhile, Audi's Nico Hülkenberg rammed Haas' Oliver Bearman at the entry of turn 4, spinning Bearman around and giving him terminal damage to his diffuser. Consequently, Hülkenberg was almost immediately given a ten-second time penalty for causing a collision. As Hamilton was trying to maintain the pressure towards Verstappen in the battle for the win, the race saw the third and final yellow flag of the race following a collision between Oscar Piastri and Arvid Lindblad, with the former damaging his car and the latter sustaining heavy, race-ending suspension damage on lap 59, bringing out another safety car.

An uneventful restart followed, with Verstappen holding his position from Hamilton and Antonelli behind. Meanwhile, Norris desperately tried to attack Leclerc on several occasions during the final stages of the race to claim fourth, with Leclerc displaying notable defensive abilities. In an eventful race, Verstappen was able to withstand the pressure from Hamilton, as he crossed the line to take his third win of the season, his sixth on Mexican soil and his seventh consecutive podium. Hamilton missed out on the victory by nearly eight tenths of a second, with Antonelli finishing the race in third to seal his maiden Drivers' Championship, becoming the 36th different Drivers' Champion since the sport's introduction back in 1950, the youngest ever Formula One World Drivers' Champion aged 20 years and 68 days after surpassing Sebastian Vettel's record from 2010 and Italy's first Drivers' Champion since two-time world champion Alberto Ascari in 73 years. Leclerc held on to fourth ahead of Norris and Russell, with Piastri, Colapinto, Lawson and Gasly completing the top ten at the line.

=== Post-race and championship impact ===
Several hours after the race, race control decided to hand penalties to Piastri and both Alpine drivers Pierre Gasly and Franco Colapinto. Whilst Piastri was handed a ten-second time penalty for causing a collision against Lindblad, both Gasly and Colapinto received post-race 10- and 30-second penalties for yellow flag infringements, respectively. This eventually elevated Gabriel Bortoleto, Isack Hadjar and Ryo Hirakawa into the top ten, with Hirakawa scoring his first Formula One points on debut after being called as Esteban Ocon's replacement following the Frenchman's fallout with Haas over the course of the weekend.

Hamilton was frustrated with teammate Leclerc after the latter's race-starting manoeuvre compromised his momentum into turn 4, though he reaffirmed that intra-team discussions would be held following the race.

It's incredible, we have to pinch ourselves because it seems like yesterday he was 11 years old in the garage in junior karting. And it goes so fast. He wins the junior formula, then a difficult year in F2 and that's already where people started to doubt. Then when Lewis [Hamilton] told me 'I'm going to Ferrari', it was my immediate reaction that we've got to put him in the car. But people were doubters. I was thinking before, we had two sponsors leaving us because of that, because who is this kid? There were others who stayed with us until today, some are here that reap the full reward and then the difficult year. People said he shouldn't even be in F1, he should be at a smaller team, 10 races and no points, the tears in Spa, and then this. I'm just so proud for the team, all of them continued to trust him and he delivered."

— Mercedes' team principal Toto Wolff summing up Antonelli's path and the team's support for him despite disclosing that several doubters have appeared upon Antonelli's recruitment at Mercedes from 2025 onwards.

Following his triumph, Antonelli was widely praised for the season he had, with race winner Verstappen pointing out: “I think to achieve this in your second year in F1 is always very impressive. Because, of course, at his age as well, to be so solid, not make big mistakes, and of course, also beat your experienced team mate, he's just driven incredible. And I'm very proud of him, how he has handled himself this whole season. It's not always easy to deliver every single weekend, but he has done that, and he's the deserved champion this year.”

Hamilton, Antonelli's predecessor at Mercedes, added: “I mean, it was beautiful to be up there with these two and to be up there with Kimi for his first World Championship. I think it was a very special moment, one of the most special moments that I remember having here.”

Antonelli himself was emotionally overwhelmed following his achievement, being complimentary of Mercedes across the entire season, his friends and family, "I’m speechless. I’m trying to process what has just happened. It’s been an incredible season, and to share this podium with Max and Lewis is truly incredible. And yeah, looking forward to some more battles in the future. This weekend I did feel a bit more tense, but I’m just so happy, and happy that we got it done, and now we can enjoy the rest of the season.” [It’s] a moment that means so much. It’s a day I will remember forever.”

With the Drivers' Championship secured, Verstappen's victory elevated him from fourth to second with 261 points, swapping places with Russell as he occupied fourth after being demoted two places. The four drivers behind the new-crowned champion Antonelli in the standings were separated by only sixteen points with four races remaining. In the Constructors' Championship, the top five remained unchanged, with the gap between Mercedes on top and Ferrari in second shrinking to 126 points, with Mercedes having the opportunity to secure its ninth Constructors' Championship title and their first since 2021 as they need to outscore Ferrari by only three points at the next round in Brazil.

=== Race classification ===
Pos.	No.	Driver	Constructor	Laps	Time/Retired	Grid	Points
1	3	(Netherlands) Max Verstappen	Red Bull Racing-Red Bull Ford	71	2:20:28.772	5	25
2	44	(United Kingdom) Lewis Hamilton	Ferrari	71	+0.799	1	18
3	12	(Italy) Kimi Antonelli	Mercedes	71	+4.006	4	15
4	16	(Monaco) Charles Leclerc	Ferrari	71	+10.707	3	12
5	1	(United Kingdom) Lando Norris	McLaren-Mercedes	71	+11.778	6	10
6	63	(United Kingdom) George Russell	Mercedes	71	+12.263	2	8
7	30	(New Zealand) Liam Lawson	Racing Bulls-Red Bull Ford	71	+20.899	PL	6
8	5	(Brazil) Gabriel Bortoleto	Audi	71	+22.041	13	4
9	6	(France) Isack Hadjar	Red Bull Racing-Red Bull Ford	71	+22.503	7	2
10	50	(Japan) Ryo Hirakawa	Haas-Ferrari	71	+25.373	18	1
11	23	(Thailand) Alexander Albon	Atlassian Williams-Mercedes	71	+27.562	16	
12	55	(Spain) Carlos Sainz	Atlassian Williams-Mercedes	71	+28.638	15	
13	81	(Australia) Oscar Piastri	McLaren-Mercedes	71	+29.475^{a}	12	
14	27	(Germany) Nico Hülkenberg	Audi	71	+29.977	10	
15	43	(Argentina) Franco Colapinto	Alpine-Mercedes	71	+30.204^{b}	11	
16	11	(Mexico) Sergio Pérez	Cadillac-Ferrari	71	+30.695	20	
17	10	(France) Pierre Gasly	Alpine-Mercedes	71	+51.483^{c}	9	
Ret	41	(United Kingdom) Arvid Lindblad	Racing Bulls-Red Bull Ford	58	Collision	8	
Ret	87	(United Kingdom) Oliver Bearman	Haas-Ferrari	47	Collision damage	14	
Ret	77	(Finland) Valtteri Bottas	Cadillac-Ferrari	42	Accident	21	
Ret	18	(Canada) Lance Stroll	Aston Martin Aramco-Honda	5	Engine	19	
Ret	14	(Spain) Fernando Alonso	Aston Martin Aramco-Honda	5	Engine	17	

Notes

- ^a – Oscar Piastri finished seventh on track, but received a post-race 10-second time penalty for causing a collision with Arvid Lindblad.
- ^b – Franco Colapinto finished eighth on track, but received a post-race 10-second time penalty for failing to slow under yellow flags.
- ^c – Pierre Gasly finished 10th on track, but received a post-race stop and go penalty converted into a 30-second time penalty for failing to slow under double yellow flags.

== Championship standings after the race ==
Drivers' Championship standings

	Pos.	Driver	Points
	1	(Italy) **Kimi Antonelli**	380
2	2	(Netherlands) Max Verstappen	261
	3	(United Kingdom) Lewis Hamilton	259
2	4	(United Kingdom) George Russell	250
	5	(Monaco) Charles Leclerc	245

Constructors' Championship standings

Pos.	Constructor	Points
1	(Germany) **Mercedes***	630
2	(Italy) **Ferrari***	504
3	(Austria) Red Bull Racing-Red Bull Ford	382
4	(United Kingdom) McLaren-Mercedes	365
5	(Italy) Racing Bulls-Red Bull Ford	108

- Note: Only the top five positions are included for both sets of standings.
- Competitors marked in bold with an asterisk still have a mathematical chance of becoming World Champion.

Previous race: 2026 United States Grand Prix	FIA Formula One World Championship; 2026 season	Next race: 2026 São Paulo Grand Prix
Previous race: 2025 Mexico City Grand Prix	Mexico City Grand Prix	Next race: 2027 Mexico City Grand Prix
