= 2026 São Paulo Grand Prix =

Nineteenth round of the 2026 F1 season

Race 20 of 23 in the 2026 Formula One World Championship
← Previous race	Next race →
- Layout of the Autódromo José Carlos Pace

Race details
- Date: 8 November 2026
- Official name: Formula 1 MSC Cruises Grande Prêmio de São Paulo 2026
- Location: Autódromo José Carlos Pace; São Paulo, Brazil
- Course: Permanent racing facility
- Course length: 4.309 km (2.677 miles)
- Distance: 71 laps, 305.879 km (190.064 miles)
- Weather: Overcast
- Attendance: 317,096

Pole position
Driver	(United Kingdom) Lando Norris	McLaren-Mercedes
- Time: 1:27.470

Fastest lap
Driver	(Italy) Kimi Antonelli	Mercedes
- Time: 1:12.689 on lap 55

Podium
First	(United Kingdom) Lando Norris	McLaren-Mercedes
Second	(Netherlands) Max Verstappen	Red Bull Racing-Red Bull Ford
Third	(France) Isack Hadjar	Red Bull Racing-Red Bull Ford

The 2026 São Paulo Grand Prix (officially known as the Formula 1 MSC Cruises Grande Prêmio de São Paulo 2026) was a Formula One motor race that was held on 8 November 2026 at the Interlagos Circuit in São Paulo, Brazil. It was the twentieth round of the 2026 Formula One World Championship. Lewis Hamilton (Ferrari) started his 400th race, and Mercedes won their first Constructors' Championship since 2021. During a wet qualification session, Lando Norris (McLaren) took pole position. He converted it to a win in a damp Grand Prix, with Max Verstappen (Red Bull), who started 21st, and his teammate Isack Hadjar rounding off the podium.

== Background ==
The event was held at the Interlagos Circuit in São Paulo for the 43rd time in the circuit's history, having previously held thirty-seven editions of the Brazilian Grand Prix, across the weekend of 6–8 November. The Grand Prix was the twentieth round of the 2026 Formula One World Championship and the sixth held under the name of the São Paulo Grand Prix, having previously been titled the Brazilian Grand Prix.

=== Championship standings before the race ===
Going into the weekend, Kimi Antonelli, who clinched the title at the preceding Mexico City Grand Prix, led the Drivers' Championship with 380 points, 119 points ahead of Max Verstappen in second and 121 ahead of Lewis Hamilton in third. Mercedes, with 630 points, led the Constructors' Championship from Ferrari, who were second with 504 points, and Red Bull, who were third with 382 points.

==== Championship permutations ====
Going into the weekend, Mercedes led Ferrari by 126 points, with 172 points available with four rounds remaining. Mercedes had a chance to secure their first Constructors' Championship since 2021 if they outscored Ferrari by at least three points.

=== Entrants ===
The drivers and teams were the same as published in the season entry list with the exception of Esteban Ocon at Haas, who was removed from the line-up following a disagreement with his team at the preceding Mexico City Grand Prix. Ocon was replaced by Rafael Câmara, who made his Formula One debut.

During the first practice session, six teams fielded alternate drivers who had not raced in more than two Grands Prix, as required by the Formula One regulations:

- Leonardo Fornaroli for McLaren in place of Oscar Piastri.
- Dino Beganovic for Ferrari in place of Charles Leclerc.
- Freddie Slater for Audi in place of Nico Hülkenberg.
- Colton Herta for Cadillac in place of Sergio Pérez.
- Luke Browning for Williams in place of Carlos Sainz Jr.
- Gabriele Minì for Alpine in place of Pierre Gasly.

The Grand Prix marked Lewis Hamilton's (Ferrari) 400th race, making him the second driver to reach that milestone after Fernando Alonso.

=== Tyre choices ===
Tyre supplier Pirelli selected the C3, C4, and C5 tyre compounds (the softest three in their range) designated hard, medium, and soft, respectively, for teams to use at the event.

== Practice ==
Three free practice sessions were held for the event. The first free practice session was held on 6 November 2026, at 12:30 local time (UTC–3), and was topped by Lando Norris (McLaren) ahead of Kimi Antonelli (Mercedes) and Max Verstappen (Red Bull). A red flag was observed due to Freddie Slater (Audi) stopping on track. The second free practice session was held on the same day, at 16:00 local time, and was topped by Antonelli ahead of Norris and Verstappen. The third practice session was held on 7 November 2026, at 11:30 local time, and was topped by Verstappen ahead of Antonelli and Norris.

== Qualifying ==
Qualifying was held on 7 November 2026, at 15:00 local time (UTC–3), and determined the starting grid order for the race.

=== Qualifying report ===
Some drivers did one lap in the heavy rain. Some used the full wets, while some were on the intermediates, where Kimi Antonelli (Mercedes) reported aquaplaning. Due to the conditions, the session was red flagged and the session time stopped until it subsided. Meanwhile, Oliver Bearman (Haas) was given a reprimand for reversing in the pitlane to switch to full wets.

Over an hour later, the session was restarted, with all drivers on full wets and Rafael Câmara (Haas) spinning out as Fernando Alonso briefly topped the session in his Aston Martin, before Max Verstappen (Red Bull) and Charles Leclerc (Ferrari) displaced him while Gabriel Bortoleto (Audi) damaged his car in a manner that forced his early retirement. Shortly after this occurred, his teammate Nico Hülkenberg ended up briefly topping the session before being displaced, again by Verstappen. As Lance Stroll (Aston Martin) went off-track, Hülkenberg, Bearman, Verstappen, and George Russell (Mercedes) all posted fast times to top the session, before they were all displaced by Lando Norris (McLaren).

Câmara hit the wall in an otherwise uneventful Q2. This stopped the session, leaving Lewis Hamilton (who was making his 400th start, and was facing a grid drop due to his Ferrari's failure in the third practice session), Oscar Piastri (McLaren), Arvid Lindblad (whose Racing Bulls' engine was damaged), Carlos Sainz Jr. (Williams), and Max Verstappen (who was also facing a grid drop for Red Bull) out of the third session. Russell posted the fastest time for Q2, while Fernando Alonso (Aston Martin) reached Q3 for the first time this season.

Heavy rain was about to hit the Interlagos Circuit for Q3. Antonelli's race engineer Peter Bonnington advised his driver he may have only one lap before it arrived, and that the rain would be intense. Indeed, all drivers did one hotlap. One particular instance was Russell, who was already being slowed down by Alexander Albon (Williams) and was already poised to take a grid penalty for new engine components. He was mad at his team about being unable to finish the lap, insisting that a complete lap would have netted him provisional pole position, to the point team principal Toto Wolff had to appear on the radio to tell him he was in second place. The heavy rain prevented further runs. Norris' provisional pole position time was enough for him to secure pole position - his third consecutive at Interlagos - behind Antonelli and Russell, so Liam Lawson (Racing Bulls) was promoted to third after penalties were applied.

=== Qualifying classification ===
Pos.	No.	Driver	Constructor	Qualifying times			Final grid
Pos.	No.	Driver	Constructor	Q1	Q2	Q3	Final grid
1	1	(United Kingdom) Lando Norris	McLaren-Mercedes	1:30.939	1:29.207	1:27.470	1
2	63	(United Kingdom) George Russell	Mercedes	1:31.206	1:26.745	1:27.674	7^{a}
3	12	(Italy) Kimi Antonelli	Mercedes	1:32.229	1:29.302	1:28.095	2
4	16	(Monaco) Charles Leclerc	Ferrari	1:32.121	1:28.082	1:28.289	14^{b}
5	30	(New Zealand) Liam Lawson	Racing Bulls-Red Bull Ford	1:32.085	1:27.049	1:28.321	3
6	27	(Germany) Nico Hülkenberg	Audi	1:31.693	1:28.361	1:28.668	4
7	6	(France) Isack Hadjar	Red Bull Racing-Red Bull Ford	1:32.059	1:27.218	1:28.763	5
8	87	(United Kingdom) Oliver Bearman	Haas-Ferrari	1:33.030	1:29.130	1:29.831	6
9	14	(Spain) Fernando Alonso	Aston Martin Aramco-Honda	1:32.092	1:29.072	1:30.311	8
10	23	(Thailand) Alexander Albon	Atlassian Williams-Mercedes	1:33.150	1:28.918	1:30.456	9
11	44	(United Kingdom) Lewis Hamilton	Ferrari	1:31.666	1:30.001	N/A	20^{c}
12	81	(Australia) Oscar Piastri	McLaren-Mercedes	1:32.251	1:30.369	N/A	10
13	51	(Brazil) Rafael Câmara	Haas-Ferrari	1:32.809	1:31.515	N/A	11
14	41	(United Kingdom) Arvid Lindblad	Racing Bulls-Red Bull Ford	1:32.306	1:31.687	N/A	18^{d}
15	55	(Spain) Carlos Sainz Jr.	Atlassian Williams-Mercedes	1:32.959	1:31.785	N/A	12
16	3	(Netherlands) Max Verstappen	Red Bull Racing-Red Bull Ford	1:31.238	No time	N/A	21^{e}
17	43	(Argentina) Franco Colapinto	Alpine-Mercedes	1:33.327	N/A	N/A	13
18	10	(France) Pierre Gasly	Alpine-Mercedes	1:33.449	N/A	N/A	15
19	18	(Canada) Lance Stroll	Aston Martin Aramco-Honda	1:33.653	N/A	N/A	16
20	77	(Finland) Valtteri Bottas	Cadillac-Ferrari	1:33.774	N/A	N/A	17
21	11	(Mexico) Sergio Pérez	Cadillac-Ferrari	1:34.509	N/A	N/A	22^{f}
22	5	(Brazil) Gabriel Bortoleto	Audi	1:41.564	N/A	N/A	19^{g}
107% time: 1:37.304^{h}

Notes

- ^a – George Russell received a five-place grid penalty for exceeding his quota of power unit elements.
- ^b – Charles Leclerc received a ten-place grid penalty for exceeding his quota of power unit elements.
- ^c – Lewis Hamilton received a 75-place grid penalty for exceeding his quota of power unit elements.
- ^d – Arvid Lindblad received a ten-place grid penalty for exceeding his quota of power unit elements.
- ^e – Max Verstappen received a 30-place grid penalty for exceeding his quota of power unit elements.
- ^f – Sergio Pérez received a 30-place grid penalty for exceeding his quota of power unit elements.
- ^g – Gabriel Bortoleto received a ten-place grid penalty for exceeding his quota of power unit elements.
- ^h – As qualifying was held on a wet track, the 107% rule was not in force.

== Race ==
The race was held on 8 November 2026, at 14:00 local time (UTC–3), and was ran for 71 laps.

=== Race report ===
The race was held in overcast conditions, with rain occurring both at the start and at the end of the race. Rain earlier in the day meant all drivers used the intermediate tyre. During the installation lap, Kimi Antonelli (Mercedes) spun off at turn 12, and safely recovered. A stubborn wheel nut on Valtteri Bottas's car (Cadillac) forced him out of the race.

Off the line, Antonelli and Liam Lawson (Racing Bulls) both passed polesitter Lando Norris (McLaren). At the same time, Lewis Hamilton (Ferrari) and Max Verstappen (Red Bull) both made up positions from their low position grid starts, though Hamilton was placed under investigation for leaving the track on turn 5 to pass Oliver Bearman (Haas). Hamilton would give back the position to Bearman, so the stewards deemed the turn 5 incident unpunishable.

Slick tyres would be in order by lap 14, with all drivers switching. During one stop in particular, George Russell (Mercedes) spun in the pit exit. At the same time, Antonelli, who was now being hounded by Norris for the lead, reported problems with his suspension, which would come to light when he spun at turn 1 by lap 20, giving Norris the lead. Antonelli reported that his car was "pulling to one side under acceleration", and by lap 24 he went straight at the same corner again to give Verstappen third. Meanwhile, Arvid Lindblad (Racing Bulls) was battling Alexander Albon (Williams) for ninth, the latter having to contend with Fernando Alonso (Aston Martin), who dropped to the midfield after running wide at turn 3 early on, and Pierre Gasly (Alpine), with Charles Leclerc (Ferrari) behind Gasly, after Lindblad pulled away. Albon went wide while defending from Alonso and rejoined unsafely in front of Gasly. The stewards gave Albon a five-second penalty for the incident. A similar incident occurred with Nico Hülkenberg (Audi) and Franco Colapinto (Alpine) later in the race, with Hülkenberg obtaining a ten-second penalty.

By lap 32, Lance Stroll (Aston Martin) retired his car in the pit lane due to a flat battery. Hamilton, who took another stop by lap 38, was now a lap down; he unlapped himself from Norris by the following lap. By lap 46, light rain was reported, and Antonelli was told that intermediates would have to be used should the heavy rain arrive. All drivers came in for intermediates by lap 61; Norris had been distancing himself from second-placed Verstappen, who had switched positions with Hadjar. At the same time, Hamilton spun near the pit entry, which brought out a brief yellow flag, and escaped without further damage.

Russell reported a similar issue to Antonelli on lap 65, though he was able to carry on. Leclerc and Lawson were now engaged in a battle, with an incident of Leclerc hitting Lawson's wheels being noted. Norris won the race ahead of Verstappen and Hadjar.

=== Post-race ===
Following the race, Leclerc, Antonelli and Bearman were all penalised: Leclerc for hitting Lawson's wheels, and Antonelli and Bearman both for unsafe pit releases. Leclerc dropped to eighth, giving Lawson seventh.

=== Race classification ===
Pos.	No.	Driver	Constructor	Laps	Time/Retired	Grid	Points
1	1	(United Kingdom) Lando Norris	McLaren-Mercedes	71	1:35:23.504	1	25
2	3	(Netherlands) Max Verstappen	Red Bull Racing-Red Bull Ford	71	+14.602	21	18
3	6	(France) Isack Hadjar	Red Bull Racing-Red Bull Ford	71	+24.485	5	15
4	63	(United Kingdom) George Russell	Mercedes	71	+33.991	7	12
5	12	(Italy) Kimi Antonelli	Mercedes	71	+41.017^{a}	2	10
6	81	(Australia) Oscar Piastri	McLaren-Mercedes	71	+56.475	10	8
7	30	(New Zealand) Liam Lawson	Racing Bulls-Red Bull Ford	71	+1:15.402	3	6
8	16	(Monaco) Charles Leclerc	Ferrari	71	+1:18.586^{b}	14	4
9	44	(United Kingdom) Lewis Hamilton	Ferrari	70	+1 lap	20	2
10	27	(Germany) Nico Hülkenberg	Audi	70	+1 lap	4	1
11	41	(United Kingdom) Arvid Lindblad	Racing Bulls-Red Bull Ford	70	+1 lap	18	
12	14	(Spain) Fernando Alonso	Aston Martin Aramco-Honda	70	+1 lap	8	
13	43	(Argentina) Franco Colapinto	Alpine-Mercedes	70	+1 lap	13	
14	10	(France) Pierre Gasly	Alpine-Mercedes	70	+1 lap	15	
15	23	(Thailand) Alexander Albon	Atlassian Williams-Mercedes	70	+1 lap	9	
16	5	(Brazil) Gabriel Bortoleto	Audi	70	+1 lap	19	
17	87	(United Kingdom) Oliver Bearman	Haas-Ferrari	70	+1 lap^{c}	6	
18	11	(Mexico) Sergio Pérez	Cadillac-Ferrari	69	+2 laps	22	
19	55	(Spain) Carlos Sainz Jr.	Atlassian Williams-Mercedes	69	+2 laps	12	
20	51	(Brazil) Rafael Câmara	Haas-Ferrari	69	+2 laps	11	
Ret	18	(Canada) Lance Stroll	Aston Martin Aramco-Honda	30	Battery	16	
DNS	77	(Finland) Valtteri Bottas	Cadillac-Ferrari	0	Wheel nut	—^{d}	

Notes

- ^a – Kimi Antonelli received a five-second time penalty for an unsafe release. His final position was not affected by the penalty.
- ^b – Charles Leclerc finished seventh on track, but received a post-race five-second time penalty for causing a collision with Liam Lawson.
- ^c – Oliver Bearman received a five-second time penalty for an unsafe release. His final position was not affected by the penalty.
- ^d – Valtteri Bottas did not start the race due to a technical issue. His place on the grid was left vacant.

== Championship standings after the race ==
Drivers' Championship standings

	Pos.	Driver	Points
	1	(Italy) **Kimi Antonelli**	390
	2	(Netherlands) Max Verstappen	279
1	3	(United Kingdom) George Russell	262
1	4	(United Kingdom) Lewis Hamilton	261
	5	(Monaco) Charles Leclerc	249

Constructors' Championship standings

Pos.	Constructor	Points
1	(Germany) **Mercedes**	652
2	(Italy) Ferrari	510
3	(Austria) Red Bull Racing-Red Bull Ford	415
4	(United Kingdom) McLaren-Mercedes	398
5	(Italy) Racing Bulls-Red Bull Ford	114

- Note: Only the top five positions are included for both sets of standings.
- Competitors marked in bold are the 2026 World Champions.

Previous race: 2026 Mexico City Grand Prix	FIA Formula One World Championship; 2026 season	Next race: 2026 Las Vegas Grand Prix
Previous race: 2025 São Paulo Grand Prix	São Paulo Grand Prix	Next race: 2027 São Paulo Grand Prix
