= Manor MRT07 =

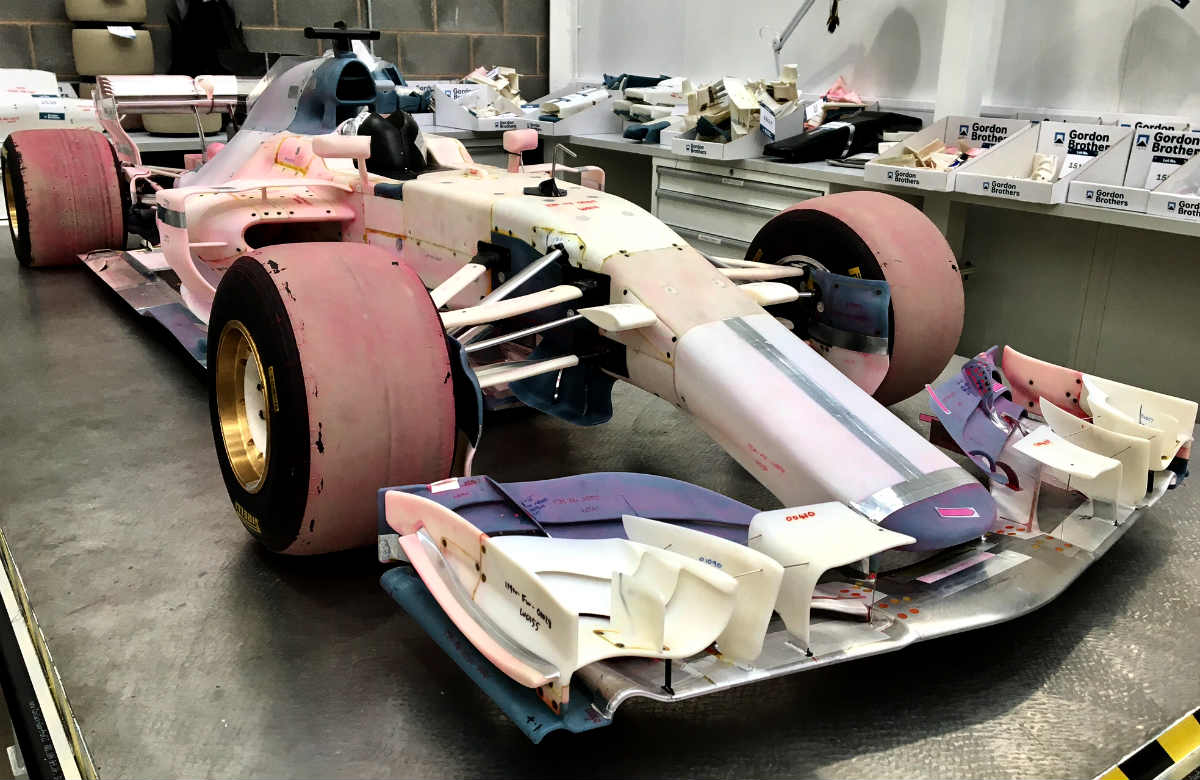
- A 60% scale wind tunnel model of the Manor MRT06
- Category: Formula One
- Constructor: Manor
- Designers: John McQuilliam (Technical Director); Luca Furbatto (Chief Designer); Tim Milne (Head of Aerodynamics)
- Predecessor: MRT05

Technical specifications
- Tyres: Pirelli

Competition history
- Notable entrants: Manor Racing MRT
Races	Wins	Poles	F/Laps
0	0	0	0
- Constructors' Championships: 0
- Drivers' Championships: 0

The Manor MRT07 (also known as the Manor MRT06) was a Formula One car built by Manor Racing, which was to be used in the 2017 Formula One season. The MRT07 was never completely built due to lack of sufficient financial resources.

In 2017, the Manor team came under the control of the administrators of FRP Advisory, and after the announcement of its liquidation, a photo of the car in a smaller size was published. Two racing car chassis were built. Due to the difficult financial situation of the team, at the beginning of January, the team started work on a modification of the previous season's car called MRT05B. The car was tested in the wind tunnel of the Mercedes team, and work on the car was suspended when an investor could not be found to buy the team.

== Context and development ==
=== Acquisition of Marussia F1 ===
At the end of October 2014, the small Russian team Marussia F1 Team, present in Formula 1 since 2012 and the takeover of the Virgin Racing team (founded by Richard Branson in 2010) was placed in administration due to its serious financial difficulties.

On November 7, 2014, Marussia was placed in receivership for lack of a buyer. This procedure paved the way for the dismissal of staff and the sale of the team's assets to settle a debt estimated at 81.4 million euros, owed to 200 creditors including Ferrari, the team's engine manufacturer, and McLaren, which granted technical assistance in the design of its single-seaters.

In December 2014, at an auction, Gene Haas bought back the Banbury factory and the model of the Manor MNR1 destined to compete in the 2015 Formula 1 World Championship.

At the beginning of February 2015, the insolvency administrator, FRP Advisory, then in the process of finding a potential investor who would represent "a viable long-term solution", paid the Fédération internationale de l'automobile (In english: International Automobile Federation) 450,000 euros in Formula 1 World Championship entry fees. On February 19, FRP Advisory terminated the receivership proceedings and canceled the last scheduled auction.

The team, now based at Dinnington, resumed its activities under the name Manor F1 Team and decided to adapt the 2014 Marussia MR03 to the new technical regulations. Manor was bought by Stephen Fitzpatrick, a British businessman and founder of Ovo Energy, who had been in contact with the insolvency administrator since November 2014 to enquire about the team's situation. Fitzpatrick brought in a personal investment of more than €40 million and negotiated with Manor's creditors the spreading of debts as well as a technical partnership with McLaren and the supply of Ferrari engines. He also teamed up with Justin King, former boss of British supermarket chain Sainsbury's, while former Marussia directors Graeme Lowdon and John Booth retained their positions.

=== Struggles as Manor Racing ===
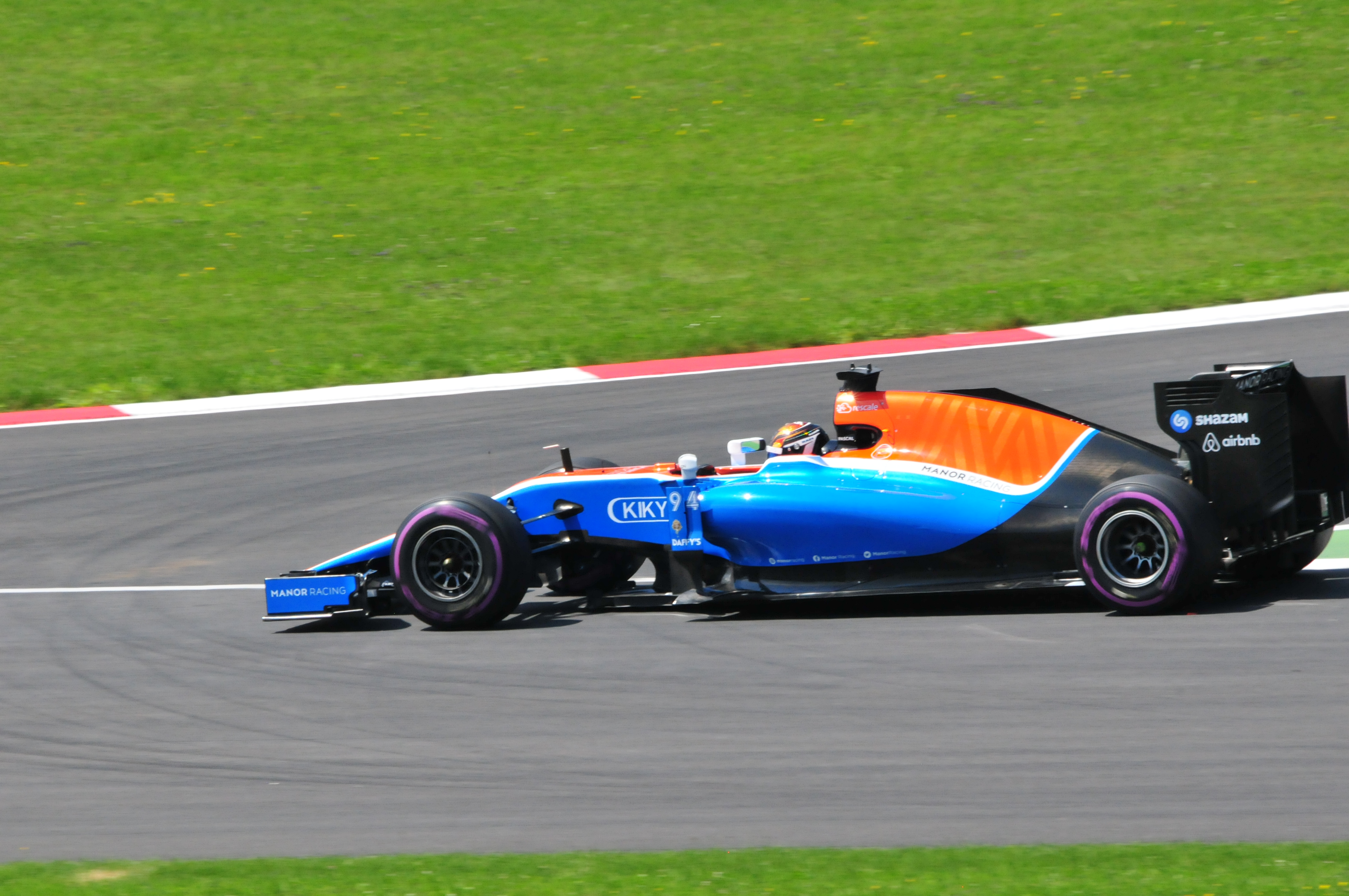
In Austria, Pascal Wehrlein scored the only point in Manor's Formula 1 history.

For its first season in Formula 1, Manor Racing had to contend with a Marussia MR03B and a Ferrari V6 engine whose design dates back to 2014. The team was present in Melbourne for the inaugural round of the season, but failed to start the race due to technical problems during the preparation of the single-seaters.

For the rest of the season, Will Stevens and Roberto Merhi competed anonymously at the back of the grid, more than seven seconds behind the leading teams and three seconds behind their nearest rivals. Merhi puts in his best performance of the season in twelfth place at the British Grand Prix. Nevertheless, Manor forged commercial partnerships with two sponsors, online rental platforms Airbnb and Shazam.

In 2016, Manor presented the new Manor MRT05, powered by a Mercedes-Benz V6 engine, considered the most powerful in the field. At its wheel, Pascal Wehrlein and Rio Haryanto, replaced mid-season by Esteban Ocon, battled at the back of the pack against Sauber and occasionally Renault F1 Team. Wehrlein took his single-seater to twelfth place in qualifying for the Austrian Grand Prix before scoring a tenth-place point, enabling his team to snatch provisional tenth place from Sauber in the Constructors' World Championship.

=== Eleventh in 2016 and loss of prize money ===
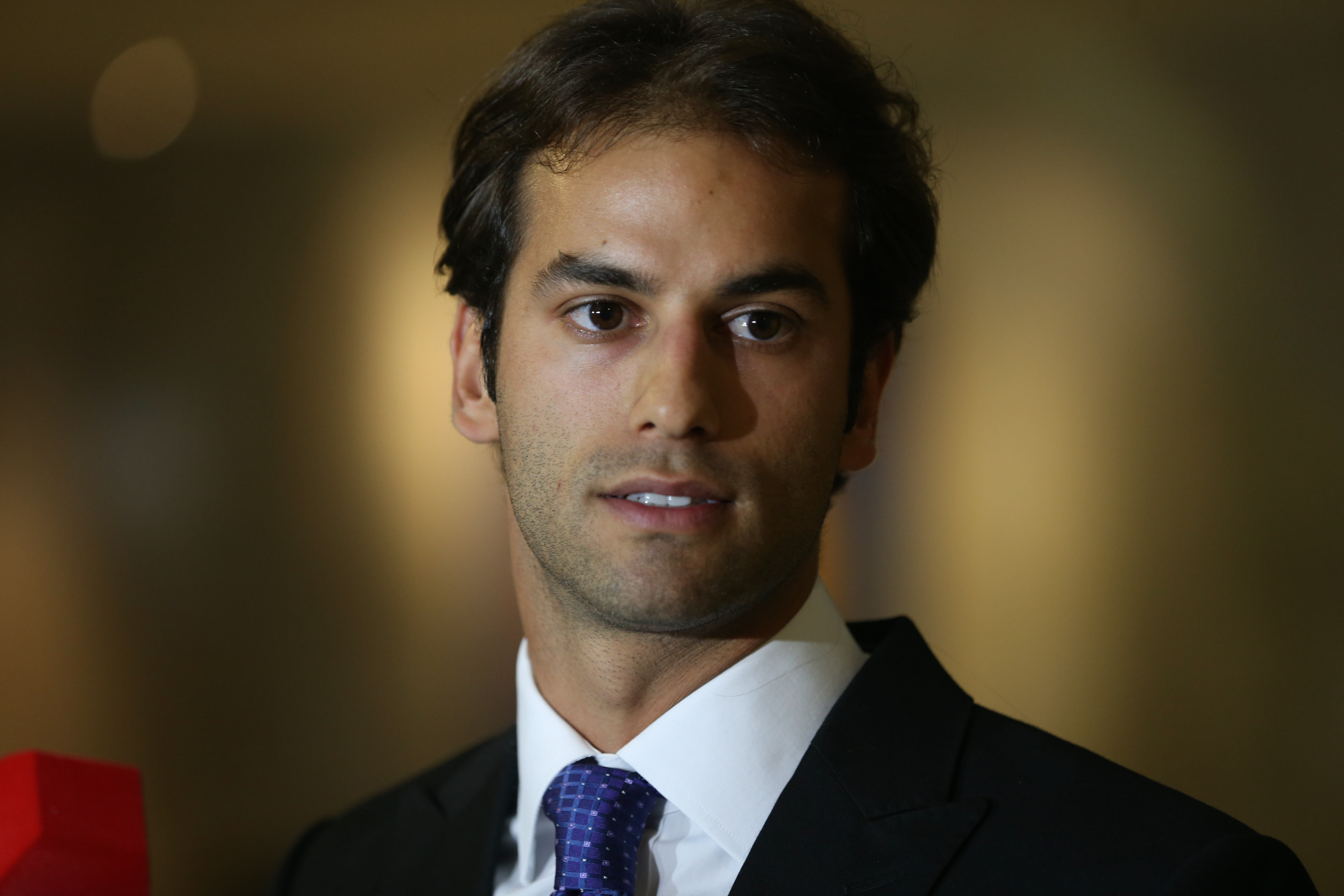
Felipe Nasr's 9th place in Brazil, prevented Manor from finishing tenth in the constructors' championship.

At the Brazilian Grand Prix, the penultimate round of the season, Sauber regained tenth place in the constructors' championship from Manor Racing, thanks to Brazilian Felipe Nasr's ninth-place finish, which earned his team two points. This setback could deprive the British team of the 12 million euros allocated by Formula One Management, since only the top ten teams in the championship benefit from TV rights revenues.

The press claimed that this potential loss of income could bankrupt Manor Racing, which was already in a precarious financial situation, unless it recruited two drivers to compete in the 2017 championship. While Pascal Wehrlein (on loan from Mercedes Grand Prix) was tipped to keep his seat, Esteban Ocon, recruited by Force India, could be replaced by Jordan King, Rio Haryanto, Esteban Gutiérrez or Felipe Nasr, who would provide the team with an additional budget.

Nevertheless, Dave Ryan, Manor's sporting director, insisted that the loss of FOM revenue did not mean bankruptcy of his team, which would attempt to regain its position in the constructors' world championship at the final round in Abu Dhabi. Although Wehrlein and Ocon dominated Nasr and Marcus Ericsson throughout the event, they failed to finish in the top ten, and scored no points; Manor Racing finished eleventh in the constructors' championship.

=== Searching for a buyer ===
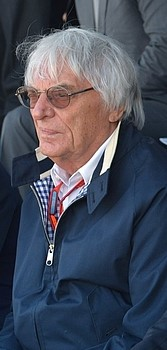
Bernie Ecclestone, Formula 1's financial magnate and a close friend of Tavo Hellmund.

On November 25, 2016, on the sidelines of the Abu Dhabi Grand Prix, Stephen Fitzpatrick announced that for the past six months he had been in negotiations with several potential investors with the aim of raising more funding and enabling the team to grow. The Manor owner, who stated he was ready to welcome a new majority shareholder to his team, claimed to have reached an agreement with an investor, without giving further details.

In December, Tavo Hellmund, an American businessman behind the return of the United States and Mexican Grand Prix, revealed his interest in Manor; he had already shown an interest in taking over Manor back in 2015 and would benefit from financial backing from the State of Texas. Stephen Fitzpatrick would retain a role in the team. However, Bernie Ecclestone, Formula 1's close friend of Tavo Hellmund, believed that the latter did not have the financial resources to take over Manor, and doubted its participation in the 2017 Formula 1 World Championship.

Meanwhile, there were rumors that Manor could be bought by Jagonya Ayam, the Indonesian subsidiary of fast-food chain KFC, which already supported the Campos Racing team in the GP2 Series. Its boss, former Formula 1 driver Adrián Campos, claimed that the company had the potential to enter motorsport's premier discipline. Jagonya Ayam is run by businessman Ricardo Gelael, whose son, Sean Gelael, raced in the GP2 Series with the team and could thus, in the medium term, secure a seat at Manor.

Shortly before Christmas 2016, the press reported that Ron Dennis, the former CEO of McLaren Racing, had been approached by Dave Ryan (Manor's sporting director and a former colleague of Dennis) to buy the team with the help of Chinese investors, who were initially due to take 50% control of McLaren. Another consortium, led by former Marussia F1 Team boss Graeme Lowdon, is also interested in taking over Manor.

On December 30, Manor managing director John McQuilliam resigned in anticipation of the arrival of new management, but stayed on to help find a buyer.

=== Administration and subsequent closure ===
On January 6, 2017, Stephen Fitzpatrick, having failed to reach an agreement with a potential buyer and not wishing to "start a season we're not sure we'll finish", placed Just Racing Services Ltd, the company managing the Manor team, into compulsory administration, jeopardizing its participation in the 2017 championship.

Fitzpatrick, whose objective upon taking over the team in 2015 was to finish the 2016 championship in at least tenth place in the world championship, admitted that the loss of this position at the 2016 Brazilian Grand Prix and the consequent loss of Formula One Management revenue "has cast doubt on our team's ability to complete the 2017 season".

Manor continued negotiations with Tavo Hellmund, Ricardo Gelael and a consortium of Italian investors with a view to taking over the team, while FRP Advisory found a solution to pay the January salaries of the team's staff, extending the deadline to January 27. A potential investor is said to have made a takeover offer, but is demanding a response by January 20 in order to be able to build the Manor MRT07 on schedule and take part in winter testing.

The most serious takeover offer, made by Tavo Hellmund, was twice turned down by Stephen Fitzpatrick. The first, submitted at the end of the 2015 season by Hellmund in association with five American, Canadian and Mexican investors and Anthony Hamilton (Lewis Hamilton's father), proposed investing 25 million euros a year; the Manor owner turned it down to raise the stakes, believing that tenth place in the constructors' world championship was worth 30 million euros. For his second offer, Hellmund planned to team up with Honda or Mercedes-Benz to make Manor their satellite team; the aim was to obtain a supply of engines at reduced prices and a driver on loan. The American businessman was counting on an annual budget of 140 million euros, including 28 million from commercial partnerships, 21 million from a paying driver and 14 to 37 million euros from Formula One Management revenues. Hellmund admitted that the loss of tenth place in the championship at the Brazilian Grand Prix hampered negotiations, all the more so as he saw this as a deadline for the development of the future MRT07.

Negotiations with a potential investor having failed, the compulsory administration, that FRP Advisory announced on January 27 the closure of Manor Racing and the dismissal of 150 of its 212 employees, the others being kept on temporarily in case the team was bought out at the last minute.

== Design of the MRT07 ==
External image
- , revealed by Manor Racing employees on January 27, 2017

On January 27, 2017, the day Manor Racing ceased operations, Joao Correia, one of the team's aerodynamicists, posted on social networks a photograph of a wind tunnel model of the MRT07 at 60% of its actual size and a photograph revealing the existence of two chassis.

The Manor MRT07 (sometimes called MRT06 in the references), designed by John McQuilliam, Luca Furbatto, Nikolas Tombazis and Tim Milne, is an evolution of the Manor MRT05, which itself evolved from the Manor MNR1, a single-seater designed by Marussia F1 Team for the 2015 season before it went bankrupt. The MRT07's development began in spring 2016, and its final wind tunnel tests took place in December 2016.

=== Chassis and suspension ===
This single-seater complied with the 2017 technical regulations: aerodynamic downforce was increased by 25% and the single-seater had a minimum mass of 728 kilograms, seven of which could be freely distributed to the front or rear of the single-seater, reaching 330 and 391 kilograms respectively. As the MRT05 was 30 kilograms under the authorized weight in 2016, the MRT07's parts were larger to enable it to reach the legal weight.

The MRT07 featured a carbon-fiber monocoque chassis designed to house a Mercedes-AMG F1 M08 EQ Power+ turbocharged V6 engine, with a displacement of 1,600 cm3 and revving at 15,000 rpm. This block was to be cooled by a liquid-air cooler located between the fuel tank and the engine, a practice inspired by that used by Mercedes Grand Prix since 2014 with its Mercedes AMG F1 W05. The air intakes on the pontoons were reduced but wider than those on the MRT05, and were oriented towards the rear at a 15-degree angle because the Mercedes-AMG engine required less cooling air. The asymmetrical rear of the chassis had a small opening on the left and a large one on the right to allow engine cooling. The airbox above the cockpit was similar to that of the MRT05, divided into two parts, one feeding the transmission, the other sending air to the engine. The chassis featured electronic elements previously located in the MRT05's pontoons to improve the aerodynamics of the single-seater's sides.

The Manor MRT07 featured front and rear suspensions designed in-house, whereas the team previously subcontracted this part to Williams Grand Prix Engineering. The front suspensions, larger than in 2016, featured a traditional architecture with two torsion bars and a shock absorber to counteract roll. These components were attached to a metal part.

=== Aerodynamics ===
The Manor MRT07 had a conventional build, but the team had planned to experiment with many new aerodynamic parts. Six different noses were designed for the MRT07. The nose favored by the engineers had the minimum length imposed by the technical regulations: shortened in the manner of the Mercedes AMG F1 W07 Hybrid, it reinforced the Venturi effect under the muzzle. While very similar to the MRT05, the MRT07's nose was partly inspired by that of the 2016 Haas VF-16. The team had also imagined other types of nose, including a conventional thumb-shaped one.

The front spoiler, which had been extensively reworked compared to that of the MRT05, was made up of three corrugated outer upper fins to direct airflow around the front tires and avoid aerodynamic turbulence generated by tire rotation. These fins, inspired by those on the 2011 Renault R31, were curved upwards at their tips to generate a Y250 vortex that sends airflow towards the center and rear of the car; this solution was carried over from the 2014 Williams FW36 and Caterham CT05. This vortex was reinforced by inverted L-shaped duck plans, like the Mercedes AMG F1 W04 from 2013. The fin on the side of the front spoiler, curved outwards, featured a flow reverser to direct the airflow around the tire to limit drag.

The side deflectors under the car's pontoons featured three notches, similar to those on the 2016 Williams FW38, designed to reduce air resistance and direct airflow towards the rear of the single-seater. The deflectors allowed the orientation of the radiators and coolers to be adjusted to improve the efficiency of the airflow inside the single-seater. The pontoons, equipped with a blade running from the cockpit along its contour and ending some ten centimeters from the flat bottom, were very wide towards the front and narrower at the air outlets, to expose the flat bottom. The flat bottom featured two L-shaped slots in front of the rear tires to direct airflow towards the diffuser.

At the rear, the Manor MRT07 featured a shark fin that directed air towards the rear wing to generate more downforce at the rear and thus more stability in fast corners. Near the rear brakes, small fins generated vortices to reduce aerodynamic turbulence caused by the rear tires. The rear spoiler, lower and more inclined than that of the MRT05, as stipulated by technical regulations, was pierced by slots to draw airflow inwards. It was supported by twin pylons for added stability. Finally, the rear wing featured four side louvers oriented at 25 degrees, as on the 2016 Toro Rosso STR11, to displace the vortex generated on the wing tips and improve airflow to the DRS movable flap. Finally, the DRS actuator was smaller than that of the MRT05 to avoid disturbing the airflow.

=== Failed engagement attempt and auction ===
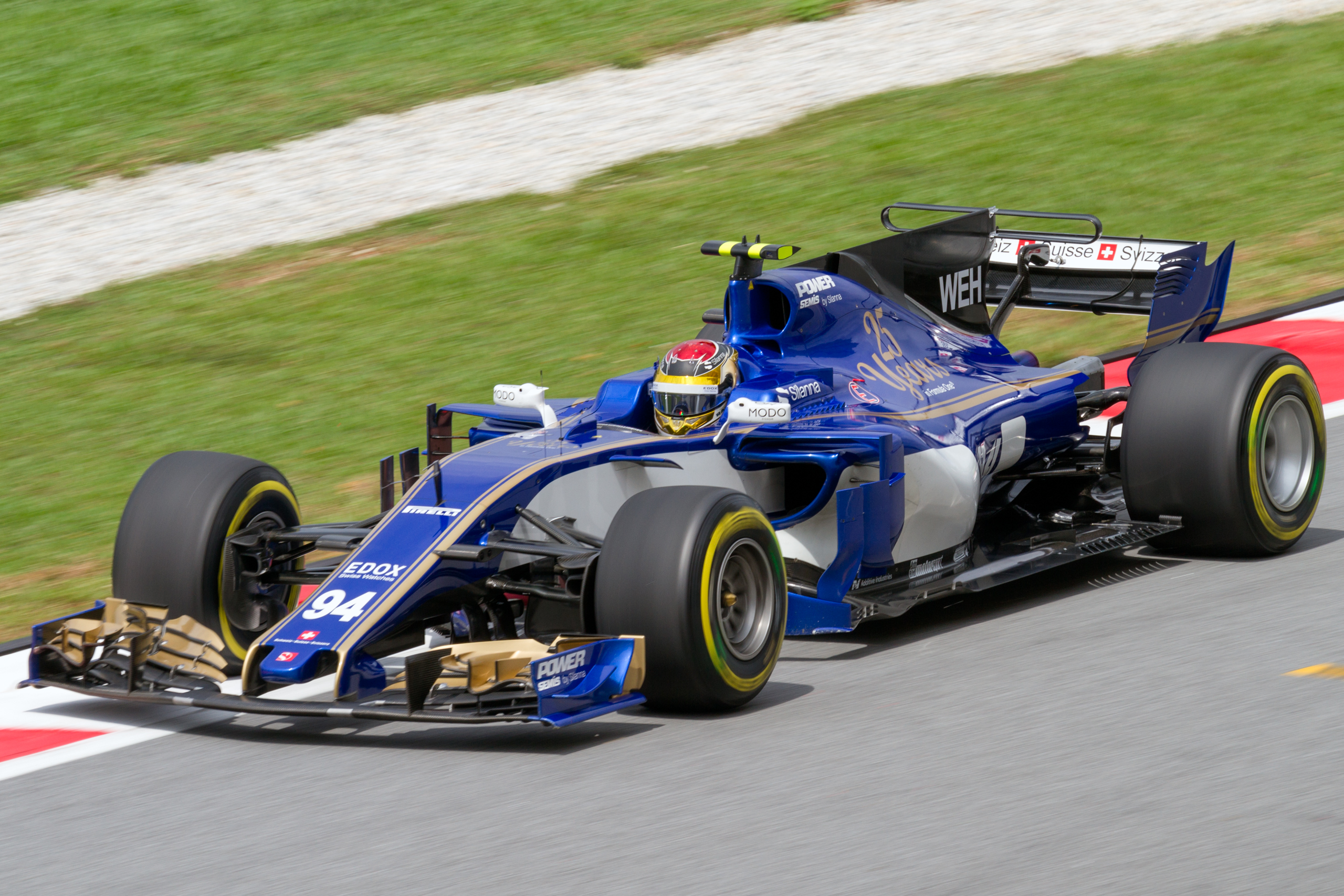
Specialists believe that the Sauber C36 is less efficient than the Manor MRT07 would have been.

In February 2017, the trade press reported that Ricardo Gelael, the boss of Team Jagonya Ayam, withdrew his takeover offer made a few days before Manor Racing went bankrupt, as he was unaware of the extent of the debts. However, he would still be interested in a takeover if the sale price was to be revised downwards due to the cessation of activity. In the event of a takeover, Manor planned to enter Formula 1 from the Spanish Grand Prix, the fifth round of the championship, initially with the 2016 Manor MRT05 chassis.

On March 1, the Fédération Internationale de l'Automobile (In English: International Automobile Federation) published the final entry list for the 2017 championship, on which Manor Racing did not appear: the British team, which had failed to find a buyer, withdrew its entry application, and disappeared for good.

At the beginning of May, Luca Furbatto, the lead designer of the Manor MRT07, revealed that Stephen Fitzpatrick had ordered parts production to cease at the end of November 2016. This decision was not appreciated by potential investors, as it no longer guaranteed the possibility of fielding the MRT07 from the first round of the championship, in Australia. He confirmed that Manor's plan, as soon as it went into compulsory administration, was to field an MRT05 adapted to the new technical regulations for the first three Grands Prix of the season, when 90% of the MRT07's parts were ready. Furbatto also asserted that this single-seater had the potential to fight in the middle of the grid and score points, even though he believed it would have given back three seconds per lap to the best cars in the field. The press stated that the British car would have outperformed its main rival, the Sauber C36: the Swiss car is powered by a 2016 Ferrari Tipo 061 V6 engine.

In mid-May 2017, Manor's assets were auctioned by auctioneers Gordon Brothers over four days to pay off some of the creditors. 4,000 items are up for sale, including four Marussia MR03B and Manor MRT05 chassis and the wind tunnel scale model of the Manor MRT07, in an attempt to cover more than €3.5 million in debts to fifty creditors, most of whom were small suppliers already affected by the bankruptcy of Marussia F1 Team and Caterham F1 Team at the end of the 2014 season. The assets up for auction are estimated at 2.9 million euros.

The FIA returned to Manor the sum of $522,322 paid in entry fees for the 2017 championship, to help the team clear its debts.

== See also ==
- Toyota TF110
- Honda RA099
- Brawn BGP 001 (formerly known as the Honda RA109)

== Bibliography ==
- Collins, Sam (June 2017), "To the Manor stillborn", Racecar Engineering, vol. 27, no. 6, pp. 26–32
