= Josh Peckett =

British engineer

- Education: University of Sheffield
- Occupation: Engineer
- Employer: Alpine F1 Team
- Title: Race engineer

Josh Peckett is a British Formula One and motorsports engineer. He is currently the race engineer to Pierre Gasly at the Alpine F1 Team.

== Career ==
Peckett graduated from the University of Sheffield in 2011 with a degree in Mechanical Engineering. He began his motorsport career as a Performance Engineer with the GP2 Series team iSport International, working with drivers including Sam Bird, Marcus Ericsson and Jolyon Palmer. He moved into Formula One in 2013 with the Marussia F1 Team, remaining with the Banbury outfit through its transition into Manor Racing. In 2015 he served as Race Engineer to Will Stevens, before working with Pascal Wehrlein in 2016.

In 2017 Peckett joined the Enstone-based Renault F1 Team on the Race Support Team. He was appointed Performance Engineer to Nico Hülkenberg in 2019 and continued in the same role with Esteban Ocon in 2020, as the team transitioned from Renault to the rebranded Alpine F1 Team for 2021. Peckett was promoted to Race Engineer for the 2021 season, engineering Ocon to his maiden Formula One victory at the 2021 Hungarian Grand Prix. He remained Ocon's race engineer through the end of the 2024 season, overseeing race execution, set-up direction and performance development across multiple campaigns. He also engineered Jack Doohan at the 2024 Abu Dhabi Grand Prix, deputising after Ocon's early departure from the preceding round.

For 2025, Peckett moved to the opposite side of the Alpine garage to become Race Engineer to Pierre Gasly, continuing in a senior trackside role responsible for car performance, race strategy input and overall execution.
