= Manor MNR1 =

- Category: Formula One
- Constructor: Marussia
- Designer: Luca Furbatto (chief designer)
- Predecessor: MR03B
- Successor: Manor MRT05

Technical specifications
- Tyres: Pirelli

Competition history
- Notable entrants: Manor Marussia
Races	Wins	Poles	F/Laps
0	0	0	0
- Constructors' Championships: 0
- Drivers' Championships: 0

Manor MNR1 (also known as the Marussia MR04) is Formula 1 car, designed for the 2015 season by Luca Furbatto for Manor Marussia.

== History ==
During the 2014 season the Marussia team collapsed. Despite this fact, Manor, from Marussia, appeared on the starting list of the 2015 season.

In November 2014, the 2015 Manor car design was revealed, designed by former Toro Rosso employee Luca Furbatto. This model was based on its predecessor, the Marussia MR03, and was only adapted to the regulations for the 2015 season. This was to reduce costs.

In compliance with regulations, Manor changed the shape of the car's front nose. The front part of the body was also lowered. The front and rear spoilers have been improved.

At the end of 2014 the model design was purchased by Gene Haas, who plans to introduce his own team to Formula 1 in 2016.

Ultimately Manor started in the 2015 season under the name Marussia, fielding the MR03B model.
