= Marussia MR03 =

2014–15 Formula One motor racing car

- Jules Bianchi driving the MR03 at the 2014 British Grand Prix
- Category: Formula One
- Constructor: Marussia
- Designers: Dave Greenwood (Chief Engineer); John McQuilliam (Chief Designer); Rob Taylor (Deputy Chief Designer); Richard Taylor (Head of Aerodynamics)
- Predecessor: Marussia MR02
- Successor: Manor MRT05

Technical specifications
- Chassis: Carbon-fibre composite
- Suspension (front): Carbon-fibre wishbone and pushrod suspension elements operating inboard torsion bar and damper system
- Suspension (rear): Carbon-fibre wishbone and pullrod suspension elements operating inboard torsion bar and damper system
- Engine: Ferrari 059/3 1.6 L (98 cu in) V6, turbo
- Transmission: Semi-automatic, sequential 8 forward gears, 1 reverse gear
- Weight: 691 kg (1,523 lb) (2014); 702 kg (1,548 lb) (2015)
- Fuel: Shell V-Power
- Lubricants: Valvoline Racing Synthetic VR1 Motor Oil 5W-40
- Tyres: Pirelli P Zero (dry), Cinturato (wet)

Competition history
- Notable entrants: Marussia F1 Team; Manor Marussia F1 Team (2015)
- Notable drivers: 4. (United Kingdom) Max Chilton; 17. (France) Jules Bianchi; 28. (United Kingdom) Will Stevens; 53. (United States) Alexander Rossi; 98. (Spain) Roberto Merhi
- Debut: 2014 Australian Grand Prix
- Last event: 2014 Russian Grand Prix (MR03); 2015 Abu Dhabi Grand Prix (MR03B)
Races	Wins	Podiums	Poles	F/Laps
35	0	0	0	0

The Marussia MR03 is a Formula One racing car designed and built by the Marussia F1 Team. It competed for part of the 2014 Formula One season, before the team went into administration in November 2014. Following the team's resurrection as Manor Marussia F1, the car raced as the MR03B after modifications were made to enable it to compete in, and meet the regulations in place for, 2015.

This was the first Formula One car to run on Valvoline lubricant since the Lotus 91 in 1982 despite the MR03's fuel being supplied by Shell V-Power.

== Marussia MR03 ==
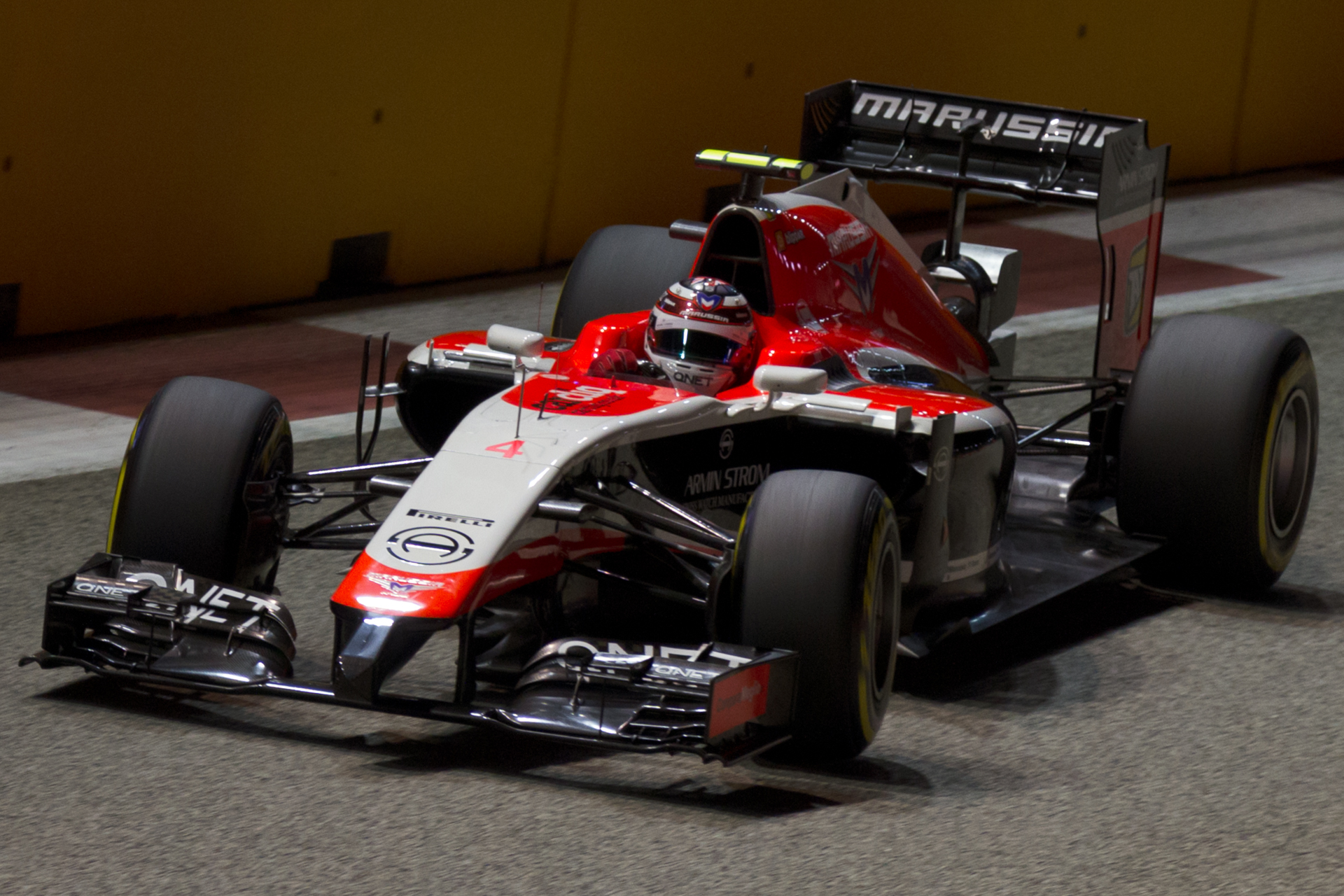
Max Chilton driving the MR03 at the Singapore Grand Prix.

The MR03 was driven in 2014 by Jules Bianchi and Max Chilton, both of whom returned to the team for a second consecutive season. The car was the first car designed by Marussia to use an engine built by Ferrari, the 059/3. In general terms, and compared to previous years' cars, the MR03 performed better relative to the opposition. In addition, with this car, Bianchi recorded his and Marussia's first points ever in Formula One at the Monaco Grand Prix.

As a result of the serious crash that involved Bianchi at the Japanese Grand Prix – and which caused his death nine months later – for the subsequent and inaugural Russian Grand Prix the team decided to only race with Chilton. This decision was made after the team's initial registration of their reserve driver, American rookie Alexander Rossi.

After entering into administration in late October 2014, the team did not attend a race event for the first time in its history resulting, therefore, in the MR03 not being fielded at the United States Grand Prix. With the team folding in November 2014, the MR03 did not further participate in the 2014 Formula One season.

== Marussia MR03B ==
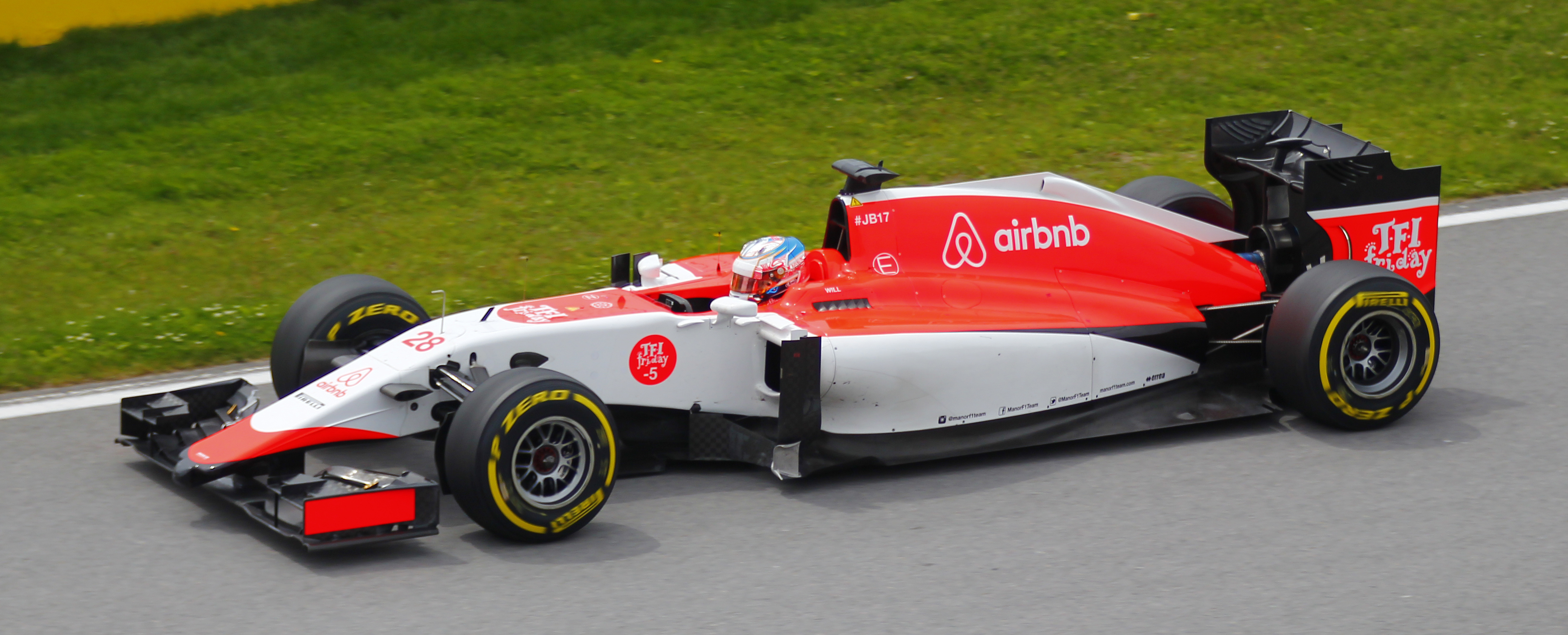
Will Stevens driving the MR03B at the Canadian Grand Prix.

Following special FIA permission sought by the Manor-Marussia team in February 2015, the car was modified into the MR03B after basic modifications to meet 2015 regulations, pending a new chassis being built – that ultimately never materialised. The revised car differed most notably in the nosecone area and had to weigh more, from 691 kg (1,523 lb) to 702 kg (1,548 lb), due to new technical specifications in 2015.

Will Stevens and Roberto Merhi were contracted to drive, but the late rescue package meant that the car arrived at the opening round of the season without any form of testing. Ultimately, they did not qualify for the race, as they had not participated in qualifying or any session during the weekend. This was due mostly in part to the team's computers being wiped clean of data in the days leading up to the auction; the oversight went completely undetected by the entire team until the days before the Grand Prix when the car was being assembled in Australia. The team was cleared of any malicious wrongdoing by the FIA after a hearing, and resolved their software issues in time for the next event.

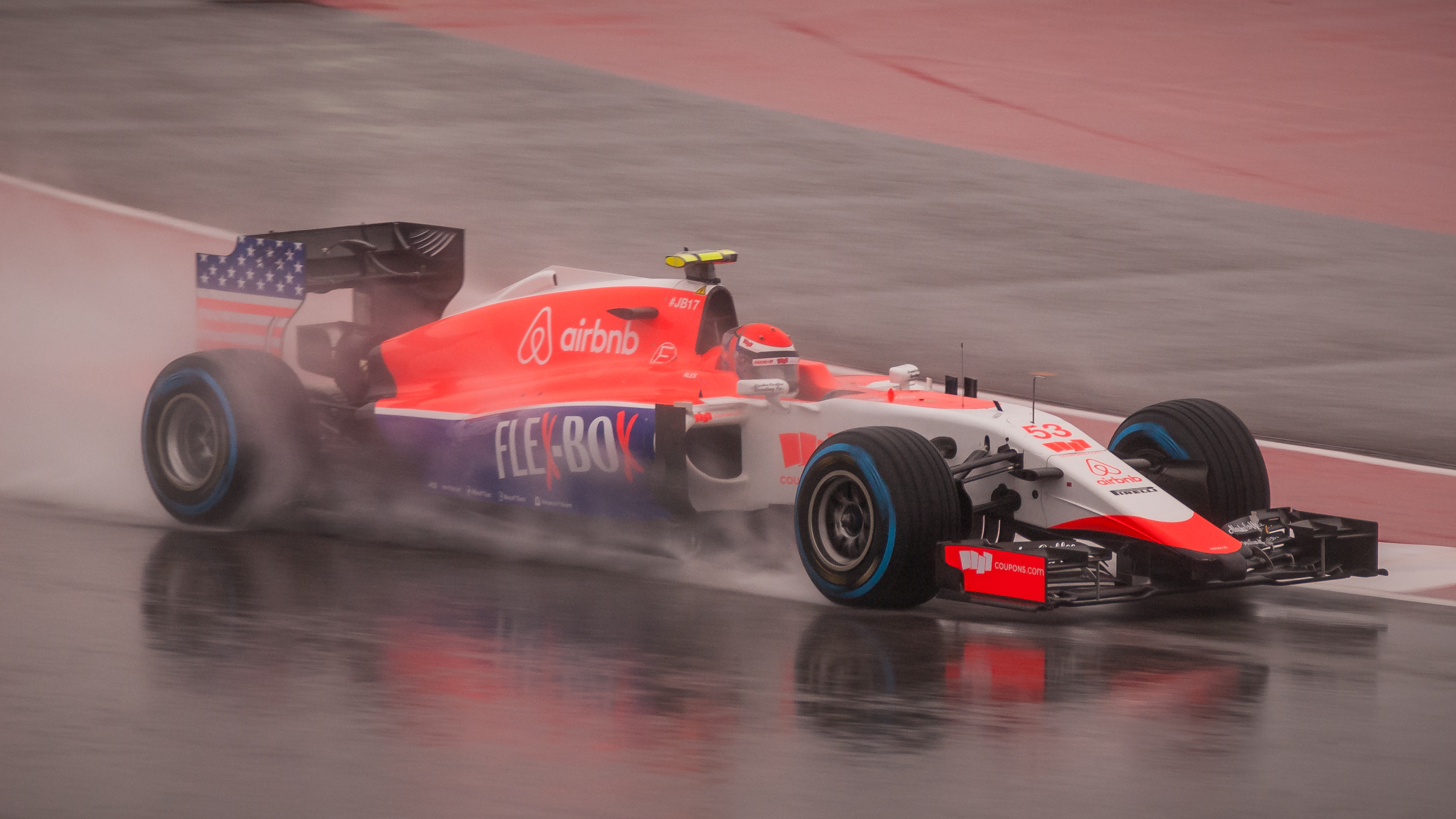
Alexander Rossi driving the reliveried MR03B at the United States Grand Prix.

The MR03B also received its first technical updates at the British Grand Prix.

Rossi replaced Merhi for five out of the last seven races of the season, competing in the races that did not clash with his main campaign, in the GP2 Series.

== Sponsorship and livery ==
In 2014, the car's livery remained the same as in the previous season: black, featuring a wide red and white stripe along the nose and the top of the engine cover. The car was entirely devoid of sponsors, save for the logo of Marussia Motors, which gave the team its name. Following the events of the 2014 Japanese Grand Prix, as a further sign of respect and support, the hashtag "#JB17" was added to the sides of the air intake and the chassis, being a reference to Bianchi's initials and race number; this inscription remained on the cars even after the driver's passing in 2015.

In 2015, the team adopted a white and red livery. Initially with only the Erreà sponsor on the rear wing. During the Canadian Grand Prix and British Grand Prix, the car received new liveries for use for the remainder of the 2015 season thanks to new sponsors Airbnb and Flex-Box, respectively an accommodation rental company and a shipping and storage container manufacturer and supplier. Following this second agreement, the sides of the race cars were painted blue. At the team’s home race in Britain, the names of all team employees were also displayed on the side of the monocoque.

At the United States Grand Prix, the MR03B featured a further revised livery – adding the stars and the stripes from the flag of the United States – and a new sponsor Coupons.com, which was introduced with Rossi on his third race for the team.

== Complete Formula One results ==
(key)

Year	Entrant	Chassis	Engine	Tyres	Drivers	1	2	3	4	5	6	7	8	9	10	11	12	13	14	15	16	17	18	19	Pts	WCC
2014	Marussia F1 Team	MR03	Ferrari 059/3	P		AUS	MAL	BHR	CHN	ESP	MON	CAN	AUT	GBR	GER	HUN	BEL	ITA	SIN	JPN	RUS	USA	BRA	ABU‡	2	9th
2014	Marussia F1 Team	MR03	Ferrari 059/3	P	Max Chilton	13	15	13	19	19	14	Ret	17	16	17	16	16	Ret	17	18	Ret				2	9th
2014	Marussia F1 Team	MR03	Ferrari 059/3	P	Jules Bianchi	NC	Ret	16	17	18	9	Ret	15	14	15	15	18†	18	16	20†					2	9th
2015	Manor Marussia F1 Team	MR03B	Ferrari 059/3	P		AUS	MAL	CHN	BHR	ESP	MON	CAN	AUT	GBR	HUN	BEL	ITA	SIN	JPN	RUS	USA	MEX	BRA	ABU	0	10th
2015	Manor Marussia F1 Team	MR03B	Ferrari 059/3	P	Will Stevens	DNP	DNS	15	16	17	17	17	Ret	13	16†	16	15	15	19	14	Ret	16	17	18	0	10th
2015	Manor Marussia F1 Team	MR03B	Ferrari 059/3	P	Roberto Merhi	DNP	15	16	17	18	16	Ret	14	12	15	15	16			13				19	0	10th
2015	Manor Marussia F1 Team	MR03B	Ferrari 059/3	P	Alexander Rossi													14	18		12	15	18		0	10th

† Driver failed to finish the race, but was classified as they had completed greater than 90% of the race distance.
‡ Teams and drivers scored double points at the 2014 Abu Dhabi Grand Prix.
