= Manor MRT05 =

Racing automobile

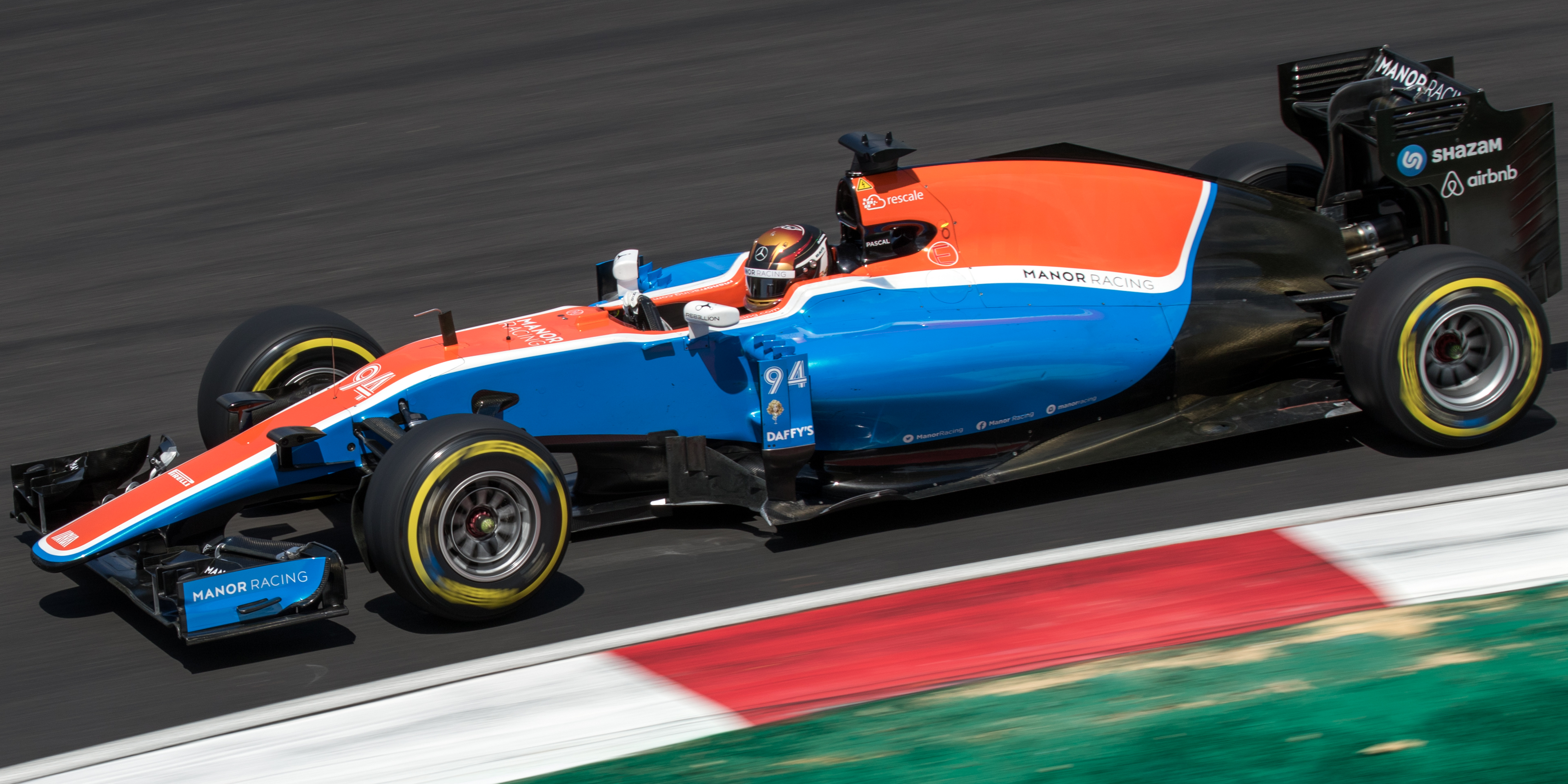
- The Manor MRT05, driven by Pascal Wehrlein, during the Malaysian Grand Prix
- Category: Formula One
- Constructor: Manor
- Designers: John McQuilliam (Technical Director); Luca Furbatto (Chief Designer); Tim Milne (Head of Aerodynamics)
- Predecessor: Marussia MR03B
- Successor: MRT07 (never raced)

Technical specifications
- Chassis: Manor Racing moulded composite with alumunium honeycomb core
- Suspension (front): Manor Racing full composite. Pushrod to rockers with torsion springs and inboard damping
- Suspension (rear): Williams Advanced Engineering
- Engine: Mercedes PU106C Hybrid Turbo V6
- Electric motor: Mercedes PU106C Hybrid Motor Generator Unit–Kinetic (MGU-K) Mercedes PU106C Hybrid Motor Generator Unit–Heat (MGU-H)
- Transmission: Semi-automatic Sequential Eight Speed Forward + One reverse
- Battery: Lithium-ion batteries solution
- Weight: MWR: 702 kg (1,547.6 lb)
- Fuel: Petronas Primax
- Lubricants: Petronas Syntium & Tutela
- Brakes: Discs and pads, calipers.
- Tyres: Pirelli P Zero (Dry/Slick); Pirelli Cinturato (Wet/Treaded)

Competition history
- Notable entrants: Manor Racing
- Notable drivers: 31. (France) Esteban Ocon; 88. (Indonesia) Rio Haryanto; 94. (Germany) Pascal Wehrlein
- Debut: 2016 Australian Grand Prix
- Last event: 2016 Abu Dhabi Grand Prix
Races	Wins	Podiums	Poles	F/Laps
21	0	0	0	0

The Manor MRT05 is a Formula One racing car designed by Manor Racing for use in the 2016 Formula One season.

== Drivers ==
Ahead of the season, Pascal Wehrlein and Rio Haryanto were announced as the 2016 race team drivers. Ahead of the Belgian Grand Prix, Esteban Ocon replaced Haryanto. Alexander Rossi and Jordan King were test and development drivers.

Manor Racing Team Drivers – 2016
Driver	Role	Prior to 2016	Notes
(Germany) Pascal Wehrlein	Driver	DTM 2015 Champion	
(Indonesia) Rio Haryanto	Driver	GP2	Released from the team after the 2016 Hungarian Grand Prix
(France) Esteban Ocon	Driver	GP3 2015 Champion	Signed for the team from the 2016 Belgian Grand Prix
(United Kingdom) Jordan King	Development Driver	GP2	Continued with GP2 racing in 2016
(United States) Alexander Rossi	Reserve Driver	Indycar	Continued with Indycar racing in 2016

== Design and development ==
The MRT05 was launched at the Circuit de Catalunya in Barcelona on 22 February 2016 in pre-season testing. It was the first new car for Manor since 2014, as the MRT04 had been a development of the previous years car. The MRT05 featured Mercedes AMG engines in a change from Ferrari. The team developing the car had changed significantly, with Dave Ryan (McLaren Racing), Pat Fry (Scuderia Ferrari) and Nikolas Tombazis (Scuderia Ferrari) joining the technical team developing the MRT05. The MRT05 was designed largely from scratch as the team had lost their wind tunnel model, the MRN1, when the team collapsed at the end of 2014 and their original factory and wind tunnel were occupied by the new Haas F1 Team.

During the eight day pre season test in Spain, the MRT05 ran a total of 484 laps/2253km. Wehrlein's aggregate times placed him 19th fastest, whilst Haryanto was last in 23rd 3.31 seconds off the fastest pace.

== Racing history ==
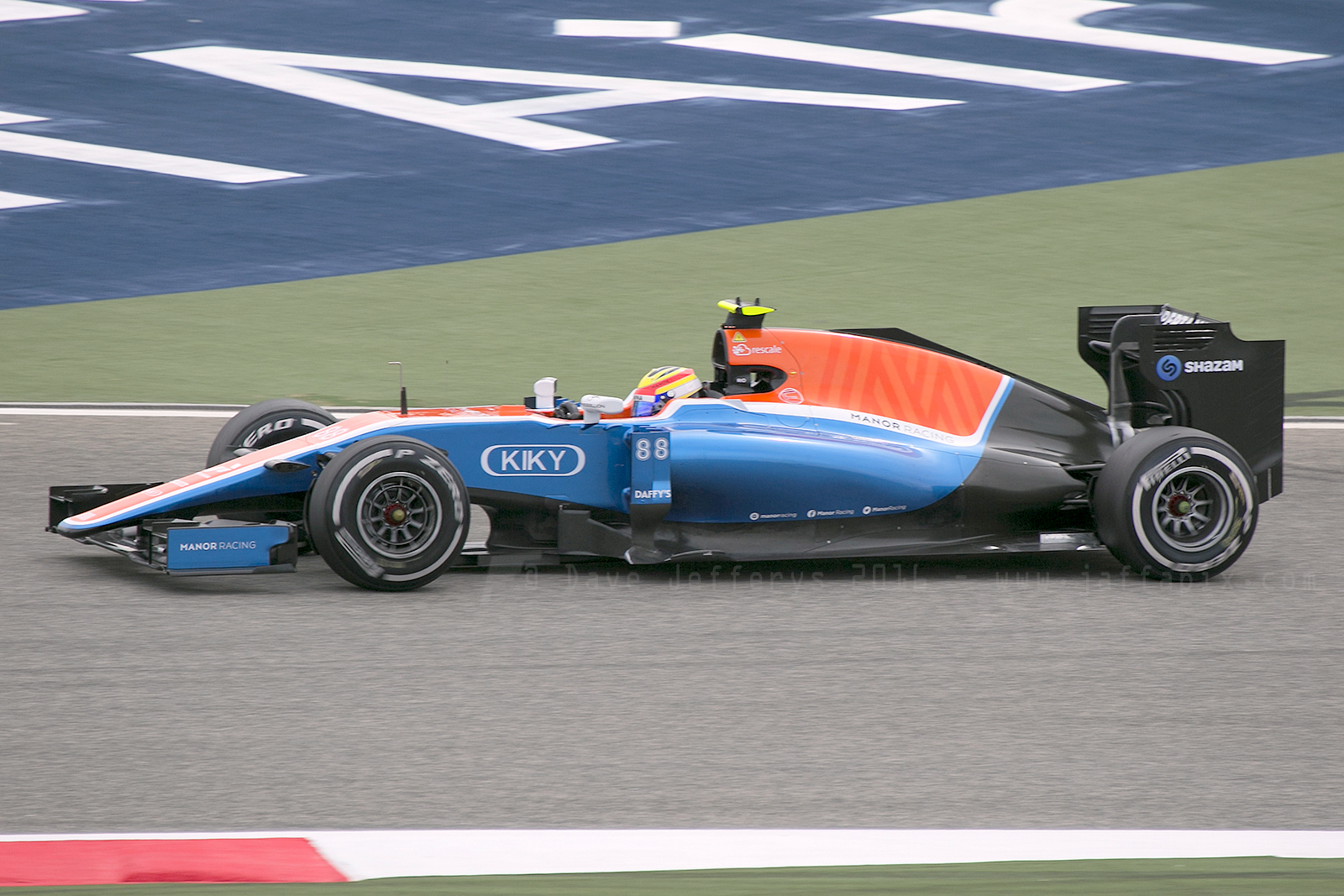
Haryanto driving the MRT05 at the Bahrain Grand Prix

During the first race of the season in Australia, Rio Haryanto retired due to a drivetrain problem, while Pascal Wehrlein finished in sixteenth place. At the next race, in Bahrain, Wehrlein was one place away from reaching Q2 for the first time in his career, qualifying sixteenth. Haryanto finished the race, a career first, in 17th place.

At the Austrian Grand Prix, Wehrlein achieved a 12th place qualifying position, the highest achieved by the team. Wehrlein also scored the team's first ever point and its best result to date by finishing 10th in the race.

Before the Belgian Grand Prix, Rio Haryanto was demoted to reserve driver, and with it sponsor Pertamina withdrew support from the team. For the remaining nine races of the season, he was replaced by Esteban Ocon.

At the end of a Brazilian Grand Prix, which was held in adverse conditions, Sauber gained two points, putting them ahead of Manor in the championship, costing the team £30 million in prize money. At the final round of the season at Abu Dhabi, the team did not score points and therefore finished 11th and last in the Constructors Championship. This lack of prize money would ultimately lead the team to administration and closure in January 2017, therefore making the MRT05 the final Manor F1 car that raced.

== Livery and sponsorship ==
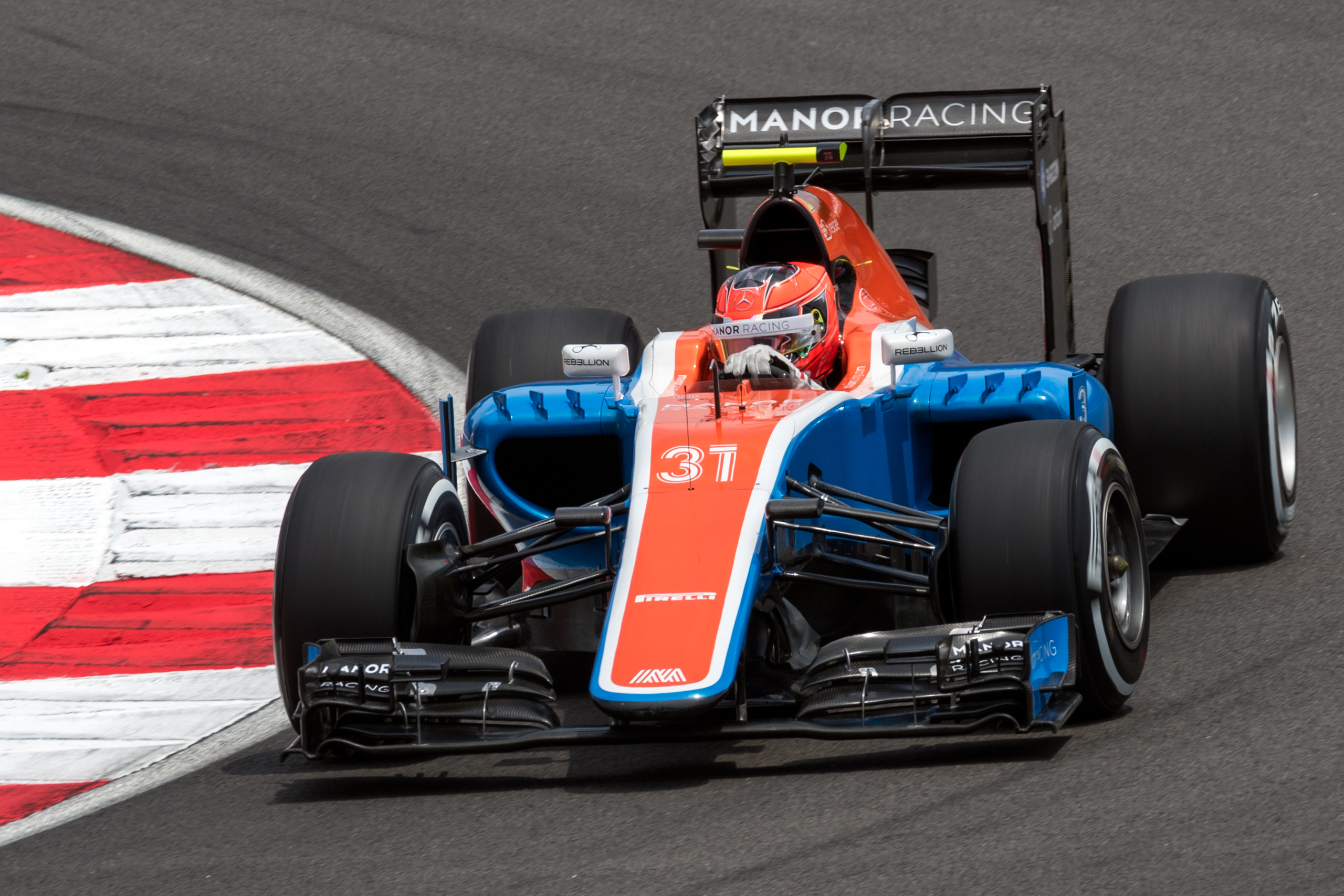
Following Haryanto's demotion, Pertamina sponsorship was removed from the car (pictured is Ocon's car during the Malaysian Grand Prix)

The Manor team had a predominantly red and blue livery with flashes of white. Pertamina were the dominant sponsor, with logos on the nose and rear wing of the car – until their support was withdrawn during the season. Shazam backed the team and had branding on the rear wing end plates. Daffy's Gin sponsored the team ahead of the Australian Grand Prix. In May, Airbnb returned to sponsorship of the team and ahead of the final race of the year, Deliveroo joined as sponsors.

== Complete Formula One results ==
(key) (results in bold indicate pole position; results in italics indicate fastest lap)

Year	Entrant	Engine	Tyres	Drivers	Grands Prix																					Points	WCC
Year	Entrant	Engine	Tyres	Drivers	AUS	BHR	CHN	RUS	ESP	MON	CAN	EUR	AUT	GBR	HUN	GER	BEL	ITA	SIN	MAL	JPN	USA	MEX	BRA	ABU	Points	WCC
2016	Manor Racing MRT	Mercedes PU106C Hybrid	**P**	Rio Haryanto	Ret	17	21	Ret	17	15	19	18	16	Ret	21	20										**1**	**11th**
2016	Manor Racing MRT	Mercedes PU106C Hybrid	**P**	Pascal Wehrlein	16	13	18	18	16	14	17	Ret	10	Ret	19	17	Ret	Ret	16	15	22	17	Ret	15	14	**1**	**11th**
2016	Manor Racing MRT	Mercedes PU106C Hybrid	**P**	Esteban Ocon													16	18	18	16	21	18	21	12	13	**1**	**11th**
