= Dave Ryan (motorsport) =

New Zealand sporting director (born 1954)

- Ryan pictured on the podium at the 2008 Chinese Grand Prix
- Born: 12 May 1954 (age 72); New Zealand
- Occupations: Racing Director, Manor Racing

David James Ryan (born 12 May 1954 in New Zealand) is the former sporting director of the McLaren Formula One team and former racing director of the Manor Formula One team. He spent 35 years with McLaren until he left in April 2009 and set up VonRyan Racing to compete in GT racing.

== Career ==
A former speedway racer, Ryan left New Zealand for the UK in his late teens and joined McLaren as a mechanic. He worked on the McLaren M23 of Jochen Mass and with James Hunt when he won the World Championship in 1976. After nearly a decade as a mechanic, Ryan was appointed to the role of Chief Mechanic for the team, before taking over the role of factory team manager. In 1990 he took on more responsibility as team manager looking after the race and test team activities on track and at the factory in Woking. Then 18 years later, he was appointed as sporting director with more responsibilities, however he was suspended prior to the 2009 Malaysian Grand Prix after an incident concerning a yellow flag situation during the 2009 Australian Grand Prix. During his time with the team he worked with the likes of Formula One champions Ayrton Senna, Alain Prost, Niki Lauda, Mika Häkkinen and Lewis Hamilton and the team won 151 races, 12 Drivers' Championships and eight Constructors' Championships.

In 2009 he left the team and set up his own outfit – VonRyan Racing. In 2015, racing two McLaren 650GTs, the team won three races in the Blancpain Endurance and British GT series.

In November 2015, Ryan was appointed to the position of Racing Director of the Manor F1 Team which eventually folded in January 2017. He was present at the Abu Dhabi Grand Prix, the final event of the season, working with the team.

He is now Racing Director of W Series, the new single-seater championship for female drivers only.
