= Dave Greenwood (engineer) =

British engineer

- Born: David Greenwood; 30 March 1978 (age 47)
- Occupation: Engineer
- Title: Alpine F1 Team Racing director

David Greenwood (born 30 March 1978) is a British Formula One engineer. He is the Racing Director at the Alpine Formula One Team.

== Career ==
Greenwood graduated from Oxford Brookes University with a degree in mechanical engineering. He began his Formula One career with the British American Racing team, spending over four years as a Vehicle Dynamicist at the Brackley-based operation. He later joined Renault F1 Team as a race engineer - working with Giancarlo Fisichella and Fernando Alonso.

He left to join the fledgling Virgin Racing in 2010, where he worked as a Race Engineer to Timo Glock. Following the team’s transition to Marussia F1 Team, Greenwood was promoted to Chief Engineer, overseeing the car’s setup, performance, and trackside engineering operations. He was then recruited by Scuderia Ferrari to work as a race engineer for Kimi Räikkönen from 2015 to 2017.

After leaving Formula One, he became Technical Director of United Autosports, where he applied his F1 experience to the team’s World Endurance Championship programme. During his tenure, the team achieved class victories at the 24 Hours of Le Mans and secured the WEC Teams’ Championship title.

Most recently, Greenwood served as Head of Special Projects at Hitech Grand Prix, where he led the engineering group responsible for the team’s bid to enter the Formula One. He joined Alpine as Racing Director at the start of 2025, leading the team at the race track and representing the team officially as 'team principal' for administrative purposes as team principal Flavio Briatore is not technically an employee of the team.
