= Manor Racing =

Formula One racing team based in the United Kingdom

MRT
- Full name: Manor Racing MRT
- Base: Banbury, Oxfordshire, United Kingdom
- Noted staff: Stephen Fitzpatrick; Abdulla Boulsien; Thomas Mayer; Dave Ryan; John McQuilliam; Nikolas Tombazis; Luca Furbatto; Pat Fry
- Noted drivers: (Indonesia) Rio Haryanto (France) Esteban Ocon (Germany) Pascal Wehrlein
- Previous name: Manor Marussia F1 Team

Formula One World Championship career
- First entry: 2016 Australian Grand Prix
- Last entry: 2016 Abu Dhabi Grand Prix
- Races entered: 21
- Engines: Mercedes
- Constructors' Championships: 0
- Drivers' Championships: 0
- Race victories: 0
- Podiums: 0
- Points: 1
- Pole positions: 0
- Fastest laps: 0

Manor Grand Prix Racing Limited, trading as Manor Racing MRT or Pertamina Manor Racing MRT, was a British Formula One racing team and constructor based in Banbury, Oxfordshire in the United Kingdom. The outfit competed from 2010 to 2016: the team originally started racing in 2010 under the "Virgin Racing" name; the following year Virgin adopted Marussia as a title sponsor, the team became "Marussia Virgin Racing" until being rebranded as the "Marussia F1 Team" for 2012.

Following their collapse in November 2014, the team exited administration in February 2015, and was re-established as the "Manor Marussia F1 Team" after new investment was secured; it was later announced that the businessman Stephen Fitzpatrick had purchased the team. The team retained "Marussia" as its constructor name throughout the 2015 season, also adopting a British licence. In January 2016, the team announced it would be renamed to "Manor Racing". The team competed under the constructor name MRT which stood for Manor Racing Team.

The team closed in March 2017, before the start of the season, after attempts to sell the team to a new owner did not come to fruition.

== History ==
=== Background ===
In 2009, Manor Grand Prix were awarded an entry into Formula One for the 2010 season, as a tie-up between successful junior racing team Manor Motorsport and Wirth Research. Before the end of that year, these entities became known as Virgin Racing, after Richard Branson's Virgin Group of companies who had bought the title sponsorship rights. Marussia were one of the team's partners for its debut season, where it finished in twelfth and last place in the Constructors' Championship. In November 2010, Marussia Motors purchased a controlling stake in the team, and the team became known as 'Marussia Virgin Racing' for the 2011 season.

Following a disappointing start to the 2011 season, the team parted company with Wirth Research and entered a partnership with McLaren Applied Technologies ahead of the 2012 season. With this came a relocation from the original base in Dinnington, to the old Wirth premises in Banbury in Great Britain. Meanwhile, the team again finished the year bottom of the Constructors' Championship. In November 2011, it applied to the Formula One commission to formally change their constructor name for the 2012 season from Virgin to Marussia, to reflect their new ownership becoming Marussia F1 Team in the process. Permission was granted before being formally ratified at a meeting of the FIA World Motor Sport Council. The team competed as Marussia until 2014 when it collapsed mid-season.

In May 2015, the team announced the arrival of Luca Furbatto as Chief Designer. Bob Bell also joined as Consultant.

A deal to save the team was put together ahead of the 2015 season, with Manor operating the team independently of Marussia, though the team kept the Marussia name to secure prize money from the 2014 season. After running an outdated chassis and power unit throughout 2015, the team rebranded itself as Manor Racing MRT for 2016 and signed a deal to use Mercedes engines.

In December 2015, Dave Ryan was appointed Team Principal for the team and two further appointments followed in January 2016, the team appointed former Ferrari chief designer Nikolas Tombazis as its chief aerodynamicist, and recruited fellow former Ferrari employee Pat Fry as an engineering consultant.

In February 2016, Manor confirmed that Pascal Wehrlein, 2015 DTM champion and Mercedes junior driver, and Rio Haryanto would race for the team in 2016.

=== 2016 season ===
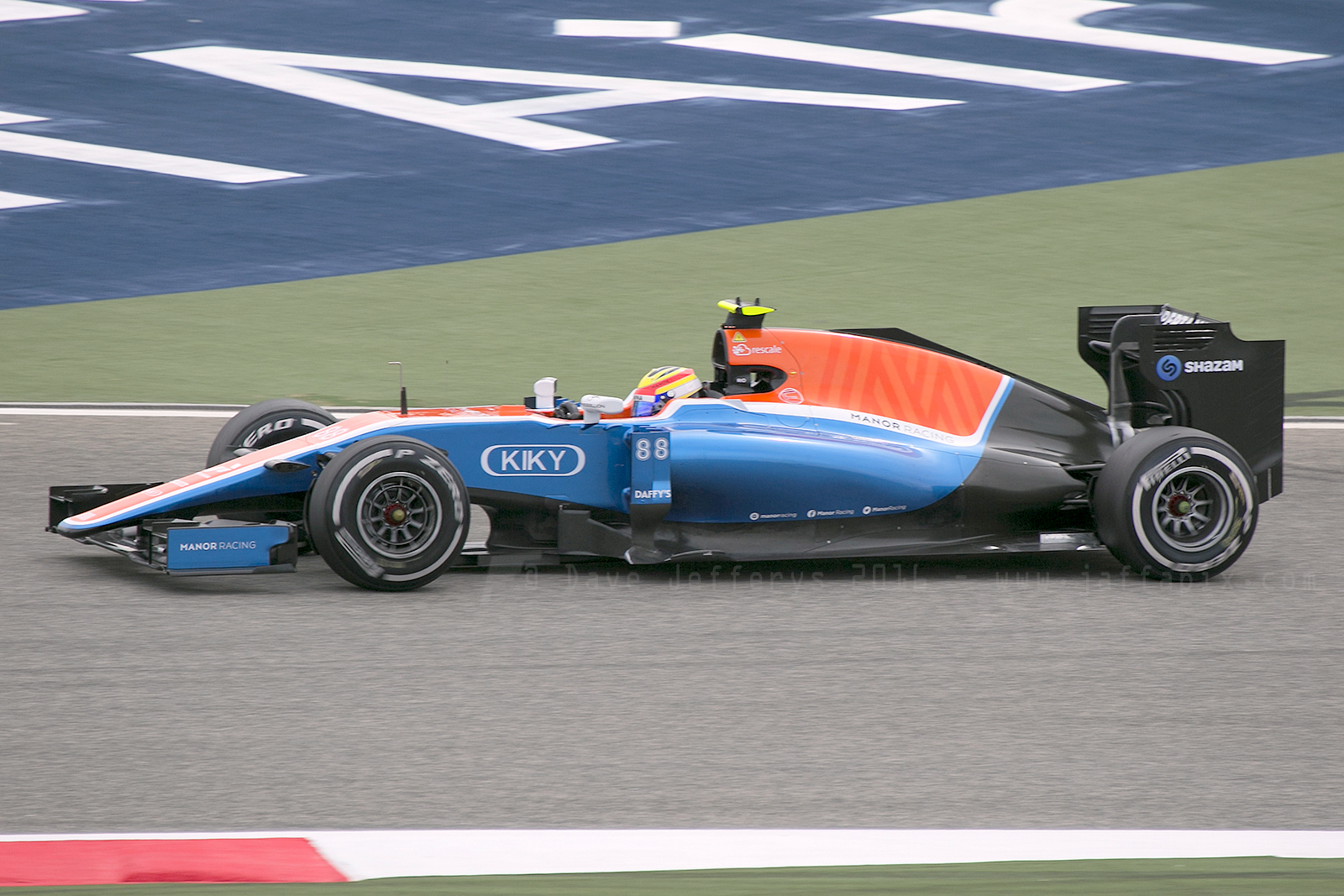
Rio Haryanto during the 2016 Bahrain Grand Prix

On 22 February 2016, Manor launched their new car, the MRT05 at the first pre-season test. The team had undergone a complete re-branding under the ownership of Fitzpatrick, and had seen the team colours change to red, white and blue.

During the first race of the season in Australia, Rio Haryanto retired due to a drivetrain problem, while Pascal Wehrlein finished in sixteenth place. At the next race, in Bahrain, Wehrlein was one place away from reaching Q2 for the first time in his career, qualifying sixteenth. Haryanto finished the race, a career first, in 17th place.

At the Austrian Grand Prix, Wehrlein achieved a 12th place qualifying position, the highest achieved by the team. Wehrlein also scored the team's first ever point and its best result to date by finishing 10th in the race.

The team's reserve driver, Alexander Rossi, won the Indianapolis 500.

Before the 2016 Belgian Grand Prix, Rio Haryanto was demoted to reserve driver due to "his failure to meet his contractual obligations", due to his sponsors being unable to fulfill their financial commitments. For the remaining nine races of the season, he was replaced by Esteban Ocon, who had made frequent appearances testing for both Renault and Mercedes and who was considered to be a promising young talent.

At the end of the Brazilian Grand Prix, which was held in adverse conditions, Sauber gained two points, putting them ahead of Manor in the championship, costing the team £30 million in prize money.

Before the Abu Dhabi Grand Prix, it was confirmed by Stephen Fitzpatrick that the team were in advanced talks with a new investor. However, in early January 2017 the team's parent company was put under administration after the investment talks failed, putting their participation in the 2017 season into doubt. Although they paid their 2017 entry fee, since their participation did not materialise, the entry fee was returned by the FIA at the end of 2017.

== Complete Formula One results ==
(key) (results in bold indicate pole position; races in italics indicate fastest lap)

Year	Name	Chassis	Engine	Tyres	Drivers	1	2	3	4	5	6	7	8	9	10	11	12	13	14	15	16	17	18	19	20	21	Points	WCC
2016	Manor Racing MRT	MRT05	Mercedes PU106C Hybrid 1.6 V6 t	**P**		AUS	BHR	CHN	RUS	ESP	MON	CAN	EUR	AUT	GBR	HUN	GER	BEL	ITA	SIN	MAL	JPN	USA	MEX	BRA	ABU	1	11th
2016	Manor Racing MRT	MRT05	Mercedes PU106C Hybrid 1.6 V6 t	**P**	(Indonesia) Rio Haryanto	Ret	17	21	Ret	17	15	19	18	16	Ret	21	20										1	11th
2016	Manor Racing MRT	MRT05	Mercedes PU106C Hybrid 1.6 V6 t	**P**	(France) Esteban Ocon													16	18	18	16	21	18	21	12	13	1	11th
2016	Manor Racing MRT	MRT05	Mercedes PU106C Hybrid 1.6 V6 t	**P**	(Germany) Pascal Wehrlein	16	13	18	18	16	14	17	Ret	10	Ret	19	17	Ret	Ret	16	15	22	17	Ret	15	14	1	11th

== See also ==
- Manor Motorsport
