= Pascal Wehrlein =

German racing driver (born 1994)

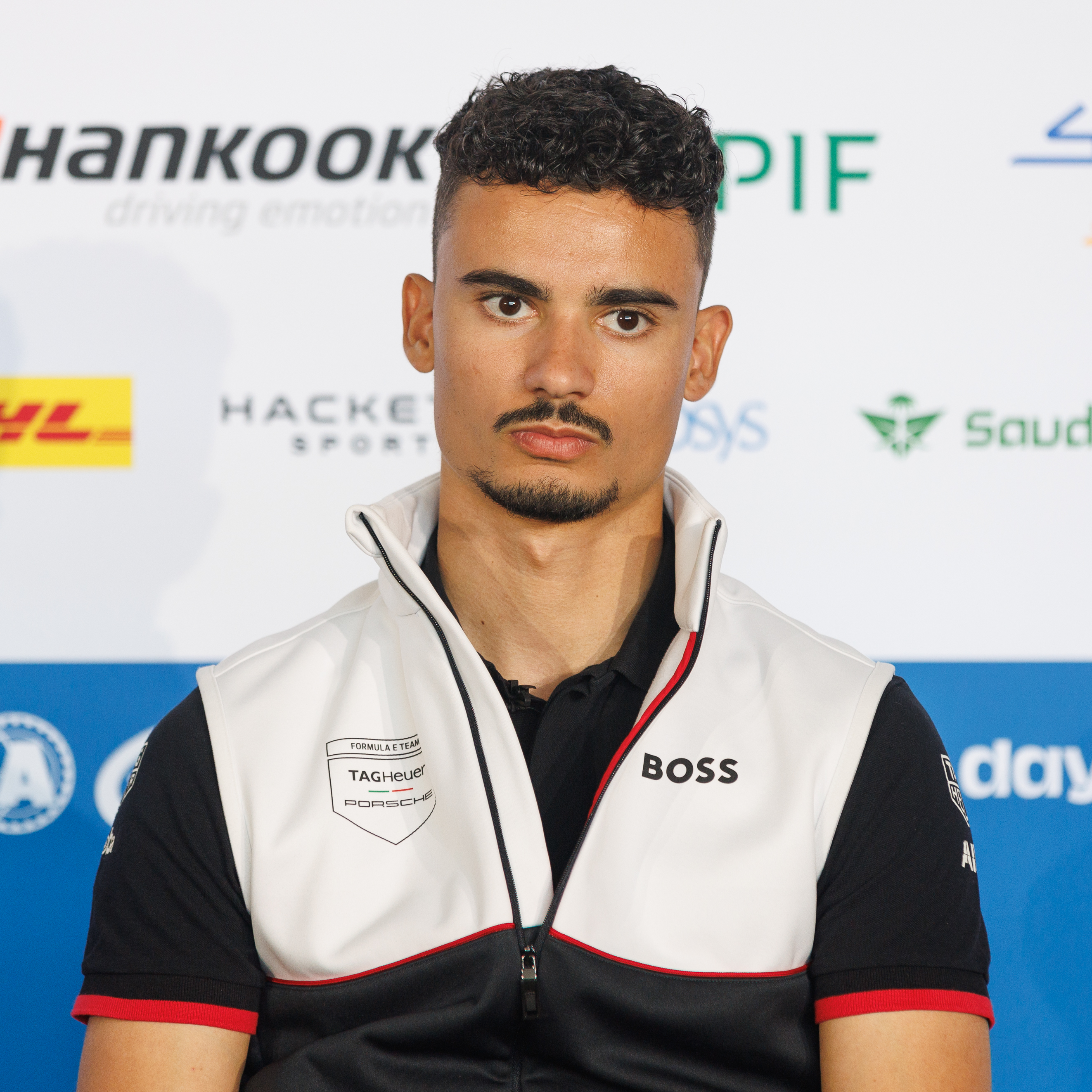
- Wehrlein at the 2024 Berlin ePrix
- Born: Pascal Konrad Wehrlein; 18 October 1994 (age 32); Sigmaringen, Baden-Württemberg, Germany
- Children: 1

Formula E career
- Debut season: 2018–19
- Current team: Porsche
- Categorisation: FIA Platinum
- Car number: 94; 1 (2024–25) (Note: Wehrlein competed using the number 1 during his World Championship defence in 2024–25.)
- Former teams: Mahindra
- Starts: 113
- Championships: 2 (2023–24, 2025–26)
- Wins: 11
- Podiums: 24
- Poles: 13
- Fastest laps: 7
- Finished last season: 1st (169 pts)
- Statistics up to date as of 1 November 2026.

Formula One World Championship career
- Nationality: (Germany) German
- Active years: 2016–2017
- Team(s): Manor, Sauber
- Car number: 94
- Entries: 40 (39 starts)
- Championships: 0
- Wins: 0
- Podiums: 0
- Career points: 6
- Pole positions: 0
- Fastest laps: 0
- First entry: 2016 Australian Grand Prix
- Last entry: 2017 Abu Dhabi Grand Prix

Deutsche Tourenwagen Masters career
- Years active: 2013–2015, 2018
- Teams: Mücke, HWA, Mercedes
- Starts: 58
- Championships: 1 (2015)
- Wins: 3
- Podiums: 7
- Poles: 1
- Fastest laps: 2

Previous series
- 2012–2013; 2012; 2010–2011: FIA F3 European; F3 Euro Series; ADAC Formel Masters

Championship titles
- 2011: ADAC Formel Masters

Awards
- 2016: Autosport Rookie of the Year

Pascal Konrad Wehrlein (German pronunciation: [pasˈkal ˈveːɐ̯.laɪ̯n]; born 18 October 1994) is a German racing driver, who competes in Formula E for Porsche. Wehrlein competed in Formula One from 2016 to 2017, won the DTM for Mercedes, and is a double Formula E world champion with Porsche.

Born and raised in Sigmaringen to a German father and a Mauritian mother, Wehrlein began karting aged eight and progressed to junior formulae in 2010. He won the ADAC Formel Masters in 2011 and finished runner-up in the Formula 3 Euro Series in his debut season. Wehrlein graduated to the DTM with Mercedes and Mücke in 2013. He then moved to HWA, breaking several records before becoming the youngest-ever DTM champion in 2015, aged 20.

A Mercedes junior since 2014, Wehrlein made his Formula One debut for Manor in 2016, scoring its only ever championship point in Austria before moving to Sauber for 2017. After missing the opening two rounds due to injury, Wehrlein scored Sauber's only points of the year, but was not retained for 2018. After another season in DTM with Mercedes, Wehrlein moved to Formula E with Mahindra in 2018–19 while testing for Ferrari in F1.

Wehrlein joined Porsche in 2021, winning the 2022 Mexico City ePrix before becoming a title protagonist throughout the Gen3 era. Wehrlein was crowned Formula E World Champion in 2023–24 and 2025–26, and made his Hypercar debut in 2025.

== Early and personal life ==
Wehrlein was born in Sigmaringen to a German father and Mauritian mother. His father Richard, a former boxer, owns a CNC machining company in Ostrach.

== Junior racing career ==
=== Karting ===
Wehrlein began karting in 2003 and raced only in his native Germany in his early career. He worked his way up from the junior ranks to progress through to the KF2 category by 2009, when he finished on fifth position in ADAC Kart Masters.

=== ADAC Formel Masters ===
2010 saw Wehrlein make his debut in the ADAC Formel Masters championship with ADAC Berlin-Brandenburg e.V. (also known as Mücke Motorsport). He finished sixth in the championship with a win at Sachsenring and three other podiums. Wehrlein remained in the series with the team for the next year. Wehrlein scored seven wins at Oschersleben, Sachsenring, Zolder, Nürburgring and Lausitz on his way to the championship title.

=== Formula 3 Euro Series ===
In 2012, Wehrlein stepped up to the Formula 3 Euro Series, continuing with Mücke Motorsport. He finished second in the championship to Daniel Juncadella.

== DTM career ==
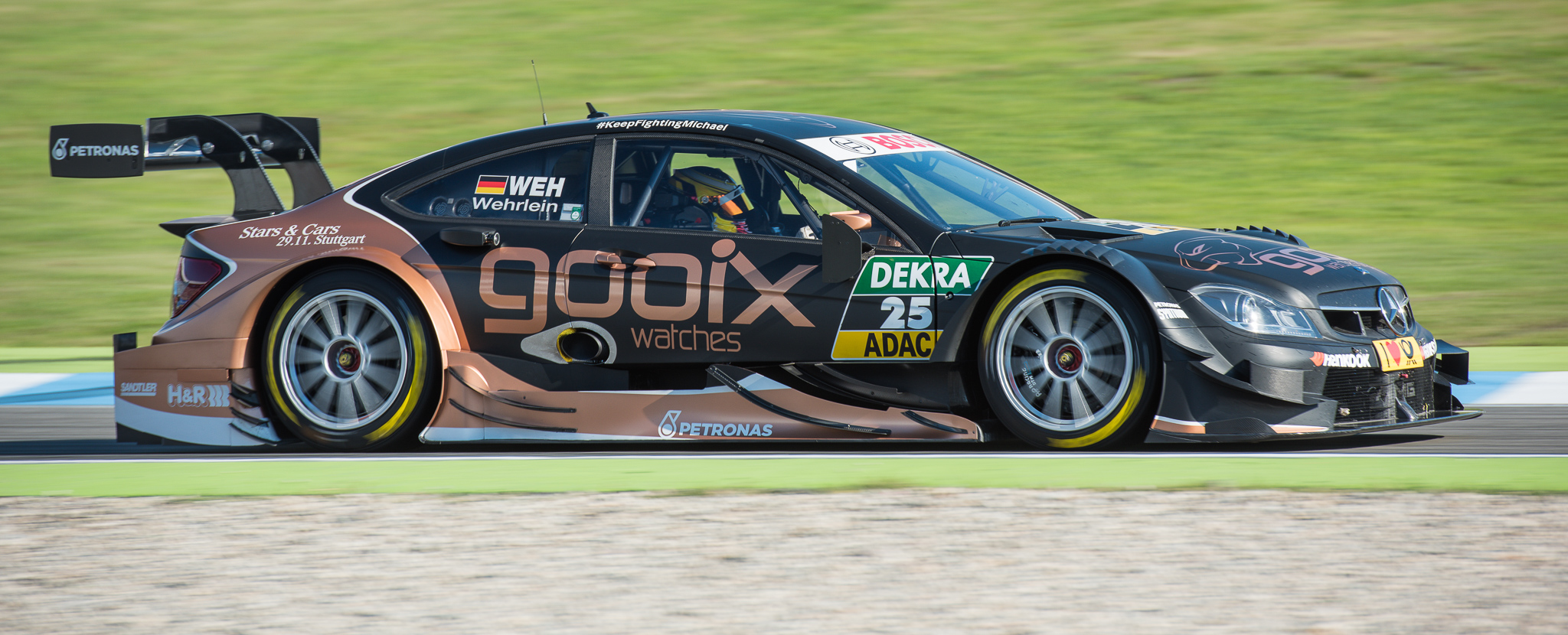
Wehrlein competing in the 2014 DTM season.

=== Mücke (2013) ===
Wehrlein made his Deutsche Tourenwagen Masters (DTM) debut with the Mercedes-Benz team Mücke Motorsport in 2013, becoming the youngest driver in DTM history at the age of eighteen. In a career spanning three seasons, Wehrlein managed to be one of the leading drivers in the field despite his youthful age.

Wehrlein qualified eighth for his debut race at the season opener in Hockenheim and led the race for 16 laps after an early safety car period, but dropped back to the midfield after his mandatory pit stop, finishing his first DTM race just outside the points in 11th. He scored his first points with two tenth-place finishes at the second and third round in Brands Hatch and Spielberg respectively. Wehrlein qualified a season best fifth at Norisring but had to retire from the race with rear axle problems after making contact with the wall. Round seven at Nürburgring saw him achieve his first fastest lap and another tenth-place finish in a race heavily affected by a sudden downpour of rain on the formation lap. Wehrlein finished his rookie season 22nd in the championship.

=== HWA (2014–2015, 2018) ===
In 2014, Wehrlein switched teams to HWA, where he became the youngest driver in the series history to claim pole position and win a race on route to eighth in the championship with 46 points collected. Besides his stand out victory at Lausitz, Wehrlein's second best result of the season was a fifth-place finish at Norisring.

In 2015, DTM returned to running two races per race weekend, resulting in 18 rounds in the 2015 championship. Due to the inconsistency of most teams and drivers, Wehrlein won the title easily, having scored in all rounds except for three. He achieved five podiums, one fastest lap and two wins. He is the first driver to win the championship having not claimed a pole position throughout his championship season while also being the youngest ever DTM champion.

On 7 February 2018, it was announced that Wehrlein would return to DTM with Mercedes-AMG's HWA Team after Mercedes were unable to find him a seat in Formula One. During the 2018 DTM season, Wehrlein achieved one podium and finished the championship in eighth.

On 14 September 2018, it was announced that after six seasons together, Wehrlein and Mercedes would part ways by the end of the 2018 season.

== Formula One career ==
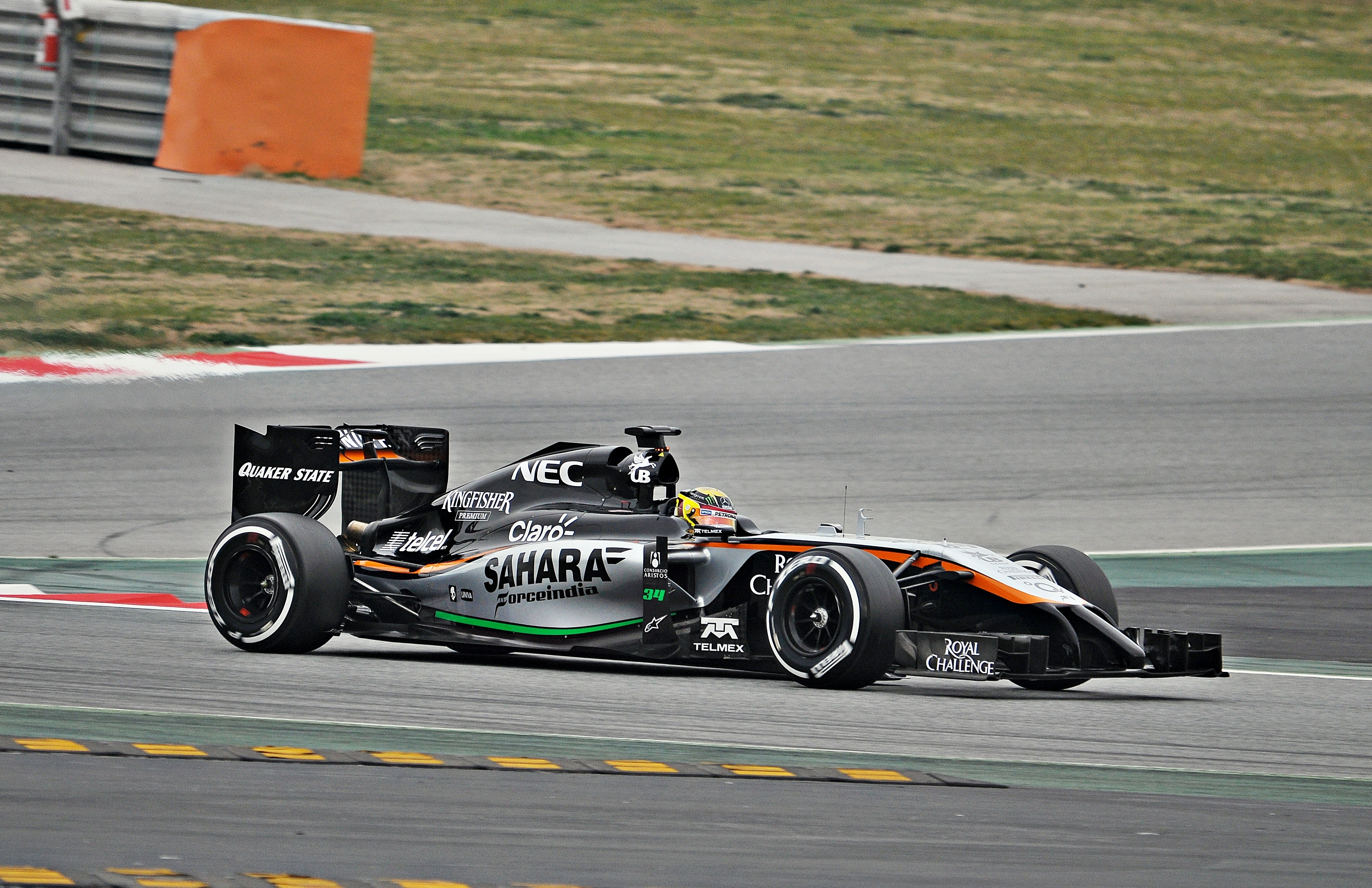
Wehrlein testing for Force India during the 2015 pre-season

In September 2014, it was announced that Wehrlein would act as a reserve driver for the Mercedes F1 Team and was signed up to be their first junior driver. He took part in preseason testing in Barcelona, driving for both Force India and Mercedes.

=== Manor (2016) ===
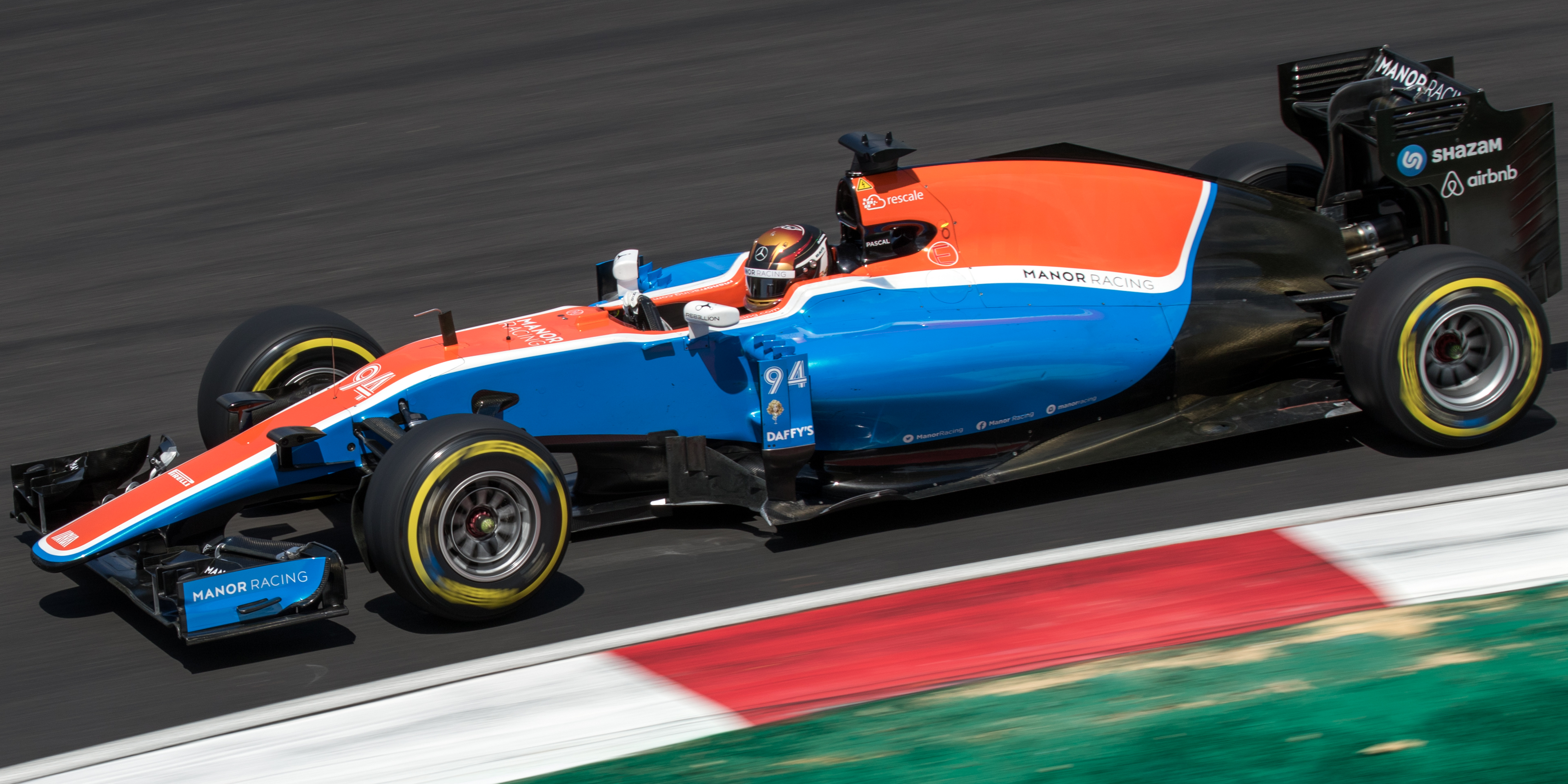
Wehrlein driving for Manor at the 2016 Malaysian Grand Prix

On 10 February 2016, it was announced that Wehrlein would make his F1 debut with Manor Racing. It is understood that Manor would receive access to Mercedes's wind tunnel in exchange for hiring Wehrlein. He picked number 94, in reference to his birth year. Wehrlein scored his and Manor's only point of the season at the Austrian Grand Prix with a tenth-place finish.

=== Sauber (2017) ===
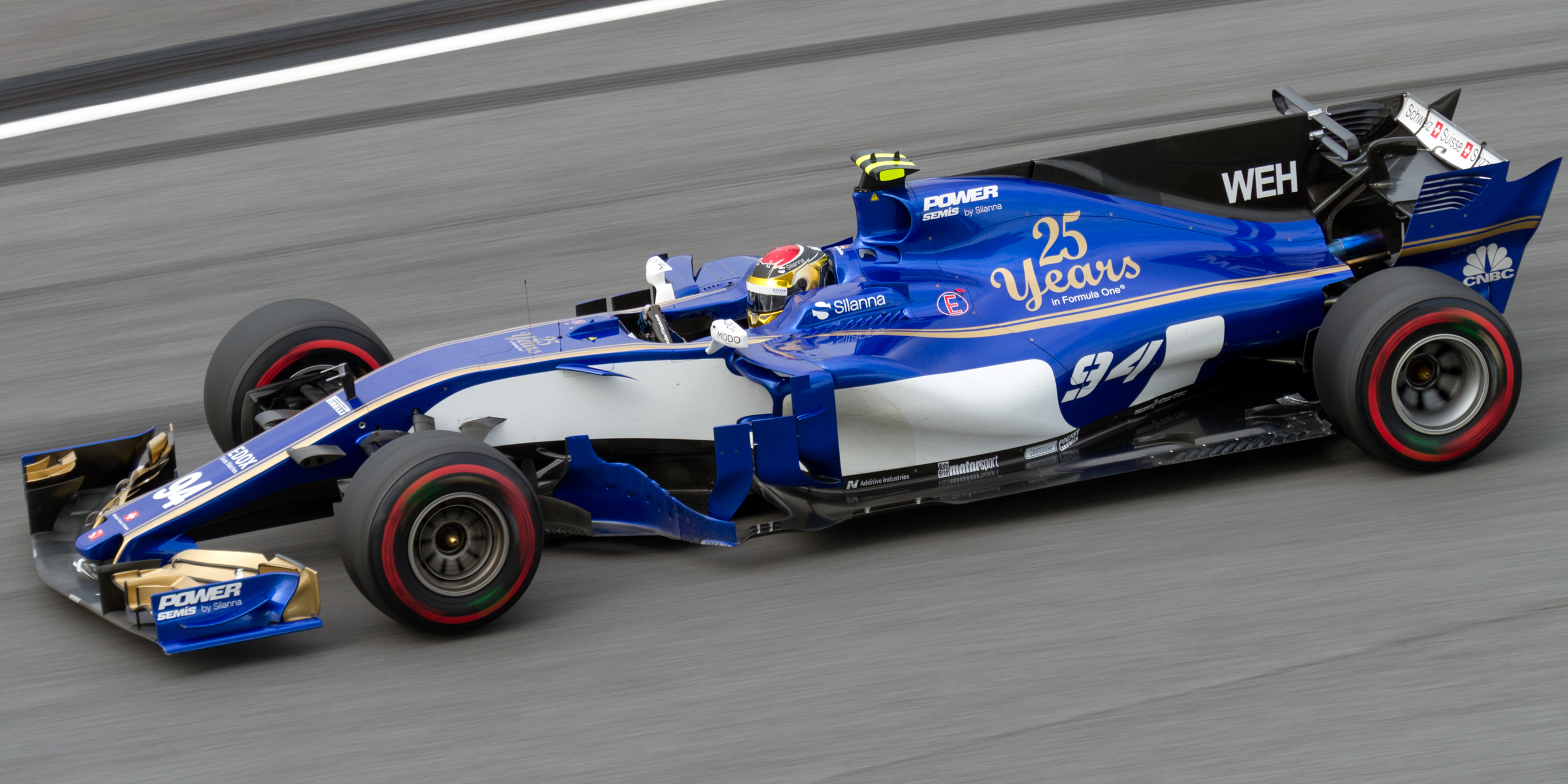
Wehrlein driving for Sauber at the 2017 Malaysian Grand Prix

On 16 January 2017, Wehrlein signed with Sauber. He was forced to miss the first test in Barcelona due to an injury he sustained while competing in the Race of Champions. He was replaced by Antonio Giovinazzi before returning for the second test at the same circuit. Despite being fit to take part in the Australian Grand Prix, he later withdrew after participating in the first two practice sessions, with Giovinazzi replacing him for the rest of the race weekend. On 3 April 2017, Sauber F1 announced Wehrlein would again be replaced by Giovinazzi for the 2017 Chinese Grand Prix. He proceeded with entry into the following Bahrain Grand Prix, qualifying 13th and finishing the race in 11th. He finished eighth in the Spanish Grand Prix after running a one-stop strategy. He did not lose a single one of the places he gained, although a five-second penalty for a pit entry violation cost him seventh to Carlos Sainz Jr. His race at the Monaco Grand Prix ended when, on the 57th lap, Jenson Button tried to lunge down the inside at Portier but succeeded in flipping the Sauber onto its side against the barriers, necessitating another scan of his back. He scored his second points finish of the season in the chaotic Azerbaijan Grand Prix after fighting hard with his teammate Marcus Ericsson for tenth position. This took his points tally to five points. Despite having beaten Ericsson in both qualifying and the majority of races, plus being the only driver who scored points for Sauber that season, on 2 December 2017, Sauber announced that Wehrlein would not be renewed for the 2018 season and that he would be replaced by Charles Leclerc.

=== Ferrari development driver (2019–2020) ===
Wehrlein joined Ferrari as a simulator driver for the 2019 season. He was retained for 2020 but did not continue the following year, citing his commitments as Porsche factory driver.

== Formula E career ==
=== Mahindra (2019–2020) ===
==== 2018–19 ====
Wehrlein moved to Formula E for the 2018–19 season, driving for Mahindra Racing alongside Jérôme D'Ambrosio. He did not contest the opening round of the season in Diriyah, with Felix Rosenqvist replacing him, instead making his debut at the Marrakesh ePrix. Wehrlein earned his first pole position in just his third race in the series at the Mexico City ePrix. In the race he crossed the finish line in second, 0.210s behind Lucas di Grassi after being overtaken in the last corner, but was given a five-second time penalty for cutting a corner earlier in the race which relegated him to sixth position. He set the fastest qualifying time in the qualifying session for the Paris ePrix, but he and teammate d'Ambrosio had their times disallowed for underweight cars, promoting Oliver Rowland to pole position.

==== 2019–20 ====
On 8 June 2020, Wehrlein announced his departure from the Mahindra team in a post on Instagram.

=== Porsche (2021–present) ===
==== 2020–21 ====
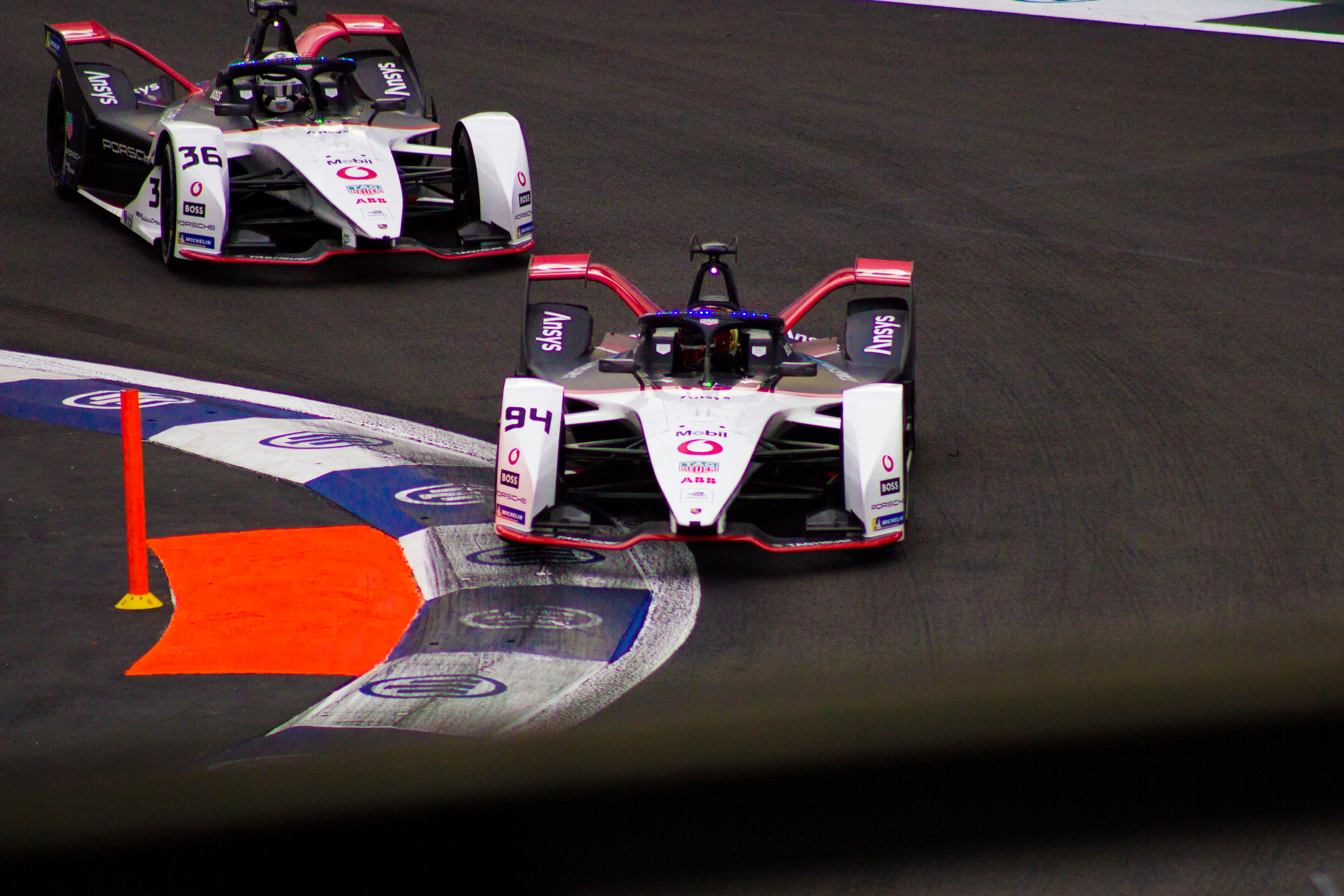
Wehrlein leading teammate André Lotterer to a dominant victory at the 2022 Mexico City ePrix.

Wehrlein was signed up to drive for the Porsche Formula E team for the 2020-21 Formula E World Championship. Wehrlein replaced Neel Jani and partnered with fellow countryman André Lotterer. Wehrlein took pole at the Puebla ePrix and crossed the finish line first, before being disqualified after his team failed to declare his tyre set.

==== 2021–22 ====
Both drivers were retained for the 2021–22 season. Wehrlein took pole in the championship's third round at the Autódromo Hermanos Rodríguez in Mexico City and went on to win the race, claiming his and Porsche's maiden Formula E victory as well as Porsche's first 1-2 finish, with Lotterer crossing the line in second place, making him the first black person and first person of colour to win a Formula E race.

==== 2022–23 ====
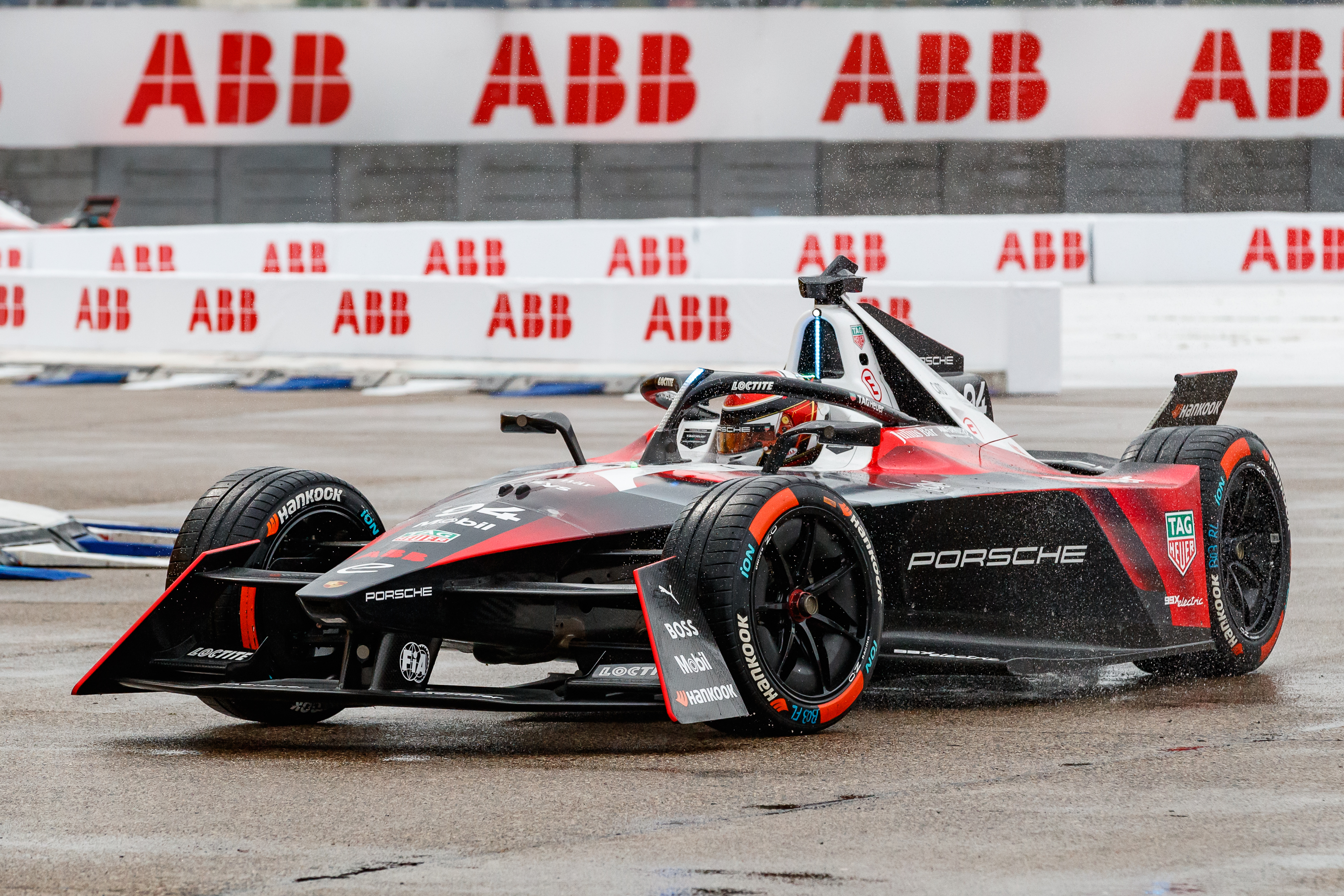
Wehrlein at the 2023 Berlin ePrix.

For the 2023 season, Wehrlein remained with the German manufacturer, entering the Gen3 era alongside António Félix da Costa. His season began in style as, having finished second in the season opener in Mexico City, Wehrlein managed to charge through to victory during Race 1 in Diriyah after starting from ninth place. Wehrlein continued his successful weekend in Saudi Arabia, winning the second race and taking the championship lead. A fourth place in Hyderabad extended his advantage to Jake Dennis in the standings, however the German crashed out of the Cape Town ePrix on the opening lap, missing his braking point and colliding with the back of Sébastien Buemi's car. Wehrlein went on to finish in the points in all remaining races, though he would fall back in the title battle with just one further podium coming in the form of a victory in Jakarta. He and Porsche ended up fourth in the respective championships, as a perceived qualifying weakness was held responsible for the team losing to its customer Andretti.

==== 2023–24: World Champion ====
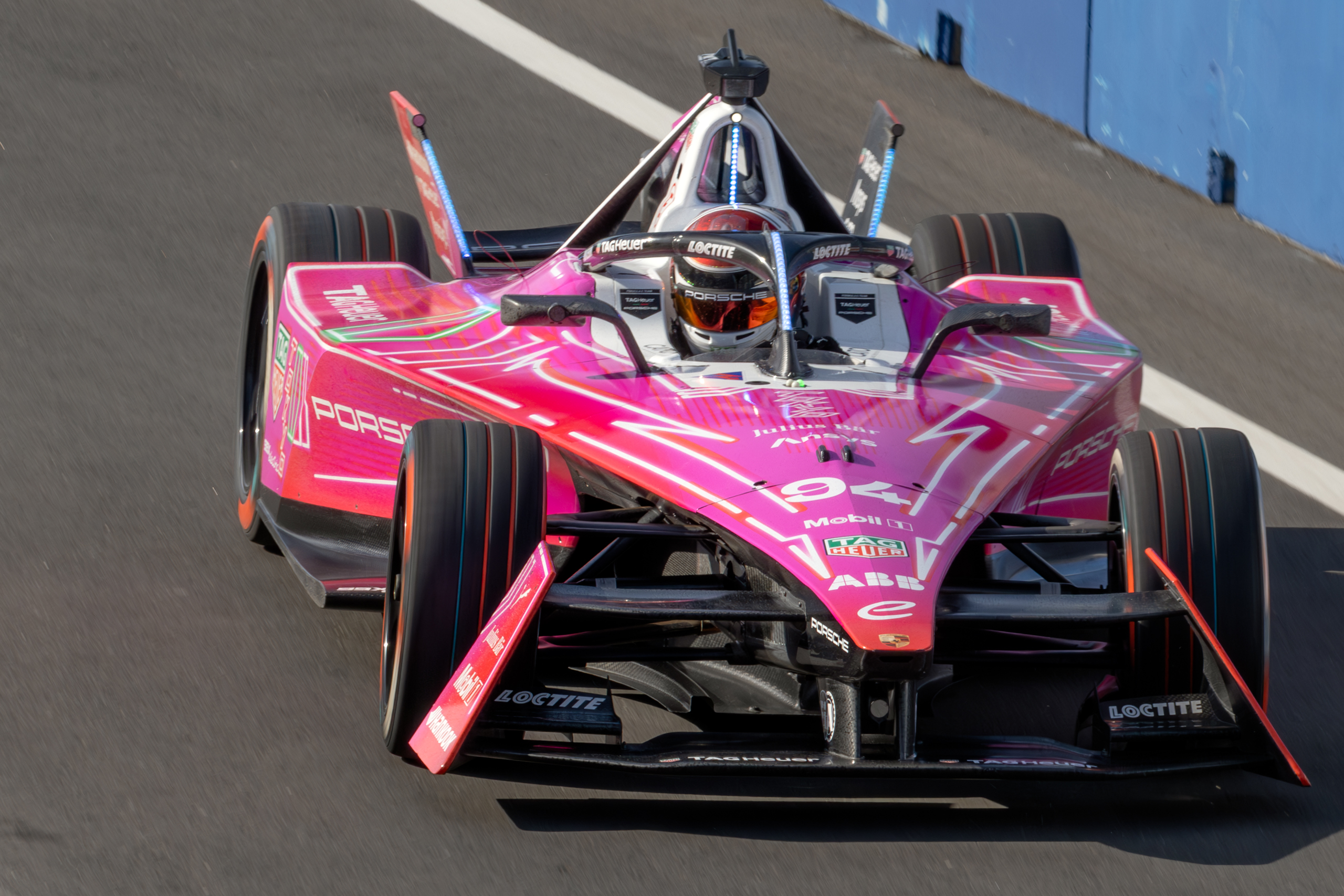
Wehrlein at the 2024 Tokyo ePrix

Wehrlein, Porsche, and da Costa returned for the 2024 season. The German began strongly once again, scoring pole for the season-opener and securing the first win of the season at the Mexico City ePrix. He then scored points in the subsequent four races, even taking pole at São Paulo. The maiden Misano ePrix proved to be a double-edged sword for Wehrlein, who after crashing into Jean-Éric Vergne in race 1 profited from an energy miscalculation by Oliver Rowland and the Nissan team to inherit victory on the last lap. Wehrlein took his third pole of the campaign at Monaco, though he dropped back to fifth in a dominant race for Jaguar. Following a scrappy Berlin weekend, one in which Wehrlein came to blows multiple times with reigning champion Jake Dennis, the German finished second in the first race at Shanghai, losing the lead on the final lap to Mitch Evans but keeping second against Nick Cassidy with an aggressive defence that led to contact between the two cars. On Sunday, a clash with Sam Bird forced Wehrlein to pit for a new front wing, leaving him to finish outside of the points.

Wehrlein gained points against championship leader Cassidy with two top ten finishes at Portland, going into the final round at London with a twelve-point deficit to the Kiwi. During a frantic Saturday race, Wehrlein battled past polesitter Evans to win the race, thus gaining the championship lead. The following day, Wehrlein drove a conservative race, keeping himself between the two Jaguars of Evans and Cassidy for the majority of the contest. When Cassidy retired following a puncture and Evans missed his second attack mode activation, Wehrlein, who by that stage had been passed by Rowland for the race lead, was able to finish second, therefore clinching the title by being six points ahead of Evans.

==== 2024–25 ====
Wehrlein and da Costa continued with Porsche into the 2024–25 season. Wehrlein took one win and five podiums with two poles finishing third in the standings, 39 points behind champion Oliver Rowland. Despite failing to retain his drivers title, Wehrlein's performances across the season helped Porsche win the teams' and manufacturers' championship titles for the first time in their history.

==== 2025–26 ====
Wehrlein is partnered by Nico Müller at Porsche for the 2025—26 season, as da Costa departed the team for Jaguar Racing.

==== 2026–27 ====
Wehrlein and Müller continued at Porsche for the 2026—27 season.

== Endurance racing career ==
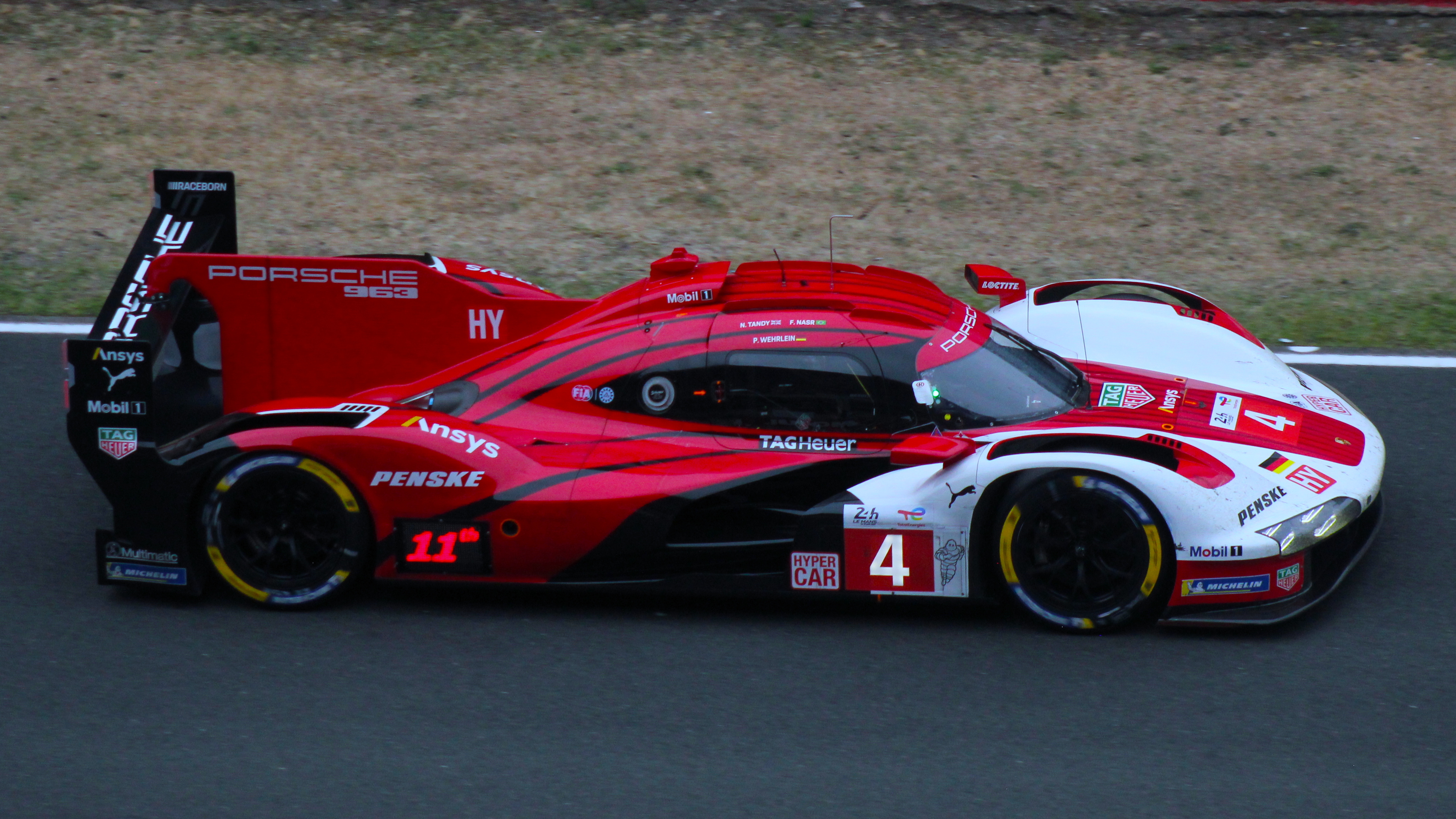
Wehrlein's No. 4 car at the 2025 24 Hours of Le Mans

=== 2025: Daytona and Le Mans debut ===
At the end of 2024, Wehrlein was chosen by JDC–Miller MotorSports to partake in the 2025 24 Hours of Daytona with them alongside Bryce Aron, Gianmaria Bruni and Tijmen van der Helm, therefore making his endurance racing debut. The team brought the car home in sixth place.

Wehrlein made his WEC debut with Porsche Penske Motorsport at the 6 Hours of Spa-Francorchamps. He made his 24 Hours of Le Mans debut later in June, competing with the same team alongside Felipe Nasr and Nick Tandy.

== Karting record ==
=== Karting career summary ===
| Season | Series | Team | Position |
|---|---|---|---|
| 2005 | DMV Bundesmeisterschaft — Bambini A | TR Racing | 3rd |
| 2005 | DMV Landesmeisterschaft Nord — Bambini A | TR Racing | 7th |
| 2005 | DMV Landesmeisterschaft Süd — Bambini A | TR Racing | 1st |
| 2006 | DMV Bundesmeisterschaft — Bambini | TR Racing | 1st |
| 2006 | DMV Landesmeisterschaft Nord — Bambini | TR Racing | 1st |
| 2006 | DMV Landesmeisterschaft Süd — Bambini | TR Racing | 1st |
| 2006 | DMV Landesmeisterschaft Ost — Bambini | TR Racing | 2nd |
| 2006 | DMV Goldpokal Wittgenborn | | 1st |
| 2007 | DMV Bundesmeisterschaft — Junior | TR Racing | 1st |
| 2007 | DMV Landesmeisterschaft Nord — Junior | TR Racing | 1st |
| 2007 | DMV Landesmeisterschaft Süd — Junior | TR Racing | 1st |
| 2007 | DMV Landesmeisterschaft Ost — Junior | TR Racing | 1st |
| 2007 | DMV Goldpokal | | 1st |
| 2007 | Badenpokal | | 1st |
| 2008 | German Karting Championship — Junior | TR Racing | 6th |
| 2008 | DMV Bundesmeisterschaft — KF3 | TR Racing | 1st |
| 2008 | DMV Landesmeisterschaft Nord — KF3 | TR Racing | 1st |
| 2008 | DMV Landesmeisterschaft Süd — KF3 | TR Racing | 1st |
| 2008 | DMV Landesmeisterschaft Ost — KF3 | TR Racing | 2nd |
| 2008 | Stefan-Bellof Pokal | TR Racing | 1st |
| 2008 | DMV Goldpokal | TR Racing | 4th |
| 2008 | Andrea Margutti Trophy — KF3 | TR Racing | 21st |
| 2009 | ADAC Kart Masters — KF2 | Worndorf | 5th |
| 2009 | DMV Kart Championship — KF2 | KSM Racing Team | 1st |
| 2009 | DMV Goldpokal | KSM Racing Team | 3rd |
| 2009 | Graf Berghe von Trips Memorial | | 2nd |

== Racing record ==
=== Racing career summary ===
| Season | Series | Team | Races | Wins | Poles | F/Laps | Podiums | Points | Position |
|---|---|---|---|---|---|---|---|---|---|
| 2010 | ADAC Formel Masters | ADAC Berlin-Brandenburg e.V. | 20 | 1 | 1 | 1 | 4 | 147 | 6th |
| 2011 | ADAC Formel Masters | ADAC Berlin-Brandenburg e.V. | 24 | 8 | 7 | 4 | 13 | 331 | **1st** |
| 2012 | Formula 3 Euro Series | Mücke Motorsport | 24 | 1 | 1 | 1 | 11 | 226 | **2nd** |
| 2012 | FIA Formula 3 European Championship | Mücke Motorsport | 20 | 1 | 1 | 1 | 6 | 179 | 4th |
| 2012 | Masters of Formula 3 | Mücke Motorsport | 1 | 0 | 0 | 0 | 0 | N/A | 5th |
| 2012 | Macau Grand Prix | Mücke Motorsport | 1 | 0 | 0 | 0 | 0 | N/A | 4th |
| 2013 | Deutsche Tourenwagen Masters | Mücke Motorsport | 10 | 0 | 0 | 1 | 0 | 3 | 22nd |
| 2013 | FIA Formula 3 European Championship | Mücke Motorsport | 3 | 1 | 2 | 2 | 3 | 49 | 14th |
| 2014 | Deutsche Tourenwagen Masters | HWA Team | 10 | 1 | 1 | 0 | 1 | 46 | 8th |
| 2014 | Formula One | Mercedes-AMG Petronas F1 Team | Reserve driver | | | | | | |
| 2015 | Deutsche Tourenwagen Masters | HWA AG | 18 | 2 | 0 | 1 | 5 | 169 | **1st** |
| 2016 | Formula One | Manor Racing MRT | 21 | 0 | 0 | 0 | 0 | 1 | 19th |
| 2017 | Formula One | Sauber F1 Team | 19 | 0 | 0 | 0 | 0 | 5 | 18th |
| 2018 | Deutsche Tourenwagen Masters | Mercedes-AMG Motorsport Petronas | 20 | 0 | 0 | 0 | 1 | 108 | 8th |
| 2018–19 | Formula E | Mahindra Racing | 12 | 0 | 1 | 2 | 1 | 58 | 12th |
| 2019 | Formula One | Scuderia Ferrari | Development driver | | | | | | |
| 2019–20 | Formula E | Mahindra Racing | 5 | 0 | 0 | 1 | 0 | 14 | 18th |
| 2020 | Formula One | Scuderia Ferrari | Development driver | | | | | | |
| 2020–21 | Formula E | TAG Heuer Porsche Formula E Team | 15 | 0 | 1 | 0 | 1 | 79 | 11th |
| 2021–22 | Formula E | TAG Heuer Porsche Formula E Team | 16 | 1 | 1 | 0 | 1 | 71 | 10th |
| 2022–23 | Formula E | TAG Heuer Porsche Formula E Team | 16 | 3 | 0 | 0 | 4 | 149 | 4th |
| 2023–24 | Formula E | TAG Heuer Porsche Formula E Team | 16 | 3 | 3 | 0 | 5 | 198 | **1st** |
| 2024–25 | Formula E | TAG Heuer Porsche Formula E Team | 16 | 1 | 3 | 3 | 6 | 145 | **3rd** |
| 2025 | IMSA SportsCar Championship - GTP | JDC–Miller MotorSports | 1 | 0 | 0 | 0 | 0 | 276 | 35th |
| 2025 | FIA World Endurance Championship - Hypercar | Porsche Penske Motorsport | 1 | 0 | 0 | 0 | 0 | 2 | 25th |
| 2025 | 24 Hours of Le Mans - Hypercar | Porsche Penske Motorsport | 1 | 0 | 0 | 0 | 0 | N/A | 9th |
| 2025–26 | Formula E | Porsche Formula E Team | 17 | 3 | 4 | 1 | 6 | 169 | **1st** |
| 2026–27 | Formula E | Porsche Formula E Team | 0 | 0 | 0 | 0 | 0 | 0 | TBD |

* Season still in progress.

=== Complete ADAC Formel Masters results ===
(key)

| Year | Team | 1 | 2 | 3 | 4 | 5 | 6 | 7 | 8 | 9 | 10 | 11 | 12 | 13 | 14 | 15 | 16 | 17 | 18 | 19 | 20 | 21 | 22 | 23 | 24 | DC | Points |
|---|---|---|---|---|---|---|---|---|---|---|---|---|---|---|---|---|---|---|---|---|---|---|---|---|---|---|---|
| 2010 | ADAC Berlin-Brandenburg e.V. | OSC1; 1; 3 | OSC1; 2; 8 | OSC1; 3; 4 | SAC; 1; 3 | SAC; 2; 2 | SAC; 3; 1 | HOC; 1; 10 | HOC; 2; 7 | HOC; 3; 13 | **ASS**; **1**; 4 | ASS; 2; 4 | ASS; 3; 5 | LAU; 1; 5 | LAU; 2; 10 | LAU; 3; 9 | NÜR; 1; 8 | NÜR; 2; 5 | NÜR; 3; 7 | OSC2; 1 DNS | OSC2; 2; 6 | OSC2; 3; 4 | | | | 6th | 147 |
| 2011 | ADAC Berlin-Brandenburg e.V. | **OSC**; **1**; 1 | OSC; 2; 2 | OSC; 3; 2 | **SAC**; **1**; 1 | SAC; 2 Ret | SAC; 3; 5 | **ZOL**; **1**; 1 | ZOL; 2; 1 | ZOL; 3; 1 | **NÜR**; **1**; 1 | NÜR; 2; 1 | NÜR; 3 DSQ | **RBR**; **1**; 13 | RBR; 2; 3 | RBR; 3 DSQ | LAU; 1; 1 | LAU; 2; 4 | LAU; 3; 3 | **ASS**; **1**; 6 | ASS; 2 DSQ | ASS; 3; 5 | **HOC**; **1**; 3 | HOC; 2; 5 | HOC; 3 Ret | 1st | 331 |

=== Complete Formula 3 Euro Series results ===
(key)

| Year | Entrant | Chassis | Engine | 1 | 2 | 3 | 4 | 5 | 6 | 7 | 8 | 9 | 10 | 11 | 12 | 13 | 14 | 15 | 16 | 17 | 18 | 19 | 20 | 21 | 22 | 23 | 24 | DC | Points |
|---|---|---|---|---|---|---|---|---|---|---|---|---|---|---|---|---|---|---|---|---|---|---|---|---|---|---|---|---|---|
| 2012 | Mücke Motorsport | Dallara F312/023 | Mercedes | HOC; 1 Ret | HOC; 2; 9 | HOC; 3; 8 | BRH; 1; 5 | BRH; 2; 3 | BRH; 3; 5 | RBR; 1; 2 | RBR; 2; 6 | RBR; 3; 4 | NOR; 1; 7 | NOR; 2; 3 | **NOR**; **3** Ret | NÜR; 1; 3 | NÜR; 2; 4 | NÜR; 3; 1 | ZAN; 1; 7 | ZAN; 2; 3 | ZAN; 3; 3 | VAL; 1; 5 | VAL; 2; 3 | VAL; 3; 4 | HOC; 1; 2 | HOC; 2; 8 | HOC; 3; 2 | 2nd | 226 |

=== Complete FIA Formula 3 European Championship results ===
(key)

| Year | Entrant | Engine | 1 | 2 | 3 | 4 | 5 | 6 | 7 | 8 | 9 | 10 | 11 | 12 | 13 | 14 | 15 | 16 | 17 | 18 | 19 | 20 | 21 | 22 | 23 | 24 | 25 | 26 | 27 | 28 | 29 | 30 | DC | Points |
|---|---|---|---|---|---|---|---|---|---|---|---|---|---|---|---|---|---|---|---|---|---|---|---|---|---|---|---|---|---|---|---|---|---|---|
| 2012 | Mücke Motorsport | Mercedes | HOC; 1 Ret | HOC; 2; 8 | PAU; 1 Ret | PAU; 2; 9 | BRH; 1; 5 | BRH; 2; 5 | RBR; 1; 2 | RBR; 2; 4 | NOR; 1; 7 | **NOR**; **2** Ret | SPA; 1; 14 | SPA; 2; 12 | NÜR; 1; 3 | NÜR; 2; 1 | ZAN; 1; 7 | ZAN; 2; 3 | VAL; 1; 5 | VAL; 2; 4 | HOC; 1; 2 | HOC; 2; 2 | | | | | | | | | | | 4th | 179 |
| 2013 | Mücke Motorsport | Mercedes | **MNZ**; **1**; 3 | **MNZ**; **2**; 1 | MNZ; 3; 2 | SIL; 1 | SIL; 2 | SIL; 3 | HOC; 1 | HOC; 2 | HOC; 3 | BRH; 1 | BRH; 2 | BRH; 3 | RBR; 1 | RBR; 2 | RBR; 3 | NOR; 1 | NOR; 2 | NOR; 3 | NÜR; 1 | NÜR; 2 | NÜR; 3 | ZAN; 1 | ZAN; 2 | ZAN; 3 | VAL; 1 | VAL; 2 | VAL; 3 | HOC; 1 | HOC; 2 | HOC; 3 | 14th | 49 |

=== Complete Deutsche Tourenwagen Masters results ===
(key) (Races in bold indicate pole position) (Races in italics indicate fastest lap)

| Year | Team | Car | 1 | 2 | 3 | 4 | 5 | 6 | 7 | 8 | 9 | 10 | 11 | 12 | 13 | 14 | 15 | 16 | 17 | 18 | 19 | 20 | Pos | Points |
|---|---|---|---|---|---|---|---|---|---|---|---|---|---|---|---|---|---|---|---|---|---|---|---|---|
| 2013 | Mücke Motorsport | DTM AMG Mercedes C-Coupé | HOC; 11 | BRH; 10 | SPL; 10 | LAU; 17 | NOR; 20† | MSC; 11 | NÜR; 10 | OSC; 11 | ZAN; 12 | HOC; 17 | | | | | | | | | | | 22nd | 3 |
| 2014 | HWA Team | DTM AMG Mercedes C-Coupé | HOC; 11 | OSC; Ret | HUN; 14 | NOR; 5 | MSC; 8 | SPL; Ret | NÜR; 10 | **LAU**; 1 | ZAN; 7 | HOC; 20† | | | | | | | | | | | 8th | 46 |
| 2015 | HWA AG | DTM AMG Mercedes C-Coupé | HOC; 1; 2 | HOC; 2; 8 | LAU; 1; 5 | LAU; 2; 13 | NOR; 1; 1 | NOR; 2; 5 | ZAN; 1; 10 | ZAN; 2; 6 | SPL; 1; 2 | SPL; 2; 21† | MSC; 1; 1 | MSC; 2; 10 | OSC; 1; 5 | OSC; 2; 5 | NÜR; 1; 3 | NÜR; 2; 5 | HOC; 1; 8 | HOC; 2; 20 | | | 1st | 169 |
| 2018 | Mercedes-AMG Motorsport Petronas | Mercedes-AMG C63 DTM | HOC; 1; 5 | HOC; 2; 6 | LAU; 1; 8 | LAU; 2; 3 | HUN; 1; 13 | HUN; 2; 12 | NOR; 1; 13 | NOR; 2; 9 | ZAN; 1; 4 | ZAN; 2; 6 | BRH; 1; 7 | BRH; 2; 4 | MIS; 1; 6 | MIS; 2; 12 | NÜR; 1; 7 | NÜR; 2; 9 | SPL; 1; 13 | SPL; 2; 6 | HOC; 1; 11 | HOC; 2 DSQ | 8th | 108 |

^{†} Driver did not finish, but completed 75% of the race distance.

=== Complete Formula One results ===
(key) (Races in bold indicate pole position; races in italics indicate fastest lap)

| Year | Entrant | Chassis | Engine | 1 | 2 | 3 | 4 | 5 | 6 | 7 | 8 | 9 | 10 | 11 | 12 | 13 | 14 | 15 | 16 | 17 | 18 | 19 | 20 | 21 | WDC | Points |
|---|---|---|---|---|---|---|---|---|---|---|---|---|---|---|---|---|---|---|---|---|---|---|---|---|---|---|
| 2016 | Manor Racing MRT | Manor MRT05 | Mercedes PU106C Hybrid 1.6 V6 t | AUS; 16 | BHR; 13 | CHN; 18 | RUS; 18 | ESP; 16 | MON; 14 | CAN; 17 | EUR; Ret | AUT; 10 | GBR; Ret | HUN; 19 | GER; 17 | BEL; Ret | ITA; Ret | SIN; 16 | MAL; 15 | JPN; 22 | USA; 17 | MEX; Ret | BRA; 15 | ABU; 14 | 19th | 1 |
| 2017 | Sauber F1 Team | Sauber C36 | Ferrari 061 1.6 V6 t | AUS; WD | CHN | BHR; 11 | RUS; 16 | ESP; 8 | MON; Ret | CAN; 15 | AZE; 10 | AUT; 14 | GBR; 17 | HUN; 15 | BEL; Ret | ITA; 16 | SIN; 12 | MAL; 17 | JPN; 15 | USA; Ret | MEX; 14 | BRA; 14 | ABU; 14 | | 18th | 5 |

=== Complete Formula E results ===
(key) (Races in bold indicate pole position; races in italics indicate fastest lap)

| Year | Team | Chassis | Powertrain | 1 | 2 | 3 | 4 | 5 | 6 | 7 | 8 | 9 | 10 | 11 | 12 | 13 | 14 | 15 | 16 | 17 | Pos | Points |
|---|---|---|---|---|---|---|---|---|---|---|---|---|---|---|---|---|---|---|---|---|---|---|
| 2018–19 | Mahindra Racing | Spark SRT05e | Mahindra M5Electro | ADR | MRK; Ret | SCL; 2 | **MEX**; 6 | HKG; Ret | SYX; 7 | RME; 10 | PAR; 10 | MCO; 4 | BER; 10 | BRN; Ret | NYC; 7 | NYC; 12 | | | | | 12th | 58 |
| 2019–20 | Mahindra Racing | Spark SRT05e | Mahindra M6Electro | DIR; 11 | DIR; 15 | SCL; 4 | MEX; 9 | MRK; 22 | BER | BER | BER | BER | BER | BER | | | | | | | 18th | 14 |
| 2020–21 | TAG Heuer Porsche Formula E Team | Spark SRT05e | Porsche 99X Electric | DIR; 5 | DIR; 10 | RME; 7 | RME; 3 | VLC; Ret | VLC; 18 | MCO; Ret | **PUE**; DSQ | PUE; 4 | NYC; Ret | NYC; 4 | LDN; 10 | LDN; 5 | BER; 21 | BER; 6 | | | 11th | 79 |
| 2021–22 | TAG Heuer Porsche Formula E Team | Spark SRT05e | Porsche 99X Electric | DRH; 11 | DRH; 9 | **MEX**; 1 | RME; 8 | RME; 6 | MCO; Ret | BER; 6 | BER; 12 | JAK; 8 | MRK; 12 | NYC; 6 | NYC; 11 | LDN; 10 | LDN; 10 | SEO; 7 | SEO; Ret | | 10th | 71 |
| 2022–23 | TAG Heuer Porsche Formula E Team | Formula E Gen3 | Porsche 99X Electric | MEX; 2 | DRH; 1 | DRH; 1 | HYD; 4 | CAP; Ret | SAP; 7 | BER; 6 | BER; 7 | MCO; 10 | JAK; 1 | JAK; 6 | POR; 8 | RME; 9 | RME; 7 | LDN; 9 | LDN; 10 | | 4th | 149 |
| 2023–24 | TAG Heuer Porsche Formula E Team | Formula E Gen3 | Porsche 99X Electric | **MEX**; 1 | DRH; 8 | DRH; 7 | **SAP**; 4 | TOK; 5 | MIS; 16 | MIS; 1 | **MCO**; 5 | BER; 5 | BER; 4 | SHA; 2 | SHA; 20 | POR; 10 | POR; 4 | LDN; 1 | LDN; 2 | | 1st | 198 |
| 2024–25 | TAG Heuer Porsche Formula E Team | Formula E Gen3 Evo | Porsche 99X Electric | **SAO**; Ret | **MEX**; 3 | JED; 15 | JED; 8 | MIA; 1 | MCO; 6 | MCO; 7 | TKO; 13 | TKO; 2 | SHA; 12 | SHA; 2 | JKT; 11 | BER; 2 | **BER**; 15 | LDN; 3 | LDN; 8 | | 3rd | 145 |
| 2025–26 | Porsche Formula E Team | Formula E Gen3 Evo | Porsche 99X Electric | **SAO**; 4 | MEX; 6 | MIA; 3 | JED; 1 | JED; 8 | MAD; 3 | BER; 19 | **BER**; 3 | MCO; 18 | MCO; 11 | SAN; 14 | **SHA**; 1 | SHA; 4 | TKO; Ret | TKO; 13 | **LDN**; 1 | LDN; 14 | 1st | 169 |

^{*} Season still in progress.

=== Complete IMSA SportsCar Championship results ===
(key) (Races in bold indicate pole position; races in italics indicate fastest lap)

| Year | Entrant | Class | Chassis | Engine | 1 | 2 | 3 | 4 | 5 | 6 | 7 | 8 | 9 | Rank | Points |
|---|---|---|---|---|---|---|---|---|---|---|---|---|---|---|---|
| 2025 | JDC–Miller MotorSports | GTP | Porsche 963 | Porsche 9RD 4.6 L V8 | DAY; 6 | SEB | LBH | LGA | DET | WGL | ELK | IMS | PET | 35th | 276 |

=== Complete FIA World Endurance Championship results ===
(key) (Races in bold indicate pole position; races in italics indicate fastest lap)

| Year | Entrant | Class | Car | Engine | 1 | 2 | 3 | 4 | 5 | 6 | 7 | 8 | Rank | Points |
|---|---|---|---|---|---|---|---|---|---|---|---|---|---|---|
| 2025 | Porsche Penske Motorsport | Hypercar | Porsche 963 | Porsche 4.6 L Turbo V8 | QAT | IMO | SPA; 9 | LMS | SÃO | COA | FUJ | BHR | 25th | 2 |

=== Complete 24 Hours of Le Mans results ===
| Year | Team | Co-Drivers | Car | Class | Laps | Pos. | Class Pos. |
|---|---|---|---|---|---|---|---|
| 2025 | (Germany) Porsche Penske Motorsport | (Brazil) Felipe Nasr (United Kingdom) Nick Tandy | Porsche 963 | Hypercar | 386 | 8th | 8th |

== Notes ==
Sporting positions
| Preceded by Richie Stanaway | ADAC Formel Masters; Champion; 2011 | Succeeded by Marvin Kirchhöfer |
| Preceded by Marco Wittmann | Deutsche Tourenwagen Masters; Champion; 2015 | Succeeded by Marco Wittmann |
| Preceded by Jake Dennis | Formula E Champion; 2023-24 | Succeeded by Oliver Rowland |
Awards
| Preceded by Max Verstappen | Autosport Awards; Rookie of the Year; 2016 | Succeeded by Charles Leclerc |
