= John McQuilliam =

British racing car designer (born 1962)

- Born: 3 August 1962 (age 64)
- Education: University of Salford (BS); Imperial College London (MS)
- Occupation: Engineer
- Years active: 1986–present
- Known for: Formula One, (Williams, Arrows, Jordan, Midland, Spyker, Marussia, Manor, Cadillac)

John McQuilliam (born 3 August 1962) is a Formula One car designer who is the chief designer of the Cadillac Formula One Team.

== Career ==
McQuilliam worked for Williams from 1986, and subsequently Arrows, as a composite engineer before joining Jordan. After Jordan was purchased by Midland Group in 2005, McQuilliam remained with the team until it was sold again to Spyker Cars in 2007. At the end of 2007, he left Spyker and then worked for Wirth Research, a company owned by Nick Wirth, as an aerodynamics expert.

In March 2014, McQuilliam was back in Formula One as a technical expert/designer for Marussia, which continued into 2015 as Manor. For the 2016 season, he was appointed as technical director. After the demise of Manor, McQuilliam joined Prodrive, as chief engineer in their composites division. In 2024, McQuilliam joined Andretti Global as the team's chief designer for their Cadillac Formula One team, which planned to enter the sport in 2026.
