= Mercedes F1 W07 Hybrid =

Formula One racing car

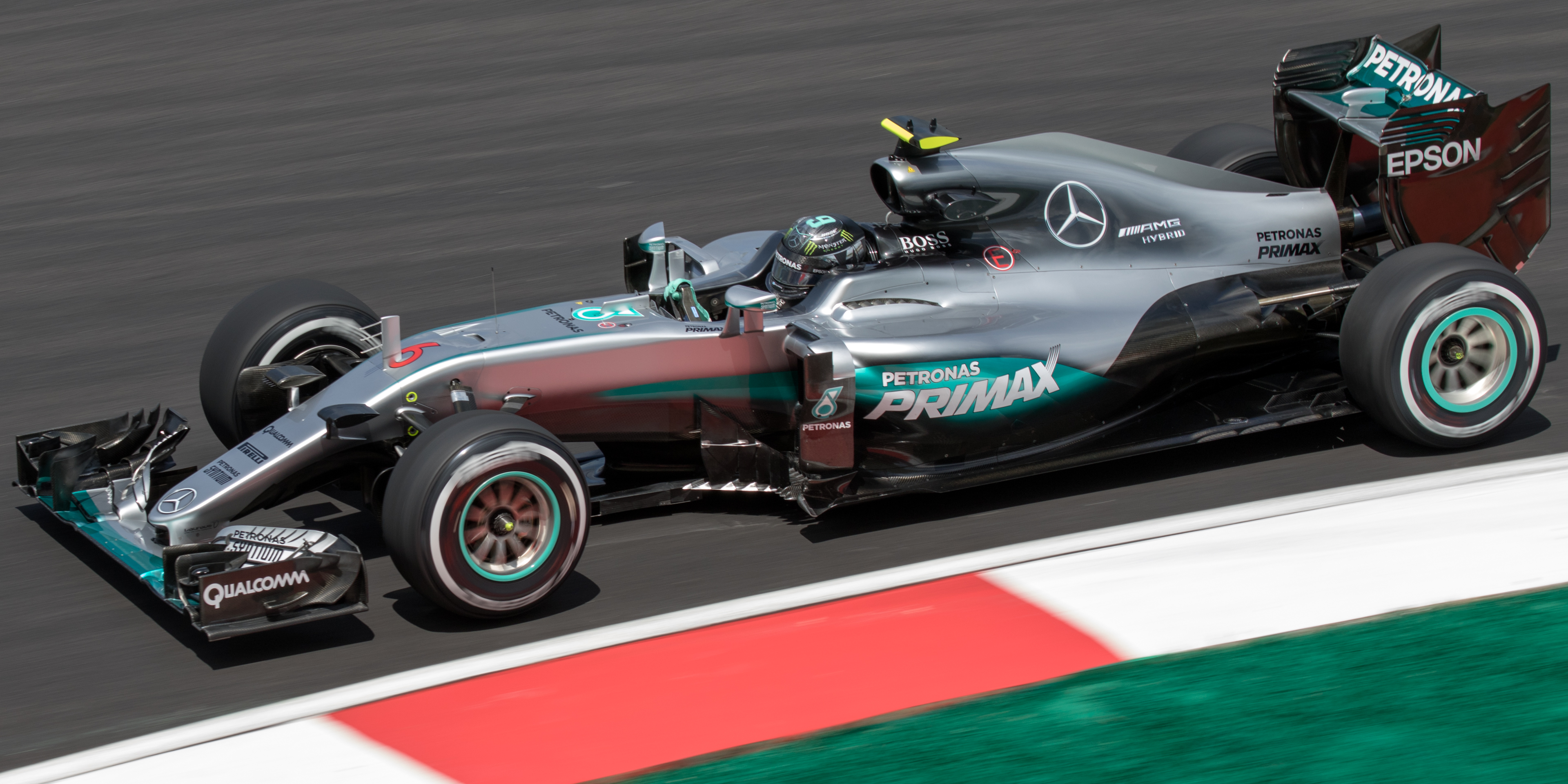
- The F1 W07 Hybrid, driven by Nico Rosberg during the Malaysian Grand Prix
- Category: Formula One
- Constructor: Mercedes
- Designers: Paddy Lowe (Technical Director); Aldo Costa (Engineering Director); Geoff Willis (Technology Director); Mark Ellis (Performance Director); John Owen (Chief Designer); Loïc Serra (Chief Vehicle Dynamicist); Russell Cooley (Chief Engineer); Mike Elliott (Head of Aerodynamics); Jarrod Murphy (Chief Aerodynamicist); Andy Cowell (Managing Director - Power Unit); Hywel Thomas (Engineering Director - Power Unit)
- Predecessor: Mercedes F1 W06 Hybrid
- Successor: Mercedes AMG F1 W08 EQ Power+

Technical specifications
- Chassis: Moulded carbon fibre & Honeycomb composite structure
- Suspension (front): Carbon fibre wishbone and pushrod activated torsion springs & rockers
- Suspension (rear): Carbon fibre wishbone and pullrod activated torsion springs & rockers
- Length: 5,000 mm (197 in)
- Width: 1,800 mm (71 in)
- Height: 950 mm (37 in)
- Wheelbase: 3,500 mm (137.8 in)
- Engine: Mercedes-Benz PU106C Hybrid, 1.6 L (98 cu in), 90° - V6 turbocharged engine, limited to 15,000 RPM, in a mid-mounted, rear-wheel drive layout
- Electric motor: Motor Generator Unit–Kinetic (MGU-K), Motor Generator Unit–Heat (MGU-H)
- Transmission: Mercedes co-developed with Xtrac semi-automatic seamless shift sequential gearbox with eight forward and one reverse gears
- Battery: Mercedes lithium-ion batteries solution
- Power: 900 horsepower (670 kW)
- Weight: 702 kg (1,547.6 lb)
- Fuel: Petronas Primax
- Lubricants: Petronas Syntium & Tutela
- Brakes: Carbone Industrie carbon brake discs, pads and Brembo brake calipers with rear brake-by-wire
- Tyres: Pirelli P Zero (Dry/Slick); Pirelli Cinturato (Wet/Treaded); Advanti forged magnesium wheels: 13"
- Clutch: Carbon fibre reinforced carbon plate

Competition history
- Notable entrants: Mercedes AMG Petronas F1 Team
- Notable drivers: 6. (Germany) Nico Rosberg; 44. (United Kingdom) Lewis Hamilton
- Debut: 2016 Australian Grand Prix
- First win: 2016 Australian Grand Prix
- Last win: 2016 Abu Dhabi Grand Prix
- Last event: 2016 Abu Dhabi Grand Prix
Races	Wins	Podiums	Poles	F/Laps
21	19	33	20	9
- Constructors' Championships: 1 (2016)
- Drivers' Championships: 1 (Nico Rosberg, 2016)

The Mercedes F1 W07 Hybrid (commonly abbreviated as the Mercedes W07) is a Formula One racing car which competed in the 2016 FIA Formula One World Championship. It is one of the most successful Mercedes-Benz designs of all time, designed and developed under the direction of Paddy Lowe, Aldo Costa, Geoff Willis, Loïc Serra, Russell Cooley, John Owen, Mike Elliott, and Jarrod Murphy. The cars were driven by three-time World Drivers' Champion Lewis Hamilton, and Nico Rosberg, both of whom remained with the team for a fourth and a seventh season, respectively. In addition, it was the last Formula One car driven by Rosberg, following his announcement on his retirement from the sport after clinching his only World Drivers' Championship title.

The chassis was named "F1 W07 Hybrid" to represent the seventh Formula One car that Mercedes had constructed since 2010, while the hybrid was marked to recognize the utilization of fully integrated hybrid power units. The car made its competitive debut at the 2016 Australian Grand Prix, the opening round of the 2016 season. After participating 20 rounds of grand prix racing, the car made its final competition appearance at the season finale race – 2016 Abu Dhabi Grand Prix, before retirement.

With a total of 19 wins, 20 pole positions, 33 podium finishes and a total of 765 constructors championship points in a single season, the F1 W07 Hybrid is statistically the third most dominant Formula One car in the history of the sport with a win percentage of 90.47%, behind the 1988 McLaren MP4/4 (93.75%) and the 2023 Red Bull RB19 (95.45%).

== Design and development ==
The F1 W07 Hybrid was the successor to the F1 W06 Hybrid, which has been described as one of the most dominant cars in the sport's history. Mercedes declared that the new car designed in Brackley, with the engine from Mercedes AMG High Performance Powertrains at Brixworth, featured "mini revolutions" over its predecessor. The F1 W07 Hybrid was designed to use the Mercedes-Benz PU106C Hybrid power unit, a revolution of Mercedes-Benz PU106B Hybrid power unit. The power unit consist of the upgraded version of the Mercedes-Benz PU106B Hybrid, which was introduced during the 2015 Italian Grand Prix. The power output revolution of the PU106 Hybrid power unit was estimated around 950 horsepower (710 kW) to 1,000 horsepower (750 kW) which had more power than Ferrari 059/5, Renault R.E.16 and Honda RA616H.

=== In-season development ===
The team went on improving the F1 W07 Hybrid over the course of the season. "S-duct" remains evolved by Mercedes for improving airflow efficiency from the front of the car to the back of the chassis without major disruption. Several improvements were made during the Canadian Grand Prix, "L-shaped turning vanes" were introduced under the chassis and beside the bargeboards, front wing fins were added to better direct airflow on the outside of the car’s front wheels.

A bowl-shaped rear wing was also introduced during the 2016 Canadian Grand Prix, to allow top speeds in excess of 350 kilometres per hour (220 mph) by reducing drag, producing higher downforce. The bowl-shaped rear wing was seen similar in 2015 known as curve rear wing and was used at the back-to-back race – the European Grand Prix. To enhance the control of ride height and roll, Mercedes tried an innovative design during Singapore Grand Prix by having hydraulic third suspension element housed transversely in the upper chassis bulkhead. Revised brakes discs with concave surface was seen developed along the season, by dissipating heat efficiently and keeping tyre temperatures consistent.

== Launch, pre-season and in-season testing ==
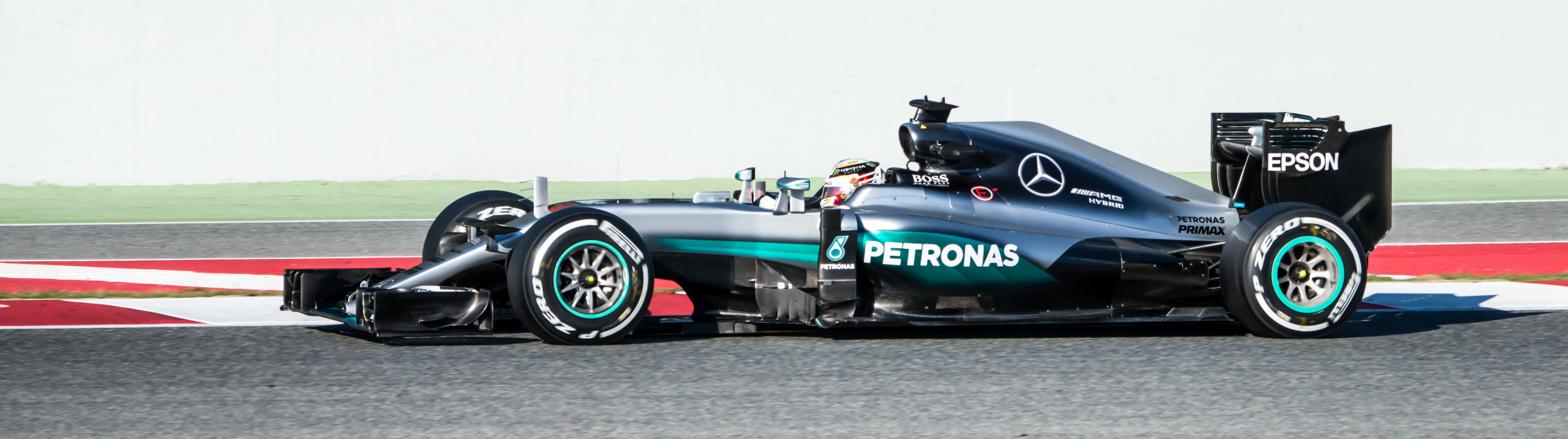
Hamilton drove the F1 W07 Hybrid during 2016 F1 pre-season testing.

The Mercedes F1 W07 Hybrid was unofficially launched at the Silverstone Circuit with Rosberg and Hamilton completing an inaugural shakedown during a promotional event on 19 February 2016. The car was driven a total of 98.2 km. The F1 W07 Hybrid was officially launched online on 21 February 2016, one day before the 2016 inaugural pre-season testing. The F1 W07 Hybrid took part in pre-season testing at Circuit de Barcelona-Catalunya on February 22–25 and March 1–4. During the eight testing days, the car completed 1294 laps; a total of 6,024 km (3,743.1 mi), equivalent to over 19 race distances. The car was also driven by 2015 GP3 Series champion Esteban Ocon and Manor Racing's regular driver Pascal Wehrlein during in-season testing.

== Competitiveness and performance ==
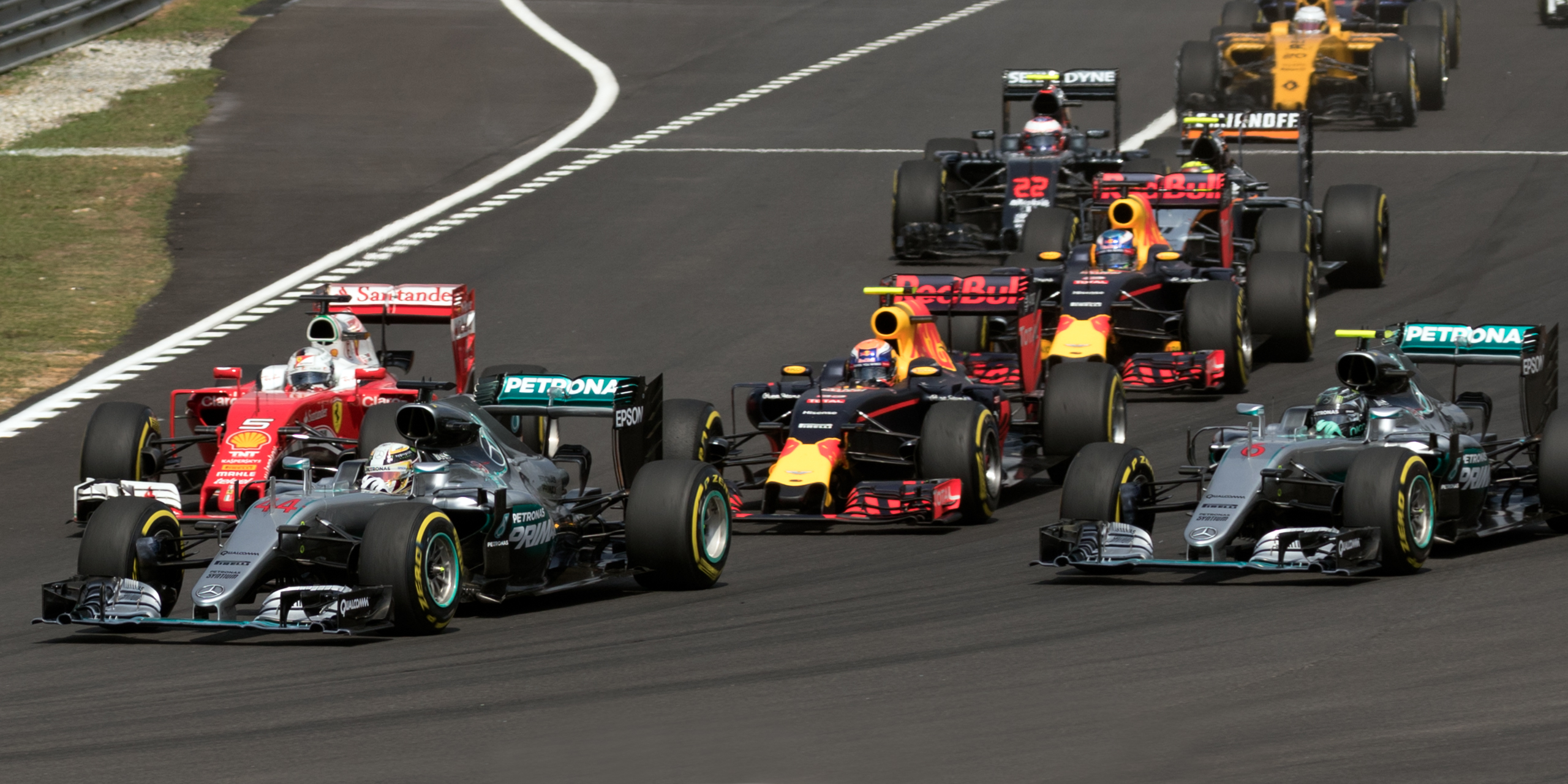
Opening lap of the Malaysian Grand Prix, right before the collision between Vettel and Rosberg

Having "mini revolutions" over its 2 predecessors; - the F1 W05 Hybrid and F1 W06 Hybrid, the F1 W07 Hybrid continued to enjoy the same immense success that Mercedes had taken since 2014. At the halfway point of the season, Mercedes had secured all but one win – the Spanish Grand Prix, won by Red Bull's Max Verstappen, where the two Mercedes drivers collided on the opening lap, immediately sending both men into retirement – and one pole – the Monaco Grand Prix, where Red Bull's Daniel Ricciardo took pole position due to technical gremlins affecting both drivers during Q3. The car took ten consecutive wins – from the 2016 Monaco Grand Prix to the 2016 Singapore Grand Prix, just one win shy of the record held by McLaren during the 1988 Formula One season.

For Mercedes, the win at the Mexican Grand Prix marked the 17th triumph in 19 races. With that tally, the F1 W07 Hybrid broke the previous record from its predecessors of 16 wins in a single season, set in both 2014 and 2015. At the next race, the Brazilian Grand Prix, Hamilton secured a record 19th pole position for the team in the season, beating the previous record of 18 poles in a season, achieved in 2011 (Red Bull), 2014 and 2015 (both Mercedes). In twenty-one races, the F1 W07 Hybrid took nineteen wins (ten for Hamilton and nine for Rosberg), twenty pole positions (twelve for Hamilton and eight for Rosberg), nine fastest laps (three for Hamilton and six for Rosberg), fourteen front row lockouts and eight 1–2 finishes, earning 765 constructors' points. The team clinched their third consecutive Constructors' Championship at the Japanese Grand Prix, the 17th race of the season with four races to spare.

=== Performance issues ===
Poor getaways at the start of the race and reliability issues troubled Mercedes throughout the season. The poor starts issue was deemed to be a hardware problem related to clutch warming. It occurred at various races including the Australian, Bahrain, German, Italian and Japanese Grands Prix. Reoccurring power unit issues were suffered at the Chinese, Russian, Monaco and British Grands Prix. The most notable reliability problem arose during the Malaysian Grand Prix, where Hamilton's engine failed and he retired from the lead.

== Season summary ==
=== Opening rounds ===
Hamilton took pole position for the season-opening Australian Grand Prix, ahead of teammate Rosberg, in the first use of a new qualifying format. During the race, both Mercedes cars suffered poor starts compared to the Ferraris of Sebastian Vettel and Kimi Räikkönen. A violent accident resulting from a collision between Fernando Alonso and Esteban Gutiérrez on lap 19 caused a red flag. Mercedes took the opportunity to use a tyre strategy which relegated Vettel to third place, completing a 1–2 finish. Hamilton took pole position again at the Bahrain Grand Prix, ahead of Rosberg. Rosberg had a better start in the race than Hamilton and passed him into the lead, whilst Hamilton had contact with Williams' Valtteri Bottas at turn one, dropping to ninth on the opening lap. Rosberg went on to win the race, while Hamilton fought his way back to secure third.

Rosberg took his first pole position in the Chinese Grand Prix. Hamilton had suffered reliability issues with the Motor Generator Unit–Heat (MGU-H), making him unable to set a lap time in qualifying. Rosberg took his third consecutive win in 2016 ahead of Sebastian Vettel, with teammate Hamilton fighting his way back from 22nd to seventh. Rosberg claimed his first career Grand Slam (pole position, fastest lap, led every lap and win during the same race), at the Russian Grand Prix, while Hamilton again suffered reliability issues during qualifying, fighting back from 10th to secure a 1–2 finish for the team during the race.

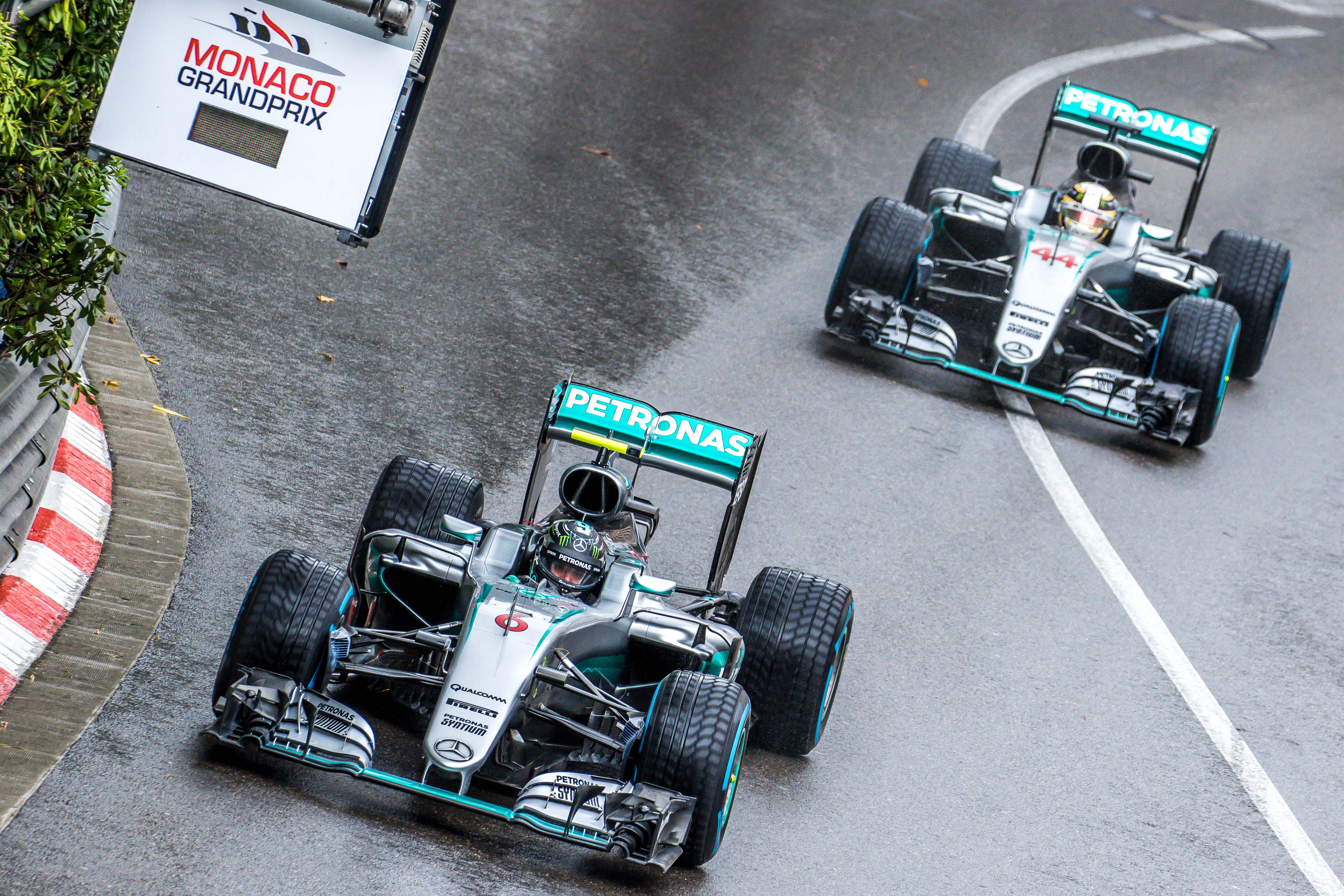
Mercedes's duo battling during the Monaco Grand Prix

Hamilton and Rosberg locked out the front row once again at the Spanish Grand Prix, with Hamilton taking his third pole of the season. On the first lap of the race, Rosberg had a slightly better start and overtook Hamilton on the outside of Turn 1. On the run down to Turn 4, Rosberg realized he was on the wrong engine mode which caused him to slow down and he quickly corrected it, Hamilton, at the same time, seeing a gap, rapidly closed on Rosberg and made an overtaking maneuver. Rosberg immediately closed the gap but it was too late, Hamilton was pushed into the grass, spun at high speed and collided with Rosberg sending both of them into the gravel trap leading to Mercedes' first double retirement since the 2011 Australian Grand Prix, thus ending any hope of a perfect season. Mercedes lost out on pole position at Monaco Grand Prix due to technical gremlins affecting both drivers. Changeable condition from wet to dry saw Hamilton take his first win in 2016 by beating Daniel Ricciardo (who suffered after a pitstop in which the tyres were not ready), while Rosberg struggled from start to finish due to suspected glazed brakes, finishing in 7th.

At the Canadian Grand Prix, Hamilton took pole position by 61 hundredths of a second with Rosberg on the front row. During the race, Hamilton held off Vettel to claim his fifth win in Canada. Rosberg was only able to manage 5th after first-corner contact with his teammate and a late-race puncture. Having completed one-third of the season, Mercedes had a 76-point lead over their closest rivals, Ferrari.

=== European rounds ===
Coming to the newly revived European Grand Prix held at Baku City Circuit, Rosberg took his second career Grand Slam while Hamilton qualified tenth due to an error during qualifying, finishing the race in fifth with an incorrect pre-set hybrid deployment mode costing him time.

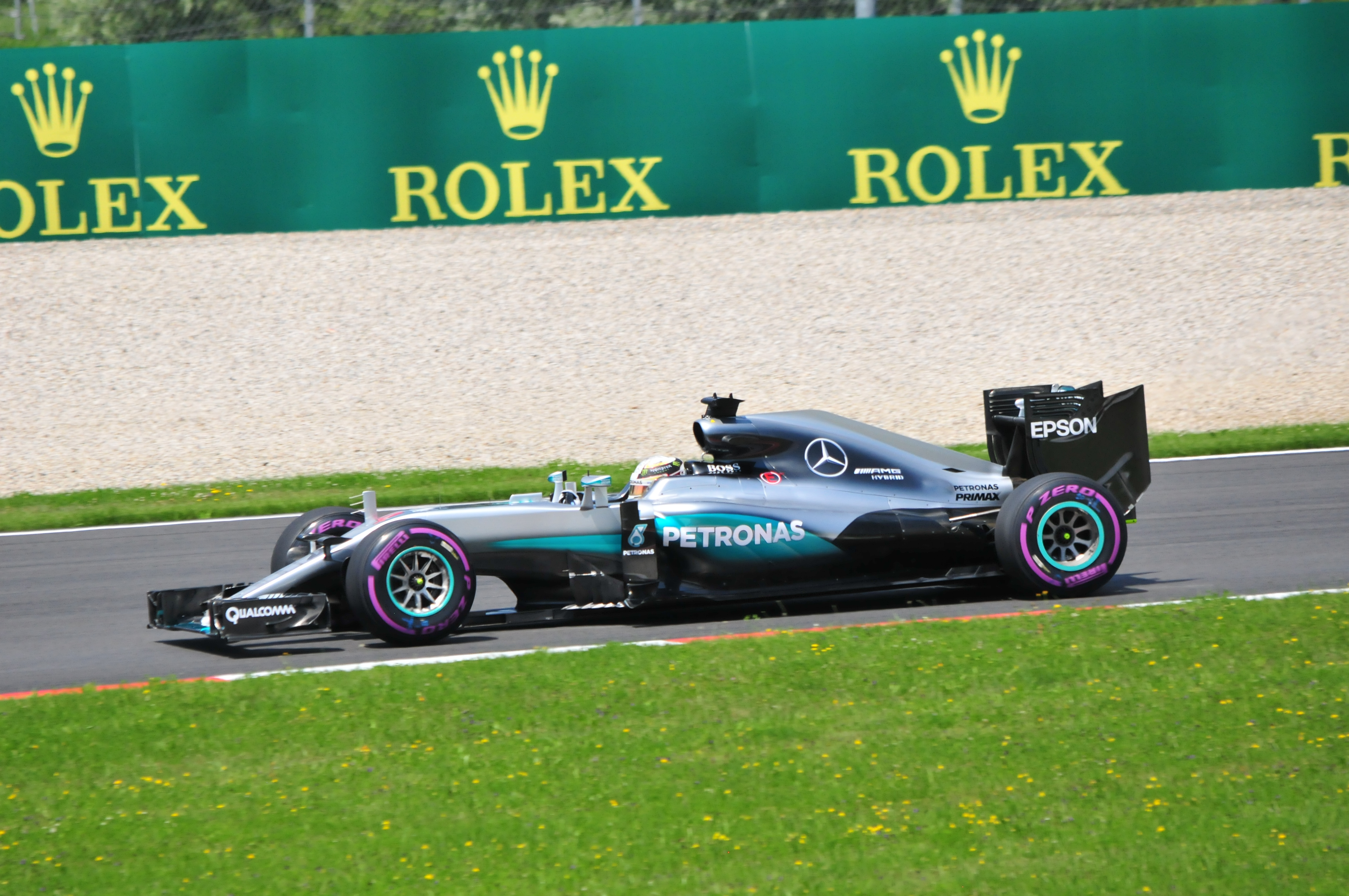
Hamilton won the Austrian Grand Prix following a collision with Rosberg on the race's last lap.

At the ninth round of the season – Austrian Grand Prix, Hamilton took his 10th career hat-trick as the Mercedes pair collided during the last lap, with Rosberg limping home for fourth with a seriously damaged car. Following the collision, Mercedes introduced a new driver management policy – "Rules of Engagement", dictating the terms by which Hamilton and Rosberg could race one another and promising penalties in the event of on-track altercations. Hamilton won his third consecutive British Grand Prix from pole position, a record at the Silverstone Circuit, while Rosberg holding second, suffered a critical gearbox problem during mid-race. Mercedes instructed him to reset the gearbox and to avoid using seventh gear or else risk a catastrophic failure, which prompted an investigation by the stewards for providing him with assistance. Rosberg was ultimately penalised for the radio call, having ten seconds added to his race time, which demoted him to third behind Max Verstappen.

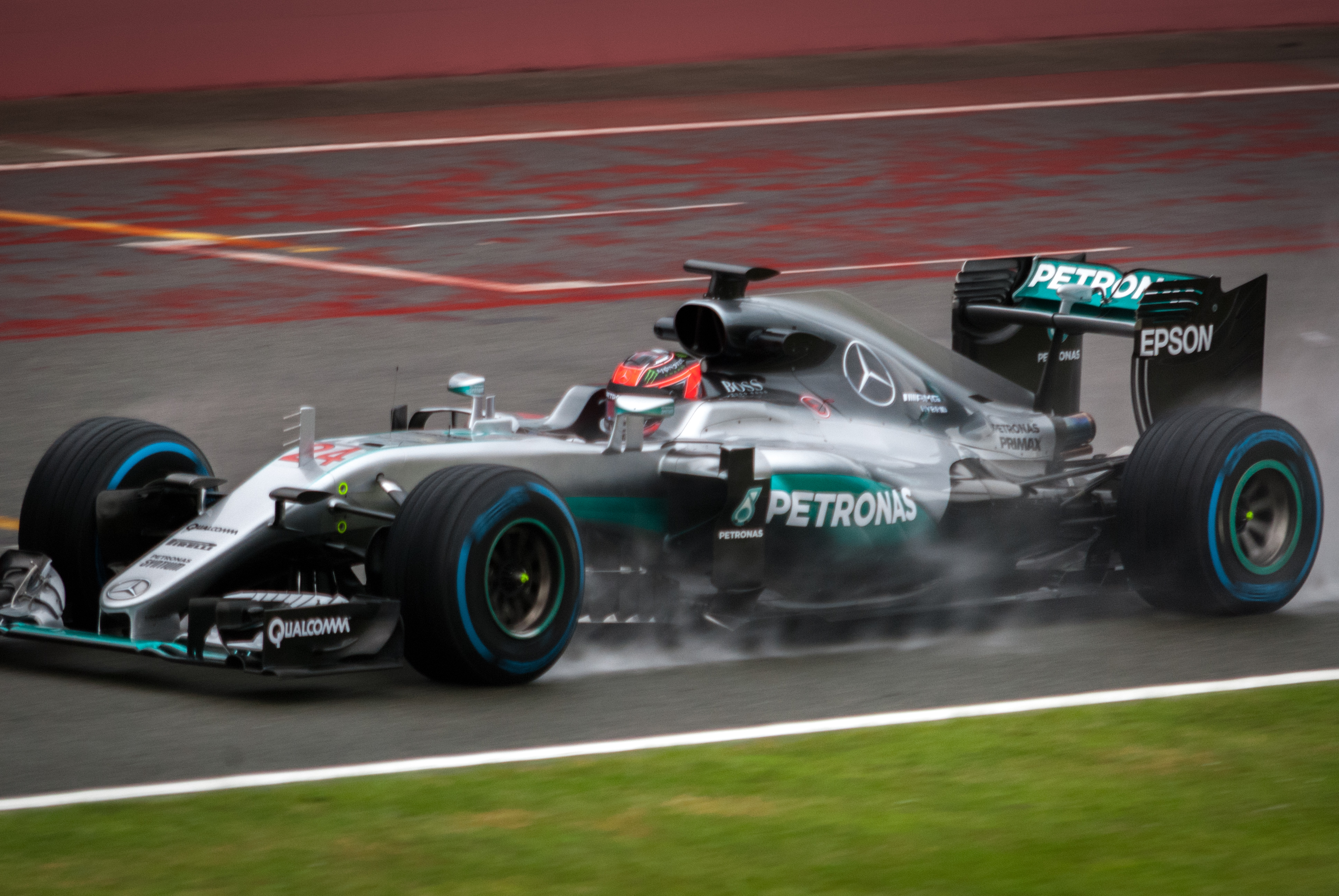
Mercedes Junior Esteban Ocon testing the F1 W07 Hybrid in July at Silverstone

Hamilton took over the lead in the Drivers' Championship after the Hungarian Grand Prix as he led Rosberg to complete a 1–2 finish, thus in succession setting a new record for the most wins in Hungary, surpassing Michael Schumacher. Hamilton took his fourth consecutive victory within a month at the German Grand Prix, heading into the summer break with a 19-point lead over his teammate. At the Belgian Grand Prix, Hamilton took 60 grid penalties for exceeding his season allocation of engine components, therefore starting at the back of the grid, whilst Rosberg took pole position. Eventually, Rosberg won his first Belgian Grand Prix by leading from start to finish, while Hamilton fought his way up to claim 3rd – thereby making him the first driver to start 20th or lower and finish on the podium on three occasions. At the Italian Grand Prix, Rosberg claimed his seventh win of the season after Hamilton lost the lead due to a poor start but recovered to finish second, thus making it the fourth 1-2 finish for the team in the season. As a result, Rosberg narrowed Hamilton's lead in the driver's championship to only 2 points. Having completed two-thirds of the season, Mercedes had a 208-point lead over their nearest competitors - Red Bull Racing.

=== Non-European rounds ===
At the Singapore Grand Prix, Rosberg took back the Drivers' Championship lead over Hamilton when he won his third consecutive race and eighth overall after fending off a late charge by Ricciardo in the closing laps. Hamilton, despite having brake temperature problems, was able to claim the final spot on the podium by keeping Räikkönen at bay.

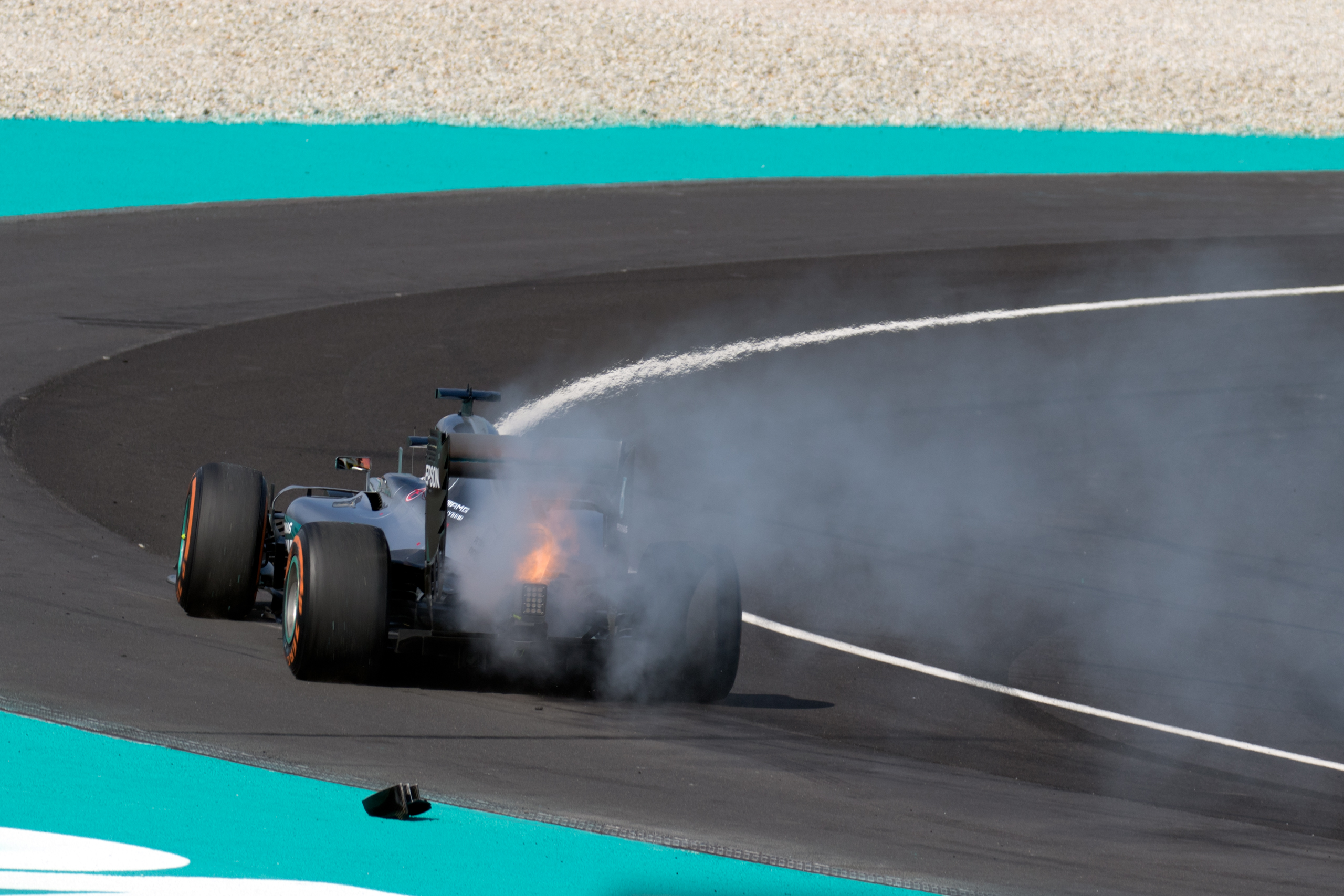
Hamilton suffered an engine failure during the Malaysian Grand Prix and retired from the lead.

A major twist in the Drivers' Championship occurred at the Malaysian Grand Prix. Hamilton, while leading, suffered an engine failure which led to a Red Bull 1–2 finish. Rosberg dropped to 17th due to a first lap collision with Vettel but recovered to finish in third which extended his lead in the championship to 23 points over Hamilton with five races remaining. At the Japanese Grand Prix, Hamilton started poorly and dropped from second to eighth place, but recovered to finish third, while Rosberg got away cleanly from the start and won the race from pole position, making this his ninth win of the season. The first and third places also secured Mercedes' 3rd Constructors' title in a row. At the United States Grand Prix, Hamilton took his seventh win of the season from pole position. It was his first win since the German Grand Prix before the summer break and his 50th Grand Prix career victory. He became only the third F1 driver in history to reach 50 Grand Prix victories, trailing only Alain Prost (51) and Michael Schumacher (91). Rosberg initially lost out to Daniel Ricciardo at the start but he was able to retake the second position due to a "free" pitstop under a Virtual Safety Car (VSC) on lap 31, which was caused by the retirement of Max Verstappen. Both drivers went on to complete a fifth 1-2 finish for the team in the season.

At the Mexican Grand Prix, Hamilton took pole position while Rosberg secured the twelfth front row lockout for the team by beating Verstappen and Ricciardo on his final run. Both drivers managed to stay ahead after the start although neither Hamilton nor Rosberg stayed on track at the first corner. Hamilton missed the braking point while a diving Verstappen made heavy wheel-to-wheel contact with Rosberg, causing both Mercedes drivers to go on to the grass. The Verstappen-Rosberg incident was reviewed by the stewards though no further action was taken. Hamilton went on to win his eighth Grand Prix of the season, Rosberg meanwhile had to defend his position from a charging Verstappen. On lap 49, Verstappen had a go at Rosberg who lost time by going over a curb (while being behind a backmarker). Verstappen could not successfully execute his move, however, and Rosberg managed to keep his second position until the end, completing yet another 1-2 finish for the team. Meanwhile, Hamilton won his 51st Grand Prix which saw him tie Alain Prost for second most career victories on the all-time list. Hamilton's win in Mexico also gave Mercedes their seventeenth win of the season, setting a new Formula 1 record for most team wins in a single season, breaking their own record of 16 wins in each of the previous two seasons.

Hamilton took his maiden victory at the Autódromo José Carlos Pace after starting on pole position at the penultimate race – Brazilian Grand Prix, while Rosberg survived a near-spin due to wet weather conditions, gave Mercedes their seventh 1-2 finish of the season. With this wet-weather masterclass victory, Hamilton set a new record for wins at the most different circuits (24) and moved ahead of Alain Prost on the list of all-time wins. Moreover, he also kept his Drivers' Championship chances alive, setting up a title decider between the Mercedes duo at the Abu Dhabi Grand Prix – a repeat of the 2014 Drivers' Championship showdown at the Yas Marina Circuit.

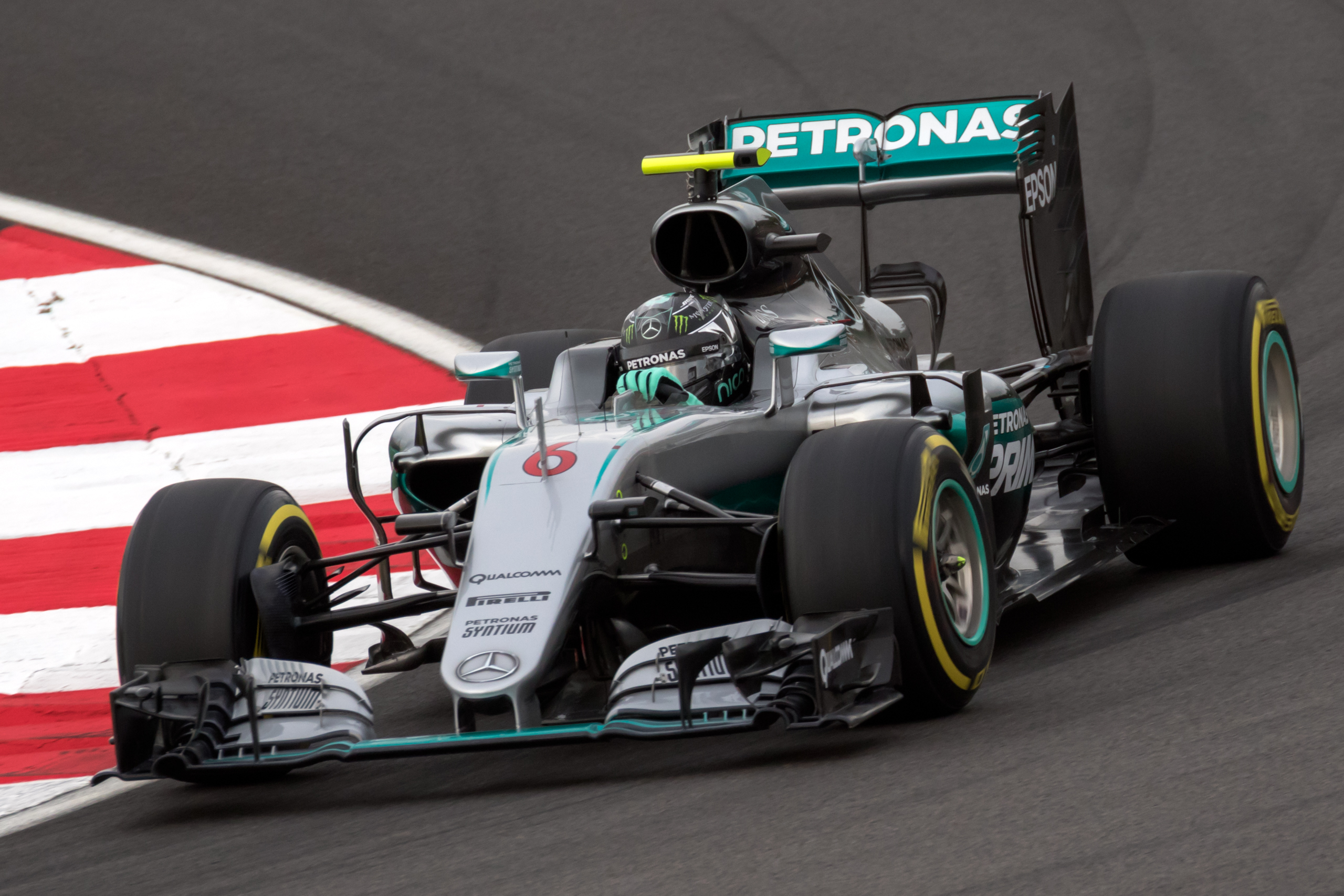
Rosberg drove the F1 W07 Hybrid which clinched his first World Drivers' Championship title.

At the final race of the 2016 season, the title rivals took their 14th front-row lockout with Hamilton having out qualified championship leader Rosberg by one-third of a second. During the race, both Mercedes started well and maintained their respective positions. Hamilton moved clear from the field while Rosberg had a lengthy pit stop for preventing an unsafe release, thus critically losing a position to Verstappen. Rosberg followed Verstappen for the next 12 laps before finally slicing past the Red Bull. Rosberg then set numerous fastest laps to cut down Hamilton's advantage, while Hamilton, in his bid to secure his fourth title, tried to back his teammate up into the clutch of Verstappen. Vettel joined the group by using alternative strategy – using fresh supersoft tyres, he then made a pass on Verstappen for a podium position, thus separating Hamilton, Rosberg, himself, and Verstappen by less than three seconds. Hamilton was told numerous times via team radio to speed up due to risk of jeopardising the win. Hamilton ignored and disobeyed team radio instructions, arguing that his team should "let us race", and continued backing his teammate up. Eventually, Hamilton took the chequered flag by 0.4s from Rosberg, while Rosberg defended well from the fast coming Vettel by another 0.4s, while Verstappen took fourth, just 0.8s behind Vettel. From this result, Hamilton took his tenth win of the season but had lost the Drivers' Championship by five points. (Hamilton: 380 points; as compared to Rosberg: 385 points), therefore Rosberg was crowned as the 2016 Formula One World Drivers' Champion, his maiden and only title.

=== Final standings ===
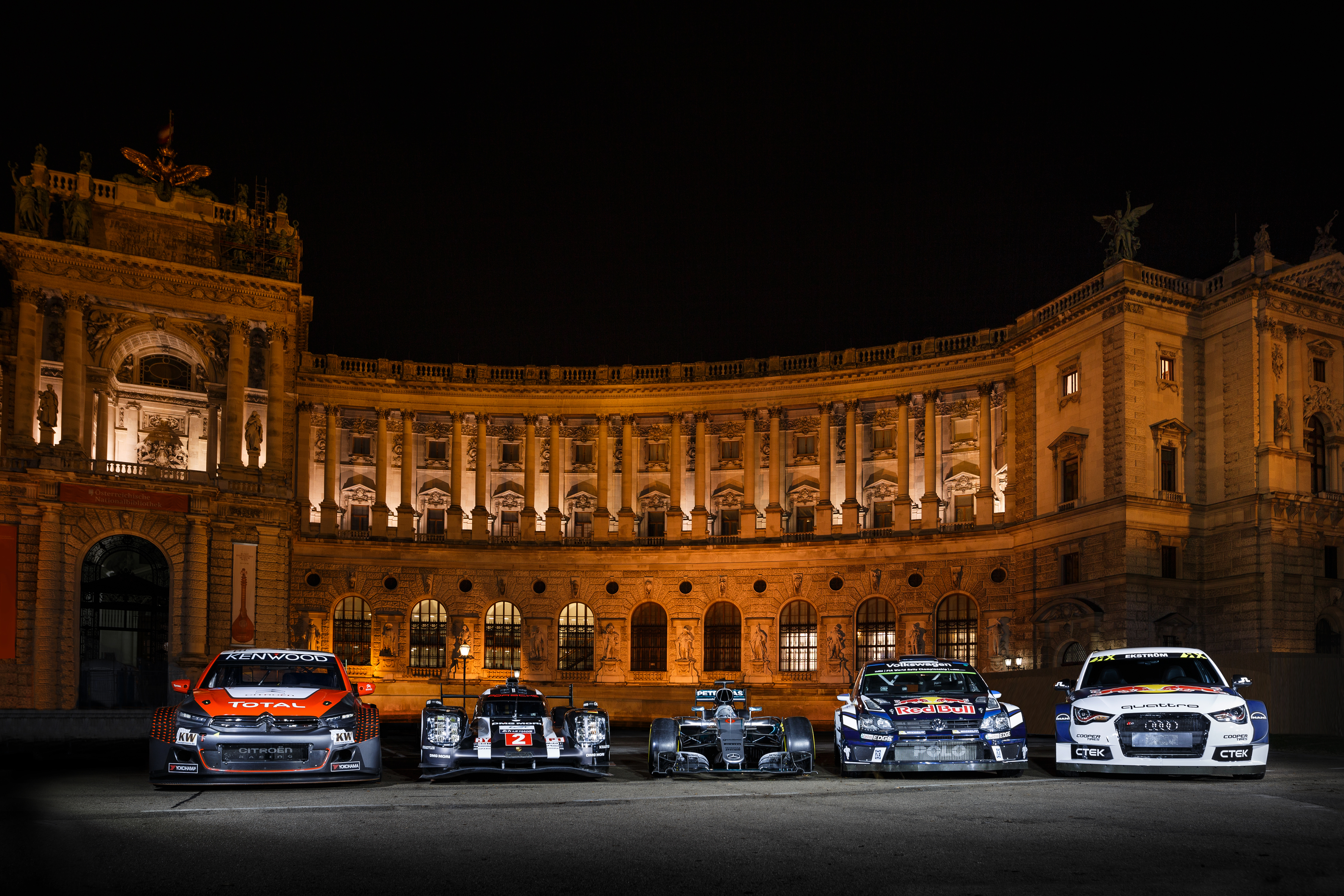
Mercedes F1 W07 Hybrid – One of the 2016 FIA World Constructors Championship Cars

The team finished the season with 765 constructors championship points, breaking their own record again of 703 points set at the previous season for most constructor points in a single season. Furthermore, it had also defeated the nearest rivals – Red Bull by 297 points, the highest difference on points between world constructor's champion and the runner-up in the sport's 67th year of history. In addition, Mercedes ultimately claimed the Drivers' Championship and Constructors' Championship title double for the third consecutive season.

== Formula One records ==
As of December 2024, the F1 W07 Hybrid holds the following Formula One records:

- Most pole positions in a season with highest percentage: 20 pole positions (95.2%)
- Most podiums in a season: 33 podiums

== Complete Formula One results ==
(key) (results in bold indicate pole position; results in italics indicate fastest lap)

Year	Entrant	Engine	Tyres	Drivers	Grands Prix																					Points	WCC
Year	Entrant	Engine	Tyres	Drivers	AUS	BHR	CHN	RUS	ESP	MON	CAN	EUR	AUT	GBR	HUN	GER	BEL	ITA	SIN	MAL	JPN	USA	MEX	BRA	ABU	Points	WCC
2016	Mercedes AMG; Petronas F1 Team	Mercedes-Benz PU106C Hybrid	**P**	Nico Rosberg	1	1	**1**	**1**	Ret	7	5	**1**	4	3	**2**	**4**	**1**	1	**1**	3	**1**	2	2	2	2	**765**	**1st**
2016	Mercedes AMG; Petronas F1 Team	Mercedes-Benz PU106C Hybrid	**P**	Lewis Hamilton	**2**	**3**	7	2	**Ret**	1	**1**	5	**1**	**1**	1	1	3	**2**	3	**Ret**	3	**1**	**1**	**1**	**1**	**765**	**1st**

== See also ==
- Mercedes-AMG Project One (Related road car development)

Awards
Preceded by Mercedes F1 W06 Hybrid	Autosport; Racing Car of the Year; 2016	Succeeded by Mercedes AMG F1 W08 EQ Power+
