= Nira Juanco =

Spanish sports journalist and television presenter (born 1978)

- Born: Nira Juanco Alonso; 3 September 1978 (age 47); Las Palmas, Canary Islands, Spain
- Occupations: Sports journalist; Television presenter
- Years active: 2004-presenter
- Spouses: Jaume Sallares (m. 2013; div. 2016) Fernando Meco (m. 2022)
- Children: 2

Nira Juanco Alonso (born 3 September 1978) is a Spanish sports journalist and television presenter. A graduate of the University of Las Palmas de Gran Canaria and the Charles III University of Madrid, she began her broadcasting career with Localia Televisión before going to CNN+, Telecinco and LaSexta. Juanco began working as a pit lane reporter for LaSexta's coverage of Formula One motor racing in 2009 and moved to Antena 3 in 2012. She moved to the pay-TV channel Canal F1 Latin America, as a presenter in 2015 and moved to the GOL PLAY network in 2018. Juanco presented the daily sports news programme La prórroga de El Golazo until she moved to DAZN presenting its Formula One coverage in 2021 before becoming DAZN F1's deputy director in 2022.

== Biography ==
Juanco was born at Las Palmas, Canary Islands on 3 September 1978. She grew up in Santa Brígida, and is a graduate of both the University of Las Palmas de Gran Canaria with a degree in law and the Charles III University of Madrid with a degree in journalism; she moved universities because she did not like law, which she chose without much thought because her parents wanted her to study a degree, and wanted a job that would put her more in touch with people. During her time at university, Juanco did a summer internship at the La Provincia/Diario de Las Palmas newspaper and also interned with COPE Asturias.

In 2004, upon the completion of her studies, she began working in television as the presenter of the national news bulletin for Localia Televisión through the Madrid Press Association's Primer Empleo programme. From there, Juanco obtained a scholarship to read the news on weekends at the news channel CNN+. She then spent two months working on the morning news programme on Telecinco as an editor. In 2006, Juanco received a telephone call to work as part of the sports editorial team on a sports programme for LaSexta and remained there until 2009. In March 2009, she began working as a pit lane reporter and preview presenter for LaSexta's coverage of Formula One motor racing. Juanco's bosses were aware she was passionate about motorsport, having covered the GP2 Series in 2008 by making and editing fifteen-minute preview films, and she became the first woman to report on Formula One on Spanish television. Her first broadcast was at the 2009 Australian Grand Prix. Three years later, Antena 3 took over the Spanish broadcast rights to Formula One and Juanco joined the broadcaster's team for its coverage of the sport.

In 2015, she moved to Canal F1 Latin America, a pay-TV channel created by Mediapro to broadcast Formula One in Latin America, to work as a presenter. Juanco left Antena 3 because she had become tired of the constant travelling to races and wanted to devote her self more to her family. She was replaced at Antena 3 by Lucía Villalón. She was the presenter of the six-part Movistar Plus+ documentary travel series Guardianes de la Historia in 2016, combining her Formula One broadcasting work with filming of the series. Following the closure of Canal F1 Latin America in 2018 when Mediapro did not renew its contract to broadcast Formula One, Juanco signed a contract with the GOL PLAY network in 2018. She became the presenter of the La prórroga de El Golazo daily sports news programme in February 2018. Juanco lent her voice to the FIFA 21 football video game by EA Sports for its career and UEFA Champions League modes, becoming the series's first woman commentator; she was heard only in the Spanish edition. She was approached for the role prior to the Spanish lockdown for the COVID-19 pandemic and began recording her lines in May 2020.

She moved to DAZN in 2021 to become the presenter and content editor of its Formula One coverage when the streaming service took over the Spanish broadcasting rights. Before the 2022 season, Juanco was promoted to the role of deputy director of DAZN F1 and was replaced as presenter by Noemí de Miguel. In 2023, her first book, El gran circo de la Fórmula 1, was published. Juanco left DAZN in early 2024, and in October 2024, she was employed by IFEMA Madrid to become its head of content and communications for the Formula One Grand Prix in Madrid. She has also worked as a columnist for El Mundo.

== Personal life ==
She supports Real Madrid CF. Juanco was married to the businessman Jaume Sallares from May 2013 to 2016. She married her second husband, the SAS España marketing director Fernando Meco, in July 2022. Juanco has two children with her second husband.
