= 2016 Austrian Grand Prix =

Ninth round of the 2016 Formula One World Championship

Race 9 of 21 in the 2016 Formula One World Championship
← Previous race	Next race →
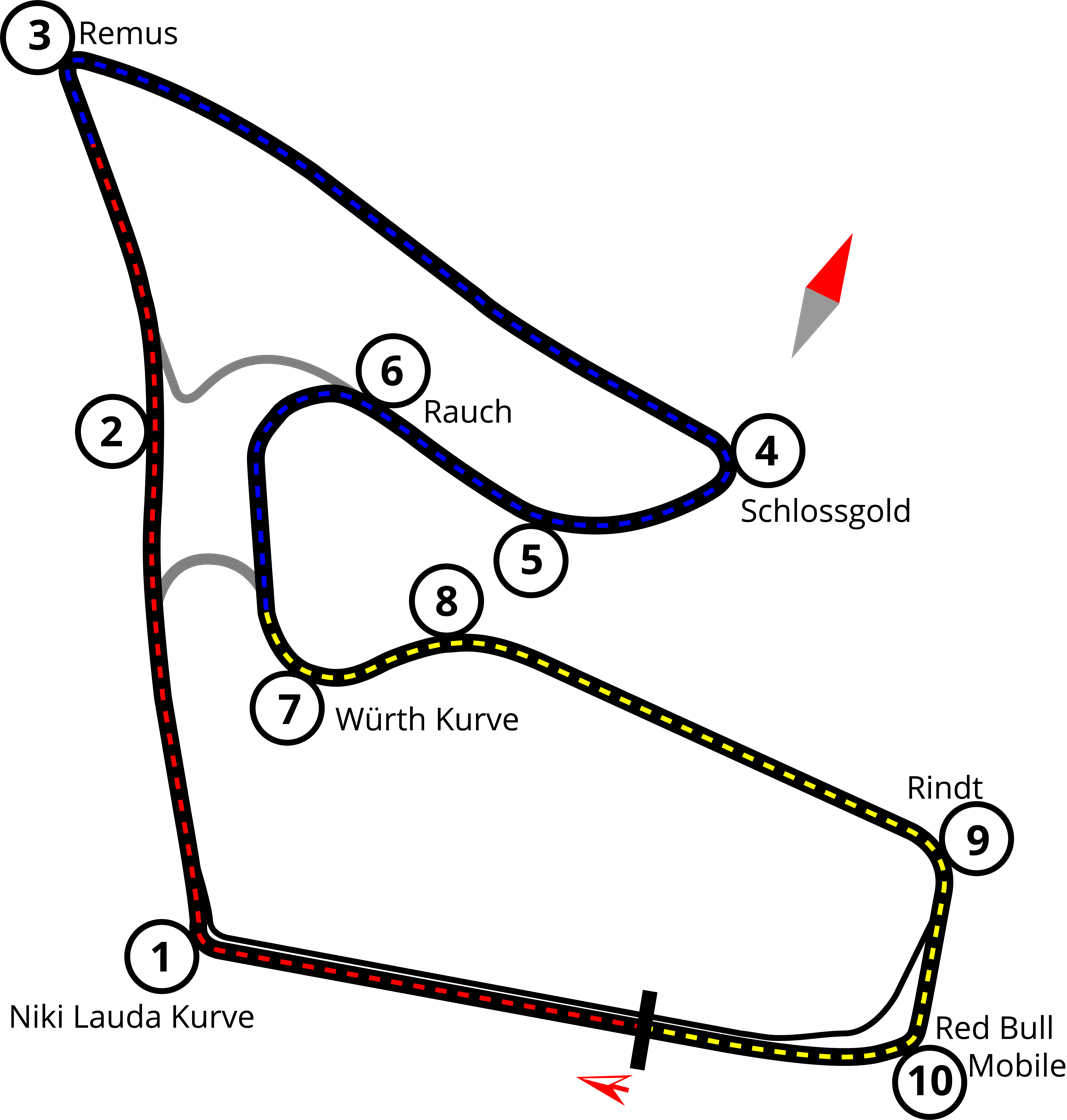
- Layout of the Red Bull Ring

Race details
- Date: 3 July 2016
- Official name: Formula 1 Pirelli Grosser Preis von Österreich 2016
- Location: Red Bull Ring; Spielberg, Styria, Austria
- Course: Permanent racing facility
- Course length: 4.326 km (2.684 miles)
- Distance: 71 laps, 307.146 km (190.564 miles)
- Weather: Cloudy
- Attendance: 85,000 (Weekend)

Pole position
Driver	(United Kingdom) Lewis Hamilton	Mercedes
- Time: 1:07.922

Fastest lap
Driver	(United Kingdom) Lewis Hamilton	Mercedes
- Time: 1:08.411 on lap 67

Podium
First	(United Kingdom) Lewis Hamilton	Mercedes
Second	(Netherlands) Max Verstappen	Red Bull Racing-TAG Heuer
Third	(Finland) Kimi Räikkönen	Ferrari

The 2016 Austrian Grand Prix (formally known as the Formula 1 Grosser Preis von Österreich 2016) was a Formula One motor race that was held on 3 July 2016 at the Red Bull Ring in Spielberg, Austria. The race, which was contested over 71 laps, was the ninth round of the 2016 FIA Formula One World Championship, and marked the 30th running of the Austrian Grand Prix and the 29th time it had been held as a round of the Formula One World Championship since the series inception in 1950.

Mercedes driver Nico Rosberg entered the round as the defending race winner and championship leader, with a 24-point advantage over his teammate Lewis Hamilton. Hamilton started the race from pole and went on to win the race after colliding with Rosberg on the final lap; as a result, Rosberg finished fourth behind Max Verstappen and Kimi Räikkönen, and saw his championship lead cut to eleven points. Mercedes led rivals Ferrari by 81 points in the Constructors' standings at the start of the round, extending their lead to 103 after Sebastian Vettel retired.

== Report ==
=== Background ===
==== Championship ====
Going into the weekend, Nico Rosberg was leading the Drivers' Championship with 141 points, 24 points ahead of teammate Lewis Hamilton, with Sebastian Vettel a further 21 points behind in third. In the Constructors' Championship standings, Mercedes was in the lead with 258 points, followed by Ferrari and Red Bull Racing with 177 and 140 points respectively.

==== Circuit changes ====
The circuit was resurfaced ahead of the race weekend, smoothing out many of the bumps and imperfections that had developed over time. The new surface—introduced to allow the circuit to accommodate a round of the MotoGP World Championship—saw teams projecting lap times of under 1:06.000 for the first time.

The event also saw the introduction of "baguette" kerbs, a series of low-set ridges positioned on the outside of corners designed to prevent drivers from abusing track limits by forcing them to run wide to avoid them or slow down to avoid damage. The baguette kerbs were positioned one car-width from the outside of corners to allow drivers some margin for error. Max Verstappen was critical of the changes, calling the new kerbs "dangerous" after damaging his car twice in free practice after having run over them. Others joined into the criticism, with Mercedes urging the Fédération Internationale de l'Automobile (FIA), the sport's governing body, to make changes to the kerbs.

==== Penalties ====
Following an unscheduled gearbox change made ahead of the race weekend, Sebastian Vettel received a five-place grid penalty for the race.

==== Tyres ====
Sole tyre supplier Pirelli brought the ultra-soft, supersoft and soft tyres to the event. As per the regulations of the 2016 season, every driver had to set aside one set each of the two softest compounds for the race and one set of the ultrasofts for Q3 (should they advance). The drivers had freedom of what other compounds they chose for the remaining ten out of thirteen sets.

=== Free practice ===
Per the regulations for the 2016 season, two 90-minute practice sessions were held on Friday and another 60-minute session was held before qualifying on Saturday. In the first session on Friday morning, Nico Rosberg set the fastest time at 1:07.373. The projected fast lap times were confirmed as Rosberg's time was faster than the previous fastest time set on the track by Michael Schumacher in 2003. Rosberg finished more than three-tenths of a second clear of teammate Lewis Hamilton, with Vettel and Kimi Räikkönen third and fourth respectively, the only other drivers within a second of Rosberg. There were several minor incidents during the session, including Hamilton spinning at turn 3, causing Romain Grosjean to go into a spin behind him when trying to avoid hitting him. Rosberg also went off the track at the same corner later in the session. Daniel Ricciardo posted the fifth-fastest time, but was lucky to escape a situation in which Marcus Ericsson got sideways while trying to get into the pitlane entry at turn 8. The revised kerbs of the track caught several drivers out, among them Max Verstappen who lost parts of his front wing when leaving the track at turn 8. Later on, he made contact with the kerbs again in turn 6, damaging his suspension, causing him to end the session early.

Rosberg was again fastest in the second session on Friday afternoon, setting his fastest time of 1:07.967 in the early minutes. This benchmark would stand for the rest of the session as heavy rain arrived at the circuit eight minutes in. Several drivers slid off the track as they tried to return to the pitlane, where they would remain for half an hour until the rain eased off. Ricciardo was the first to head out again on the intermediate tyres, slowly followed by the rest of the field. With under twenty minutes remaining, the track had dried out enough to use slick tyres. Behind Rosberg and Hamilton, Nico Hülkenberg set the third-fastest time, ahead of Vettel, who spun out into the gravel trap in turn 2 late in the session.

In the third session on Saturday, Sebastian Vettel set the fastest time, at 1:07.098, a little over a tenth of a second ahead of his teammate Räikkönen. Rosberg had the slowest time of the session, as he crashed out when his suspension broke after going over the kerbs at turn 2. His accident caused a ten-minute red flag period. His teammate Hamilton was third fastest, albeit running wide at turn 8 on one of his laps. Ricciardo was fourth fastest, half a second down on Vettel and one tenth of a second ahead of teammate Verstappen in fifth. Fernando Alonso, who lost parts of his bodywork when running over the kerbs late in the session, was tenth fastest, 1.2 seconds behind Vettel. Due to his crash, Mercedes had to change the gearbox on Rosberg's car, handing him a five-place grid penalty.

=== Qualifying ===
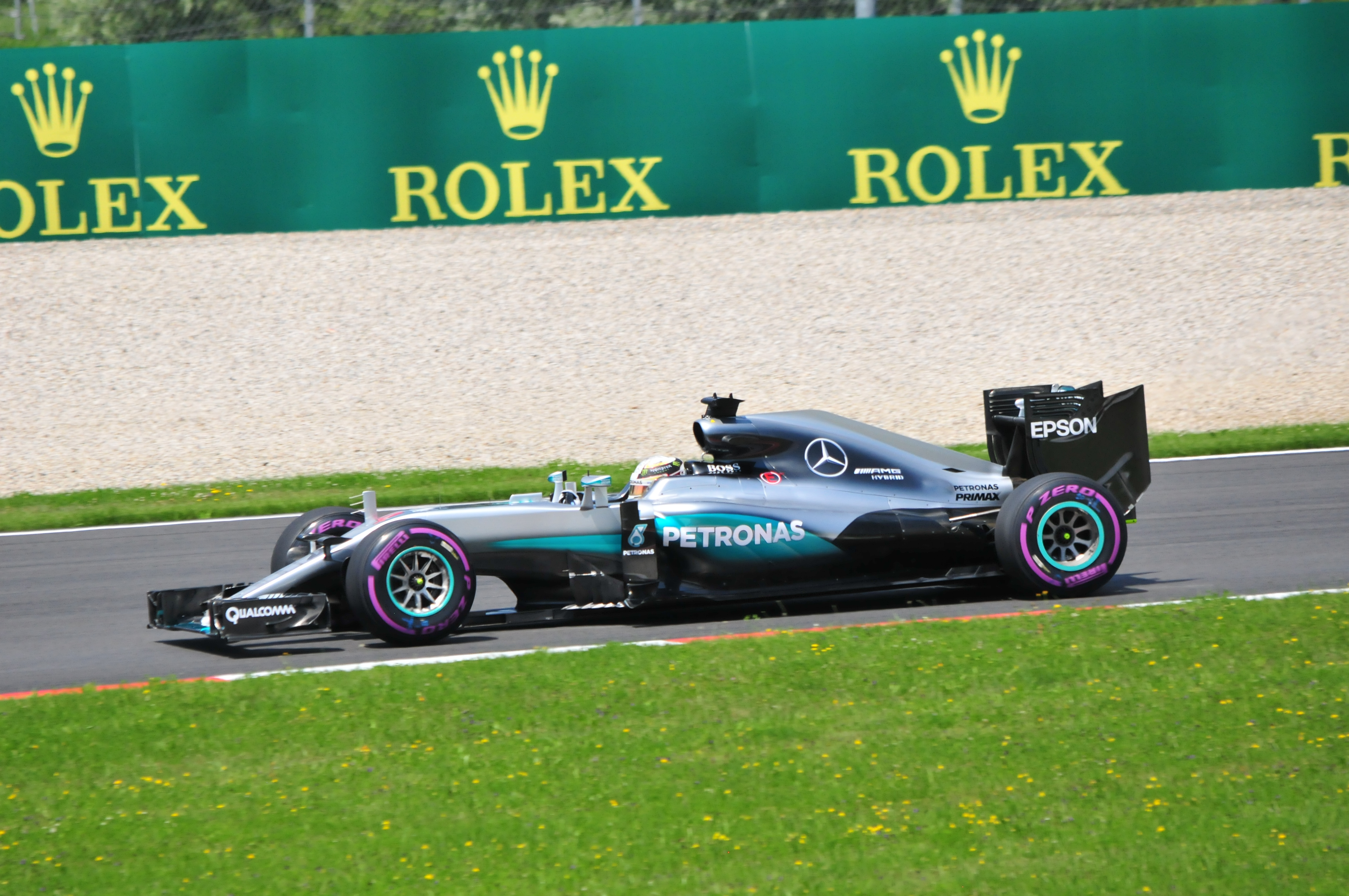
Lewis Hamilton qualified in pole position and went on to win the race.

Qualifying consisted of three parts, 18, 15 and 12 minutes in length respectively, with six drivers eliminated from competing after each of the first two sessions. Following his crash in free practice, Rosberg's car needed to be repaired and he did not get out on track in the first part of qualifying (Q1) until nine minutes before the end of the session. He nevertheless managed to set the fastest time, more than four-tenths of a second ahead of Hamilton. Pascal Wehrlein performed well for Manor, setting the tenth fastest time, just over a second off of Rosberg's time. Just as in free practice, suspension failures occurred: First it was Sergio Pérez who nursed his car back to the pit lane. Towards the end of the session, Daniil Kvyat crashed heavily following a break in his suspension in turn 7. Qualifying was red flagged as a consequence and later restarted with 1:44 minutes remaining. Nico Hülkenberg was the only driver to improve on his time, while others were prevented from improvement by Carlos Sainz Jr., who was stranded with his car off the track, causing yellow flags to be shown. Eventually, the two Sauber drivers were last, behind Kvyat and Rio Haryanto, with the two Renault cars the last to be eliminated.

Lewis Hamilton set the fastest time in Q2 at 1:06.228, the fastest time set in any session at the Red Bull Ring. However, both Ferrari and Red Bull set their fastest times in Q2 on the supersoft tyres, unlike Mercedes, who used the ultrasoft compound, meaning that both teams were able to start the race on the harder tyre. Realizing this, Mercedes tried to counter the move and sent their cars back out on supersoft tyres, but were unable to improve on their times due to rain starting to fall. Jenson Button moved into Q3, while his teammate Fernando Alonso did not, ending up 14th on the grid. In 12th place, Wehrlein equalled Manor's highest ever qualifying result, being between the two Haas drivers Esteban Gutiérrez and Romain Grosjean on the grid. Following their problems in Q1, Pérez and Sainz were unable to set a time and were thus eliminated.

Due to the rain that had fallen, the drivers went out on track on intermediate tyres at the beginning of Q3. On these tyres, Hamilton set the fastest time, followed by Button and Ricciardo. The track dried quickly however, and soon the cars returned to the pit lane to switch to slick tyres. Hülkenberg twice set the fastest time, but was beaten to pole position by Hamilton. Rosberg went faster as well, but lost his second place on the grid to Hülkenberg due to his five-place grid penalty. Vettel went fourth fastest, but was relegated as well, handing third on the grid to Button, who had set the fifth fastest time. Räikkönen, Ricciardo, Valtteri Bottas, Verstappen and Felipe Massa rounded up the top ten. It was Hülkenberg's second front row start of his career, the first having been his pole position at the 2010 Brazilian Grand Prix.

=== Race ===
Before the lights went on for the start, Pascal Wehrlein came to a halt in the wrong grid slot, having mistakenly taken the spot left vacant by Massa, who was starting from the pitlane. Wehrlein was able to reverse into his slot one row behind just half a second before the start light procedure started, avoiding a penalty. At the start, Hamilton got away well from pole position while Hülkenberg lost ground. Button was second as Rosberg moved ahead of Ricciardo and Verstappen. Having gotten a new car built overnight, Daniil Kvyat retired at the end of lap two, after having started from the pitlane. On lap six, Rosberg got ahead of Hülkenberg in fourth position, while Verstappen took advantage and overtook Hülkenberg as well. Räikkönen got ahead of Button into second on lap seven. Tyre stops started on lap nine, as Hülkenberg and Alonso were the first to come in, followed by Button one lap later. After Gutiérrez came past him into ninth on lap 12, Massa headed for the pitlane as well. As Wehrlein made a pit stop on lap 14, Hamilton was still in the lead, followed by Räikkönen and Rosberg.

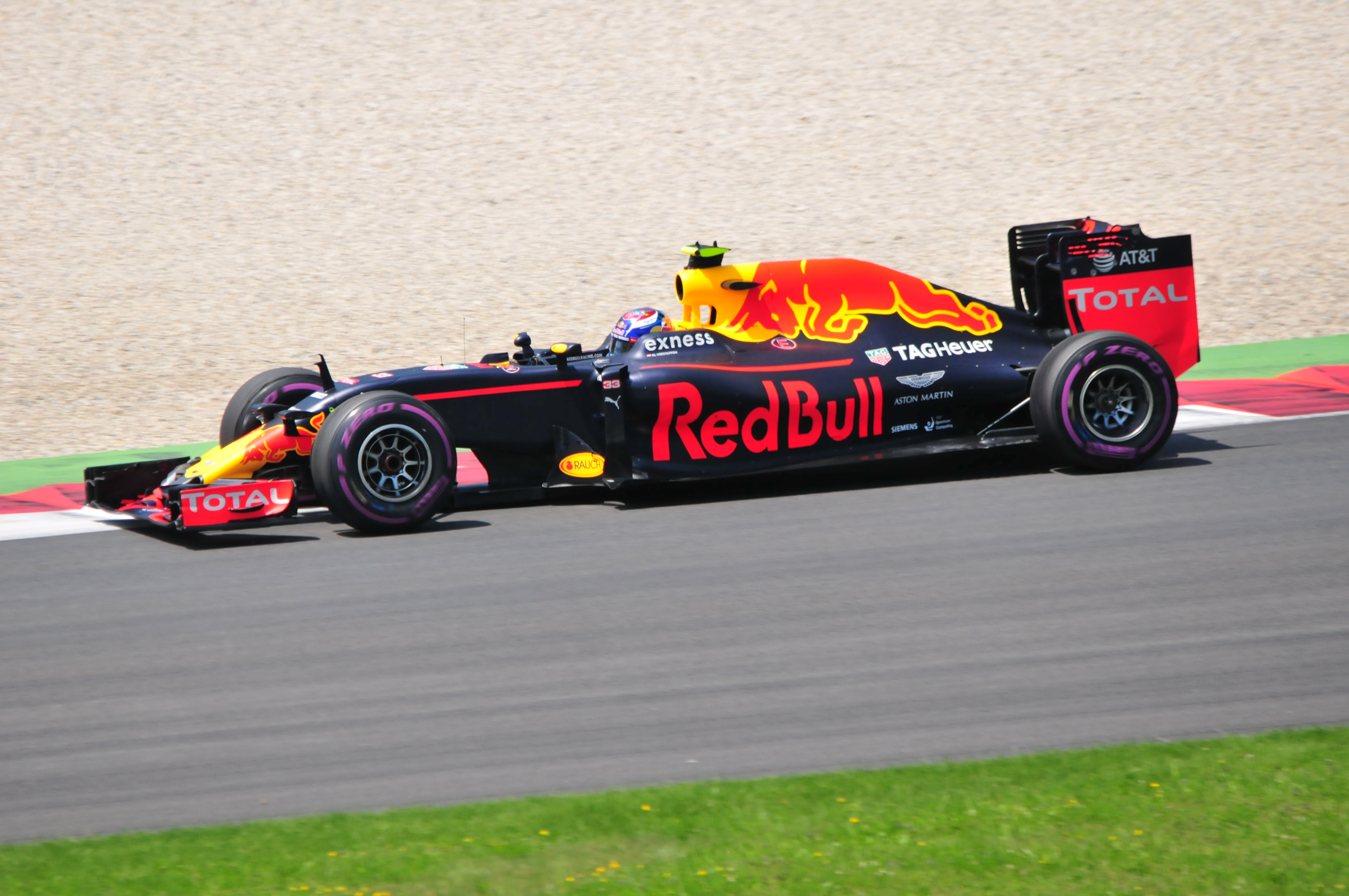
Max Verstappen qualified only ninth but fought his way up to second in the race.

Nico Rosberg made his pit stop shortly thereafter, putting on the soft compound tyre, while Hamilton stayed out. In the meantime, Vettel had moved up into third place, right behind his teammate Räikkönen. Hamilton came into the pitlane on lap 22, and problems with his stop saw him lose position to Rosberg. Räikkönen briefly led the race but followed suit one lap later and made a pit stop, only to come out behind both Red Bull drivers. More trouble was ahead for Ferrari, as Vettel, who was in the lead at that point, retired on lap 27, when he crashed into the barriers after his rear right tyre had exploded. This incident sent the safety car out, bringing the field back together. Rosberg was now leading the race from Hamilton, Verstappen, Ricciardo and Räikkönen.

The safety car came back in on lap 32, with Rosberg leading the field at the flying restart, quickly pulling out a two-second advantage over Hamilton. Sergio Pérez was the winner of the restart, moving up three places into 11th and moving up another position several laps later. On lap 39, Button moved ahead of Felipe Nasr into seventh position. After keeping the gap at around two seconds for a number of laps, a mistake by Rosberg saw Hamilton close back up to him, allowing him to use the drag reduction system to attempt an overtake manoeuvre. Several drivers decided to change tyres for a second time around lap 50, including Valtteri Bottas on lap 52, while Nico Hülkenberg took his third stop a lap before, serving a five-second time penalty for speeding in the pitlane in the process. On lap 55, Hamilton was the first of the leading duo to come in for a pitstop, followed by Rosberg a lap later. A quicker stop for Rosberg and a mistake by Hamilton on his lap after pitting saw Rosberg emerge from his stop ahead. Verstappen was in the lead, soon followed closely by the two Mercedes drivers. On lap 58, Räikkönen overtook Ricciardo for fourth place, while Verstappen was staying in the lead with soft compound tyres he fitted on lap 15. He lost the lead to Rosberg however on lap 61, with Hamilton getting past him as well soon after. As the Mercedes duo battled for the race win, several drivers retired in the closing stages of the race, including Hülkenberg and Massa. Räikkönen was closing in to Verstappen in third, while Pascal Wehrlein edged closer to Bottas in tenth place as well. On the last lap, Hamilton attempted to overtake Rosberg into turn two, but Rosberg turned into the corner late on the inside and impacted Hamilton's car, damaging Rosberg's front wing and pushing Hamilton off the track. They almost touched again as Hamilton rejoined the track. Hamilton eventually got ahead into turn three as Rosberg nursed his damaged car to the finish line. He was relegated to fourth position as both Verstappen and Räikkönen moved past him over the course of the lap. Further behind, Pérez retired, elevating Wehrlein into the last point-scoring position in tenth.

=== Post-race ===
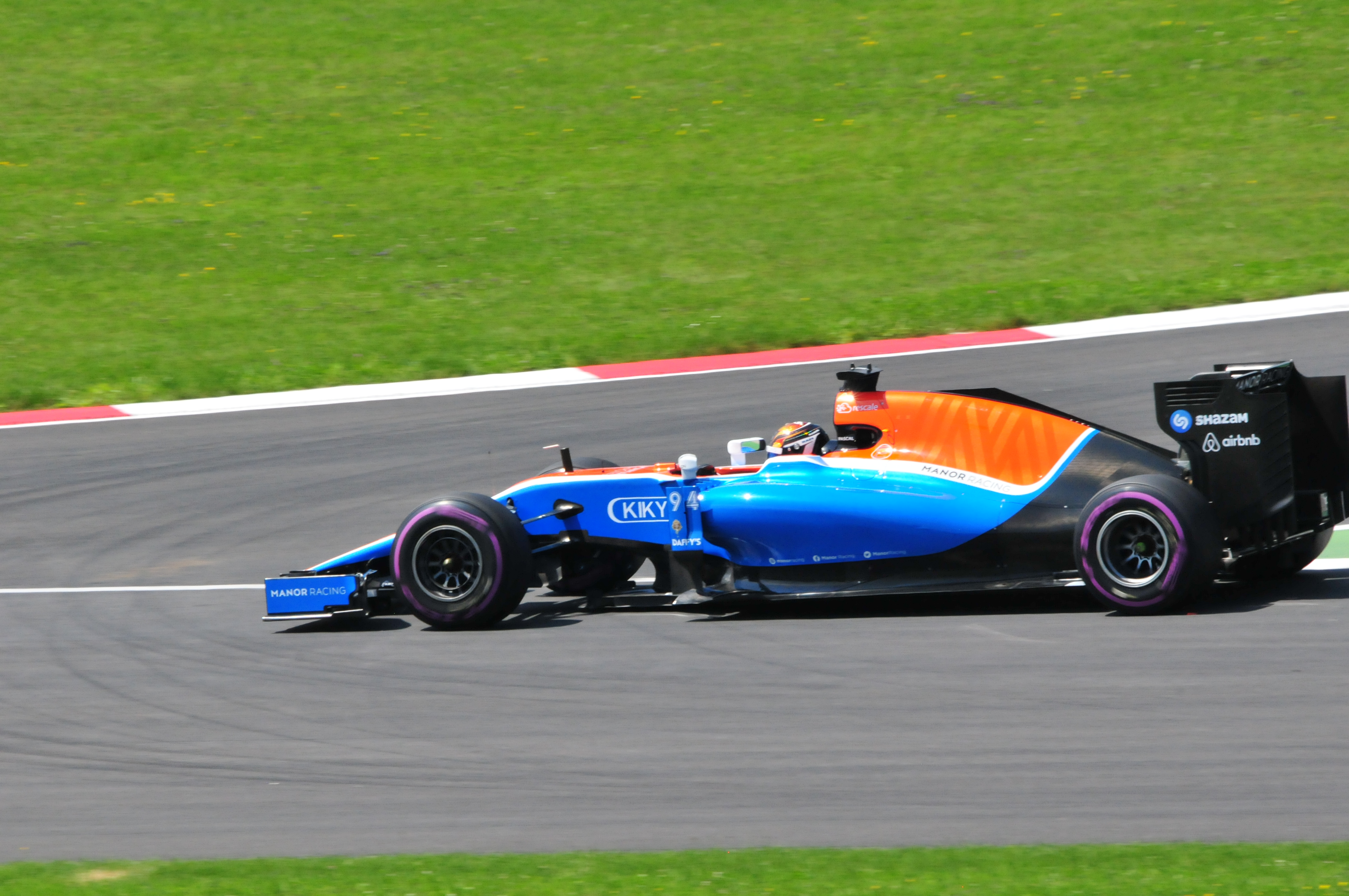
Pascal Wehrlein recorded his first ever point in Formula One.

At the podium ceremony following the race, Hamilton was booed by the crowd. In the podium interview, conducted by Spanish TV presenter Noemí de Miguel, he shrugged off the reaction, saying: "That's not my problem, it's theirs." Both Hamilton and Verstappen expressed delight at their result, while Räikkönen said that it had not been an easy day for the team, stressing that Ferrari had not achieved what they could have, since he felt that he could have overtaken Verstappen towards the end. Hamilton's win was the 250th victory by a British driver in Formula One and his first at the Spielberg circuit.

The crash between the two Mercedes drivers on the last lap was a talking point after the race. Three-time world champion Niki Lauda criticized Rosberg's move on Hamilton. Describing the incident as "brainless", their director of motorsport, Toto Wolff, declared that he was "fed up" with trying to analyse contacts between his drivers, emphasising that such incidents needed to stop. It had been the second time in five races that the pair had crashed into each other, with the first accident coming at the Spanish Grand Prix, as well as minor contact at the Canadian Grand Prix. Wolff said that should a similar situation arise in the future, the team would contemplate settling the order of the cars by telling them not to race each other, though he admitted that such a decision would be "unpopular". He made his feelings about possible team orders clear by saying: "[The thought] makes we want to puke myself but if racing is not possible without contact that is a consequence." One day after the race, it was reported that the team even contemplated using measures as far as fines and temporary suspensions for their drivers if another accident between the two should occur. Concerning Sebastian Vettel's tyre failure, supplier Pirelli announced that the blowup was not caused by a wrong strategy from Ferrari, but rather by debris on track.

For his incident with Hamilton, Rosberg was given a 10-second time penalty but as he was ahead of Ricciardo by 14 seconds this did not affect his finishing result. He was also reprimanded and given two penalty points for completing the race with a damaged car; the FIA concluded that this broke article 12.1.1h of the FIA International Sporting Code which states "Any unsafe act or failure to take reasonable measures, thus resulting in an unsafe situation." as a breach of the code.

As a result of the race, Nico Rosberg retained his lead in the Drivers' Championship, although Hamilton closed the gap to eleven points. The two Ferrari drivers of Vettel and Räikkönen followed in third and fourth, both on 96 points, followed by Ricciardo in fifth with 88. In the constructors' standings, Mercedes increased their lead over Ferrari now on 295 to 192 points. Red Bull were third, with 168 points, 76 points ahead of Williams.

== Classification ==
=== Qualifying ===
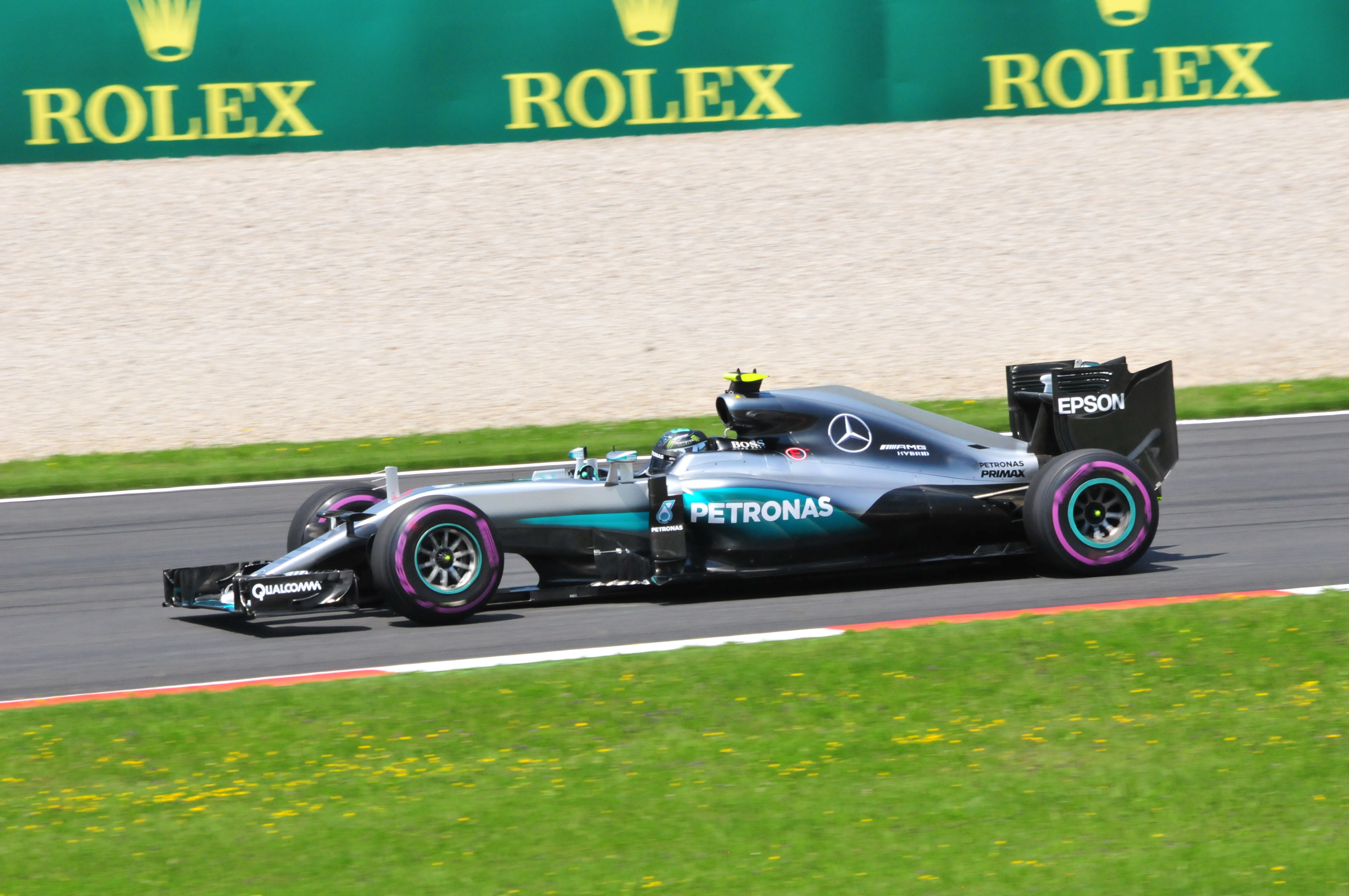
A grid penalty left Nico Rosberg in sixth place after qualifying.

Pos.	Car no.	Driver	Constructor	Qualifying times			Final grid
Pos.	Car no.	Driver	Constructor	Q1	Q2	Q3	Final grid
1	44	(United Kingdom) Lewis Hamilton	Mercedes	1:06.947	1:06.228	1:07.922	1
2	6	(Germany) Nico Rosberg	Mercedes	1:06.516	1:06.403	1:08.465	6^{1}
3	27	(Germany) Nico Hülkenberg	Force India-Mercedes	1:07.385	1:07.257	1:09.285	2
4	5	(Germany) Sebastian Vettel	Ferrari	1:06.761	1:06.602	1:09.781	9^{1}
5	22	(United Kingdom) Jenson Button	McLaren-Honda	1:07.653	1:07.572	1:09.900	3
6	7	(Finland) Kimi Räikkönen	Ferrari	1:07.240	1:06.940	1:09.901	4
7	3	(Australia) Daniel Ricciardo	Red Bull Racing-TAG Heuer	1:07.500	1:06.840	1:09.980	5
8	77	(Finland) Valtteri Bottas	Williams-Mercedes	1:07.148	1:06.911	1:10.440	7
9	33	(Netherlands) Max Verstappen	Red Bull Racing-TAG Heuer	1:07.131	1:06.866	1:11.153	8
10	19	(Brazil) Felipe Massa	Williams-Mercedes	1:07.419	1:07.145	1:11.977	PL^{2}
11	21	(Mexico) Esteban Gutiérrez	Haas-Ferrari	1:07.660	1:07.578		11
12	94	(Germany) Pascal Wehrlein	MRT-Mercedes	1:07.565	1:07.700		12
13	8	(France) Romain Grosjean	Haas-Ferrari	1:07.662	1:07.850		13
14	14	(Spain) Fernando Alonso	McLaren-Honda	1:07.671	1:08.154		14
15	55	(Spain) Carlos Sainz Jr.	Toro Rosso-Ferrari	1:07.618	No time^{4}		15
16	11	(Mexico) Sergio Pérez	Force India-Mercedes	1:07.657	No time^{4}		16
17	20	(Denmark) Kevin Magnussen	Renault	1:07.941			17
18	30	(United Kingdom) Jolyon Palmer	Renault	1:07.965			19^{5}
19	88	(Indonesia) Rio Haryanto	MRT-Mercedes	1:08.026			20^{5}
20	26	(Russia) Daniil Kvyat	Toro Rosso-Ferrari	1:08.409			PL^{3}
21	9	(Sweden) Marcus Ericsson	Sauber-Ferrari	1:08.418			18
22	12	(Brazil) Felipe Nasr	Sauber-Ferrari	1:08.446			21^{5}
107% time: 1:11.172

Notes

- ^1 – Nico Rosberg and Sebastian Vettel received five-place grid penalties for unscheduled gearbox changes.
- ^2 – After changing his front wing, Felipe Massa started from the pit lane.
- ^3 – Daniil Kvyat was required to start from the pit lane after getting a new survival cell (that came along with a new chassis).
- ^4 – Carlos Sainz Jr. and Sergio Pérez failed to set a lap time during Q2. As Sainz attempted to set a time while Pérez did not, he was considered to have qualified ahead of Pérez.
- ^5 – Jolyon Palmer, Rio Haryanto and Felipe Nasr received three-place grid penalties for failing to slow under yellow flags in Q1.

=== Race ===
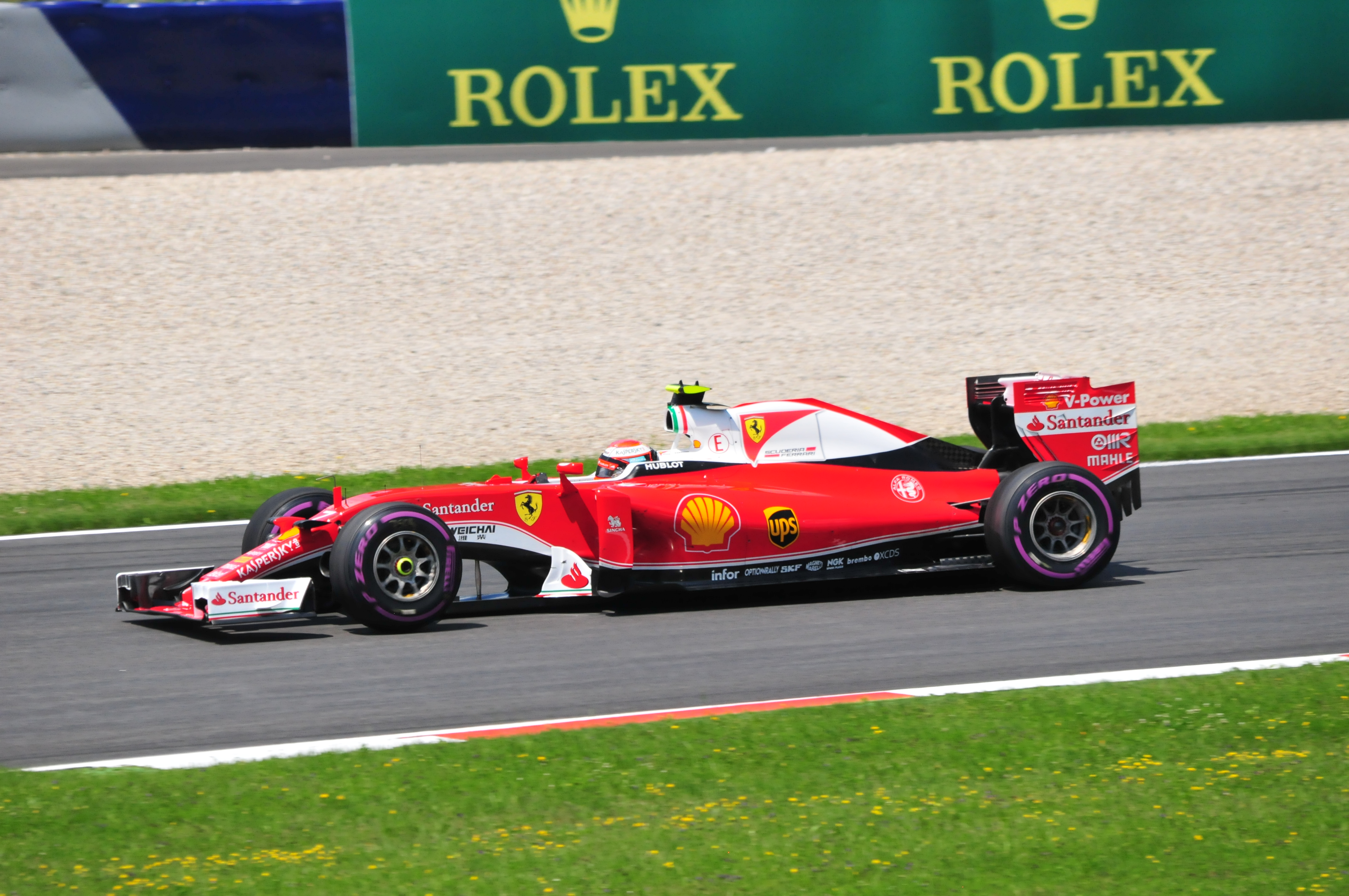
Kimi Räikkönen finished on the podium for Ferrari, in third place.

Pos.	No.	Driver	Constructor	Laps	Time/Retired	Grid	Points
1	44	(United Kingdom) Lewis Hamilton	Mercedes	71	1:27:38.107	1	25
2	33	(Netherlands) Max Verstappen	Red Bull Racing-TAG Heuer	71	+5.719	8	18
3	7	(Finland) Kimi Räikkönen	Ferrari	71	+6.024	4	15
4	6	(Germany) Nico Rosberg	Mercedes	71	+26.710^{1}	6	12
5	3	(Australia) Daniel Ricciardo	Red Bull Racing-TAG Heuer	71	+30.981	5	10
6	22	(United Kingdom) Jenson Button	McLaren-Honda	71	+37.706	3	8
7	8	(France) Romain Grosjean	Haas-Ferrari	71	+44.668^{2}	13	6
8	55	(Spain) Carlos Sainz Jr.	Toro Rosso-Ferrari	71	+47.400	15	4
9	77	(Finland) Valtteri Bottas	Williams-Mercedes	70	+1 lap	7	2
10	94	(Germany) Pascal Wehrlein	MRT-Mercedes	70	+1 lap	12	1
11	21	(Mexico) Esteban Gutiérrez	Haas-Ferrari	70	+1 lap	11	
12	30	(United Kingdom) Jolyon Palmer	Renault	70	+1 lap	19	
13	12	(Brazil) Felipe Nasr	Sauber-Ferrari	70	+1 lap	21	
14	20	(Denmark) Kevin Magnussen	Renault	70	+1 lap	17	
15	9	(Sweden) Marcus Ericsson	Sauber-Ferrari	70	+1 lap	18	
16	88	(Indonesia) Rio Haryanto	MRT-Mercedes	70	+1 lap	20	
17^{3}	11	(Mexico) Sergio Pérez	Force India-Mercedes	69	Accident	16	
18^{3}	14	(Spain) Fernando Alonso	McLaren-Honda	64	Battery	14	
19^{3}	27	(Germany) Nico Hülkenberg	Force India-Mercedes	64	Brakes	2	
20^{3}	19	(Brazil) Felipe Massa	Williams-Mercedes	63	Brakes	PL	
Ret	5	(Germany) Sebastian Vettel	Ferrari	26	Puncture/Accident	9	
Ret	26	(Russia) Daniil Kvyat	Toro Rosso-Ferrari	2	Hose Clamp	PL	

Notes

- ^1 – Nico Rosberg had ten seconds added to his race time for causing a collision with Lewis Hamilton.
- ^2 – Romain Grosjean had five seconds added to his race time for speeding in the pit-lane.
- ^3 – Sergio Pérez, Fernando Alonso, Nico Hülkenberg and Felipe Massa were classified as they had completed 90% of the race distance.

== Championship standings after the race ==
Drivers' Championship standings

Pos.	Driver	Points
1	(Germany) Nico Rosberg	153
2	(United Kingdom) Lewis Hamilton	142
3	(Germany) Sebastian Vettel	96
4	(Finland) Kimi Räikkönen	96
5	(Australia) Daniel Ricciardo	88

Constructors' Championship standings

Pos.	Constructor	Points
1	(Germany) Mercedes	295
2	(Italy) Ferrari	192
3	(Austria) Red Bull Racing-TAG Heuer	168
4	(United Kingdom) Williams-Mercedes	92
5	Force India-Mercedes	59

- Note: Only the top five positions are included for both sets of standings.

== See also ==
- 2016 Red Bull Ring GP2 Series round
- 2016 Red Bull Ring GP3 Series round

Previous race: 2016 European Grand Prix	FIA Formula One World Championship; 2016 season	Next race: 2016 British Grand Prix
Previous race: 2015 Austrian Grand Prix	Austrian Grand Prix	Next race: 2017 Austrian Grand Prix
