= 2016 British Grand Prix =

Race 10 of 21 in the 2016 Formula One World Championship
← Previous race	Next race →
- Layout of the Silverstone Circuit

Race details
- Date: 10 July 2016
- Official name: 2016 Formula 1 British Grand Prix
- Location: Silverstone Circuit; Silverstone, United Kingdom
- Course: Permanent racing facility
- Course length: 5.891 km (3.661 miles)
- Distance: 52 laps, 306.198 km (190.263 miles)
- Weather: Wet at start, dry later
- Attendance: 350,000 (weekend); 122,000 (race day)

Pole position
Driver	(United Kingdom) Lewis Hamilton	Mercedes
- Time: 1:29.287

Fastest lap
Driver	(Germany) Nico Rosberg	Mercedes
- Time: 1:35.548 on lap 44

Podium
First	(United Kingdom) Lewis Hamilton	Mercedes
Second	(Netherlands) Max Verstappen	Red Bull Racing-TAG Heuer
Third	(Germany) Nico Rosberg	Mercedes

The 2016 British Grand Prix (formally known as the 2016 Formula 1 British Grand Prix) was a Formula One motor race that was held on 10 July 2016 at the Silverstone Circuit in Silverstone, United Kingdom. This race was the seventy-first running of the British Grand Prix, the first having been held in 1926, and was the tenth round of the 2016 FIA Formula One World Championship and the fiftieth time that the race was held at the Silverstone Circuit since the Formula One series inception in 1950.

Mercedes driver Nico Rosberg entered the round with an eleven-point lead over teammate Lewis Hamilton in the Drivers' Championship. Mercedes held a 103-points advantage over Ferrari in the Constructors' Championship. During Saturday's qualifying session, Hamilton achieved the 55th pole position of his career to start from the front of the grid, ahead of Rosberg and Max Verstappen.

The race began behind the safety car due to rain shortly before the start. Hamilton was able to convert his pole position into a third straight victory at the British Grand Prix, leading home Rosberg and Verstappen in changing conditions. Rosberg came under investigation by the race stewards after he received detailed instructions by his team how to work around a gearbox problem in the closing laps of the race, a practice forbidden under Formula One regulations. He was later handed a ten-second time penalty, demoting him to third place. The result saw Rosberg's championship lead reduced to just a single point over Hamilton.

== Report ==
=== Background ===
Going into the weekend, Nico Rosberg was leading the Drivers' Championship with 153 points, eleven ahead of his teammate Lewis Hamilton. Ferrari drivers Sebastian Vettel and Kimi Räikkönen were third and fourth respectively, with 96 points each, ahead of Red Bull's Daniel Ricciardo with 88.In the Constructors' Championship standings, Mercedes was in front with 295 points, 103 ahead of Ferrari, with Red Bull Racing following in third with 168 points.

Following the collision between Lewis Hamilton and Nico Rosberg on the last lap of the Austrian Grand Prix, the second major collision between the two in five races, Mercedes introduced a new driver management policy, dictating the terms by which Hamilton and Rosberg could race one another and promising penalties in the event of further on-track altercations.

Tyre supplier Pirelli provided teams with the hard, medium and soft compounds of tyre—the three hardest compounds available—for the race. Just as the year before, the race stewards warned drivers about exceeding the track limits around the circuit, stressing that lap times during qualifying would be disallowed should drivers not stay within the lines indicating the track borders.

The second mid-season test of the year was scheduled to be held at the circuit following the race. Santino Ferrucci and Nikita Mazepin made their first appearances for Haas and Force India respectively, while Pierre Gasly drove for Red Bull Racing and Charles Leclerc for Ferrari. After missing the first test in Spain, Sauber once again skipped the post-race test. The reason behind this decision was stated as to "consider cost effectiveness", as the team did not have any new components to introduce. Sauber did however introduce their first updates of the season to their car during free practice at the event, with Marcus Ericsson doing a trial run with a new rear wing. Further aerodynamic updates that the team had announced the week before did not arrive in time for Silverstone. Sauber did however receive the benefit of Ferrari's updated version of their power unit, used by the works team since the Canadian Grand Prix. Haas was able to use the upgraded units as well. McLaren used an updated version of their Honda power unit as well, with two tokens – changes allowed to the units – applied to the combustion engine.

=== Free practice ===
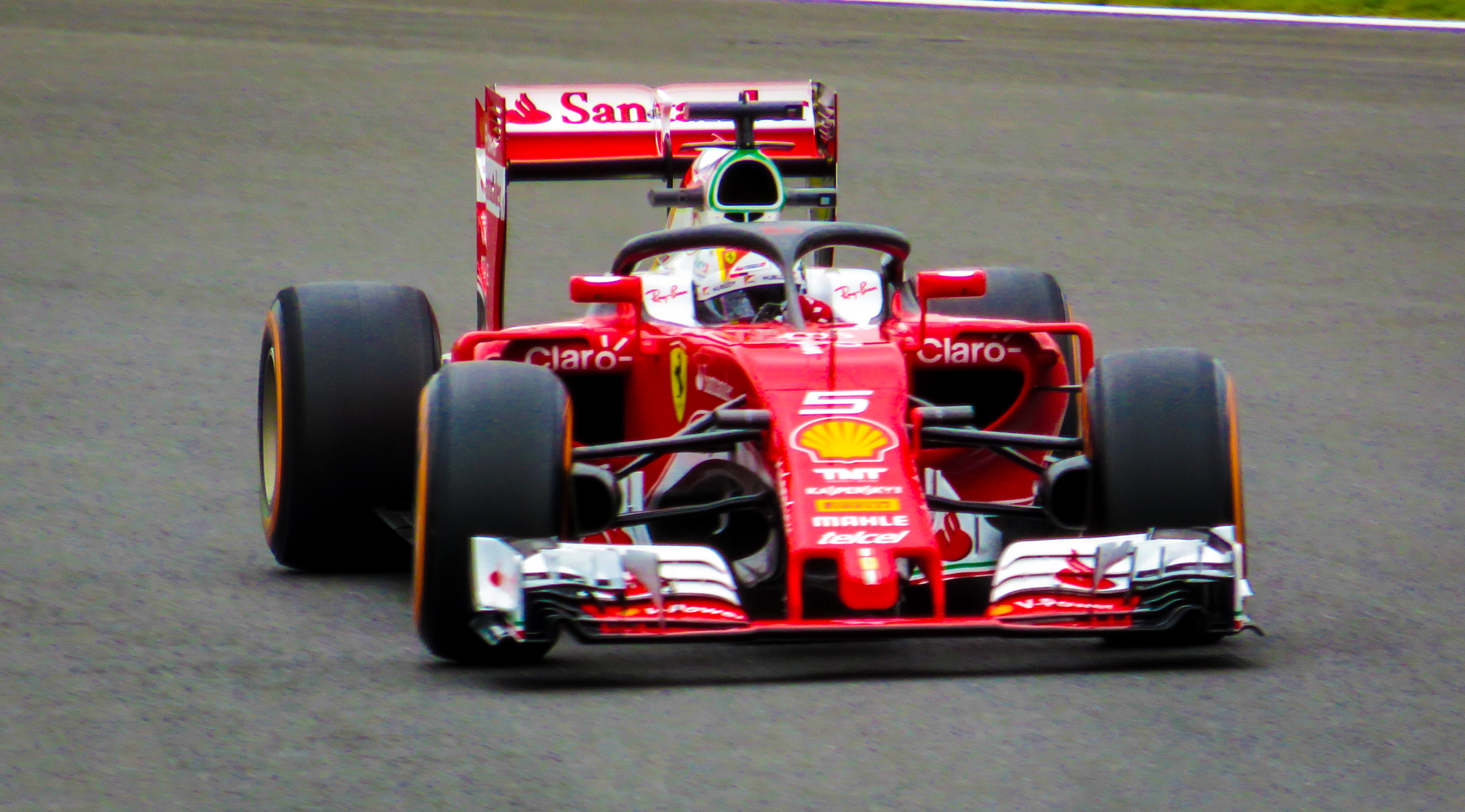
Sebastian Vettel tested the "halo" safety device in first practice.

Per the regulations for the 2016 season, two 90-minute practice sessions were held on Friday and another 60-minute session was held before qualifying on Saturday. Lewis Hamilton was fastest in the first practice session on Friday morning, setting a time of 1:31.654, less than a tenth of a second ahead of teammate Nico Rosberg. After setting their fast times, the Mercedes drivers went on to complete long stints to test race performance on the harder tyre compounds. Nico Hülkenberg and Sebastian Vettel in third and fourth were the only drivers to set a time within one second of the Mercedes. Charles Leclerc had his first practice outing with Haas, taking over the car usually run by Esteban Gutiérrez. He was a tenth of a second faster than the other test driver, Esteban Ocon, who took over Kevin Magnussen's Renault R.S.16. Vettel did a test with an updated version of Ferrari's "halo"-system designed to improve the protection of the driver's head inside the cockpit. He described the device as "not great", lamenting that it had "quite a bit of impact on visibility".

Hamilton was again fastest in the second practice on Friday afternoon, while Rosberg was unable to partake due to a water leak on his car. Hamilton's time of 1:31.660 was over three-tenths of a second faster than that of second places Daniel Ricciardo. Fellow Red Bull driver Max Verstappen was third, ahead of Vettel, all within one second of the fastest time. Ferrari split their practice strategy, with Kimi Räikkönen running the hard-compound tyre early in the session, while Vettel used the softer medium compound, before both switched to the soft tyres. At their home race, McLaren had a mixed session. While Fernando Alonso placed a good sixth, teammate Jenson Button had to take to the garage for repairs twice, before coming out on track again late in the session, eventually setting the ninth fastest time. Daniil Kvyat was 13th fastest, but damaged his front wing when he went over a kerb at Club corner.

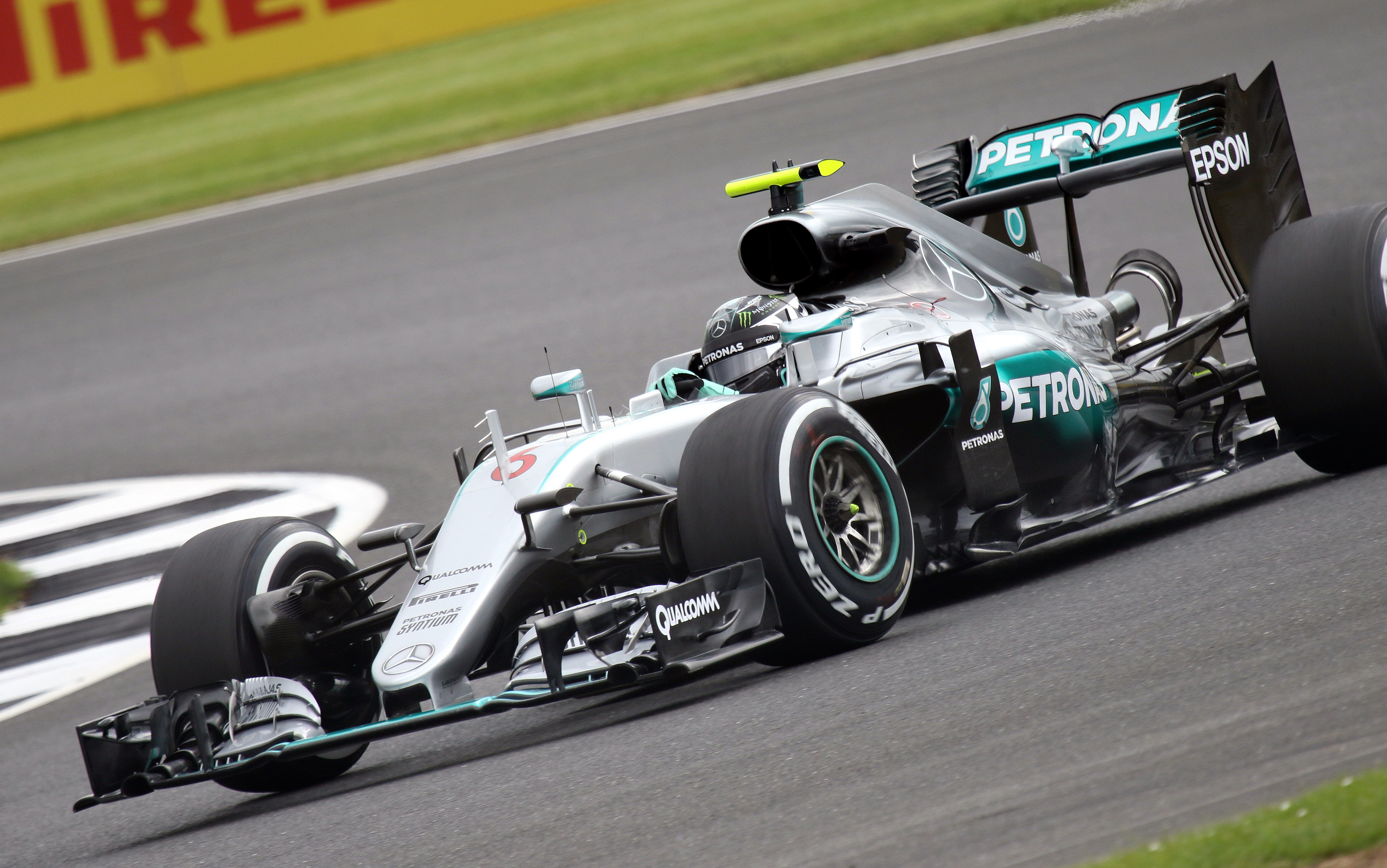
Nico Rosberg during free practice

Lewis Hamilton made it a clean sweep of fastest times in practice on Saturday morning, setting a time of 1:30.904, again less than a tenth of a second ahead of Rosberg. The session started in wet conditions following a rain shower thirty minutes before it commenced. It was interrupted with 22 minutes to go, after Marcus Ericsson crashed heavily at the exit of Stowe corner. With the car cleared from the track, lengthy repair work at the barriers followed, leaving just five minutes of running when practice was restarted. The drivers then set their fastest times of the session. Again, it were the Red Bull drivers closest to the Mercedes, with Ricciardo ahead of Verstappen in third, both about half a second off Hamilton's time. Ericsson was sent to hospital for tests following his accident and received a five-place grid penalty since his gearbox had to be changed. Vettel received the same penalty after his gearbox failed towards the end of the third practice session.

=== Qualifying ===
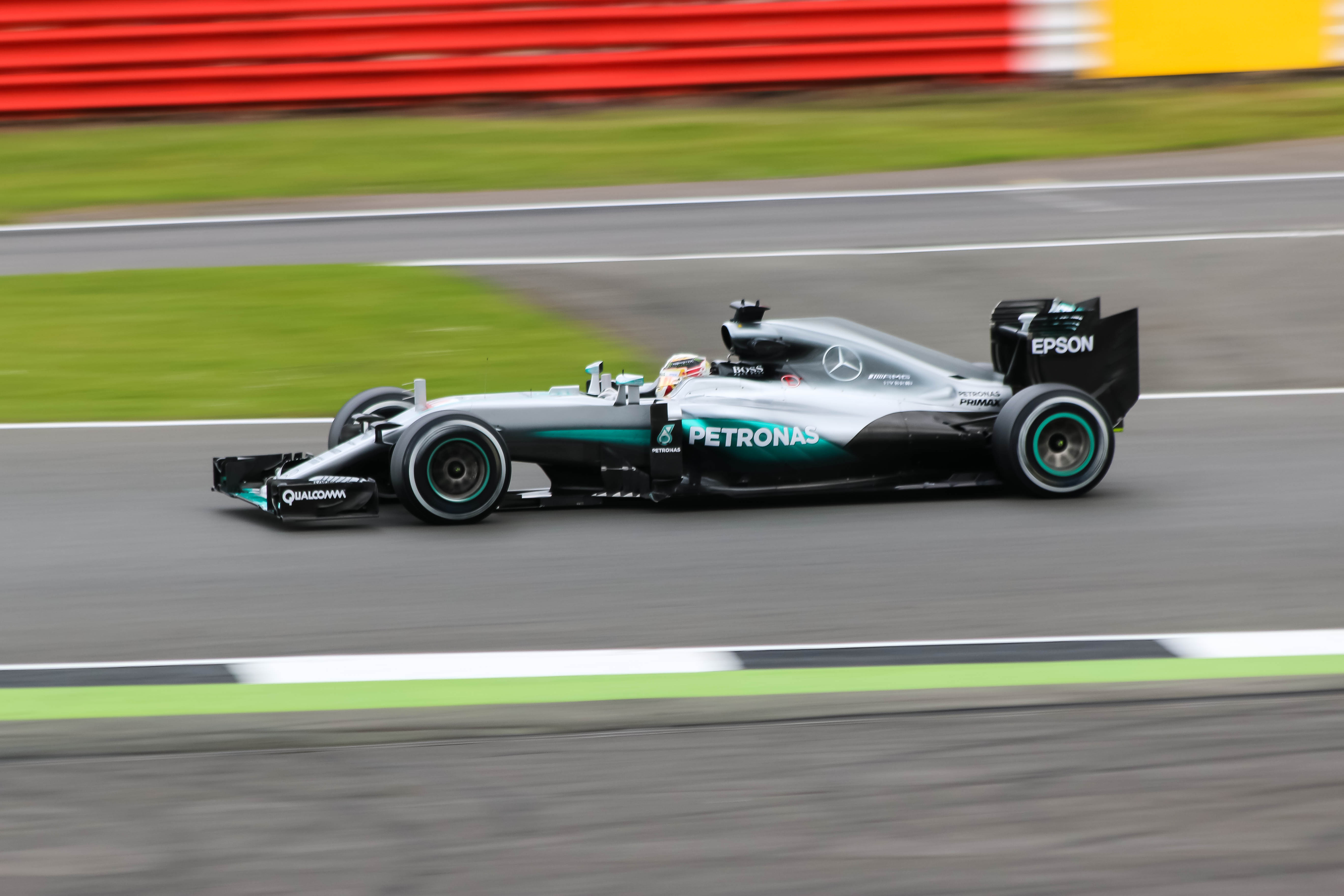
Lewis Hamilton started from pole position after posting the fastest time in qualifying.

Qualifying consisted of three parts, 18, 15 and 12 minutes in length respectively, with six drivers eliminated from competing after each of the first two sessions. Following his crash, Ericsson did not take part in qualifying and was therefore automatically eliminated, leaving five drivers in danger of not going through into the second session. In the first part of qualifying (Q1), several drivers were investigated for exceeding track limits emerged. Jenson Button ended the session 17th due to a damaged rear wing, a disappointment after having started third a week before in Austria. Also eliminated were the other Sauber driver Felipe Nasr, both Manor cars and Jolyon Palmer.

Lewis Hamilton set the pace in Q2, seven-tenths of a second ahead of Rosberg. Kimi Räikkönen was in danger of being eliminated for the majority of the session, as he spun while preparing for his first timed lap and then ran wide over the track limits on his second attempt, but managed to proceed into Q3 with his third fast lap. He initially demoted Fernando Alonso outside the top ten with his time, but the McLaren driver hit back with a time sufficient to move on. This left Magnussen, Daniil Kvyat, Gutiérrez, Romain Grosjean, Felipe Massa, and Sergio Pérez on the sidelines for Q3.

On his first timed run in Q3, Hamilton failed to improve on his lap time from Q2, but was still well ahead of his teammate. However, his time was disallowed for not respecting track limits, meaning that he had to set another fast lap. Even though he slowed down in the middle sector of the lap to avoid making the same mistake again, he recorded a time just short of his earlier effort to achieve the 55th pole position of his career. Verstappen slotted into third on the grid, almost a second down on Hamilton, with his teammate Ricciardo next to him in fourth. The Red Bull pair was followed by the Ferrari cars of Räikkönen and Vettel, though Vettel's grid penalty meant that he would start 11th. Carlos Sainz Jr. was eighth on the grid ahead of Hülkenberg and Alonso. Both had originally set times faster than Sainz's, but those were disallowed due to them exceeding the track limits. Following qualifying, the paddock was split in its opinion over the strict interpretation of the track limit rules. Hamilton and Hülkenberg, who both fell victim to erased lap times, supported the stewards' decision, as did Jenson Button. However, Jolyon Palmer was angered by what he called "a mess" and "rubbish for the fans", saying that having times changed after the end of the session, as it happened in Hülkenberg's case, was "confusing for fans and less enjoyable".

=== Race ===
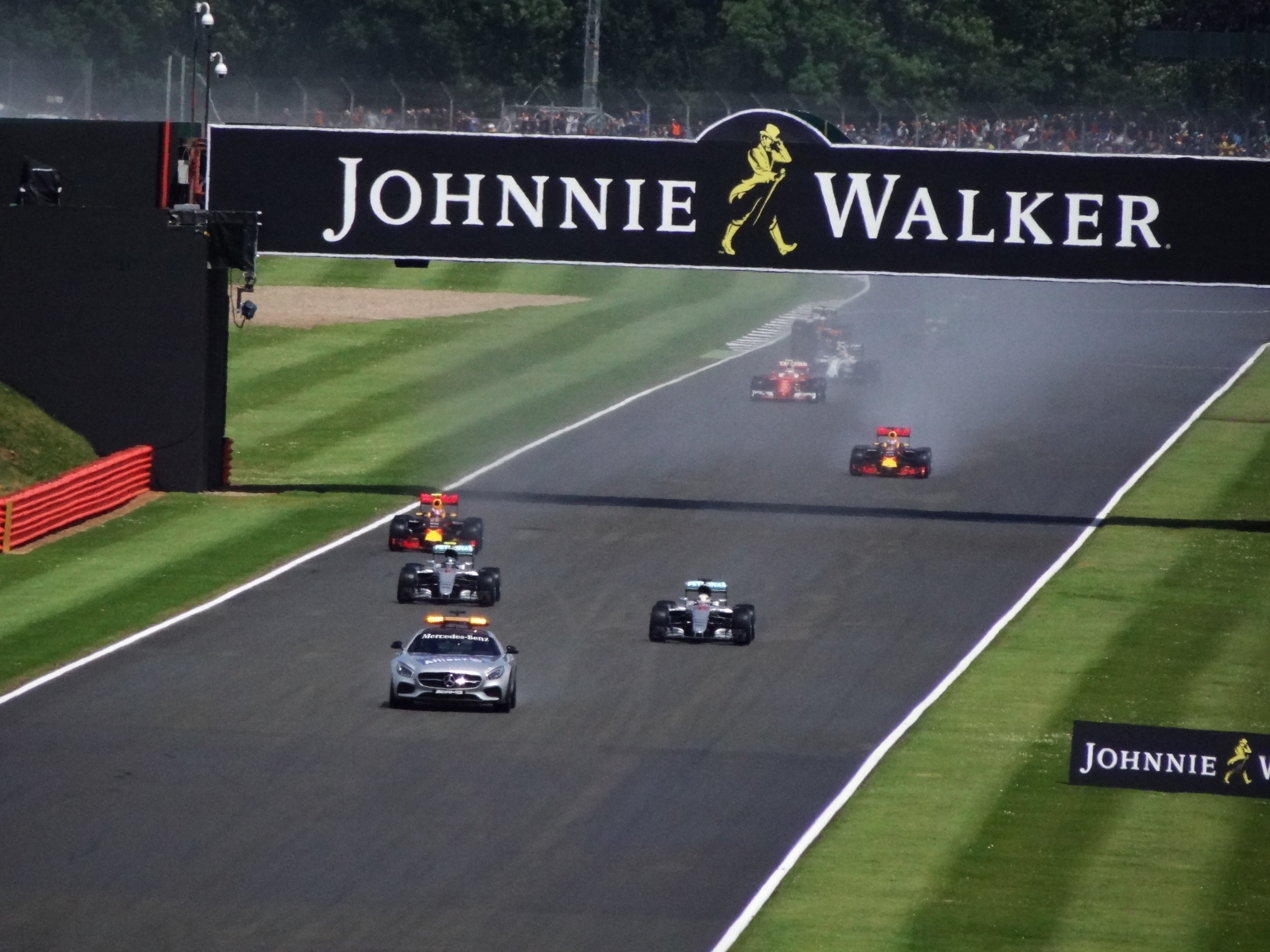
Due to rain shortly before the start, the race commenced behind the safety car.

Due to rain shortly before the start of the race, it commenced behind the safety car, with every car equipped with full wet tyres. The safety car came back into the pitlane at the end of lap five and racing began properly. While the top four drivers stayed out, several behind chose to make a pitstop for intermediate tyres. Just one lap later, Pascal Wehrlein became the first casualty of the still damp track, sliding off the track and getting stuck in the gravel, leading to a brief virtual safety car period. During this time, both Hamilton and Rosberg changed tyres. The biggest winner of the first few laps was Sergio Pérez, who had worked up his way from tenth on the grid to fourth, ahead of Ricciardo. Meanwhile, at the front, Hamilton had established a five-second advantage over Rosberg, who soon came under attack by Verstappen, who was running well on the intermediate tyres. Bottas came into a spin on lap 11, losing positions and dropping back to 13th place. On lap 16, Sebastian Vettel was the first driver to make the switch to slick tyres, while Verstappen moved ahead of Rosberg into second position.

Lap 18 saw more drivers making the change to slick tyres, including Räikkönen and Palmer, but the latter was let go from his pitbox before one of the tyres was properly fitted, costing him time and handing him a ten-second stop-and-go penalty. Both Mercedes drivers and Verstappen made their second pitstops by lap 20, with the order remaining the same. On lap 21, Ricciardo moved ahead of Pérez into fourth position. A mistake by Räikkönen two laps later saw him lose sixth place to Sainz. Fernando Alonso spun on lap 25, but was able to continue, unlike Rio Haryanto, who retired following a spin one lap later. Hamilton retained the lead, but not without problems, as he also had a short excursion off the track, which was mirrored by Verstappen behind him. As a result, the top three moved closer together. Vettel was still running at the back end of the point-scoring positions, overtaking Kvyat for ninth on lap 29.

Nico Rosberg started to close on Verstappen for second place, starting overtaking attempts on lap 33 and finally succeeding on lap 38. Meanwhile, Vettel was judged to have forced Felipe Massa off the track when he overtook him for eighth place, handing him a five-second time penalty. On lap 40, Jolyon Palmer retired in the pitlane. While Rosberg initially closed in on Hamilton, the latter started to improve his lap times towards the end of the race. As Räikkönen got back into fifth at the expense of Pérez, Rosberg reported problems with his gearbox on the team radio. His team told him to avoid using seventh gear, following which Rosberg was able to consolidate his slim lead over Verstappen, which had initially come down due to his problem. Hamilton was unaffected by this and crossed the line to take victory, 6.9 seconds ahead of Rosberg. He was the first driver to win the British Grand Prix three times in a row and also became the record winner at the Silverstone circuit, with four victories. It was the 47th victory of his career.

=== Post-race ===
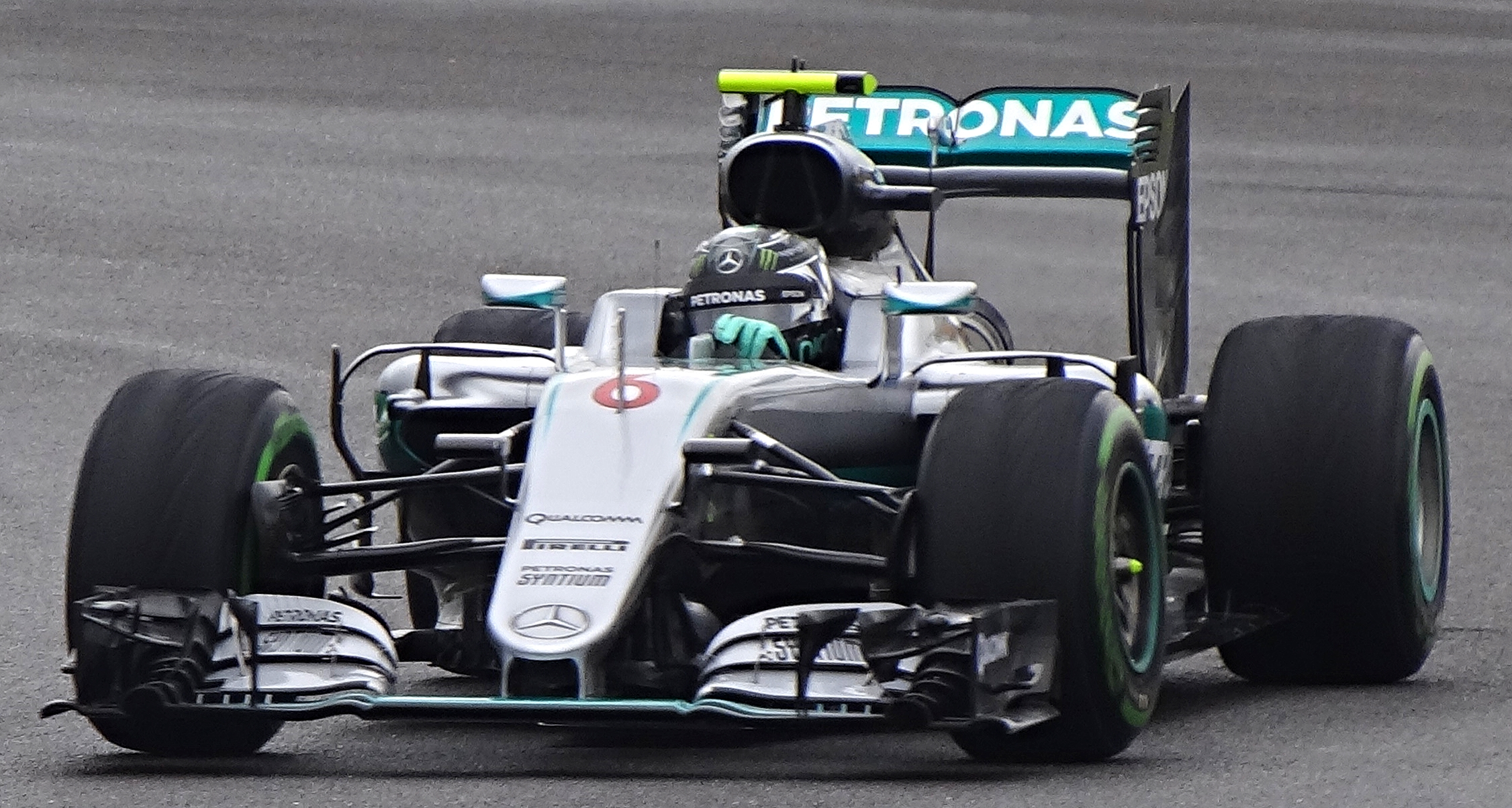
Nico Rosberg finished third for Mercedes after receiving a ten-second time penalty for illegal radio instructions from his team.

On the podium, Nico Rosberg was booed by the home crowd, mirroring a similar incident towards Hamilton at the previous race in Austria. Hamilton later told the press that he encouraged his fans not to act in such a way towards his teammate, saying: "I honestly think us as Brits, the British fans, I think we're better than that." During the interviews at the podium ceremony, conducted by former Formula One driver Mark Webber, Hamilton had expressed his delight at the fact that the weather had made the race more difficult. Rosberg spoke of "an exciting race" against Verstappen and highlighted his "very critical problem" with his gearbox, but stressed that he felt confident that the instructions he received from his team to fix it were within the rules. However, the stewards – led by former driver Nigel Mansell – did not share his view and applied a ten-second time penalty for what they felt were instructions not compliant with the sporting regulations, demoting Rosberg to third place. The rules on instructions from the team to the driver had been tightened before the first race of the season, specifying that "the driver shall drive the car alone and unaided".

Ferrari team was unhappy with its performance over the weekend, with Vettel summing up: "Overall it was not our day, not quick enough simple as that." He also expressed his irritation at receiving a five-second time penalty and two penalty points on his FIA Super Licence for an overtaking manoeuvre on Massa. Kimi Räikkönen on the other had declared that Ferrari's poor showing would prove to be a one-time incident, saying: "I'm sure in the next races will be much more normal for us."

As a result of the race, Rosberg's lead in the Drivers' Championship over Hamilton was reduced to a single point (168 to 167 points), with Räikkönen following in third with 106 points. Sebastian Vettel fell back to fifth with 98 points, two points behind Daniel Ricciardo. In the Constructors' standings, Mercedes extended its lead over Ferrari to 131 points, while Red Bull closed in on Ferrari and was only six points behind.

== Classification ==
=== Qualifying ===
Pos.	Car no.	Driver	Constructor	Qualifying times			Final grid
Pos.	Car no.	Driver	Constructor	Q1	Q2	Q3	Final grid
1	44	(United Kingdom) Lewis Hamilton	Mercedes	1:30.739	1:29.243	1:29.287	1
2	6	(Germany) Nico Rosberg	Mercedes	1:30.724	1:29.970	1:29.606	2
3	33	(Netherlands) Max Verstappen	Red Bull Racing-TAG Heuer	1:31.305	1:30.697	1:30.313	3
4	3	(Australia) Daniel Ricciardo	Red Bull Racing-TAG Heuer	1:31.684	1:31.319	1:30.618	4
5	7	(Finland) Kimi Räikkönen	Ferrari	1:31.326	1:31.385	1:30.881	5
6	5	(Germany) Sebastian Vettel	Ferrari	1:31.606	1:30.711	1:31.490	11^{1}
7	77	(Finland) Valtteri Bottas	Williams-Mercedes	1:31.913	1:31.478	1:31.557	6
8	55	(Spain) Carlos Sainz Jr.	Toro Rosso-Ferrari	1:32.115	1:31.708	1:31.989	7
9	27	(Germany) Nico Hülkenberg	Force India-Mercedes	1:32.349	1:31.770	1:32.172	8
10	14	(Spain) Fernando Alonso	McLaren-Honda	1:32.281	1:31.740	1:32.343	9
11	11	(Mexico) Sergio Pérez	Force India-Mercedes	1:32.336	1:31.875		10
12	19	(Brazil) Felipe Massa	Williams-Mercedes	1:32.146	1:32.002		12
13	8	(France) Romain Grosjean	Haas-Ferrari	1:32.283	1:32.050		13
14	21	(Mexico) Esteban Gutiérrez	Haas-Ferrari	1:32.237	1:32.241		14
15	26	(Russia) Daniil Kvyat	Toro Rosso-Ferrari	1:32.553	1:32.306		15
16	20	(Denmark) Kevin Magnussen	Renault	1:32.729	1:37.060		16
17	22	(United Kingdom) Jenson Button	McLaren-Honda	1:32.788			17
18	30	(United Kingdom) Jolyon Palmer	Renault	1:32.905			18
19	88	(Indonesia) Rio Haryanto	MRT-Mercedes	1:33.098			19
20	94	(Germany) Pascal Wehrlein	MRT-Mercedes	1:33.151			20
21	12	(Brazil) Felipe Nasr	Sauber-Ferrari	1:33.544			21
107% time: 1:37.074
—	9	(Sweden) Marcus Ericsson	Sauber-Ferrari	No time			PL^{2}

Notes

- ^1 – Sebastian Vettel received a five-place grid penalty for an unscheduled gearbox change.
- ^2 – Marcus Ericsson did not take part in qualifying following a heavy crash during FP3. His participation in the race came at the discretion of the stewards, who allowed him to start the race. He was required to start from the pit lane after getting a new survival cell.

=== Race ===
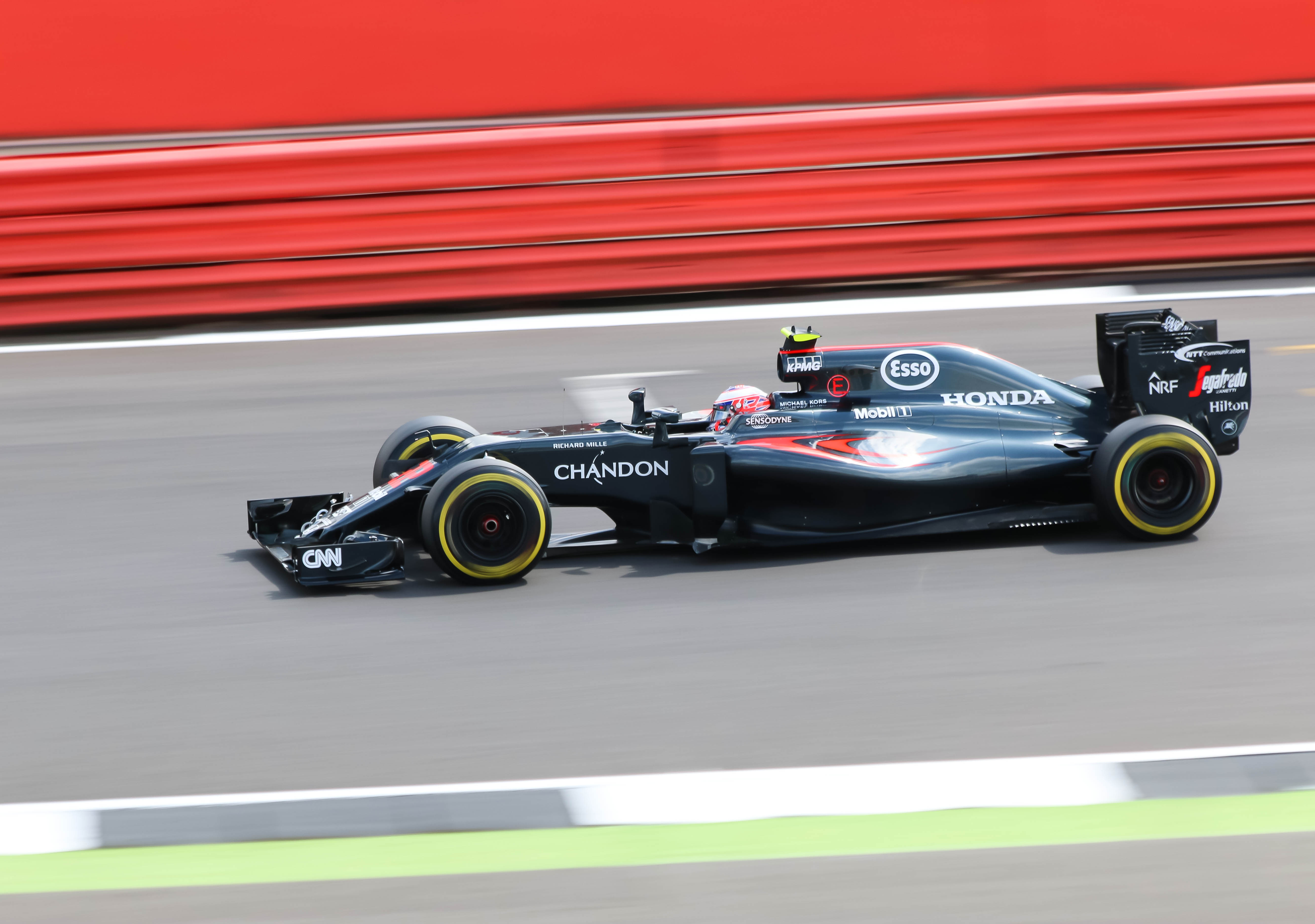
Jenson Button finished twelfth in his final home race.

Pos.	No.	Driver	Constructor	Laps	Time/Retired	Grid	Points
1	44	(United Kingdom) Lewis Hamilton	Mercedes	52	1:34:55.831	1	25
2	33	(Netherlands) Max Verstappen	Red Bull Racing-TAG Heuer	52	+8.250	3	18
3	6	(Germany) Nico Rosberg	Mercedes	52	+16.911^{1}	2	15
4	3	(Australia) Daniel Ricciardo	Red Bull Racing-TAG Heuer	52	+26.211	4	12
5	7	(Finland) Kimi Räikkönen	Ferrari	52	+1:09.743	5	10
6	11	(Mexico) Sergio Pérez	Force India-Mercedes	52	+1:16.941	10	8
7	27	(Germany) Nico Hülkenberg	Force India-Mercedes	52	+1:17.712	8	6
8	55	(Spain) Carlos Sainz Jr.	Toro Rosso-Ferrari	52	+1:25.858	7	4
9	5	(Germany) Sebastian Vettel	Ferrari	52	+1:31.654^{2}	11	2
10	26	(Russia) Daniil Kvyat	Toro Rosso-Ferrari	52	+1:32.600	15	1
11	19	(Brazil) Felipe Massa	Williams-Mercedes	51	+1 Lap	12	
12	22	(United Kingdom) Jenson Button	McLaren-Honda	51	+1 Lap	17	
13	14	(Spain) Fernando Alonso	McLaren-Honda	51	+1 Lap	9	
14	77	(Finland) Valtteri Bottas	Williams-Mercedes	51	+1 Lap	6	
15	12	(Brazil) Felipe Nasr	Sauber-Ferrari	51	+1 Lap	21	
16	21	(Mexico) Esteban Gutiérrez	Haas-Ferrari	51	+1 Lap	14	
17^{3}	20	(Denmark) Kevin Magnussen	Renault	49	Gearbox	16	
Ret	30	(United Kingdom) Jolyon Palmer	Renault	37	Gearbox	18	
Ret	88	(Indonesia) Rio Haryanto	MRT-Mercedes	24	Spun off	19	
Ret	8	(France) Romain Grosjean	Haas-Ferrari	17	Transmission	13	
Ret	9	(Sweden) Marcus Ericsson	Sauber-Ferrari	11	Power unit	PL	
Ret	94	(Germany) Pascal Wehrlein	MRT-Mercedes	6	Spun off	20	

Notes

- ^1 – Nico Rosberg originally finished second, but received a ten-second time penalty for receiving illegal assistance via team radio, demoting him to third.
- ^2 – Sebastian Vettel received a five-second penalty for forcing Felipe Massa off the track.
- ^3 – Kevin Magnussen retired from the race, but was classified as finishing as he had completed 90% of the race distance.

== Championship standings after the race ==
Drivers' Championship standings

	Pos.	Driver	Points
	1	(Germany) Nico Rosberg	168
	2	(United Kingdom) Lewis Hamilton	167
1	3	(Finland) Kimi Räikkönen	106
1	4	(Australia) Daniel Ricciardo	100
2	5	(Germany) Sebastian Vettel	98

Constructors' Championship standings

Pos.	Constructor	Points
1	(Germany) Mercedes	335
2	(Italy) Ferrari	204
3	(Austria) Red Bull Racing-TAG Heuer	198
4	(United Kingdom) Williams-Mercedes	92
5	Force India-Mercedes	73
Sources:

- Note: Only the top five positions are included for both sets of standings.

== See also ==
- 2016 Silverstone GP2 Series round
- 2016 Silverstone GP3 Series round

Previous race: 2016 Austrian Grand Prix	FIA Formula One World Championship; 2016 season	Next race: 2016 Hungarian Grand Prix
Previous race: 2015 British Grand Prix	British Grand Prix	Next race: 2017 British Grand Prix
