= Noemí de Miguel =

Spanish sports journalist and television presenter (born 1980)

- Born: 14 February 1980 (age 46); Autol, La Rioja, Spain
- Education: University of Bilbao
- Occupations: Sports journalist; Television presenter
- Employers: Radio Nacional de España (2002–2005); Canal+ (2005–2015); Movistar+ (2016–2021); DAZN 2021

Noemí de Miguel (born 14 February 1980) is a Spanish sports journalist and television presenter for Movistar+. She has covered major association football leagues and matches for Radio Nacional de España (RNE) and Canal+ before moving to Movistar+ to present its coverage of Formula One motor racing from 2016. De Miguel has also covered tennis on television, and has contributed to sports newspaper Diario AS.

== Biography ==
De Miguel was born on 14 February 1980, in Autol, a town in the province of La Rioja. She was raised at her grandparents house in Autol because her mother and father worked continuously, and watched a wide variety of sports on television with her grandparents during her childhood. De Miguel was asked whether she wanted to pursue a career as a medicine doctor to which she replied she wanted to become a sports journalist. This was after her father encouraged her to study instead to trying to aim for a career in professional basketball. She left Autol and moved to Bilbao to do a master's degree in journalism at the University of Bilbao, which she completed in 2002, and went on to complete a three-year internship at Radio Arnedo. De Miguel travelled to Madrid and passed the selection to become a sports reporter for Radio Nacional de España (RNE). This marked the beginning of her professional career and she started working for the broadcaster in 2002. Over the next three years, De Miguel contributed to the sports programmes Tablero deportivo and Radiogaceta de los deportes.

Her contract with RNE expired in late 2005 and she received a telephone call from television channel Canal+ who were seeking a female sports reporter. De Miguel accepted the job because she did not want to return to Autol to ask her parents for money and also worked for a Madrid-based newspaper. She began working for Canal+ in November 2005, covering association football. De Miguel was present at the 2006 FIFA World Cup in Germany, and covered various football tournaments such as the UEFA Champions League and La Liga, the 2010 FIFA World Cup in South Africa and UEFA Euro 2012. She also presented a daily tennis programme focused on the 2009 Wimbledon Championships, Canal+'s flagship late night sports programme El Día del Fútbol analysing La Liga matches alongside various football players from 2009 to 2015, and the programme El día después.

In late 2015, De Miguel considered changing jobs because she felt she was not progressing personally and professionally and wanted to be challenged. Broadcaster Movistar+ began seeking for a new presenter for its coverage of Formula One motor racing following its take over of the rights from Antena 3. She was confirmed as taking on the role as presenter in February 2016, replacing Antena 3's Lucía Villalón. De Miguel received some suspicion and criticism in online forums prior to the start of the 2016 season because of her background as an association football broadcaster. She found it not difficult to learn about Formula One jargon, and her first event was the 2016 Australian Grand Prix. In 2020, when Formula One was suspended by the Fédération Internationale de l'Automobile and the series' promoter Liberty Media due to the COVID-19 pandemic, she began a Movistar+ programme called Parque cerrado to remain in contact with individuals in the championship.

In her career, De Miguel has contributed to sports newspaper Diario AS, and in January 2020, she was made an ambassador of the University Soccer project to help male and female Spanish football players obtain scholarships to allow them to play in American university leagues and study at them. When DAZN became Spain's official Formula One broadcaster from 2021, she joined the platform on its dedicated Formula One channel. She replaced Iñaki Urrutia as the main presenter of El día después in September 2022, and combined this with her Formula One broadcasting commitments. In 2024, De Miguel published her first book, Jugonas, that compiles information on 35 women in football and international football refereeing.

== Personal life ==
She is against gender abuse and prefers to keep her private life out of the press. De Miguel spoke about equality and representation of women in the Spanish media to radio broadcaster Cadena SER for International Women's Day 2015. She says she prepares for each race by reading motorsport books and magazines as well as working with former drivers and mechanics to learn about their roles in the sport. To combat the stress of working in Formula One, she took up running to allow her to catch up with the sport and to allow her to adapt to different time zones.
