= Lucía Villalón =

Spanish sports journalist and television presenter (born 1988)

- Born: Lucía Villalón Puras; 22 August 1988 (age 38); Santander, Spain
- Occupations: Sports journalist; Television presenter
- Spouse: Gonzalo Melero (m. 2022)
- Children: 2
- Relatives: Jesús Puras (uncle)

Lucía Villalón Puras (born 22 August 1988) is a Spanish sports journalist and television presenter. A law and journalism graduate of the Universidad CEU San Pablo in Madrid, she began her career as an intern at Televisión Española before presenting for Real Madrid TV. Villalón was the pit lane reporter of Antena 3's coverage of Formula One motor racing in 2015. She has also covered sport for beIN Sports, Televisa Deportes, Univision, DAZN and presented her own programme on the Movistar Plus+ channel.

== Biography ==
Villalón was born in Santander, Spain on 22 August 1988. Her father is the businessman Curro Villalón, and she has a brother and a sister. Villalón's uncle Jesús Puras was a rally driver and her parents encouraged her and her siblings to do all sorts of outdoor activities. She is a law and journalism graduate of the Universidad CEU San Pablo in Madrid. Villalón had always wanted to become a journalist and liked law and believed it to complement nicely.

She began her career as an intern for Televisión Española, focusing on sport. Villalón went on to be a presenter for Real Madrid TV. In 2015, she became the pit lane reporter for Antena 3's free-to-air television coverage of the Formula One single-seater motor racing championship, replacing Nira Juanco. Villalón was required to study the series during the pre-season testing sessions at the Circuit de Barcelona-Catalunya at which she began working and her first race broadcast was at the 2015 Australian Grand Prix. She focused on the Spanish racing drivers Carlos Sainz Jr., Fernando Alonso and Roberto Merhi. In 2016, Villalón joined beIN Sports as a presenter of the La Liga football league and began working for the broadcaster that August. She also reported on the Copa América Centenario in 2016 and the Bundesliga.

Villalón reported on the 2018 FIFA World Cup in Russia for Televisa Deportes and Univision. She resigned from beIN Sports in August 2018 and moved to the Spanish-language American sports channel Univisión Deportes, reporting on events such as the UEFA Champions League. Villalón left the network in late 2019. The following year, Villalón joined the sports content streaming platform DAZN, covering the Premier League, the EuroLeague. In August 2023, she joined the Movistar Plus+ channel and presented the Deporte Plus+ con Lucía Villalón programme in place of Jesús Gallego. Villalón has been an ambassador of DS Automobiles, and the Swedish soft drinks company Vitamin Well.

== Personal life ==
Villalón was in a relationship with the football player from Javier Hernández April 2015 to January 2017. She entered into a relationship with the football player Gonzalo Melero in 2021, and they married in mid-2022. They have two children.
