= 2016 V8 Supercar season =

The 2016 V8 Supercar season was the twentieth and final season in which V8 Supercars have contested the premier Australian touring car series. It was the 57th season of touring car racing in Australia since the first runnings of the Australian Touring Car Championship, now known as the International V8 Supercars Championship, and the fore-runner of the present day Bathurst 1000, the Armstrong 500.

The season began on 3 March at the Adelaide Street Circuit and finished on 27 November at the Homebush Street Circuit. 2016 featured the twentieth V8 Supercar Championship, consisting of 29 races at 14 events covering all six states and the Northern Territory of Australia as well an event in New Zealand. Originally the Supercars were going to make their first trip to Kuala Lumpur, but the event had to be cancelled due to certain logistical failures on the part of the promoters in Malaysia. There was also a stand-alone event supporting the 2016 Australian Grand Prix. The season also featured the seventeenth second-tier Dunlop V8 Supercar Series, contested over seven rounds. For the ninth time, de-registered Supercars contested an unofficial third-tier series, the Kumho Tyre V8 Touring Car Series.

== Race calendar ==
The following events were held during the season.

| Event title | Circuit | City / state | Race/round | Date | Winner | Report |
|---|---|---|---|---|---|---|
| (South Australia) Clipsal 500 Adelaide | Adelaide Street Circuit | Adelaide, South Australia | IVC 1 IVC 2 IVC 3 | 3–6 March | Jamie Whincup; James Courtney; Nick Percat | Report |
| (South Australia) Clipsal 500 Adelaide | Adelaide Street Circuit | Adelaide, South Australia | DVS 1 | 3–6 March | Garry Jacobson | |
| (Victoria (state)) Coates Hire V8 Supercars Challenge | Albert Park Street Circuit | Melbourne, Victoria | IVC NC | 17–20 March | Shane van Gisbergen | Report |
| Tyrepower Tasmania SuperSprint | Symmons Plains Raceway | Launceston, Tasmania | IVC 4 IVC 5 | 1–3 April | Shane van Gisbergen; Will Davison | Report |
| (Victoria (state)) Sandown | Sandown Raceway | Melbourne, Victoria | KVTC 1 | 1–3 April | Taz Douglas | |
| (Victoria (state)) WD-40 Phillip Island SuperSprint | Phillip Island Grand Prix Circuit | Phillip Island, Victoria | IVC 6 IVC 7 | 15–17 April | Scott McLaughlin; Scott McLaughlin | Report |
| (Victoria (state)) WD-40 Phillip Island SuperSprint | Phillip Island Grand Prix Circuit | Phillip Island, Victoria | DVS 2 | 15–17 April | Garry Jacobson | |
| (Western Australia) Perth SuperSprint | Barbagallo Raceway | Perth, Western Australia | IVC 8 IVC 9 | 6–8 May | Craig Lowndes; Mark Winterbottom | Report |
| (Western Australia) Perth SuperSprint | Barbagallo Raceway | Perth, Western Australia | DVS 3 | 6–8 May | Jack Le Brocq | |
| (Victoria (state)) Woodstock Winton SuperSprint | Winton Motor Raceway | Benalla, Victoria | IVC 10; IVC 11 | 20–22 May | Tim Slade; Tim Slade | Report |
| (Victoria (state)) Woodstock Winton SuperSprint | Winton Motor Raceway | Benalla, Victoria | KVTC 2 | 20–22 May | Taz Douglas | |
| (Northern Territory) CrownBet Darwin Triple Crown | Hidden Valley Raceway | Darwin, Northern Territory | IVC 12; IVC 13 | 17–19 June | Michael Caruso; Shane van Gisbergen | Report |
| (Queensland) Castrol Edge Townsville 400 | Townsville Street Circuit | Townsville, Queensland | IVC 14; IVC 15 | 8–10 July | Jamie Whincup; Shane van Gisbergen | Report |
| (Queensland) Castrol Edge Townsville 400 | Townsville Street Circuit | Townsville, Queensland | DVS 4 | 8–10 July | Jack Le Brocq | |
| (Queensland) Coates Hire Ipswich SuperSprint | Queensland Raceway | Ipswich, Queensland | IVC 16; IVC 17 | 22–24 July | Shane van Gisbergen; Craig Lowndes | Report |
| (Queensland) Coates Hire Ipswich SuperSprint | Queensland Raceway | Ipswich, Queensland | KVTC 3 | 22–24 July | Taz Douglas | |
| (New South Wales) Red Rooster Sydney SuperSprint | Sydney Motorsport Park | Sydney, New South Wales | IVC 18; IVC 19 | 26–28 August | Shane van Gisbergen; Jamie Whincup | Report |
| (Victoria (state)) Phillip Island | Phillip Island Grand Prix Circuit | Phillip Island, Victoria | KVTC 4 | 9–11 September | Garry Jacobson | |
| (Victoria (state)) Wilson Security Sandown 500 | Sandown Raceway | Melbourne, Victoria | IVC 20 | 16–18 September | Garth Tander; Warren Luff | Report |
| (Victoria (state)) Wilson Security Sandown 500 | Sandown Raceway | Melbourne, Victoria | DVS 5 | 16–18 September | Garry Jacobson | |
| (New South Wales) Supercheap Auto Bathurst 1000 | Mount Panorama Circuit | Bathurst, New South Wales | IVC 21 | 6–9 October | Will Davison; Jonathon Webb | Report |
| (New South Wales) Supercheap Auto Bathurst 1000 | Mount Panorama Circuit | Bathurst, New South Wales | DVS 6 | 6–9 October | Paul Dumbrell | |
| (Queensland) Castrol Gold Coast 600 | Surfers Paradise Street Circuit | Surfers Paradise, Queensland | IVC 22; IVC 23 | 21–23 October | | Report |
| (New South Wales) Muscle Car Masters | Sydney Motorsport Park | Sydney, New South Wales | KVTC 5 | 28–30 October | | |
| (New Zealand) ITM Auckland SuperSprint | Pukekohe Park Raceway | Pukekohe, New Zealand | IVC 24; IVC 25; IVC 26; IVC 27 | 4–6 November | | Report |
| (New South Wales) Coates Hire Sydney 500 | Homebush Street Circuit | Sydney, New South Wales | IVC 28; IVC 29 | 25–27 November | | Report |
| (New South Wales) Coates Hire Sydney 500 | Homebush Street Circuit | Sydney, New South Wales | DVS 7 | 25–27 November | | |

- IVC – International V8 Supercars Championship
- DVS – V8 Supercars Dunlop Series
- KVTC – Kumho Tyres Australian V8 Touring Car Series
- NC – Non-championship
