= 2016 Coates Hire V8 Supercars Challenge =

(Victoria (state)) 2016 Coates Hire V8 Supercars Challenge
Event Information
- Date: 17–20 March 2016
- Location: Melbourne, Victoria
- Venue: Melbourne Grand Prix Circuit
- Weather: Thursday: fine Friday: mostly fine, light rain Saturday: mostly fine, light rain Sunday: fine

Results
Race 1
| Distance | 11 laps | 60 km |
| Pole position | Jamie Whincup; Triple Eight Race Engineering | 1:56.5634 |
| Winner | Shane van Gisbergen; Triple Eight Race Engineering | 26:24.0911 |
Race 2
| Distance | 12 laps | 65 km |
| Winner | Shane van Gisbergen; Triple Eight Race Engineering | 23:48.6448 |
Race 3
| Distance | 12 laps | 65 km |
| Winner | Jamie Whincup; Triple Eight Race Engineering | 23:47.6194 |
Race 4
| Distance | 12 laps | 65 km |
| Winner | Shane van Gisbergen; Triple Eight Race Engineering | 23:53.8276 |
Round Results
| First | Shane van Gisbergen; Triple Eight Race Engineering | 294 pts |
| Second | Craig Lowndes; Triple Eight Race Engineering | 245 pts |
| Third | Fabian Coulthard; DJR Team Penske | 244 pts |

The 2016 Coates Hire V8 Supercars Challenge was a motor racing event for V8 Supercars, held on the weekend of 17 to 20 March 2016. The event was held at the Melbourne Grand Prix Circuit in Melbourne, Victoria, and consisted of one race of 60 kilometres in length and three races of 65 km in length. It was a non-championship event, contested by teams taking part in the 2016 International V8 Supercars Championship, and was held in support of the 2016 Australian Grand Prix. The event was the 31st running of the V8 Supercars Challenge.

The event was won by Shane van Gisbergen, who took victory in three of the four races across the weekend. Craig Lowndes and Fabian Coulthard completed the podium. The pole sitter, Jamie Whincup, won the other race and finished sixth overall after retiring from the final race.

== Report ==
=== Background ===
Chris Pither contested the event in one of Prodrive Racing Australia's Dunlop Series cars, with his car from the Clipsal 500 Adelaide not being repaired in time following an accident in the second race there.

Rolling starts began being used at the event in 2014, with the pole sitter being required to maintain a certain speed before accelerating within a designated zone on the pit straight, at which point the race would start and all other drivers could also accelerate. Following a multi-car crash at the start of the final race of the 2015 event, as well as comments from drivers, the procedure for the start of the race was changed prior to the first race. The red lights above the start line were used to indicate the start of the race, with control taken away from the pole sitter.

=== Qualifying ===
A single 30-minute qualifying session was held on Thursday afternoon to set the grid for the first race. Jamie Whincup set a time of 1:56.5634 to take pole position, two one-hundredths of a second faster than Mark Winterbottom. Fabian Coulthard and Chaz Mostert were also with one-tenth of a second of Whincup's time.

=== Race 1 ===
The first race of the weekend took place on Friday afternoon and was scheduled to be 12 laps and 65 km in length. However, due to time constraints, it was shortened to 11 laps. Whincup maintained the lead at the start, while his teammate Shane van Gisbergen moved up to second place having started in fifth. Jason Bright was spun by Scott Pye at the first corner and his car suffered damage to the front spoiler. The spoiler caught under the front wheel going into Turn 3 and Bright went off the road before stopping his car off the circuit between Turns 3 and 4. Coulthard made a move up the inside of Winterbottom at Turn 11, but the pair made contact and Winterbottom spun and dropped to the back of the field.

At the end of the first lap, Todd Kelly's car had an engine problem and he stopped at the pit lane exit. The safety car was deployed to allow Kelly's car to be collected. The race was restarted on lap 5 and Van Gisbergen took the lead from Whincup at Turn 14 after the latter had locked a front brake going into Turn 13. Coulthard also tried to pass Whincup but was unable to do so. Mostert passed Coulthard for third place on lap 9. Van Gisbergen went on to take victory, half a second ahead of Whincup, with Mostert, Coulthard and Pye completing the top five.

=== Race 2 ===
The second race took place on Friday evening, with the starting grid based on the finishing order of the first race. Van Gisbergen and Whincup led the field away from the front row of the grid ahead of Mostert and Coulthard. Contact between David Reynolds, Tim Blanchard and Andre Heimgartner at the first corner saw Heimgartner spin. Blanchard made a pit stop at the end of the first lap to repair damage sustained in the collision. Pye locked a brake and went off at Turn 1 on lap 2, dropping to 17th place. James Moffat retired from the race after damaging a steering arm on the same lap.

Light rain began to fall on lap 5 and Mostert went off the circuit at the first corner on lap 6, letting both Lowndes and Coulthard past. Lowndes began closing the gap to Whincup, while Holden Racing Team drivers Garth Tander and James Courtney were involved in a close battle for sixth place. Heimgartner retired from the race on lap 10 after going off the circuit with a flat tyre. Lowndes passed Whincup on the final lap to take second place behind Van Gisbergen, with Whincup completing a 1-2-3 result for Triple Eight Race Engineering. Coulthard held off Mostert for fourth place ahead of Tander and Courtney. Winterbottom, after starting in 21st place, finished twelfth.

=== Race 3 ===
The third race was held on Saturday afternoon, with the starting grid based on the finishing order of the second race. Todd Kelly's car had another engine problem on the warm-up lap, the third time in total for the weekend, and he did not start the race. Van Gisbergen led Lowndes and Whincup away from the start while Tander moved up to fourth place. Whincup took second when Lowndes made contact with the rear of Van Gisbergen at Turn 3. An incident between Bright, Moffat and Dale Wood at the end of the first lap saw Bright retire from the race with damage, while Moffat also pitted for repairs. Whincup took the lead from Van Gisbergen at the start of lap 2.

Will Davison was spun by Cameron Waters on lap 4, the latter given a drive-through penalty for his part in the incident. McLaughlin retired from the race on lap 6, running off the track with low oil pressure while in seventh place. Whincup pulled out a lead while Van Gisbergen and Lowndes battled in the closing stages, going on to win by 6.6 seconds. Tander finished fourth ahead of Coulthard and Mostert.

==== Post-race ====
Whincup was fined A$3,000 for performing a burnout in celebration of his race victory, mimicking the penalty that Winterbottom had received for the same indiscretion at the 2015 Wilson Security Sandown 500. Wood was given a five-place grid penalty for Race 4 after he was found guilty of careless driving in the incident with Bright.

=== Race 4 ===
The fourth and final race was held on Sunday afternoon, with the starting grid based on the total points scored across the first three races. Van Gisbergen started from pole position ahead of Whincup, Lowndes, Coulthard and Mostert. Coulthard moved into second place at the first corner, while Reynolds and Pither made contact, forcing the latter off the circuit. Reynolds retired at the end of the first lap due to damage sustained in the incident. Whincup retired from the race on lap 3 with a driveline problem.

Coulthard applied pressure to Van Gisbergen early in the race, but Van Gisbergen started to pull away towards the end of the race and took his third win of the weekend. Coulthard finished second ahead of Lowndes, while Courtney passed Caruso for fourth place on the final lap. With three race wins and a second place, Van Gisbergen secured the overall weekend victory.

== Results ==
=== Qualifying ===
| Pos. | No. | Driver | Team | Car | Time |
|---|---|---|---|---|---|
| 1 | 88 | (Australia) Jamie Whincup | Triple Eight Race Engineering | Holden VF Commodore | 1:56.5634 |
| 2 | 1 | (Australia) Mark Winterbottom | Prodrive Racing Australia | Ford FG X Falcon | 1:56.5835 |
| 3 | 12 | (New Zealand) Fabian Coulthard | DJR Team Penske | Ford FG X Falcon | 1:56.6320 |
| 4 | 55 | (Australia) Chaz Mostert | Rod Nash Racing | Ford FG X Falcon | 1:56.6516 |
| 5 | 97 | (New Zealand) Shane van Gisbergen | Triple Eight Race Engineering | Holden VF Commodore | 1:56.7117 |
| 6 | 8 | (Australia) Jason Bright | Brad Jones Racing | Holden VF Commodore | 1:56.9699 |
| 7 | 888 | (Australia) Craig Lowndes | Triple Eight Race Engineering | Holden VF Commodore | 1:56.9826 |
| 8 | 23 | (Australia) Michael Caruso | Nissan Motorsport | Nissan Altima L33 | 1:56.9980 |
| 9 | 22 | (Australia) James Courtney | Holden Racing Team | Holden VF Commodore | 1:57.0123 |
| 10 | 17 | (Australia) Scott Pye | DJR Team Penske | Ford FG X Falcon | 1:57.1207 |
| 11 | 6 | (Australia) Cameron Waters | Prodrive Racing Australia | Ford FG X Falcon | 1:57.1438 |
| 12 | 33 | (New Zealand) Scott McLaughlin | Garry Rogers Motorsport | Volvo S60 | 1:57.1516 |
| 13 | 15 | (Australia) Rick Kelly | Nissan Motorsport | Nissan Altima L33 | 1:57.2191 |
| 14 | 9 | (Australia) David Reynolds | Erebus Motorsport | Holden VF Commodore | 1:57.2243 |
| 15 | 2 | (Australia) Garth Tander | Holden Racing Team | Holden VF Commodore | 1:57.2995 |
| 16 | 19 | (Australia) Will Davison | Tekno Autosports | Holden VF Commodore | 1:57.4989 |
| 17 | 111 | (New Zealand) Chris Pither | Super Black Racing | Ford FG X Falcon | 1:57.5309 |
| 18 | 14 | (Australia) Tim Slade | Brad Jones Racing | Holden VF Commodore | 1:57.5712 |
| 19 | 7 | (Australia) Todd Kelly | Nissan Motorsport | Nissan Altima L33 | 1:57.6707 |
| 20 | 18 | (Australia) Lee Holdsworth | Team 18 | Holden VF Commodore | 1:57.6987 |
| 21 | 3 | (New Zealand) Andre Heimgartner | Lucas Dumbrell Motorsport | Holden VF Commodore | 1:57.8298 |
| 22 | 222 | (Australia) Nick Percat | Lucas Dumbrell Motorsport | Holden VF Commodore | 1:57.8449 |
| 23 | 96 | (Australia) Dale Wood | Nissan Motorsport | Nissan Altima L33 | 1:57.9831 |
| 24 | 34 | (Australia) James Moffat | Garry Rogers Motorsport | Volvo S60 | 1:57.9870 |
| 25 | 21 | (Australia) Tim Blanchard | Britek Motorsport | Holden VF Commodore | 1:58.0837 |
| 26 | 4 | (Australia) Aaren Russell | Erebus Motorsport | Holden VF Commodore | 1:59.2893 |

=== Race 1 ===
| Pos. | No. | Driver | Team | Car | Laps | Time/Retired | Grid | Points |
|---|---|---|---|---|---|---|---|---|
| 1 | 97 | (New Zealand) Shane van Gisbergen | Triple Eight Race Engineering | Holden VF Commodore | 11 | 26:24.0911 | 5 | 75 |
| 2 | 88 | (Australia) Jamie Whincup | Triple Eight Race Engineering | Holden VF Commodore | 11 | +0.5 s | 1 | 69 |
| 3 | 55 | (Australia) Chaz Mostert | Rod Nash Racing | Ford FG X Falcon | 11 | +2.6 s | 4 | 64 |
| 4 | 12 | (New Zealand) Fabian Coulthard | DJR Team Penske | Ford FG X Falcon | 11 | +3.6 s | 3 | 60 |
| 5 | 17 | (Australia) Scott Pye | DJR Team Penske | Ford FG X Falcon | 11 | +4.5 s | 10 | 55 |
| 6 | 2 | (Australia) Garth Tander | Holden Racing Team | Holden VF Commodore | 11 | +5.1 s | 15 | 51 |
| 7 | 888 | (Australia) Craig Lowndes | Triple Eight Race Engineering | Holden VF Commodore | 11 | +6.4 s | 7 | 48 |
| 8 | 22 | (Australia) James Courtney | Holden Racing Team | Holden VF Commodore | 11 | +7.4 s | 9 | 45 |
| 9 | 33 | (New Zealand) Scott McLaughlin | Garry Rogers Motorsport | Volvo S60 | 11 | +8.4 s | 12 | 42 |
| 10 | 6 | (Australia) Cameron Waters | Prodrive Racing Australia | Ford FG X Falcon | 11 | +9.0 s | 11 | 39 |
| 11 | 23 | (Australia) Michael Caruso | Nissan Motorsport | Nissan Altima L33 | 11 | +9.5 s | 8 | 36 |
| 12 | 14 | (Australia) Tim Slade | Brad Jones Racing | Holden VF Commodore | 11 | +9.8 s | 18 | 34 |
| 13 | 15 | (Australia) Rick Kelly | Nissan Motorsport | Nissan Altima L33 | 11 | +11.3 s | 13 | 33 |
| 14 | 111 | (New Zealand) Chris Pither | Super Black Racing | Ford FG X Falcon | 11 | +12.3 s | 17 | 31 |
| 15 | 18 | (Australia) Lee Holdsworth | Team 18 | Holden VF Commodore | 11 | +12.8 s | 20 | 30 |
| 16 | 19 | (Australia) Will Davison | Tekno Autosports | Holden VF Commodore | 11 | +13.9 s | 16 | 28 |
| 17 | 9 | (Australia) David Reynolds | Erebus Motorsport | Holden VF Commodore | 11 | +16.0 s | 14 | 27 |
| 18 | 34 | (Australia) James Moffat | Garry Rogers Motorsport | Volvo S60 | 11 | +18.3 s | 24 | 25 |
| 19 | 96 | (Australia) Dale Wood | Nissan Motorsport | Nissan Altima L33 | 11 | +18.8 s | 23 | 24 |
| 20 | 21 | (Australia) Tim Blanchard | Britek Motorsport | Holden VF Commodore | 11 | +19.3 s | 25 | 22 |
| 21 | 1 | (Australia) Mark Winterbottom | Prodrive Racing Australia | Ford FG X Falcon | 11 | +19.7 s | 2 | 21 |
| 22 | 3 | (New Zealand) Andre Heimgartner | Lucas Dumbrell Motorsport | Holden VF Commodore | 11 | +22.5 s | 21 | 19 |
| 23 | 4 | (Australia) Aaren Russell | Erebus Motorsport | Holden VF Commodore | 11 | +24.7 s | 26 | 18 |
| 24 | 222 | (Australia) Nick Percat | Lucas Dumbrell Motorsport | Holden VF Commodore | 11 | +34.8 s | 22 | 16 |
| Ret | 7 | (Australia) Todd Kelly | Nissan Motorsport | Nissan Altima L33 | 1 | Engine | 19 | |
| Ret | 8 | (Australia) Jason Bright | Brad Jones Racing | Holden VF Commodore | 0 | Accident damage | 6 | |

=== Race 2 ===
| Pos. | No. | Driver | Team | Car | Laps | Time/Retired | Grid | Points |
|---|---|---|---|---|---|---|---|---|
| 1 | 97 | (New Zealand) Shane van Gisbergen | Triple Eight Race Engineering | Holden VF Commodore | 12 | 23:48.6448 | 1 | 75 |
| 2 | 888 | (Australia) Craig Lowndes | Triple Eight Race Engineering | Holden VF Commodore | 12 | +3.8 s | 7 | 69 |
| 3 | 88 | (Australia) Jamie Whincup | Triple Eight Race Engineering | Holden VF Commodore | 12 | +4.5 s | 2 | 64 |
| 4 | 12 | (New Zealand) Fabian Coulthard | DJR Team Penske | Ford FG X Falcon | 12 | +8.2 s | 4 | 60 |
| 5 | 55 | (Australia) Chaz Mostert | Rod Nash Racing | Ford FG X Falcon | 12 | +8.6 s | 3 | 55 |
| 6 | 2 | (Australia) Garth Tander | Holden Racing Team | Holden VF Commodore | 12 | +11.4 s | 6 | 51 |
| 7 | 22 | (Australia) James Courtney | Holden Racing Team | Holden VF Commodore | 12 | +11.6 s | 8 | 48 |
| 8 | 33 | (New Zealand) Scott McLaughlin | Garry Rogers Motorsport | Volvo S60 | 12 | +13.0 s | 9 | 45 |
| 9 | 14 | (Australia) Tim Slade | Brad Jones Racing | Holden VF Commodore | 12 | +17.1 s | 12 | 42 |
| 10 | 23 | (Australia) Michael Caruso | Nissan Motorsport | Nissan Altima L33 | 12 | +17.2 s | 11 | 39 |
| 11 | 15 | (Australia) Rick Kelly | Nissan Motorsport | Nissan Altima L33 | 12 | +17.5 s | 13 | 36 |
| 12 | 1 | (Australia) Mark Winterbottom | Prodrive Racing Australia | Ford FG X Falcon | 12 | +17.9 s | 21 | 34 |
| 13 | 6 | (Australia) Cameron Waters | Prodrive Racing Australia | Ford FG X Falcon | 12 | +20.4 s | 10 | 33 |
| 14 | 19 | (Australia) Will Davison | Tekno Autosports | Holden VF Commodore | 12 | +20.6 s | 16 | 31 |
| 15 | 111 | (New Zealand) Chris Pither | Super Black Racing | Ford FG X Falcon | 12 | +23.4 s | 14 | 30 |
| 16 | 9 | (Australia) David Reynolds | Erebus Motorsport | Holden VF Commodore | 12 | +24.9 s | 17 | 28 |
| 17 | 17 | (Australia) Scott Pye | DJR Team Penske | Ford FG X Falcon | 12 | +25.2 s | 5 | 27 |
| 18 | 7 | (Australia) Todd Kelly | Nissan Motorsport | Nissan Altima L33 | 12 | +25.6 s | 25 | 25 |
| 19 | 96 | (Australia) Dale Wood | Nissan Motorsport | Nissan Altima L33 | 12 | +26.1 s | 19 | 24 |
| 20 | 18 | (Australia) Lee Holdsworth | Team 18 | Holden VF Commodore | 12 | +27.3 s | 15 | 22 |
| 21 | 8 | (Australia) Jason Bright | Brad Jones Racing | Holden VF Commodore | 12 | +29.4 s | 26 | 21 |
| 22 | 222 | (Australia) Nick Percat | Lucas Dumbrell Motorsport | Holden VF Commodore | 12 | +31.2 s | 24 | 19 |
| 23 | 4 | (Australia) Aaren Russell | Erebus Motorsport | Holden VF Commodore | 12 | +35.5 s | 23 | 18 |
| 24 | 21 | (Australia) Tim Blanchard | Britek Motorsport | Holden VF Commodore | 10 | +2 laps | 20 | 16 |
| Ret | 3 | (New Zealand) Andre Heimgartner | Lucas Dumbrell Motorsport | Holden VF Commodore | 10 | Tyre | 22 | |
| Ret | 34 | (Australia) James Moffat | Garry Rogers Motorsport | Volvo S60 | 1 | Steering | 18 | |

=== Race 3 ===
| Pos. | No. | Driver | Team | Car | Laps | Time/Retired | Grid | Points |
|---|---|---|---|---|---|---|---|---|
| 1 | 88 | (Australia) Jamie Whincup | Triple Eight Race Engineering | Holden VF Commodore | 12 | 23:47.6194 | 3 | 75 |
| 2 | 97 | (New Zealand) Shane van Gisbergen | Triple Eight Race Engineering | Holden VF Commodore | 12 | +6.6 s | 1 | 69 |
| 3 | 888 | (Australia) Craig Lowndes | Triple Eight Race Engineering | Holden VF Commodore | 12 | +6.9 s | 2 | 64 |
| 4 | 2 | (Australia) Garth Tander | Holden Racing Team | Holden VF Commodore | 12 | +7.5 s | 6 | 60 |
| 5 | 12 | (New Zealand) Fabian Coulthard | DJR Team Penske | Ford FG X Falcon | 12 | +10.1 s | 4 | 55 |
| 6 | 55 | (Australia) Chaz Mostert | Rod Nash Racing | Ford FG X Falcon | 12 | +10.7 s | 5 | 51 |
| 7 | 22 | (Australia) James Courtney | Holden Racing Team | Holden VF Commodore | 12 | +11.2 s | 7 | 48 |
| 8 | 23 | (Australia) Michael Caruso | Nissan Motorsport | Nissan Altima L33 | 12 | +11.5 s | 10 | 45 |
| 9 | 14 | (Australia) Tim Slade | Brad Jones Racing | Holden VF Commodore | 12 | +15.7 s | 9 | 42 |
| 10 | 15 | (Australia) Rick Kelly | Nissan Motorsport | Nissan Altima L33 | 12 | +17.5 s | 11 | 39 |
| 11 | 1 | (Australia) Mark Winterbottom | Prodrive Racing Australia | Ford FG X Falcon | 12 | +18.1 s | 12 | 36 |
| 12 | 17 | (Australia) Scott Pye | DJR Team Penske | Ford FG X Falcon | 12 | +18.8 s | 17 | 34 |
| 13 | 111 | (New Zealand) Chris Pither | Super Black Racing | Ford FG X Falcon | 12 | +23.7 s | 15 | 33 |
| 14 | 18 | (Australia) Lee Holdsworth | Team 18 | Holden VF Commodore | 12 | +24.7 s | 20 | 31 |
| 15 | 9 | (Australia) David Reynolds | Erebus Motorsport | Holden VF Commodore | 12 | +25.1 s | 16 | 30 |
| 16 | 96 | (Australia) Dale Wood | Nissan Motorsport | Nissan Altima L33 | 12 | +26.4 s | 19 | 28 |
| 17 | 21 | (Australia) Tim Blanchard | Britek Motorsport | Holden VF Commodore | 10 | +27.0 s | 24 | 27 |
| 18 | 222 | (Australia) Nick Percat | Lucas Dumbrell Motorsport | Holden VF Commodore | 12 | +27.4 s | 22 | 25 |
| 19 | 19 | (Australia) Will Davison | Tekno Autosports | Holden VF Commodore | 12 | +30.0 s | 14 | 24 |
| 20 | 3 | (New Zealand) Andre Heimgartner | Lucas Dumbrell Motorsport | Holden VF Commodore | 12 | +32.7 s | 25 | 22 |
| 21 | 4 | (Australia) Aaren Russell | Erebus Motorsport | Holden VF Commodore | 12 | +35.3 s | 23 | 21 |
| 22 | 6 | (Australia) Cameron Waters | Prodrive Racing Australia | Ford FG X Falcon | 12 | +59.0 s | 13 | 19 |
| 23 | 34 | (Australia) James Moffat | Garry Rogers Motorsport | Volvo S60 | 9 | +3 laps | 26 | 18 |
| Ret | 33 | (New Zealand) Scott McLaughlin | Garry Rogers Motorsport | Volvo S60 | 5 | Oil pressure | 8 | |
| Ret | 8 | (Australia) Jason Bright | Brad Jones Racing | Holden VF Commodore | 1 | Accident damage | 21 | |
| DNS | 7 | (Australia) Todd Kelly | Nissan Motorsport | Nissan Altima L33 | | Engine | | |

=== Race 4 ===
| Pos. | No. | Driver | Team | Car | Laps | Time/Retired | Grid | Points |
|---|---|---|---|---|---|---|---|---|
| 1 | 97 | (New Zealand) Shane van Gisbergen | Triple Eight Race Engineering | Holden VF Commodore | 12 | 23:53.8276 | 1 | 75 |
| 2 | 12 | (New Zealand) Fabian Coulthard | DJR Team Penske | Ford FG X Falcon | 12 | +1.3 s | 4 | 69 |
| 3 | 888 | (Australia) Craig Lowndes | Triple Eight Race Engineering | Holden VF Commodore | 12 | +2.8 s | 3 | 64 |
| 4 | 22 | (Australia) James Courtney | Holden Racing Team | Holden VF Commodore | 12 | +4.0 s | 7 | 60 |
| 5 | 23 | (Australia) Michael Caruso | Nissan Motorsport | Nissan Altima L33 | 12 | +4.5 s | 8 | 55 |
| 6 | 2 | (Australia) Garth Tander | Holden Racing Team | Holden VF Commodore | 12 | +6.4 s | 6 | 51 |
| 7 | 17 | (Australia) Scott Pye | DJR Team Penske | Ford FG X Falcon | 12 | +7.3 s | 10 | 48 |
| 8 | 15 | (Australia) Rick Kelly | Nissan Motorsport | Nissan Altima L33 | 12 | +7.7 s | 11 | 45 |
| 9 | 55 | (Australia) Chaz Mostert | Rod Nash Racing | Ford FG X Falcon | 12 | +10.0 s | 5 | 42 |
| 10 | 14 | (Australia) Tim Slade | Brad Jones Racing | Holden VF Commodore | 12 | +10.4 s | 9 | 39 |
| 11 | 1 | (Australia) Mark Winterbottom | Prodrive Racing Australia | Ford FG X Falcon | 12 | +11.9 s | 13 | 36 |
| 12 | 33 | (New Zealand) Scott McLaughlin | Garry Rogers Motorsport | Volvo S60 | 12 | +13.9 s | 15 | 34 |
| 13 | 19 | (Australia) Will Davison | Tekno Autosports | Holden VF Commodore | 12 | +14.3 s | 18 | 33 |
| 14 | 6 | (Australia) Cameron Waters | Prodrive Racing Australia | Ford FG X Falcon | 12 | +16.4 s | 14 | 31 |
| 15 | 222 | (Australia) Nick Percat | Lucas Dumbrell Motorsport | Holden VF Commodore | 12 | +21.2 s | 20 | 30 |
| 16 | 34 | (Australia) James Moffat | Garry Rogers Motorsport | Volvo S60 | 12 | +25.1 s | 22 | 28 |
| 17 | 8 | (Australia) Jason Bright | Brad Jones Racing | Holden VF Commodore | 12 | +25.6 s | 26 | 27 |
| 18 | 96 | (Australia) Dale Wood | Nissan Motorsport | Nissan Altima L33 | 12 | +26.5 s | 24 | 25 |
| 19 | 18 | (Australia) Lee Holdsworth | Team 18 | Holden VF Commodore | 12 | +27.0 s | 17 | 24 |
| 20 | 7 | (Australia) Todd Kelly | Nissan Motorsport | Nissan Altima L33 | 12 | +27.6 s | 25 | 22 |
| 21 | 21 | (Australia) Tim Blanchard | Britek Motorsport | Holden VF Commodore | 10 | +28.3 s | 19 | 21 |
| 22 | 3 | (New Zealand) Andre Heimgartner | Lucas Dumbrell Motorsport | Holden VF Commodore | 12 | +28.7 s | 23 | 19 |
| 23 | 111 | (New Zealand) Chris Pither | Super Black Racing | Ford FG X Falcon | 12 | +29.4 s | 12 | 18 |
| 24 | 4 | (Australia) Aaren Russell | Erebus Motorsport | Holden VF Commodore | 12 | +35.9 s | 21 | 16 |
| Ret | 88 | (Australia) Jamie Whincup | Triple Eight Race Engineering | Holden VF Commodore | 2 | Driveline | 2 | |
| Ret | 9 | (Australia) David Reynolds | Erebus Motorsport | Holden VF Commodore | 0 | Accident damage | 16 | |

=== Round results ===
| Pos. | No. | Driver | Team | Car | R1 | R2 | R3 | R4 | Points |
|---|---|---|---|---|---|---|---|---|---|
| 1 | 97 | (New Zealand) Shane van Gisbergen | Triple Eight Race Engineering | Holden VF Commodore | 75 | 75 | 69 | 75 | 294 |
| 2 | 888 | (Australia) Craig Lowndes | Triple Eight Race Engineering | Holden VF Commodore | 48 | 69 | 64 | 64 | 245 |
| 3 | 12 | (New Zealand) Fabian Coulthard | DJR Team Penske | Ford FG X Falcon | 60 | 60 | 55 | 69 | 244 |
| 4 | 2 | (Australia) Garth Tander | Holden Racing Team | Holden VF Commodore | 51 | 51 | 60 | 51 | 213 |
| 5 | 55 | (Australia) Chaz Mostert | Rod Nash Racing | Ford FG X Falcon | 64 | 55 | 51 | 42 | 212 |
| 6 | 88 | (Australia) Jamie Whincup | Triple Eight Race Engineering | Holden VF Commodore | 69 | 64 | 75 | 0 | 208 |
| 7 | 22 | (Australia) James Courtney | Holden Racing Team | Holden VF Commodore | 45 | 48 | 48 | 60 | 201 |
| 8 | 23 | (Australia) Michael Caruso | Nissan Motorsport | Nissan Altima L33 | 36 | 39 | 45 | 55 | 175 |
| 9 | 17 | (Australia) Scott Pye | DJR Team Penske | Ford FG X Falcon | 55 | 27 | 34 | 48 | 164 |
| 10 | 14 | (Australia) Tim Slade | Brad Jones Racing | Holden VF Commodore | 34 | 42 | 42 | 39 | 157 |
| 11 | 15 | (Australia) Rick Kelly | Nissan Motorsport | Nissan Altima L33 | 33 | 36 | 39 | 45 | 153 |
| 12 | 1 | (Australia) Mark Winterbottom | Prodrive Racing Australia | Ford FG X Falcon | 21 | 34 | 36 | 36 | 127 |
| 13 | 6 | (Australia) Cameron Waters | Prodrive Racing Australia | Ford FG X Falcon | 39 | 33 | 19 | 31 | 122 |
| 14 | 33 | (New Zealand) Scott McLaughlin | Garry Rogers Motorsport | Volvo S60 | 42 | 45 | 0 | 34 | 121 |
| 15 | 19 | (Australia) Will Davison | Tekno Autosports | Holden VF Commodore | 28 | 31 | 24 | 33 | 116 |
| 16 | 111 | (New Zealand) Chris Pither | Super Black Racing | Ford FG X Falcon | 31 | 30 | 33 | 18 | 112 |
| 17 | 18 | (Australia) Lee Holdsworth | Team 18 | Holden VF Commodore | 30 | 22 | 31 | 24 | 107 |
| 18 | 96 | (Australia) Dale Wood | Nissan Motorsport | Nissan Altima L33 | 24 | 24 | 28 | 25 | 101 |
| 19 | 222 | (Australia) Nick Percat | Lucas Dumbrell Motorsport | Holden VF Commodore | 16 | 19 | 25 | 30 | 90 |
| 20 | 21 | (Australia) Tim Blanchard | Britek Motorsport | Holden VF Commodore | 22 | 16 | 27 | 21 | 86 |
| 21 | 9 | (Australia) David Reynolds | Erebus Motorsport | Holden VF Commodore | 27 | 28 | 30 | 0 | 85 |
| 22 | 4 | (Australia) Aaren Russell | Erebus Motorsport | Holden VF Commodore | 18 | 18 | 21 | 16 | 73 |
| 23 | 34 | (Australia) James Moffat | Garry Rogers Motorsport | Volvo S60 | 25 | 0 | 18 | 28 | 71 |
| 24 | 3 | (New Zealand) Andre Heimgartner | Lucas Dumbrell Motorsport | Holden VF Commodore | 19 | 0 | 22 | 19 | 60 |
| 25 | 8 | (Australia) Jason Bright | Brad Jones Racing | Holden VF Commodore | 0 | 21 | 0 | 27 | 48 |
| 26 | 7 | (Australia) Todd Kelly | Nissan Motorsport | Nissan Altima L33 | 0 | 25 | 0 | 22 | 47 |

== See also ==
- 2016 V8 Supercar season
