= 2016 Bahrain Grand Prix =

Formula One motor race held in 2016

Race 2 of 21 in the 2016 Formula One World Championship
← Previous race	Next race →

Race details
- Date: 3 April 2016
- Official name: 2016 Formula 1 Gulf Air Bahrain Grand Prix
- Location: Bahrain International Circuit; Sakhir, Bahrain
- Course: Permanent Racing Facility
- Course length: 5.412 km (3.363 miles)
- Distance: 57 laps, 308.238 km (191.530 miles)
- Weather: Dry; 21–22 °C (70–72 °F) air temperature 26–29 °C (79–84 °F) track temperature 2 m/s (6.6 ft/s) wind from the southwest
- Attendance: 92,000 (Weekend)

Pole position
Driver	(United Kingdom) Lewis Hamilton	Mercedes
- Time: 1:29.493

Fastest lap
Driver	(Germany) Nico Rosberg	Mercedes
- Time: 1:34.482 on lap 41

Podium
First	(Germany) Nico Rosberg	Mercedes
Second	(Finland) Kimi Räikkönen	Ferrari
Third	(United Kingdom) Lewis Hamilton	Mercedes

The 2016 Bahrain Grand Prix (formally known as the 2016 Formula 1 Gulf Air Bahrain Grand Prix) was a Formula One motor race that was held on 3 April 2016 at the Bahrain International Circuit in Sakhir, Bahrain. The race was the second round of the 2016 FIA Formula One World Championship and marked the twelfth time that the Bahrain Grand Prix had been run as a round of the Formula One World Championship. Lewis Hamilton was the defending race winner, while his Mercedes team-mate, Nico Rosberg was the Drivers' Championship leader coming into the round.

During qualifying, which saw the second iteration of the heavily criticised "elimination format", Hamilton achieved pole position ahead of Rosberg and Ferrari's Sebastian Vettel. Rosberg won the race from Kimi Räikkönen, with Hamilton completing the podium. The elimination format of qualifying was dropped after this race with it eventually decided that sport would revert to previous iteration of the three segment qualifying used between 2006 and 2015 from the Chinese Grand Prix onwards.

== Report ==
=== Background ===
Following widespread criticism over the "elimination" qualifying format used in Australia, the teams voted to abandon the format and revert to the system used between 2006 and 2015. However, in the week after the race, the sport's Strategy Working Group met to formally vote on the matter, and chose to keep the "elimination" format in place for the Bahrain Grand Prix and subject to a more thorough review ahead of the next round in China. It was subsequently reported that the teams had only been given the option of retaining the elimination format or adopting a hybrid of the elimination and pre-2016 formats, and that an outright reversion to the 2006-2015 format was never discussed. Mercedes' motorsport director Toto Wolff remained adamant that the format needed to be reverted, saying that he did not expect qualifying to be more entertaining than it had been two weeks before. Drivers were equally critical of the retention of the changed format: Ferrari's Sebastian Vettel told the press that he was "as disappointed as probably anyone I know", while Mercedes's Lewis Hamilton called the decision "strange [...], particularly because the most important thing is the fans were unhappy". Another meeting was scheduled for race day to discuss the format, with both Jean Todt, president of the FIA, and Bernie Ecclestone, Formula One's commercial rights holder, in attendance.

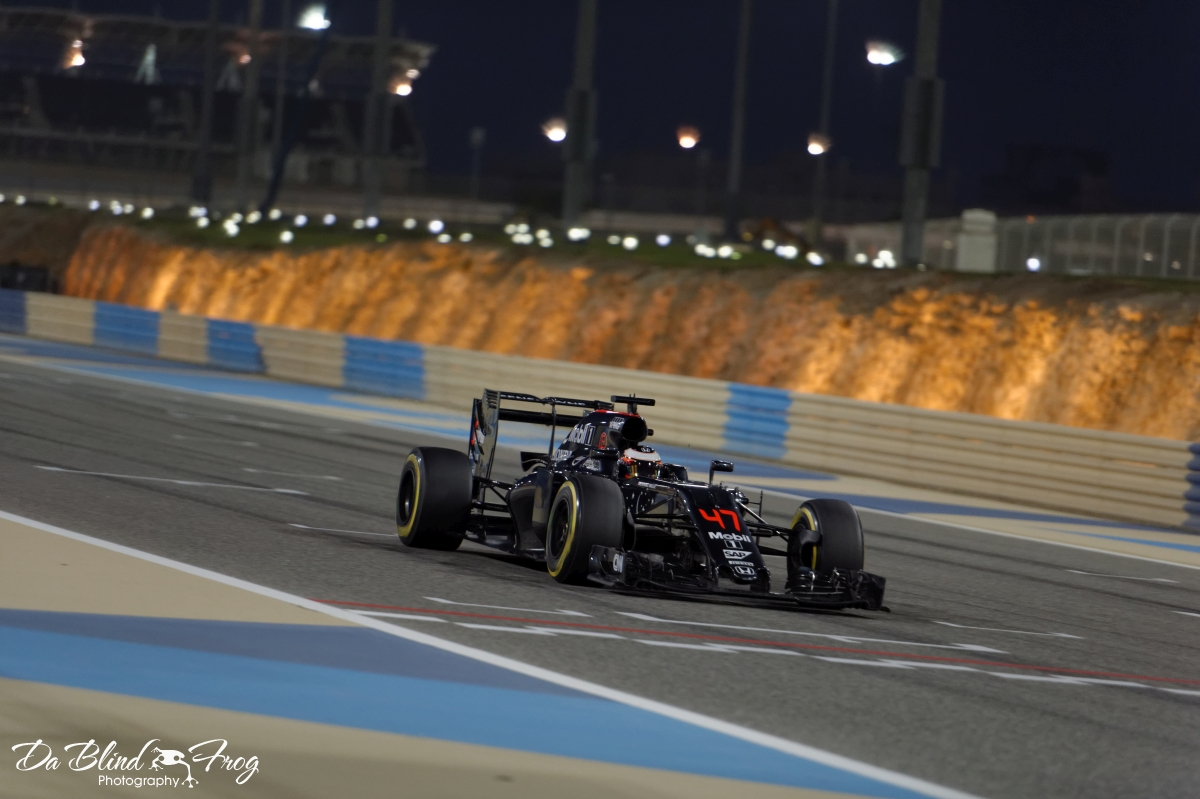
Stoffel Vandoorne replaced Fernando Alonso at McLaren.

In the aftermath of a collision with Esteban Gutiérrez in the Australian Grand Prix, Fernando Alonso was ruled out of the event with broken ribs and a pneumothorax, and as a result was replaced with McLaren reserve driver Stoffel Vandoorne. Gutiérrez received a new chassis after his team found that his original chassis was too damaged to be repaired, mostly caused by the crane during the recovery process and not in the accident itself. Meanwhile, Ferrari were able to use the same engine in Kimi Räikkönen's car as they had done in Australia, even though it had caught fire following a failure of the turbo charger. Swift reactions by the team on the scene prevented damage to the combustion engine, with only the turbo changed for Bahrain. Alfonso Celis Jr. made his first appearance in a Formula One session during the first free practice for Force India.

Tyre supplier Pirelli brought three compounds to Bahrain, from which drivers were allowed to choose. The three options for the event were the super-soft, soft and medium compounds, the same as for the previous round in Australia. Frontrunners Mercedes and Ferrari opted for different strategies in tyre allocation, as Mercedes took only one set of the harder medium tyres for both their drivers, while Ferrari chose three sets at the expense of soft compound tyres.

As in previous years, the race was accompanied by concerns about the human rights situation in Bahrain. The Bahrain Institute for Rights and Democracy wrote an open letter to Jean Todt in the week before the race, pointing out that "severe human rights violations have been committed during the race authorised by the FIA" and urged the sport's governing body to be "prepared to cancel the race in coming years."

=== Free practice ===
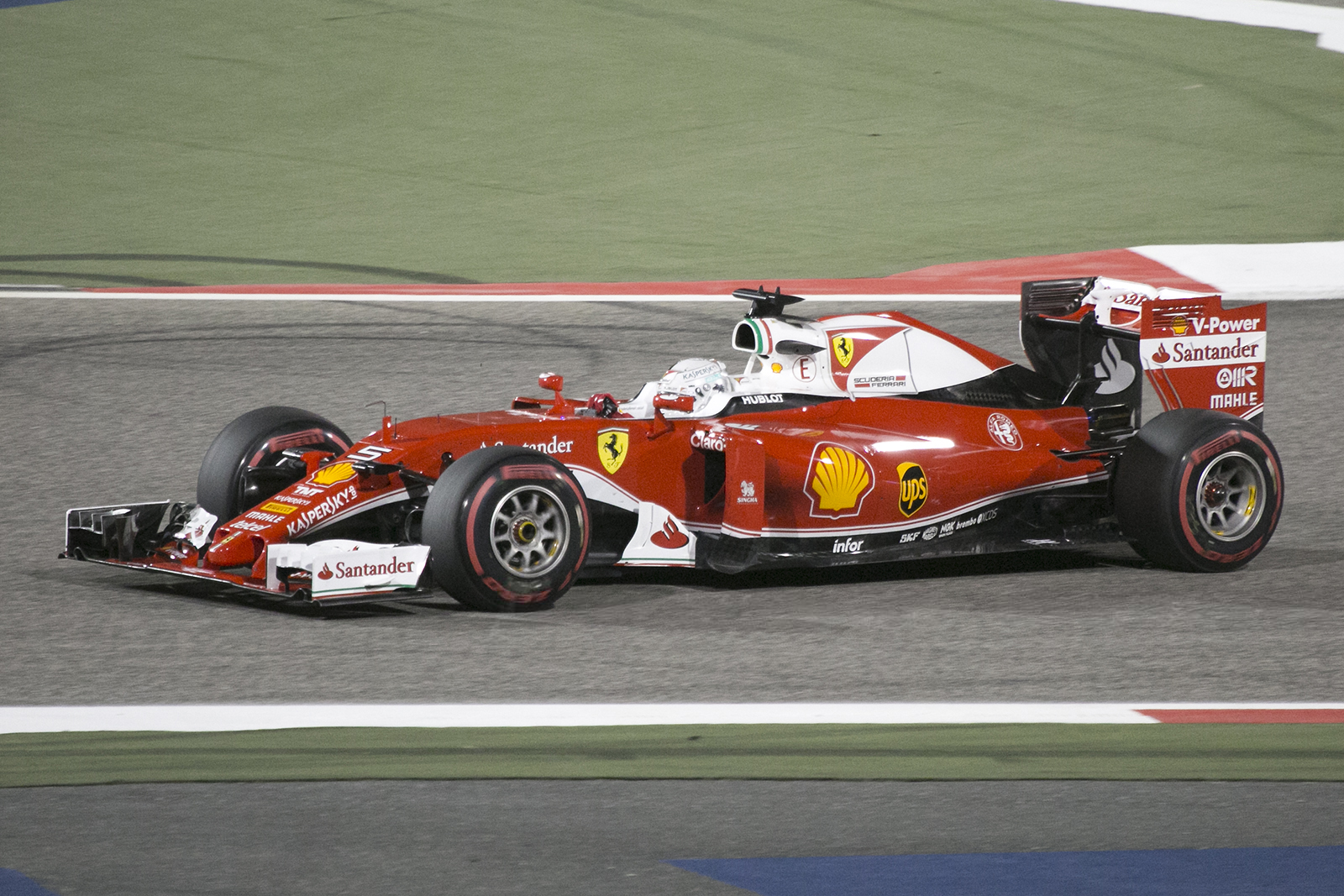
Sebastian Vettel was fastest in third practice.

Per the regulations for the 2016 season, three practice sessions were held, two ninety-minute sessions on Friday and another one-hour session before qualifying on Saturday. During the first practice session on Friday, Mercedes set times well clear of their closest rivals. Nico Rosberg was fastest on a time of 1:32.292, more than half a second quicker than his teammate Lewis Hamilton in second place. Kimi Räikkönen was third-fastest, albeit almost two seconds slower than Rosberg. Newcomers Stoffel Vandoorne and Alfonso Celis Jr. were 18th- and 21st-fastest, respectively, both slower than their teammates. Celis went off track at one point at turn 3, leading him to back off the pace in order not to damage the car, as his responsibility laid mainly with gathering information for the team. The session was marked by unusually cool weather, said to be representative of the expected race conditions for Sunday's race, held at night. Therefore, many teams decided to send their cars out for a large number of laps, with sixteen drivers recording twenty laps or more.

Rosberg was again fastest in the second practice session on Friday evening. His time of 1:31.001 was more than one and a half seconds faster than the pole position time in the previous year's event. Lewis Hamilton finished second-fastest, 0.241 seconds adrift of Rosberg. Jenson Button set the third-fastest time for McLaren, although he was more than a second off the fastest time. Several drivers voiced surprise over McLaren's pace during Friday's practice sessions, described by Button as the team's best "for a couple of years". Max Verstappen followed in fourth, ahead of the two Ferrari cars of Räikkönen and Vettel. The latter had set the third-fastest time on the soft tyre compound, but mistakes during his runs on the super-soft tyres meant that he was unable to place higher than sixth. He had to end his session fifteen minutes early when his rear-left wheel nut came loose. Vandoorne was eleventh-fastest in his second session, while Sergio Pérez, who took back the car from Celis, was fifteenth, two places ahead of his teammate Nico Hülkenberg. Vibrations from running over the kerbs caused the front wing on Romain Grosjean's car to dislodge, forcing him off track. He was able to get back into the pitlane and had the wing replaced. At the end of the session, Renault's Kevin Magnussen failed to stop for weighing, instead returning to his garage, where work was conducted on his car. As a consequence, he was forced to start the race from the pitlane.

Sebastian Vettel led a Ferrari 1–2 in third practice ahead of Räikkönen, setting a time of 1:31.683. The two Mercedes drivers of Rosberg and Hamilton followed, ahead of Valtteri Bottas and Romain Grosjean. On the soft compound tyres, both Mercedes drivers had set identical times, before Rosberg edged out Hamilton on the super-softs. Higher temperatures in the afternoon sun meant that the times dropped from second practice. Felipe Massa ran a new, shorter nase for Williams, but managed only the ninth-fastest time, more than half a second slower than teammate Bottas. Not running the super-soft tyres, Toro Rosso got its two drivers on 15th and 16th place, respectively. Jolyon Palmer was 20th-fastest before puncturing a tyre at the end of the session.

=== Qualifying ===
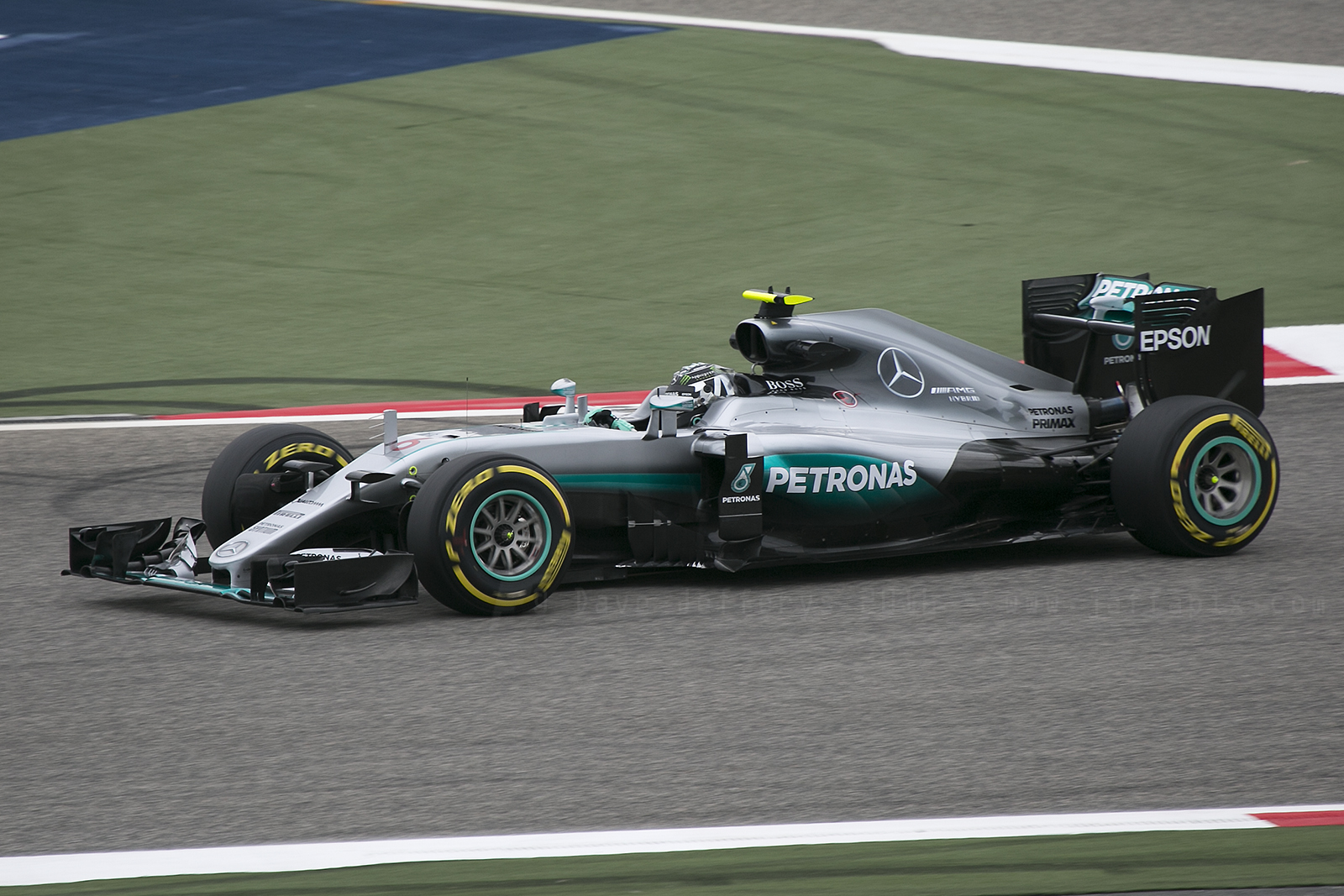
Nico Rosberg qualified second and went on to win the race.

Qualifying on Saturday was contested under the retained 2016 "elimination format" regulations. Just as in years before, the qualifying procedure was divided into three parts, with the first part (Q1) running for 16 minutes and the second and third parts (Q2 and Q3) being 15 and 14 minutes long, respectively. All twenty-two cars contested the first part, with seven drivers eliminated from further contention in each of the first two parts of qualifying, leaving eight drivers to compete for pole position in Q3. However, in a change of rules, drivers were now eliminated during the session, with the slowest runner at a given point being taken out from contention every ninety seconds, beginning seven minutes into Q1, six minutes into Q2 and five minutes into Q3. At the beginning of Q1, all cars set fast laps, before the top placed drivers returned to the pitlane, leaving the track to the ones fighting elimination. Felipe Nasr and Rio Haryanto were unable to set a second timed lap and with the former making a mistake on his only lap, he qualified in last place. While Jolyon Palmer improved his lap time on his second lap, he was quickly dropped back into elimination by a faster lap from Stoffel Vandoorne. Pascal Wehrlein qualified in 16th place, ahead of Force India's Sergio Pérez. Kevin Magnussen qualified 19th, but his penalty during practice meant that he would still need to start from the pit lane.

The second part of qualifying started problematically, as the red light at the end of the pitlane, indicating that cars had to stop, was still on when the clock began to run. A marshal with a green flag then indicated the drivers to take to the track. During the session, Lewis Hamilton set the fastest time, but a mistake by Nico Rosberg meant that Vettel was able to place second. Daniil Kvyat was the first driver to be eliminated, lining up behind the two McLaren drivers, with debutant Vandoorne out-qualifying his teammate Button. Nico Hülkenberg was the only driver to go out to improve his time, managing to proceed into Q3 in eighth place, leaving Grosjean, Max Verstappen and Carlos Sainz Jr. behind.

As the frontrunners set their first timed laps in Q3, Hamilton made a mistake and ran wide at the last corner, leaving him behind Rosberg and both Ferrari drivers. Hülkenberg, both Williams drivers and Ricciardo were eliminated without setting another time, while the four fastest cars came out again. Hamilton set the fastest ever lap at the Bahrain Circuit, at 1:29.493, to achieve pole position ahead of Rosberg, who was just 0.077 seconds slower. Half a second behind, Vettel grabbed third place on the grid ahead of teammate Räikkönen. After qualifying, Hamilton's pole was put under threat after the FIA started an investigation after Hamilton reversed in the pit lane to park up. Hamilton was given a reprimand and his pole position stood.

==== Post-qualifying ====
Reactions to the qualifying sessions mirrored those from two weeks before, with many commentators repeating their criticism over the new format. However, at a meeting between the FIA, Formula One Management (FOM) and the teams on race Sunday, no agreement was reached to revert to the old qualifying format, which was outright ruled out for the remainder of the season by the representatives of FIA and FOM. A new proposal was set before the teams, which would see every driver set two timed laps in every part of qualifying. Both times would than be added and the aggregate time would determine the grid positions. Reactions to the proposal were mixed. While Sebastian Vettel described it as "a shit idea" and Daniel Ricciardo said that he "wouldn't be too keen on that", Jenson Button deemed it a better plan than the existing elimination format. On 7 April, the teams unanimously rejected the scheme, instead demanding a return to the format used between 2006 and 2015. The decision was finalised four days later.

=== Race ===
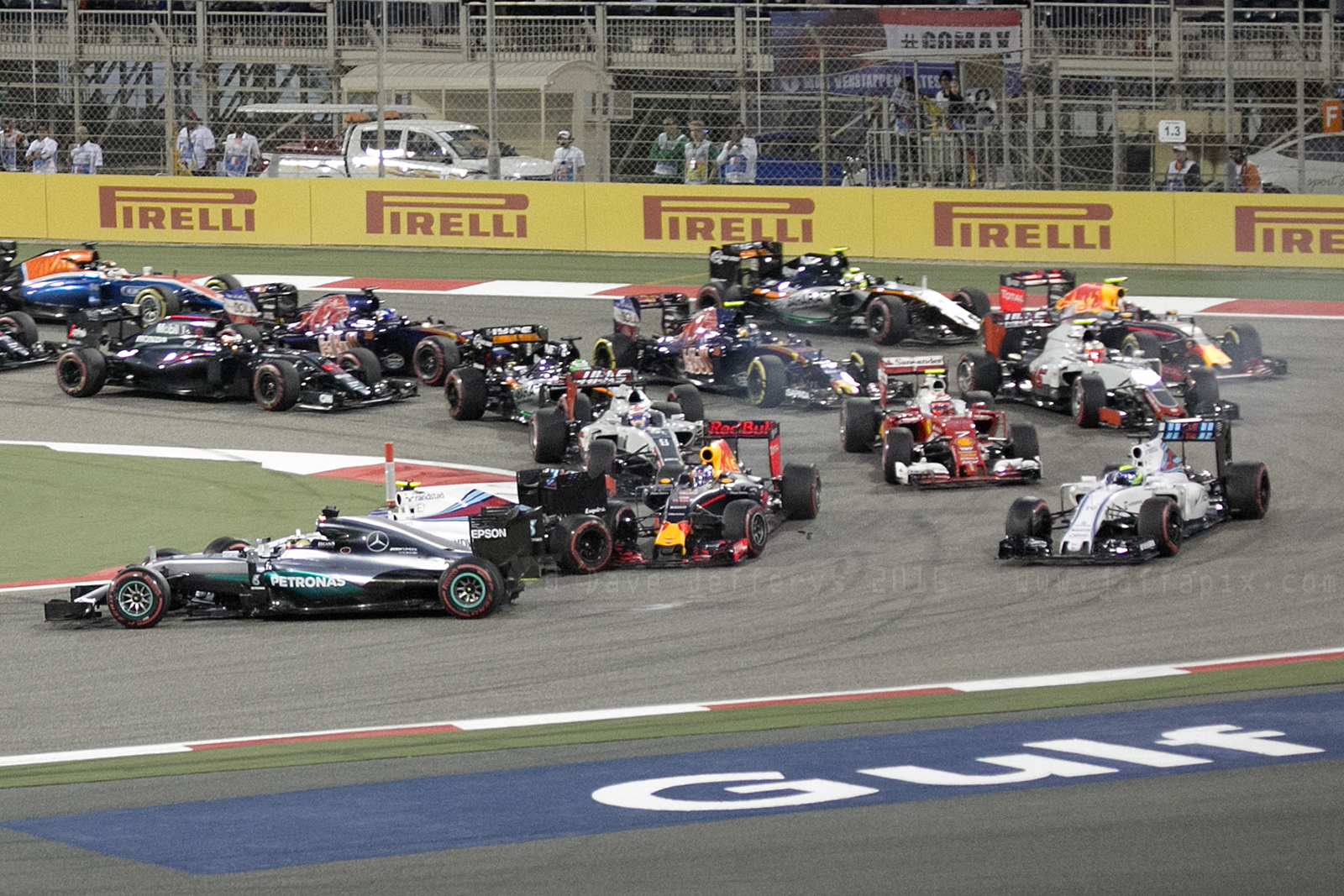
The accident between Bottas, Hamilton and Ricciardo at turn one

The race saw two drivers out before the start lights even went out, as first Sebastian Vettel stopped on track during the warm-up lap with an engine failure before Jolyon Palmer pulled into the pit lane instead of lining up on the grid, suffering from a hydraulic failure. It was the first time in Vettel's Formula One career that he was unable to start a race. At the start, Rosberg pulled into the lead ahead of Hamilton, who came into contact with Valtteri Bottas and dropped back to ninth place. Both Bottas and Ricciardo damaged their front wings in the situation. Felipe Massa took advantage and moved into second behind Rosberg. Further back, Sergio Pérez and Carlos Sainz also made contact, leaving Sainz with a puncture and Pérez with front wing damaged and both had to pit for repairs. Daniil Kvyat and Nico Hülkenberg were two more victims of contact during the first lap. The order after five laps was Rosberg, Massa, Bottas, Ricciardo and Räikkönen, who took fourth a lap later. The same lap, Jenson Button retired with a failure of his energy recovery system. After yet another lap, Räikkönen moved ahead of Bottas as well into third. Hamilton recovered from his first-turn accident and soon moved ahead of Bottas as well, laying in fourth place on lap eight. On lap ten, Bottas received a drive-through penalty for his collision with Hamilton at the start. By lap eleven, Esteban Gutiérrez retired with brake failure, while his teammate Grosjean was in fourth place.

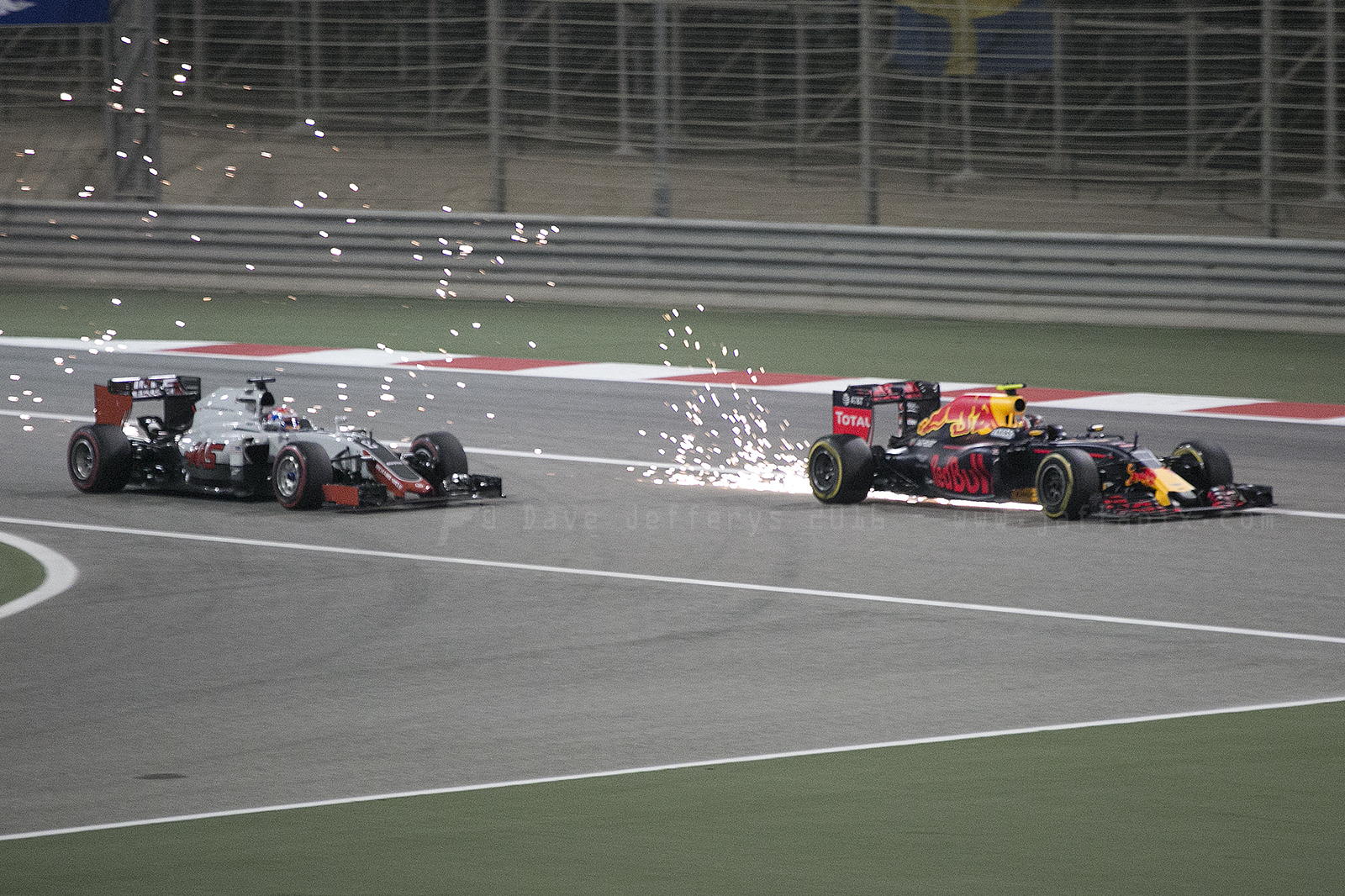
Daniel Ricciardo passes Romain Grosjean for fourth.

Kimi Räikkönen was the first of the front runners to pit, doing so on lap twelve, with Rosberg and Hamilton following suit in the following laps. Hamilton emerged sixth behind Kvyat and Massa, moving ahead of both into fourth before going past Ricciardo for third place on lap 17. A lap later, Grosjean moved ahead of Massa into fifth position. Meanwhile, Rosberg pulled clear at the head of the race, leading Räikkönen by twelve seconds on lap 22. Further back the order, Kevin Magnussen trailed Pascal Wehrlein's Manor, being unable to overtake him due to the Manor's straight-line speed advantage. Grosjean made another overtake on lap 25, moving past Ricciardo into fourth, while the latter made a pit stop for new tyres at the end of the lap. Three laps later, he used his fresher tyres to overtake his teammate Kvyat for fifth position. While Carlos Sainz retired, more pit stops started on lap 29, with Hamilton, Räikkönen and Grosjean coming in for tyre changes, followed by Massa one lap later. Rosberg made a pit stop another lap later, coming back out securely in the lead, while Hamilton closed on Räikkönen, now 3.7 seconds behind him. The order at that point stood as: Rosberg, Räikkönen, Hamilton, Ricciardo, Kvyat, Grosjean, Verstappen, Bottas, Vandoorne and Massa.

By lap 38, Nico Rosberg led Räikkönen by nine seconds, with Hamilton a further five seconds behind. Räikkönen made a pit stop on the same lap and both Mercedes drivers did the same in the two following laps. Grosjean made a pit stop on lap 41, being stationary for 25 seconds, losing ground on his competitors. He emerged eighth and moved ahead of Kvyat into seventh as the latter made a pit stop on lap 45, before overtaking Massa one lap later. With ten laps to go, Rosberg extended his lead on Räikkönen, who had moved closer after the last round of stops. On lap 51, Kvyat went past Bottas into eighth place, while Wehrlein moved ahead of Hülkenberg into 13th one lap later. Wehrlein then unsuccessfully chased Marcus Ericsson's Sauber, unable to pass for twelfth. As Rosberg extended his advantage on Räikkönen to eight seconds, Kvyat overtook Massa to move into seventh on lap 56. Nico Rosberg was able to hold on to his lead to win the race ahead of Räikkönen and Hamilton. Behind Ricciardo in fourth, Grosjean improved on his result from Australia to finish fifth. On his début, Stoffel Vandoorne scored a point in tenth position. Haas F1's sixth and fifth places from their first two races in Formula One marked the best start to a season from a new team since Shadow in 1973.

=== Post-race ===
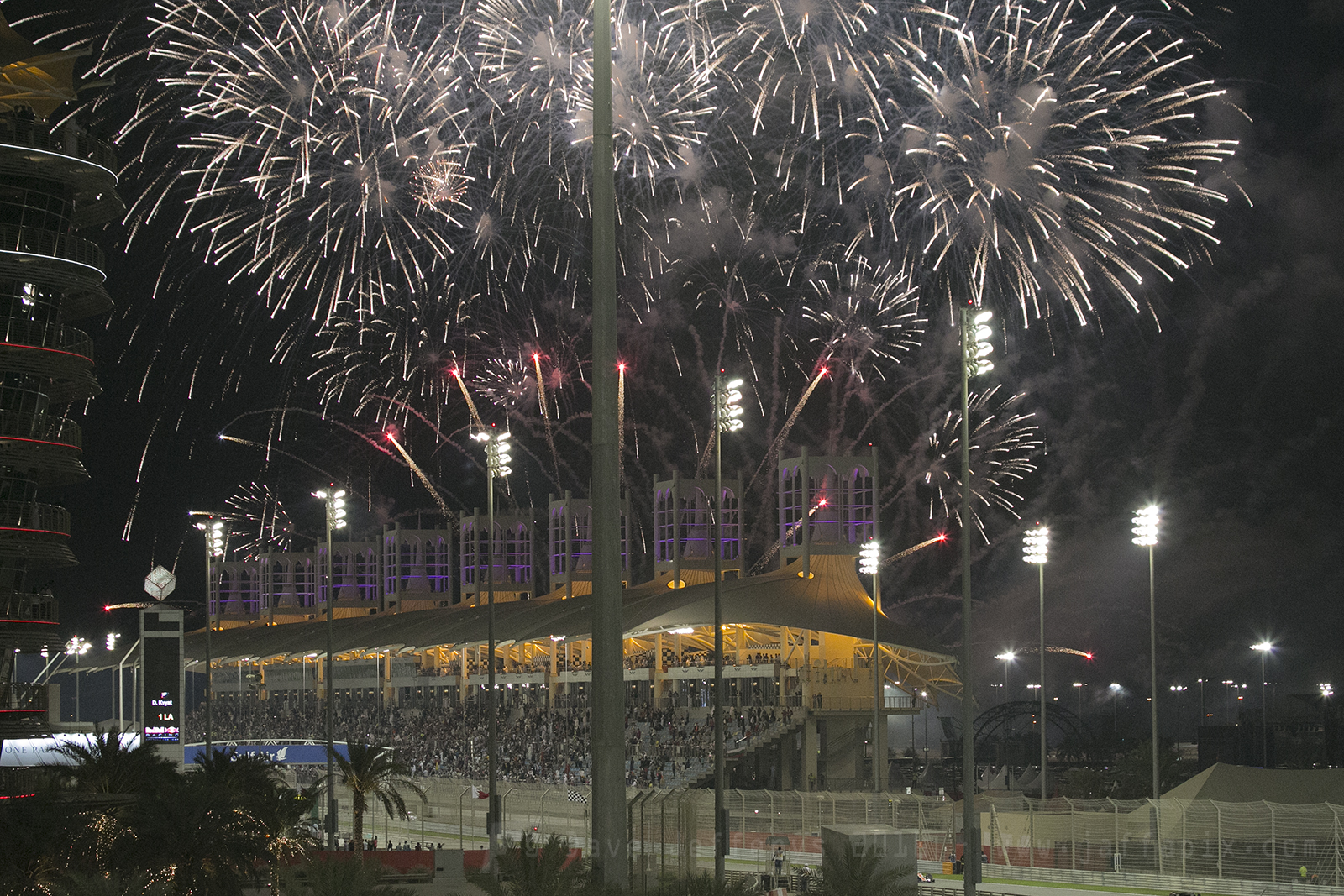
Fireworks after the race

At the post-race podium interviews, conducted by former Formula 1 driver David Coulthard, Nico Rosberg hailed an "awesome weekend" and said that the start had been the key factor to his victory. Kimi Räikkönen and Ferrari in turn lamented their dismal start, saying that it might have cost him the victory. Ferrari team principal Maurizio Arrivabene lauded Räikkönen's drive as "absolutely spectacular", adding: "If you look at the overtake around the outside of [Daniel] Ricciardo, he reminded me of the driver from the old times. It was very, very good for me." Lewis Hamilton rued his second unfortunate start incident in a row, which he described as "perhaps [...] more painful" than the incident at the previous race. He stressed the fact that with the damage to his car from the first-turn contact he was unable to keep up Räikkönen's speed ahead of him.

Romain Grosjean received particular praise for his drive to fifth place, collecting a second Driver of the Day award in a row. His race was saved by an attentive mechanic who replaced a loose wheel nut on his left-rear wheel, which would otherwise have caused Grosjean to retire. Valtteri Bottas was further penalised for his collision with Hamilton at the start of the race by having two penalty points added to his licence. Jenson Button expressed frustration at his retirement, feeling that it lost him a possible point-scoring position. In contrast, his replacement teammate Vandoorne scored his first point on debut, describing it as a "bonus" to a successful weekend.

As a result of the race, Nico Rosberg manifested his lead at the top of the drivers' standings, having collected the maximum available 50 points from the first two races. Teammate Hamilton was in second place, 17 points behind Rosberg, with Ricciardo in third another nine points adrift. In the Constructors' Championship, Mercedes retained the lead with 83 points, 50 points ahead of Ferrari, while Red Bull in third was another three points behind.

== Classification ==
=== Qualifying ===
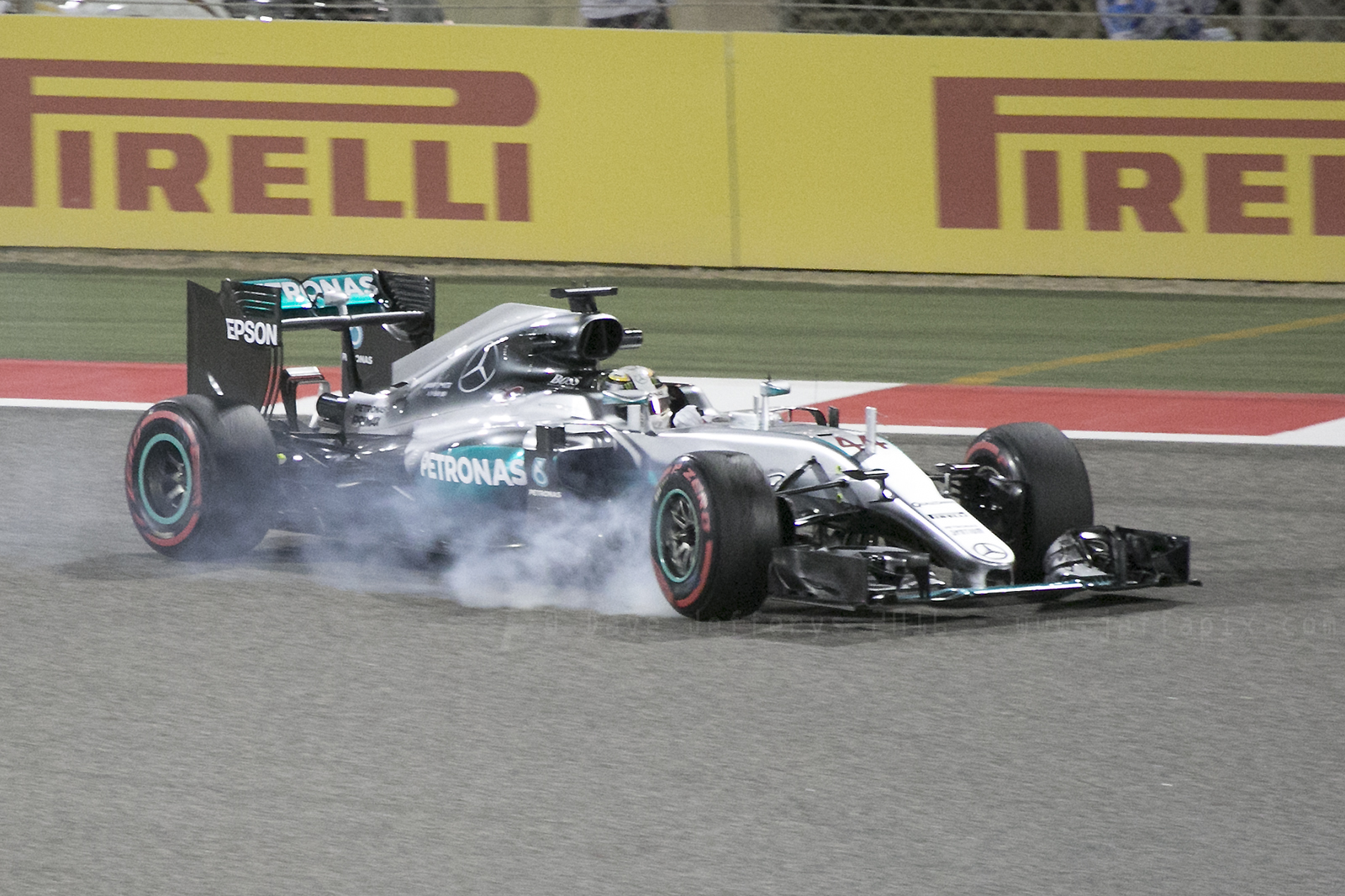
Lewis Hamilton qualified on pole position and had to fight back to third place after contact in the first corner.

Pos.	Car no.	Driver	Constructor	Qualifying times			Final grid
Pos.	Car no.	Driver	Constructor	Q1	Q2	Q3	Final grid
1	44	(United Kingdom) Lewis Hamilton	Mercedes	1:31.391	1:30.039	1:29.493	1
2	6	(Germany) Nico Rosberg	Mercedes	1:31.325	1:30.535	1:29.570	2
3	5	(Germany) Sebastian Vettel	Ferrari	1:31.636	1:30.409	1:30.012	3
4	7	(Finland) Kimi Räikkönen	Ferrari	1:31.685	1:30.559	1:30.244	4
5	3	(Australia) Daniel Ricciardo	Red Bull Racing-TAG Heuer	1:31.403	1:31.122	1:30.854	5
6	77	(Finland) Valtteri Bottas	Williams-Mercedes	1:31.672	1:30.931	1:31.153	6
7	19	(Brazil) Felipe Massa	Williams-Mercedes	1:32.045	1:31.374	1:31.155	7
8	27	(Germany) Nico Hülkenberg	Force India-Mercedes	1:31.987	1:31.604	1:31.620	8
9	8	(France) Romain Grosjean	Haas-Ferrari	1:32.005	1:31.756		9
10	33	(Netherlands) Max Verstappen	Toro Rosso-Ferrari	1:31.888	1:31.772		10
11	55	(Spain) Carlos Sainz Jr.	Toro Rosso-Ferrari	1:31.716	1:31.816		11
12	47	(Belgium) Stoffel Vandoorne	McLaren-Honda	1:32.472	1:31.934		12
13	21	(Mexico) Esteban Gutiérrez	Haas-Ferrari	1:32.118	1:31.945		13
14	22	(United Kingdom) Jenson Button	McLaren-Honda	1:31.976	1:31.998		14
15	26	(Russia) Daniil Kvyat	Red Bull Racing-TAG Heuer	1:32.559	1:32.241		15
16	94	(Germany) Pascal Wehrlein	MRT-Mercedes	1:32.806			16
17	9	(Sweden) Marcus Ericsson	Sauber-Ferrari	1:32.840			17
18	11	(Mexico) Sergio Pérez	Force India-Mercedes	1:32.911			18
19	20	(Denmark) Kevin Magnussen	Renault	1:33.181			PL^{1}
20	30	(United Kingdom) Jolyon Palmer	Renault	1:33.438			19
21	88	(Indonesia) Rio Haryanto	MRT-Mercedes	1:34.190			20
22	12	(Brazil) Felipe Nasr	Sauber-Ferrari	1:34.388			21
107% time: 1:37.717

Notes

- ^1 – Kevin Magnussen started the race from the pit lane as a penalty, after failing to stop for a mandatory weight check and the team instead conducting work on the car during free practice.

=== Race ===
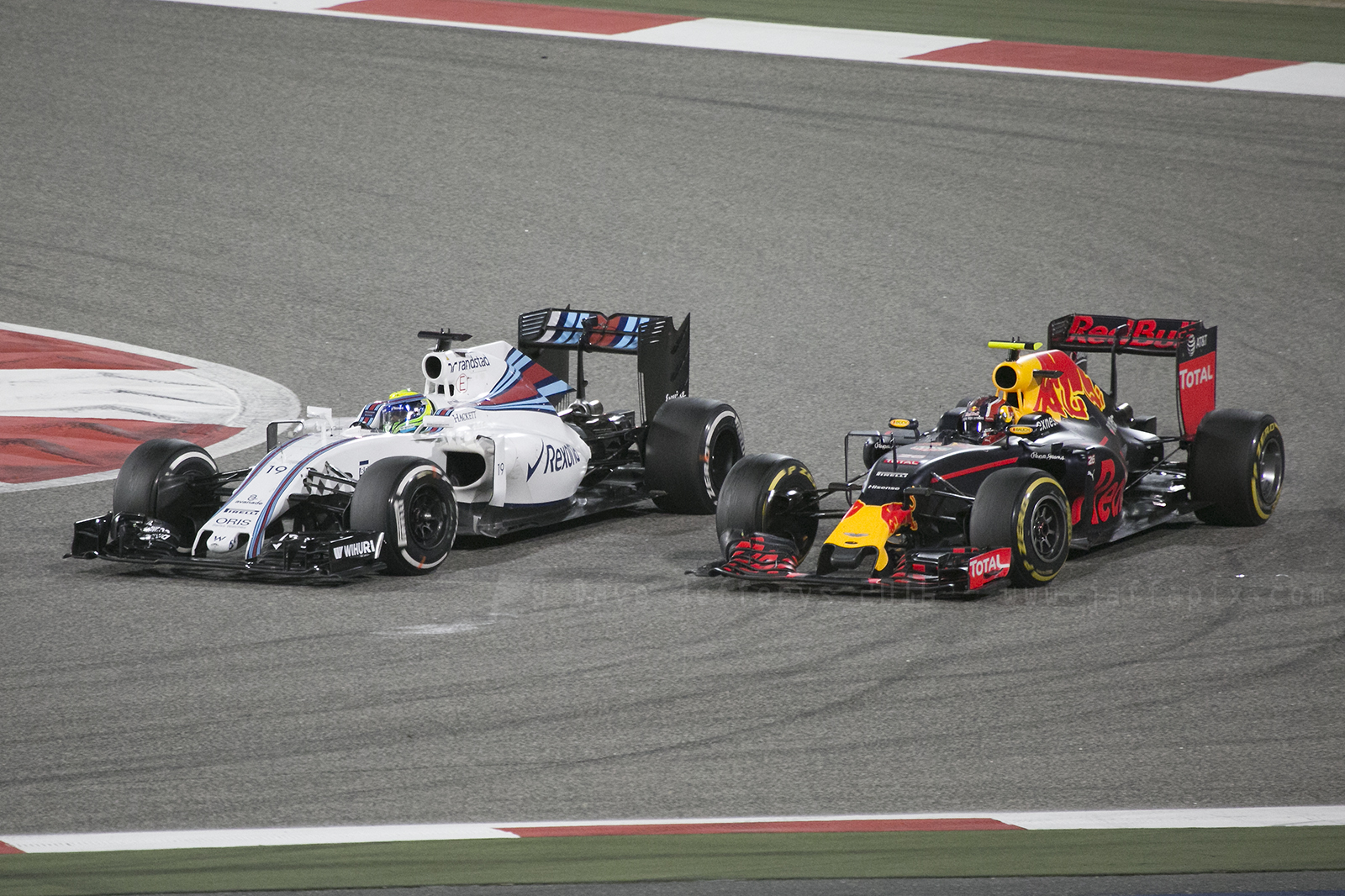
Daniil Kvyat (right) finished ahead of Felipe Massa in seventh place.

Pos.	No.	Driver	Constructor	Laps	Time/Retired	Grid	Pts.
1	6	(Germany) Nico Rosberg	Mercedes	57	1:33:34.696	2	25
2	7	(Finland) Kimi Räikkönen	Ferrari	57	+10.282	4	18
3	44	(United Kingdom) Lewis Hamilton	Mercedes	57	+30.148	1	15
4	3	(Australia) Daniel Ricciardo	Red Bull Racing-TAG Heuer	57	+1:02.494	5	12
5	8	(France) Romain Grosjean	Haas-Ferrari	57	+1:18.299	9	10
6	33	(Netherlands) Max Verstappen	Toro Rosso-Ferrari	57	+1:20.929	10	8
7	26	(Russia) Daniil Kvyat	Red Bull Racing-TAG Heuer	56	+1 Lap	15	6
8	19	(Brazil) Felipe Massa	Williams-Mercedes	56	+1 Lap	7	4
9	77	(Finland) Valtteri Bottas	Williams-Mercedes	56	+1 Lap	6	2
10	47	(Belgium) Stoffel Vandoorne	McLaren-Honda	56	+1 Lap	12	1
11	20	(Denmark) Kevin Magnussen	Renault	56	+1 Lap	PL	
12	9	(Sweden) Marcus Ericsson	Sauber-Ferrari	56	+1 Lap	17	
13	94	(Germany) Pascal Wehrlein	MRT-Mercedes	56	+1 Lap	16	
14	12	(Brazil) Felipe Nasr	Sauber-Ferrari	56	+1 Lap	21	
15	27	(Germany) Nico Hülkenberg	Force India-Mercedes	56	+1 Lap	8	
16	11	(Mexico) Sergio Pérez	Force India-Mercedes	56	+1 Lap	18	
17	88	(Indonesia) Rio Haryanto	MRT-Mercedes	56	+1 Lap	20	
Ret	55	(Spain) Carlos Sainz Jr.	Toro Rosso-Ferrari	29	Collision Damage	11	
Ret	21	(Mexico) Esteban Gutiérrez	Haas-Ferrari	10	Brakes	13	
Ret	22	(United Kingdom) Jenson Button	McLaren-Honda	6	Engine	14	
DNS	5	(Germany) Sebastian Vettel	Ferrari	0	Engine	—	
DNS	30	(United Kingdom) Jolyon Palmer	Renault	0	Hydraulics	—	

- Sebastian Vettel and Jolyon Palmer qualified 3rd and 19th, but did not make it to the starting grid; their grid slots were left vacant.

== Championship standings after the race ==
Drivers' Championship standings

	Pos.	Driver	Points
	1	(Germany) Nico Rosberg	50
	2	(United Kingdom) Lewis Hamilton	33
1	3	(Australia) Daniel Ricciardo	24
14	4	(Finland) Kimi Räikkönen	18
1	5	(France) Romain Grosjean	18

Constructors' Championship standings

	Pos.	Constructor	Points
	1	(Germany) Mercedes	83
	2	(Italy) Ferrari	33
1	3	(Austria) Red Bull Racing-TAG Heuer	30
1	4	(United Kingdom) Williams-Mercedes	20
	5	(United States) Haas-Ferrari	18

- Note: Only the top five positions are included for both sets of standings.

== See also ==
- 2016 TCR International Series Sakhir round

Previous race: 2016 Australian Grand Prix	FIA Formula One World Championship; 2016 season	Next race: 2016 Chinese Grand Prix
Previous race: 2015 Bahrain Grand Prix	Bahrain Grand Prix	Next race: 2017 Bahrain Grand Prix
