= 2016 Australian Grand Prix =

Formula One motor race held in 2016

Race 1 of 21 in the 2016 Formula One World Championship
Next race →

Race details
- Date: 20 March 2016
- Official name: 2016 Formula 1 Rolex Australian Grand Prix
- Location: Melbourne Grand Prix Circuit, Melbourne, Australia
- Course: Temporary street circuit
- Course length: 5.303 km (3.295 miles)
- Distance: 57 laps, 302.271 km (187.822 miles)
- Scheduled distance: 58 laps, 307.574 km (191.118 miles)
- Weather: Partly cloudy 22–23 °C (72–73 °F) air temperature 26–36 °C (79–97 °F) track temperature 4 m/s (8.9 mph; 14 km/h) wind from the south
- Attendance: 271,800 (Weekend)

Pole position
Driver	(United Kingdom) Lewis Hamilton	Mercedes
- Time: 1:23.837

Fastest lap
Driver	(Australia) Daniel Ricciardo	Red Bull Racing-TAG Heuer
- Time: 1:28.997 on lap 49

Podium
First	(Germany) Nico Rosberg	Mercedes
Second	(United Kingdom) Lewis Hamilton	Mercedes
Third	(Germany) Sebastian Vettel	Ferrari

The 2016 Australian Grand Prix (formally known as the 2016 Formula 1 Rolex Australian Grand Prix) was a Formula One motor race that was held on 20 March 2016 in Melbourne. The race was contested over fifty-seven laps of the Melbourne Grand Prix Circuit and was the first round of the 2016 FIA Formula One World Championship. The race marked the 81st race in the combined history of the Australian Grand Prix – which dates back to the 100 Miles Road Race of 1928 – and the 21st time the event was held at the Melbourne Grand Prix Circuit. Mercedes driver Nico Rosberg was the race winner.

Lewis Hamilton took the first pole position of the season and the fiftieth of his career in a qualifying session that saw the introduction of a new one-by-one elimination format that was widely criticised. His teammate Nico Rosberg took victory ahead of Hamilton and Ferrari's Sebastian Vettel. The race was stopped on lap 18 following an accident involving Fernando Alonso and Esteban Gutiérrez. Mercedes used the break for a change of tyres that allowed their drivers to take a 1–2 finish after Vettel had initially led the race from the start. Romain Grosjean finished sixth, scoring points for the Haas F1 team on their début, the first completely new team to do so since 2002. Mercedes equalled the record for most consecutive 1–2 finishes, by achieving their fifth in a row.

== Report ==
=== Background ===
==== Regulation changes ====
The race saw the introduction of a new qualifying system. As before, qualifying was divided into three parts. However, instead of eliminating the slowest drivers at the end of each respective session, the slowest driver at a given point was now eliminated from contention every ninety seconds, with the countdown starting some minutes into every session.

In a further change of regulations, tyre supplier Pirelli now made three instead of two tyre compounds available for each Grand Prix. For the Australian Grand Prix, these were the super-soft, soft and medium compounds. With Pirelli providing every driver with two sets of tyres for the race (of which one must be used) and an additional one for the third part of qualifying, drivers were able to choose ten additional sets of tyres out of the three compounds available. Notably, Mercedes drivers Lewis Hamilton and Nico Rosberg made different choices, with Rosberg opting for an additional set of mediums instead of soft tyres. The two Manor drivers chose the most conservative way, taking on four sets each of the medium and soft compounds.

The race saw the competitive debut of the Haas F1 Team, and its car, the Haas VF-16; and the return of Renault as a fully manufacturer-supported team after a four-year absence.

=== Free practice ===
Per the regulations for the 2016 season, three practice sessions were held, two 1.5-hour sessions on Friday and another one-hour session before qualifying on Saturday. Rain had fallen before the start of the first practice session, rendering the track wet and slippery, and drivers initially opted to go on their first laps on intermediate tyres. Nico Rosberg was the first to set a lap time, clocking in at 1:44.037, a time soon bettered by his Mercedes teammate Lewis Hamilton at 1:40.812. As conditions improved further, Kimi Räikkönen set a new fastest time after about half an hour of practice. Soon after, the track had dried enough for the drivers to go out on slick tyres, with Daniel Ricciardo setting the first time on the medium compound with 1:34.007. After around one hour of practice, Hamilton managed the best time of the session, at 1:29.725. Still, several wet spots on the track caused problems to a number of drivers, including Max Verstappen, who flat-spotted his tyres while spinning in turn six, as well as Valtteri Bottas and Rio Haryanto, who both had to pass through the gravel traps after slipping off the track. Shortly before the end of the session, rain returned and caught out many drivers, including Räikkönen and Ricciardo, whose Red Bull RB12 got stuck in a gravel pit at turn twelve.

Due to several rain showers between first and second practice, the track was again wet during the second session, which limited the drivers to using the intermediate tyres only. Hamilton was again fastest, setting a time of 1:38.841. Teammate Rosberg crashed at turn seven thirty minutes into the session, damaging a new-specification front wing that the team had deliberately not run in first practice for fear of damage. Rosberg later apologised for the incident, which saw him trying to get back to pit lane, before his team told him to stop on track, calling an early end to his session. Nico Hülkenberg, Räikkönen, Ricciardo and Carlos Sainz Jr. all finished within one second of Hamilton's time, while Sergio Pérez was at one point on his way to a new fastest time overall, setting best times in the first two timechecks along the track, before having to slow in the last part of the lap due to heavy rain. The two Manor drivers Pascal Wehrlein and Haryanto covered the highest number of laps, with 24 and 22 laps in 12th and 14th place respectively. Neither Renault nor Williams drivers set a time, albeit going on track. The Sauber cars and Max Verstappen's Toro Rosso did not leave the garage at all during the session.

Although rain fell on Saturday morning, the track had dried by the start of the final free practice session. Lewis Hamilton again set the fastest time with 1:25.624, less than two-tenths of a second in front of teammate Rosberg, with Sebastian Vettel in third position close behind. The fastest times had been set on the super-soft tyre compound. However, Mercedes's advantage over Ferrari proved more significant, up to seven-tenths of a second on the harder soft compound, the tyre most likely to be used in the race. Toro Rosso confirmed their good pace for the weekend with fourth and sixth place for Carlos Sainz and Max Verstappen respectively, being about half a second quicker than their sister team, Red Bull Racing. A major incident occurred just seconds after the beginning of the practice session, when Rio Haryanto and Romain Grosjean collided in the pit lane. Both cars needed to equip new front wings and Haas also changed the floor on Grosjean's car. Haryanto was later issued a three-place grid penalty for the incident, as well as two penalty points added to his licence.

=== Qualifying ===
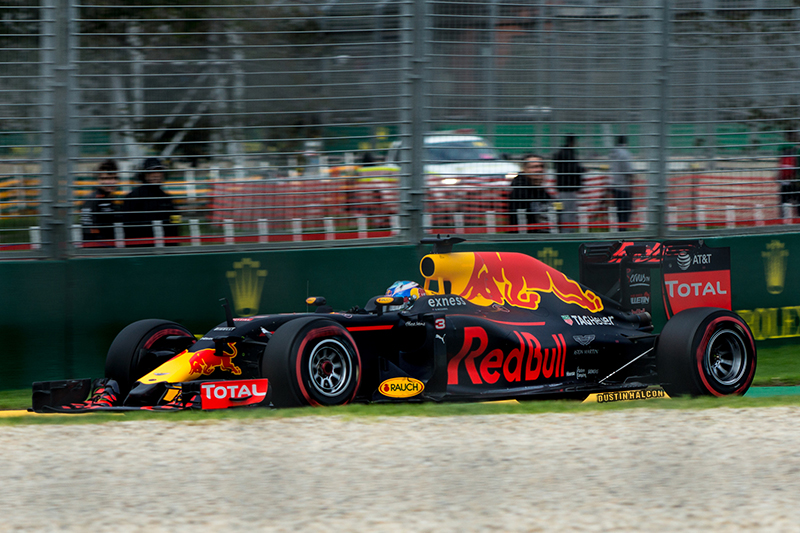
Daniel Ricciardo qualified eighth and went on to finish fourth in the race.

Qualifying got under way on Saturday afternoon with new rules in place. Just as in years before, the qualifying procedure was divided into three parts, with the first part (Q1) running for 16 minutes and the second and third parts (Q2 and Q3) being 15 and 14 minutes long respectively. All twenty-two cars contested the first part, with seven drivers eliminated from further contention in each of the first two parts of qualifying, leaving eight drivers to compete for pole position in Q3. However, in a change of rules, drivers were now eliminated during the session, with the slowest runner at a given point being taken out from contention every ninety seconds, beginning seven minutes into Q1, six minutes into Q2 and five minutes into Q3.

The new format meant that all cars took to the track quickly in Q1, with everyone setting lap times on the super-soft compound, the fastest tyre available at the event. The two Manor drivers were first to be eliminated, having set only one timed lap each, as were both Haas cars after them, being unable to cross the finishing line in time. The same fate caught out Daniil Kvyat, who qualified 18th. Both Sauber drivers were able to go out on a second timed lap, but proved too slow to avoid being the last to go out in Q1, after Renault rookie Jolyon Palmer was able to avoid elimination, setting a faster time towards the end of the session.

Q2 started with a busy track once more, but many of the top drivers elected not to go out on a second timed run after setting sufficient lap times first time around. The eliminated drivers were determined rather quickly, with the two Renault drivers qualifying 14th and 15th respectively. The two McLarens were next to go out of contention, before Bottas was eliminated for 11th place on the grid, failing to improve on his lap time. Both Force India drivers were the last not to make it into Q3, with Sergio Pérez beating his teammate Hülkenberg to ninth.

The third part of qualifying determined pole position and only the two Mercedes drivers set two timed laps. After he clocked in behind both Ferrari drivers in his first run, Rosberg improved to second place on his second time out, but was unable to challenge teammate Hamilton, who took the fiftieth pole position of his career. Every other driver was limited to only one timed lap and in the end, the two Ferrari cars of Vettel and Räikkönen locked out the second row on the grid ahead of Max Verstappen and Felipe Massa. Sainz and Ricciardo rounded up the top eight on the grid. Therefore, Q3 saw little running with the final positions determined very early on and drivers exiting their cars five minutes before the end of qualifying.

==== Post-qualifying ====
The new qualifying format was criticised immediately after the end of the session by pundits, drivers and team personnel alike. Sky Sports commentator Martin Brundle called for a swift revision of the rules, saying the procedure was "not acceptable" and calling for it to be abandoned before the next race. Mercedes's executive director Toto Wolff and former driver Johnny Herbert were equally critical, describing it as "rubbish" and "embarrassing". Red Bull team director Christian Horner was apologetic, describing the format as "[not] good for Formula One." Niki Lauda, non-executive chairman at Mercedes, was in agreement, calling it "a big mistake." Particular criticism was aimed at the fact that many drivers did not get enough time to improve on their lap times, seeing many getting out of their cockpits while still technically in contention. 1996 World Champion Damon Hill observed that pole-sitter Hamilton "could have waved his own chequered flag [...] with four minutes still to go." Nico Rosberg acknowledged that it had "not worked", while Sebastian Vettel was equally critical, describing it as "the wrong way to go." Lewis Hamilton joined the criticism but acknowledged the attempt to revitalise the format. Bernie Ecclestone, the commercial rights holder of Formula One, spoke out against the format as well, declaring it to be "pretty crap". On the day of the race, the teams of Formula 1 voted a proposal to go back to the qualifying format as it had been in previous seasons, which was rejected by the FIA's F1 Commission.

=== Race ===
At the end of the formation lap, Daniil Kvyat was unable to reach the grid due to an electrical issue. Therefore, the field went to another formation lap and the race was shortened accordingly to 57 laps. At the start proper, Vettel got away well, passing through both Mercedes cars into the lead, followed by his teammate Räikkönen in second. As Rosberg and Hamilton went through the first corner, Hamilton was forced wide and lost additional places, falling down to sixth. Kevin Magnussen suffered a puncture on the first lap and made a pit stop for new tyres, while Esteban Gutiérrez had mechanical issues at the back of the field. Hamilton was able to pass fifth-placed Massa on lap four, as Vettel was leading from Räikkonen, Rosberg and Verstappen. On lap eight, Sainz was the first of the top-ten runners to pit for new tyres. Meanwhile, Hamilton was unable to pass Verstappen for fourth, discussing alternative tactics with his team on the radio communication. Pascal Wehrlein had a good start in his debut as well, running in 14th place at that point of the race.

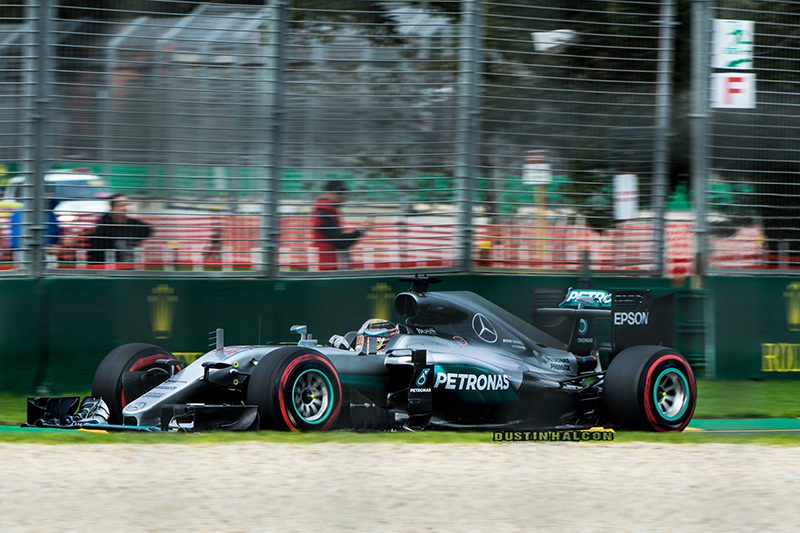
Lewis Hamilton started in pole position and finished second in the race.

On the end of lap eleven, Rosberg was the first front runner to go into the pitlane and Vettel followed suit just two laps later. A quicker stop by Rosberg saw Vettel emerge just in front of him, but the Ferrari stayed ahead and he passed Hamilton for second on lap 16. On the same lap, both Räikkönen and Hamilton made pit stops as well, re-establishing the order. One lap later, Fernando Alonso had a major accident as he ran into the back of Gutiérrez, being lifted into the air at 300 km/h (190 mph) and hitting the left-hand barrier before subsequently rolling over several times before coming to rest upside-down against the barrier at turn three, experiencing a peak force of 46G. While Alonso walked away with minor injuries, a safety car was deployed for a short time before the race direction decided to red flag the race due to the huge amounts of debris across the track from both Alonso's McLaren and damaged advertising boards, causing all cars to come back into pitlane.

While the cars waited for the restart, work on the cars was allowed and Hamilton's front wing was changed, while Rio Haryanto ended his race. As the race resumed behind the safety car, both Ferrari drivers were running on the super-soft tyre compound, with both Mercedes now equipped with mediums, which were set to last for the rest of the race. The running order at the restart was: Vettel, Rosberg, Räikkönen, Ricciardo, Verstappen, Sainz, Hamilton, Massa, Grosjean, Bottas. Grosjean in ninth was the only driver who had not made a pit stop before the red flag was shown, which allowed him to save one pit stop and change his tyres during the break.

Vettel led away at the restart, but his Ferrari teammate Räikkönen was forced to pull into the pit lane on lap 22 with fire coming from his airbox and subsequently retired, handing second place to Rosberg. Over the next couple of laps, Vettel was able to pull away from Rosberg on the softer tyre compound. Marcus Ericsson was handed a drive-through penalty for having his team work on his car less than 15 seconds before the restart. By lap 31, the gap between Vettel and Rosberg started to come down again, while Hamilton moved ahead of Sainz into fifth as the latter made a pit stop. Two laps later, Verstappen was in as well, but a slow pit stop lost him time. On lap 35, Rosberg took the lead as Vettel made a pit stop, who also lost time due to a mistake during his stop. He emerged back on track in fourth place. Hamilton now started to pull back time on the leaders, while debutant Palmer held off the two Toro Rosso drivers in a struggle for ninth place.

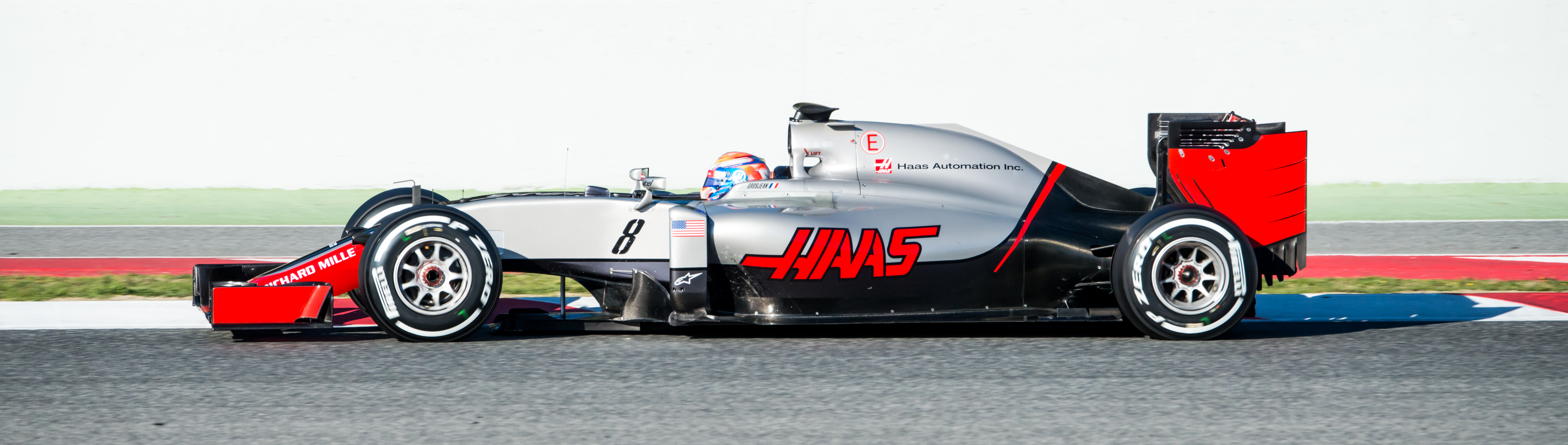
Romain Grosjean finished sixth, scoring points for Haas F1 on the team's début.

On lap 40, Ericsson started to slow on track and eventually retired. One lap later, Hamilton moved into second ahead of Ricciardo on the main straight. Lap 42 saw first Sainz and then Verstappen overtake Palmer's Renault, who fell back to eleventh. Another lap later, Ricciardo changed tyres and came out fifth behind Massa, taking fourth three laps later. At the front, Hamilton and Vettel slowly closed on Rosberg, with the gap between the two also coming down. Vettel came onto the back of Hamilton with five laps remaining, chasing him closely for several laps before making a mistake in the second to last corner of lap 55, losing his chances at second place.

As the race ended, Nico Rosberg took victory, thirty-one years after his father Keke Rosberg had won the 1985 Australian Grand Prix. Hamilton and Vettel rounded out the podium ahead of Ricciardo and Massa. With Romain Grosjean having finished in sixth, Haas F1 became the first new (and "from scratch") constructor since Toyota in 2002 to score points in its inaugural Grand Prix race entry. (Note: Brawn GP recorded a 1–2 finish at the 2009 Australian Grand Prix, but the team is generally considered not to have been a new team, but the rebranded successor of the Honda Racing F1 Team.) Behind Grosjean, Hülkenberg, Bottas, Sainz and Verstappen were the other point scorers. By finishing fourth, Daniel Ricciardo equalled the highest ever finish by an Australian driver at their home event, after Mark Webber did the same in 2012. (Note: Ricciardo initially finished second at the 2014 Australian Grand Prix, but was later disqualified for breaching fuel consumption rules.) It was Mercedes's fifth consecutive 1–2 finish, equalling a record set by Ferrari in 1952 and 2002 and by themselves in 2014.

=== Post-race ===
At the podium interviews, conducted by former Formula One driver Mark Webber, both Mercedes drivers expressed delight at their result. Hamilton in particular described his race as "great" and added that he "loved the fact that we had to come through from far behind." Sebastian Vettel meanwhile was satisfied with his start, but lamented the red flag situation and said that Ferrari had not expected Mercedes to opt for the harder tyre compound and go until the end of the race. He later added that he was confident that Ferrari had closed the gap to Mercedes and would be able to compete for the championship throughout the season. Nico Rosberg later revealed that the team had been close to retiring his car due to persisting brake issues caused by debris caught in the brake caliper. However, he was able to manage the brake temperatures to secure victory. Rosberg also apologised to his teammate for making contact and forcing him wide at the start.

Following an inquiry into the incident between Alonso and Gutiérrez, the stewards took no action against either driver, deeming it a "racing incident" with no driver particularly to blame. Fernando Alonso shared the stewards' opinion and was quick to express that he did not blame Gutiérrez. The accident was a talking point for days after the race, with former FIA president Max Mosley pointing out that Alonso's impact might have been fatal about twenty years earlier. He praised the measures taken in terms of driver security ever since the fatal accident of Ayrton Senna at the 1994 San Marino Grand Prix, saying that due to these efforts, one was now able to "expect the driver to walk away" from a violent crash.

Particular praise after the race went to both newcomers Haas and debutant Jolyon Palmer, who delivered what The Guardian described as an "impressive" drive. Palmer had been able to hold off attacks by both Toro Rosso drivers for several laps in the closing stages of the race. Toro Rosso's Max Verstappen was very unhappy with his team's strategy in the race handling the situation, repeatedly complaining and swearing over the team radio. He lost several seconds in a rushed pitstop, after which he lamented that he had wanted to pit before his teammate Sainz. While driving behind Sainz when both where trailing Palmer, he asked for team orders to allow him to pass his teammate, which were denied, leading him to describe his team's strategy as a "joke". Verstappen received criticism for his outbursts, with Sky Sports describing him as sounding "like a teenager – and a sulky one at that". He later apologised to his team for his outbursts.

The race also marked the first time the Driver of the Day award was introduced, as a move to increase fan engagement. The award originally went to Haryanto, who retired during the red flag period, but it was eventually given to Grosjean who helped the new Haas team to score their maiden points after the Formula One Management stated that, "In the interest of fairness, multiple votes identified as originating from the same source were not counted".

== Classification ==
=== Qualifying ===
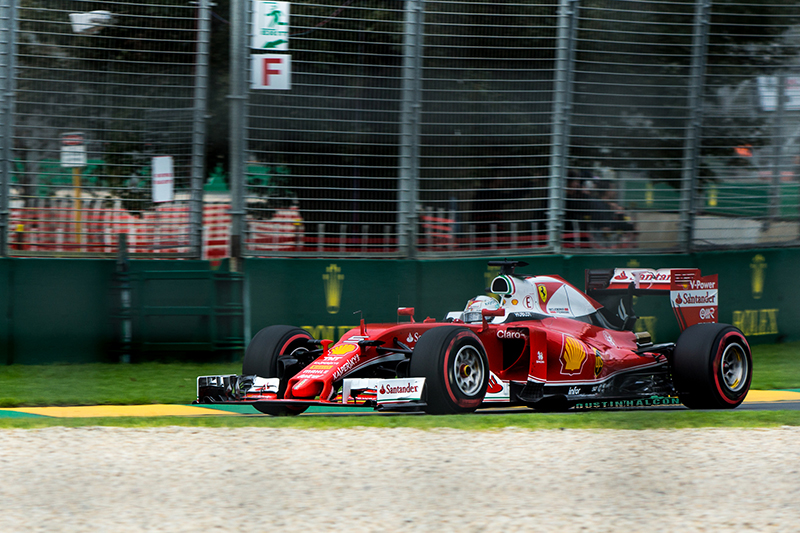
Sebastian Vettel finished third for Ferrari.

Pos.	Car no.	Driver	Constructor	Qualifying times			Final grid
Pos.	Car no.	Driver	Constructor	Q1	Q2	Q3	Final grid
1	44	(United Kingdom) Lewis Hamilton	Mercedes	1:25.351	1:24.605	1:23.837	1
2	6	(Germany) Nico Rosberg	Mercedes	1:26.934	1:24.796	1:24.197	2
3	5	(Germany) Sebastian Vettel	Ferrari	1:26.945	1:25.257	1:24.675	3
4	7	(Finland) Kimi Räikkönen	Ferrari	1:26.579	1:25.615	1:25.033	4
5	33	(Netherlands) Max Verstappen	Toro Rosso-Ferrari	1:26.934	1:25.615	1:25.434	5
6	19	(Brazil) Felipe Massa	Williams-Mercedes	1:25.918	1:25.644	1:25.458	6
7	55	(Spain) Carlos Sainz Jr.	Toro Rosso-Ferrari	1:27.057	1:25.384	1:25.582	7
8	3	(Australia) Daniel Ricciardo	Red Bull Racing-TAG Heuer	1:26.945	1:25.599	1:25.589	8
9	11	(Mexico) Sergio Pérez	Force India-Mercedes	1:26.607	1:25.753		9
10	27	(Germany) Nico Hülkenberg	Force India-Mercedes	1:26.550	1:25.865		10
11	77	(Finland) Valtteri Bottas	Williams-Mercedes	1:27.135	1:25.961		16^{1}
12	14	(Spain) Fernando Alonso	McLaren-Honda	1:26.537	1:26.125		11
13	22	(United Kingdom) Jenson Button	McLaren-Honda	1:26.740	1:26.304		12
14	30	(United Kingdom) Jolyon Palmer	Renault	1:27.241	1:27.601		13
15	20	(Denmark) Kevin Magnussen	Renault	1:27.297	1:27.742		14
16	9	(Sweden) Marcus Ericsson	Sauber-Ferrari	1:27.435			15
17	12	(Brazil) Felipe Nasr	Sauber-Ferrari	1:27.958			17
18	26	(Russia) Daniil Kvyat	Red Bull Racing-TAG Heuer	1:28.006			18
19	8	(France) Romain Grosjean	Haas-Ferrari	1:28.322			19
20	21	(Mexico) Esteban Gutiérrez	Haas-Ferrari	1:29.606			20
21	88	(Indonesia) Rio Haryanto	MRT-Mercedes	1:29.627			22^{2}
22	94	(Germany) Pascal Wehrlein	MRT-Mercedes	1:29.642			21
107% time: 1:31.325

Notes

- ^1 – Valtteri Bottas received a five-place grid penalty for unscheduled gearbox change.
- ^2 – Rio Haryanto received a three-place grid penalty after a pit lane collision with Romain Grosjean during the third practice session.

=== Race ===
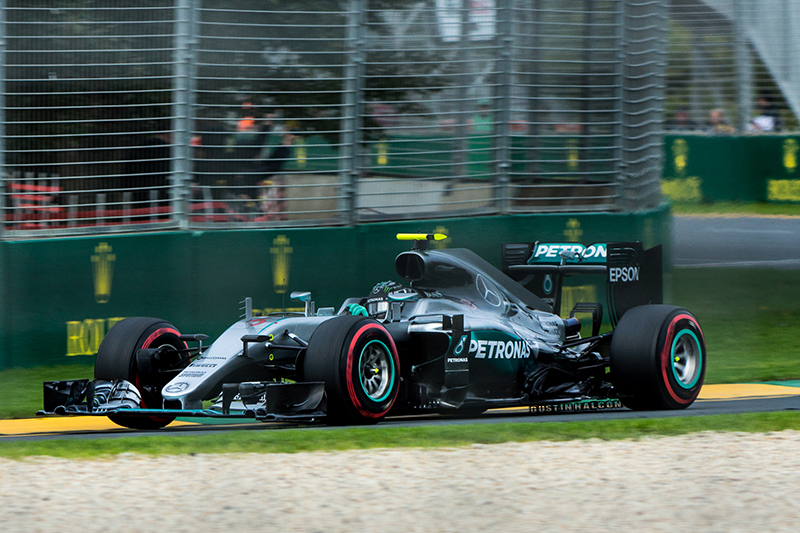
Nico Rosberg won the race for Mercedes.

Pos.	No.	Driver	Constructor	Laps	Time/Retired	Grid	Pts.
1	6	(Germany) Nico Rosberg	Mercedes	57	1:48:15.565	2	25
2	44	(United Kingdom) Lewis Hamilton	Mercedes	57	+8.060	1	18
3	5	(Germany) Sebastian Vettel	Ferrari	57	+9.643	3	15
4	3	(Australia) Daniel Ricciardo	Red Bull Racing-TAG Heuer	57	+24.330	8	12
5	19	(Brazil) Felipe Massa	Williams-Mercedes	57	+58.979	6	10
6	8	(France) Romain Grosjean	Haas-Ferrari	57	+1:12.081	19	8
7	27	(Germany) Nico Hülkenberg	Force India-Mercedes	57	+1:14.199	10	6
8	77	(Finland) Valtteri Bottas	Williams-Mercedes	57	+1:15.153	16	4
9	55	(Spain) Carlos Sainz Jr.	Toro Rosso-Ferrari	57	+1:15.680	7	2
10	33	(Netherlands) Max Verstappen	Toro Rosso-Ferrari	57	+1:16.833	5	1
11	30	(United Kingdom) Jolyon Palmer	Renault	57	+1:23.399	13	
12	20	(Denmark) Kevin Magnussen	Renault	57	+1:25.606	14	
13	11	(Mexico) Sergio Pérez	Force India-Mercedes	57	+1:31.699	9	
14	22	(United Kingdom) Jenson Button	McLaren-Honda	56	+1 Lap	12	
15	12	(Brazil) Felipe Nasr	Sauber-Ferrari	56	+1 Lap	17	
16	94	(Germany) Pascal Wehrlein	MRT-Mercedes	56	+1 Lap	21	
Ret	9	(Sweden) Marcus Ericsson	Sauber-Ferrari	38	Transmission	15	
Ret	7	(Finland) Kimi Räikkönen	Ferrari	21	Turbo	4	
Ret	88	(Indonesia) Rio Haryanto	MRT-Mercedes	17	Driveshaft	22	
Ret	21	(Mexico) Esteban Gutiérrez	Haas-Ferrari	16	Collision	20	
Ret	14	(Spain) Fernando Alonso	McLaren-Honda	16	Collision	11	
DNS	26	(Russia) Daniil Kvyat	Red Bull Racing-TAG Heuer	0	Electrical	—^{1}	

Notes

- ^1 – Daniil Kvyat's car failed during the formation lap. His place on the starting grid was left vacant.

== Championship standings after the race ==
Drivers' Championship standings

Pos.	Driver	Points
1	(Germany) Nico Rosberg	25
2	(United Kingdom) Lewis Hamilton	18
3	(Germany) Sebastian Vettel	15
4	(Australia) Daniel Ricciardo	12
5	(Brazil) Felipe Massa	10

Constructors' Championship standings

Pos.	Constructor	Points
1	(Germany) Mercedes	43
2	(Italy) Ferrari	15
3	(United Kingdom) Williams-Mercedes	14
4	(Austria) Red Bull Racing-TAG Heuer	12
5	(United States) Haas-Ferrari	8

- Note: Only the top five positions are included for both sets of standings.

== See also ==
- 2016 Coates Hire V8 Supercars Challenge

Previous race: 2015 Abu Dhabi Grand Prix	FIA Formula One World Championship; 2016 season	Next race: 2016 Bahrain Grand Prix
Previous race: 2015 Australian Grand Prix	Australian Grand Prix	Next race: 2017 Australian Grand Prix
