= 2016 European Grand Prix =

Formula One motor race 2016 at Baku, Azerbaijan

Race 8 of 21 in the 2016 Formula One World Championship
← Previous race	Next race →
- Layout of the Baku City Circuit

Race details
- Date: 19 June 2016
- Official name: Formula 1 Rolex Grand Prix of Europe
- Location: Baku City Circuit; Baku, Azerbaijan
- Course: Temporary street circuit
- Course length: 6.003 km (3.730 miles)
- Distance: 51 laps, 306.049 km (190.170 miles)
- Weather: Partly cloudy 30–33 °C (86–91 °F) air temperature 39–45 °C (102–113 °F) track temperature 2.5 m/s (8.2 ft/s) wind from the southeast
- Attendance: 30,000 (Weekend)

Pole position
Driver	(Germany) Nico Rosberg	Mercedes
- Time: 1:42.758

Fastest lap
Driver	(Germany) Nico Rosberg	Mercedes
- Time: 1:46.485 on lap 48

Podium
First	(Germany) Nico Rosberg	Mercedes
Second	(Germany) Sebastian Vettel	Ferrari
Third	(Mexico) Sergio Pérez	Force India-Mercedes

The 2016 European Grand Prix (formally known as the 2016 Formula 1 Grand Prix of Europe) was a Formula One motor race that was held on 19 June 2016 at the Baku City Circuit in Baku, Azerbaijan. The race was the eighth round of the 2016 season, and marked the twenty-third running of the European Grand Prix as a round of the Formula One World Championship and, as of 2026, the last time the title European Grand Prix was used for a Formula One race. It was the only time that the race was held at the circuit and the first time that a Grand Prix had been held in Azerbaijan.

Nico Rosberg entered the round holding a nine-point lead in the World Drivers' Championship ahead of teammate Lewis Hamilton. Their team, Mercedes, came in leading Ferrari by seventy-six points in the World Constructors' Championship. Rosberg went on to win the race—his first race win since the Russian Grand Prix—and extended his championship lead to twenty-four points. The result also marked Rosberg's second career grand slam. Sebastian Vettel finished second, with Force India driver Sergio Pérez completing the podium. In the Constructors' Championship, Mercedes extended their lead over Ferrari to eighty-one points.

Valtteri Bottas recorded the highest ever clocked speed in an official Formula One session, at 378 km/h (235 mph) during qualifying, breaking the previous record of 369.6 km/h (229.7 mph), set by Antônio Pizzonia at Monza during the 2004 Italian Grand Prix.

== Report ==
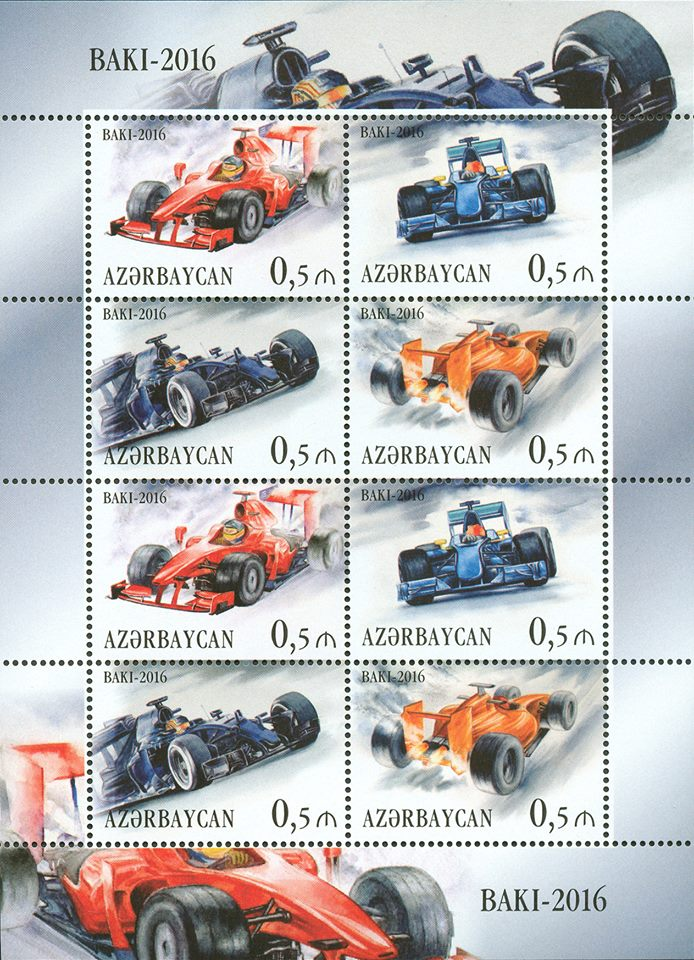
A series of postage stamps commissioned by Azermarka to celebrate the race

=== Background ===
Going into the weekend, Nico Rosberg led the Drivers' Championship with 116 points, nine ahead of teammate Lewis Hamilton. Sebastian Vettel followed in third with 78 points, six clear of Daniel Ricciardo, followed by Kimi Räikkönen with 69. In the Constructors' standings, Mercedes led the field with 223 points, ahead of Ferrari with 147. Third was Red Bull Racing with 130 points, with Williams a further 49 points behind.

==== Preparations ====
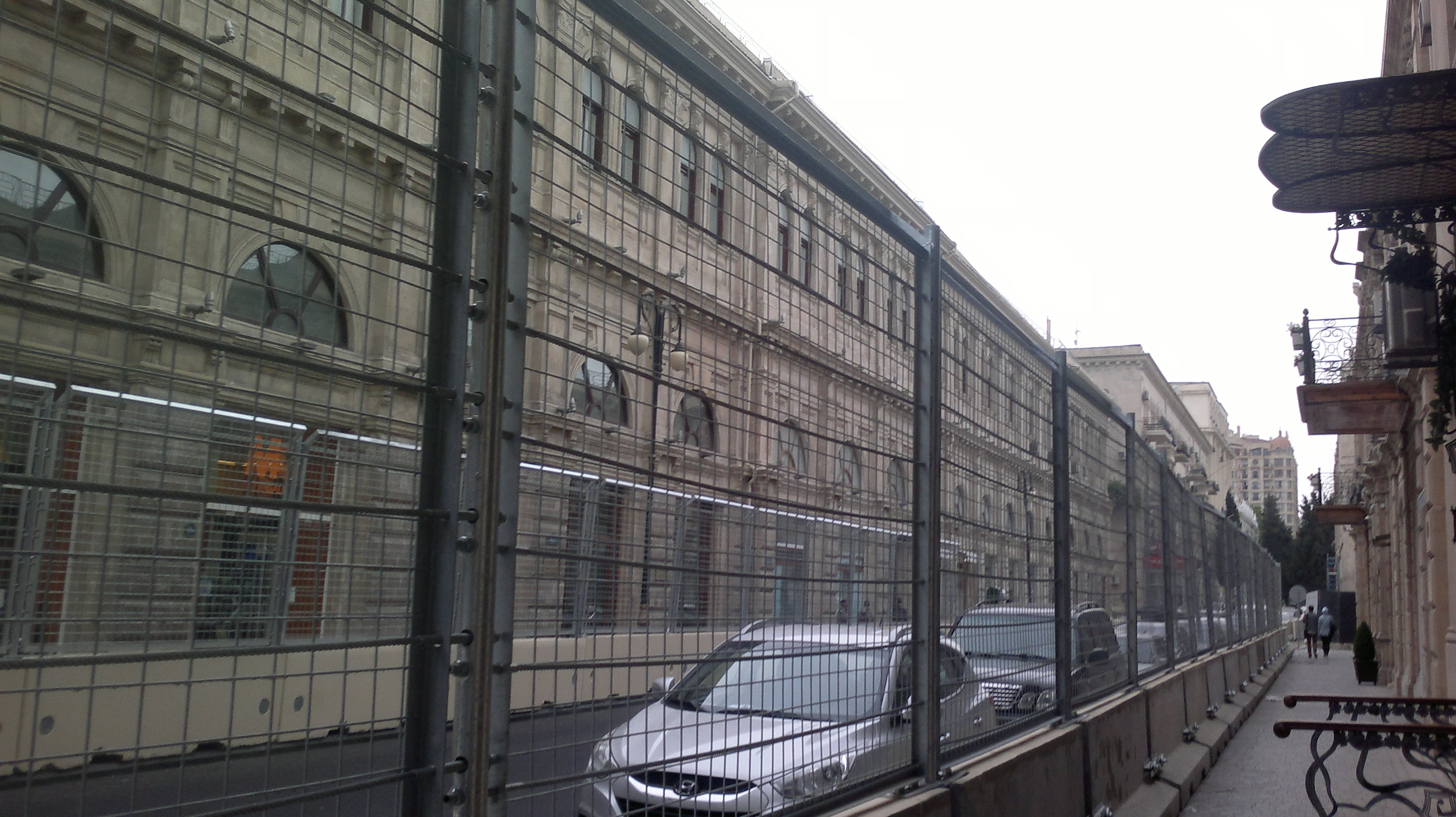
Barriers erected in the streets of Baku for the race

Plans to hold a Formula One race in Azerbaijan were first announced by Bernie Ecclestone – the sport's commercial rights holder – in May 2014, when he declared that the race in Baku would replace the Korean Grand Prix for the 2015 season. The government of Azerbaijan confirmed the plans in July of the same year, declaring that the race would be held under the title Grand Prix of Europe. At the same time, the organisers announced that the debut in Baku would be delayed until 2016. Hermann Tilke, the designer of the street circuit, released first pictures of the planned venue in October 2014. Even though the race faced criticism by human rights activists, citing the government's attitude towards civil liberties, Ecclestone gave the go-ahead for the race in April 2015. The Grand Prix in Baku was the second to be held in the former Soviet Union, following the Russian Grand Prix at Sochi, first held in 2014.

The circuit passed its final inspection in May 2016 with FIA Race Director Charlie Whiting declaring his satisfaction that the circuit would be ready in time for the race. The circuit attracted some criticism from drivers who highlighted a lack of run-off in some corners and the tight pit entry positioned at one of the fastest points on the circuit. Following problems with loose kerbs in free practice, changes were made in turns 6 and 12, where the kerbs were replaced by painted markings on the track. Further revisions were made to the pit entry ahead of qualifying, extending the white line denoting the entry lane to allow drivers more time to react to cars entering the pit.

==== Tyres ====
After providing teams with the ultrasoft compound for the Monaco and Canadian Grands Prix, tyre supplier Pirelli made the supersoft, soft and medium compounds available for the race despite the ultrasoft compound being specifically designed for street circuits. Pirelli explained the decision not to provide the ultrasoft tyres as being a result of a lack of available performance data on the circuit, while most teams opted for a full complement of soft and supersoft tyres and taking only the minimum number of medium compound tyres dictated by the rules. In preparing for the race, Pirelli acknowledged concerns about the circuit's high speed straights and direction changes causing "standing waves" over longer runs, a phenomenon whereby the energy passing through the wheel is strong enough to shift the build of the tyre, compromising its rigidity and increasing the likelihood of tyre failures. Further concerns were raised about the impact of the temporary surface used to protect the cobblestones through the Old City section on the tyres, amid fears that predicted high temperatures throughout the weekend would cause this surface to break up. Following the first free practice session, it was found that the metal bolts used to anchor segments of kerbing to the roadway had started working loose and had been cutting into the rubber of the tyres, necessitating minor modifications to the circuit in order to correct the issue.

==== Drag reduction system ====
The race saw the use of two drag reduction system (DRS) zones, with the first positioned along the main straight and the second located on the parallel back straight between turns 2 and 3.

==== Support events ====
The circuit also hosted the third round of the 2016 GP2 Series championship as a supporting event.

=== Controversies ===
Following the initial announcement of its revival, the race was subject to criticism in light of Azerbaijan's human rights record as the race was established with the financial support of the Azerbaijani government. On 7 June 2016, the organisation Sport for Rights called for Bernie Ecclestone to speak out about the human rights situation in the country, having written an open letter to him to which Ecclestone had not replied. Sport for Rights made it clear that they did not call for a cancellation of the race, but instead urged the sport to use the race to promote these issues in public. Ecclestone replied a week later, saying that Formula One had "a clear conscience" on human rights and added: "I tell you what we ought to do. As far as we are concerned, not have any races where there is corruption in the country. Can you tell me where we are going to be racing?"

With the race scheduled for 19 June, the event conflicted with the conclusion of the 2016 24 Hours of Le Mans. Force India driver Nico Hülkenberg, who won the 2015 race with Porsche would not be able to return and defend his title, leading to accusations that Formula One Management had deliberately scheduled the race to conflict with Le Mans and prevent Formula One drivers from participating. In May 2016, the Azerbaijan government decided to abandon the use of daylight saving time, prompting event organisers to change the start time of the race. The revised start time negated the clash between the start of the Grand Prix and the race in Le Mans.

=== Free practice ===
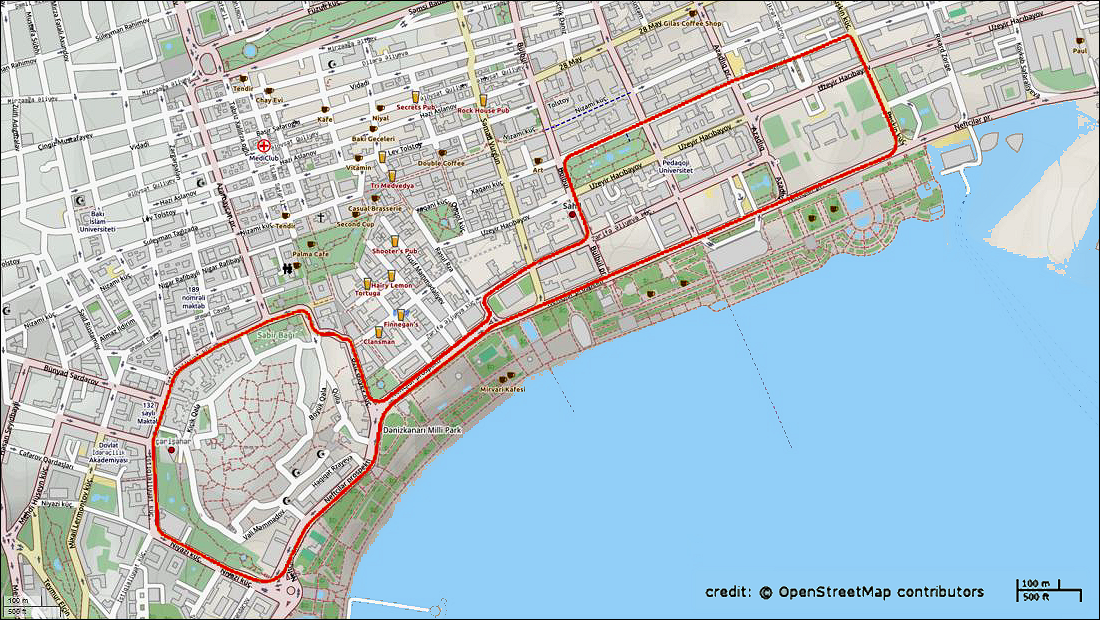
Layout of the Baku City Circuit around the old city part (left) and modern Baku area (right)

Per the regulations for the 2016 season, two 90-minute practice sessions were held on Friday and another 60-minute session was held before qualifying on Saturday. In the first ever session on the new track on Friday morning, Lewis Hamilton set the fastest time at 1:46.435. He was followed by his Mercedes teammate Rosberg almost four-tenths of a second back, with Valtteri Bottas third for Williams, also within one second of Hamilton. Fernando Alonso was an encouraging fourth for McLaren. Both Bottas and Alonso set their fastest times on the soft rather than the supersoft tyre compound used by the Mercedes drivers. Several drivers got caught out on the new track, the first being Esteban Gutiérrez, who was forced into the run-off area at turn 15. Hamilton also had an incident, touching the barrier at turn 3 and flat-spotting his tyres later on the lap. The biggest incident occurred when Daniel Ricciardo crashed his Red Bull RB12 at the exit of turn 15, losing one of his rear wheels and causing an eleven-minute red flag period.

Hamilton was again fastest in the second session on Friday afternoon, edging out Rosberg by almost seven-tenths of a second. Rosberg's running was limited as he coasted to a halt on track with twenty minutes of the session left to go due to losing drive. Ferrari was not competitive in eighth and thirteenth place for Vettel and Räikkönen respectively, with both cars suffering from problems with their energy recovery unit. The top five cars were powered by Mercedes, as Sergio Pérez led the charge behind Mercedes in third, ahead of Bottas and Nico Hülkenberg. Fernando Alonso managed eleventh place, but had to spend considerable time in the garage while his team worked on his car. Marcus Ericsson also had limited track time as a problem with his exhaust pipe forced him to miss the early part of the session. With loose kerbs detected during the GP2 qualifying session, drivers were instructed to stay clear of the kerbs at turn 6. Once more, many drivers had minor incidents on track, with some having to take to the run-off area at turn 3, while Gutiérrez touched the barrier at turn 8. Carlos Sainz Jr. spun at the first corner, but nevertheless finished the session in sixth, the fastest runner without a Mercedes power unit.

In the third session on Saturday morning, Hamilton topped the timesheets once again, setting a time of 1:44.352, a quarter of a second clear of teammate Rosberg. Hülkenberg was third for Force India ahead of Ricciardo and Vettel. The session saw several incidents: Bottas damaged the floor of his car when he ran over a drain cover on his installation lap and was forced to miss the rest of the session; Felipe Massa made contact with the wall, but was later able to rejoin practice; Räikkönen's track time was limited as well due to a loss of power; and a red flag period occurred right after the chequered flag fell as Pérez crashed at turn 15.

=== Qualifying ===
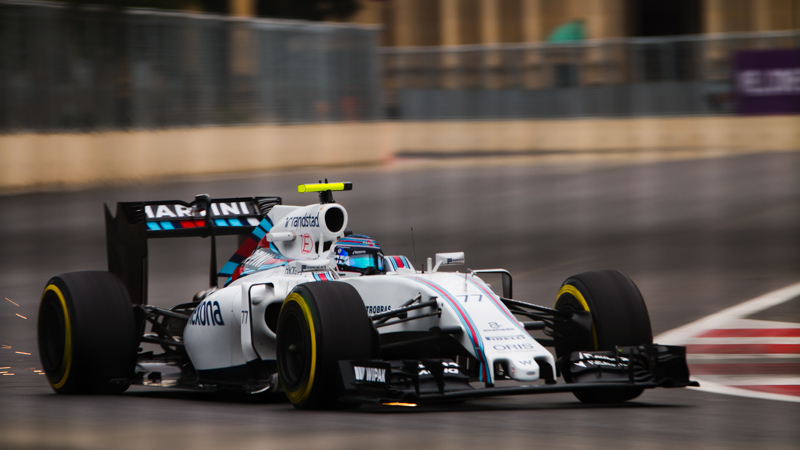
In qualifying, Valtteri Bottas reached the highest speed ever recorded for a Formula One car, at 378 km/h (235 mph).

The first period of qualifying (Q1) ran for eighteen minutes and set positions seventeen to twenty-two on the grid. Nico Rosberg was the fastest at the end of the session, which saw MRT drivers Rio Haryanto and Pascal Wehrlein eliminated in seventeenth and eighteenth place, their best qualifying performance of the season. Jenson Button qualified nineteenth, after running wide at turn 15 on his first flying lap and aborting his second after encountering traffic. Marcus Ericsson finished twentieth overall, ahead of the Renaults of Kevin Magnussen and Jolyon Palmer, who struggled with a lack of power on the circuit's long straights.

The second qualifying period was fifteen minutes in length, and was used to set positions eleven through to sixteen. It was once again topped by Nico Rosberg, who was the first person to set a time under 1:43.000 all weekend. Meanwhile, Lewis Hamilton locked his brakes on the approach to turn 7, damaging his race tyres. Hamilton narrowly avoided elimination, setting a time good enough to proceed on his last attempt. Romain Grosjean was eliminated in eleventh, having overcome issues with his brake balance. Nico Hülkenberg was a surprise elimination in twelfth, having run consistently at the front of the field throughout the weekend. His elimination was attributed to a miscommunication between himself and his engineer over the amount of fuel he had on board. Carlos Sainz Jr. and Fernando Alonso finished thirteenth and fourteenth to fill the seventh row of the grid, ahead of Gutiérrez.

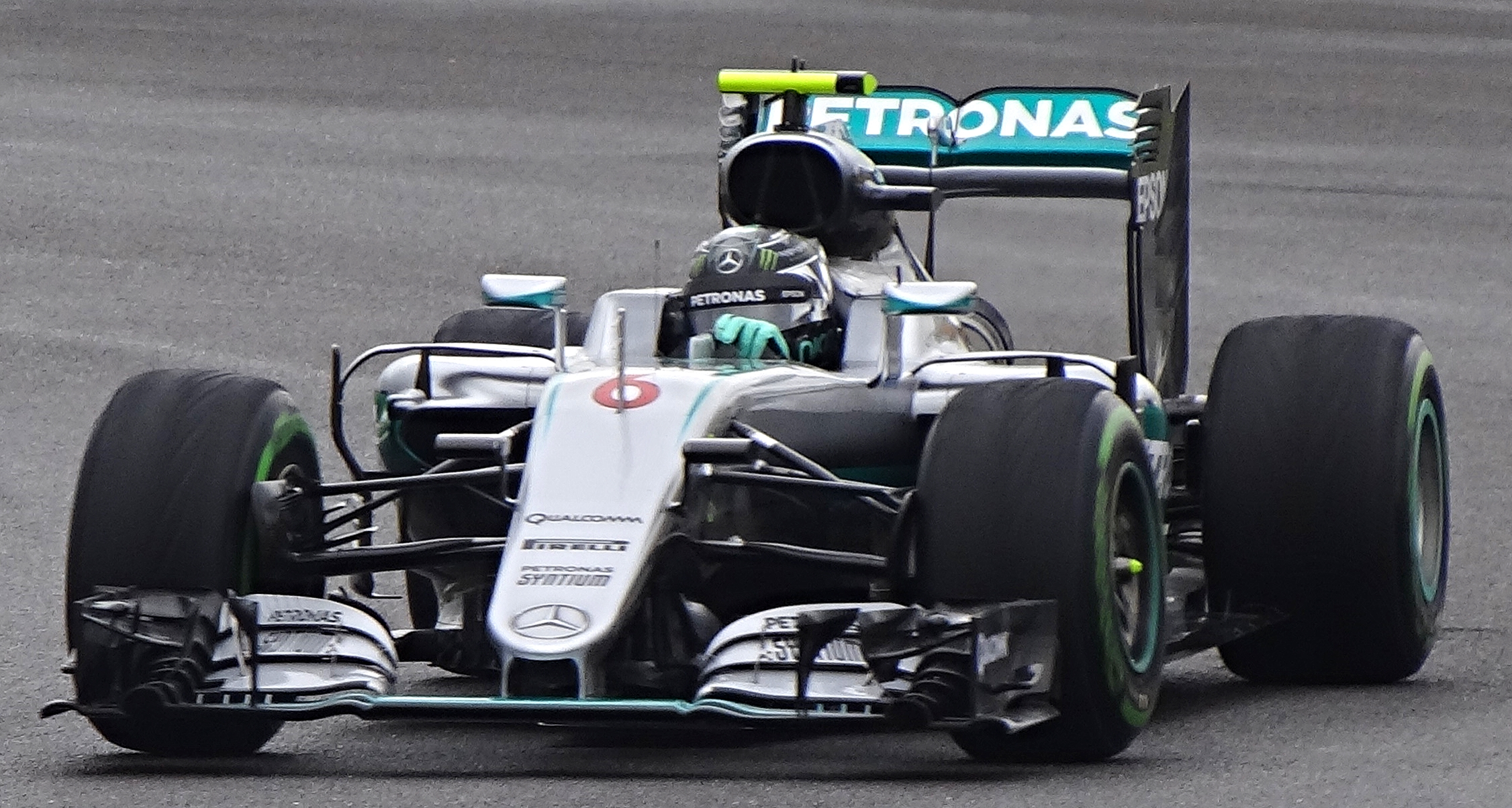
Nico Rosberg (pictured at the British Grand Prix) started from pole position and went on to win the race for Mercedes.

The third and final session was twelve minutes long. Sergio Pérez set the early pace before Hamilton made a mistake, also impeding Rosberg's first flying lap. Rosberg surpassed Pérez's lap time to claim provisional pole while Hamilton crashed out, clipping the barrier on the inside of turn 10 and breaking his front suspension. The session was immediately red-flagged while Hamilton's car was cleared away, and resumed with just two minutes remaining. This left eight drivers – with the exception of the crashed Hamilton and Rosberg, who elected not to go out – to fight for positions on the grid. Daniel Ricciardo led the column of cars out and set a lap time good enough for third place; Sebastian Vettel matched his lap time to the thousandth of a second, and was classified fourth, as Ricciardo had set his lap time first. Kimi Räikkönen finished fifth, ahead of Felipe Massa. Daniil Kvyat out-qualified teammate Sainz in seventh, the first time that he had out-qualified a teammate in 2016. Valtteri Bottas overcame the damage to his car and lack of running during free practice to finish eighth alongside Verstappen, the two having been involved in a series of on-track altercations throughout qualifying. Hamilton finished tenth, with his time of over two minutes having been recorded when he took to the escape road on his first flying lap. During qualifying, Bottas reached the highest ever recorded speed in an official Formula One session, at 378 km/h (235 mph), exceeding the previous record of 369.6 km/h (229.7 mph) set by Antônio Pizzonia at the 2004 Italian Grand Prix.

=== Post-qualifying ===
Sergio Pérez was demoted to seventh with the application of a gearbox penalty, following a change made necessary after he hit the barrier in turn 15 during the last practice session. This promoted Ricciardo, Vettel, Räikkönen, Massa, and Kvyat up the grid in the process. Sainz and Magnussen were also demoted, with Magnussen having to start from the pit lane. Lewis Hamilton was given permission to change his front left tyre ahead of the race. Under the regulations, a driver who qualifies in the top ten must start the race on the set of tyres they used to record their best time in the second part of qualifying. However, Hamilton's front left tyre, which belonged to the set of tyres that he subsequently used to set his fastest time during his next flying lap, was deemed to be too damaged following his lock-up going into turn seven, necessitating its change on safety grounds.

=== Race ===
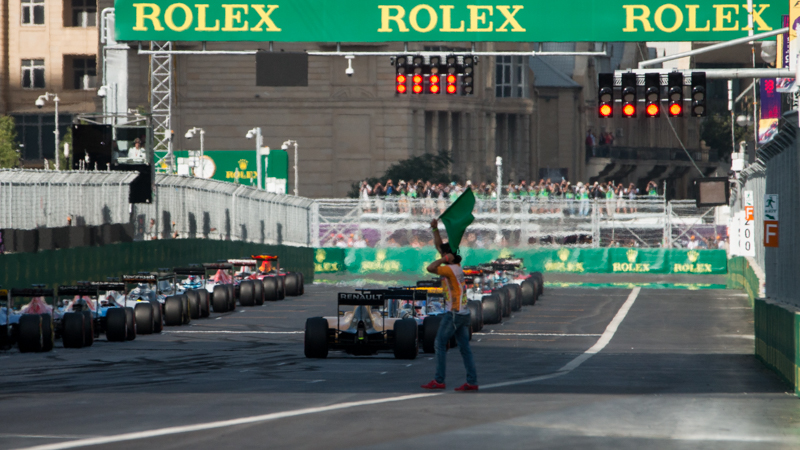
The start of the race

At the start of the race, Rosberg retained his lead ahead of Ricciardo, followed by Vettel and Räikkönen. Sergio Pérez gained two places and was fifth, while Esteban Gutiérrez damaged his front wing when he made contact with the back of Nico Hülkenberg's car. Hamilton remained tenth until he overtook Kvyat for ninth place on lap four. One lap later, both Bottas and Hamilton seized an opportunity to overtake Max Verstappen, as he ran wide into turn two. As a reaction, Red Bull decided to change tyres on Verstappen's car on the following lap. Another lap later, Ricciardo followed suit. At Red Bull's sister team Toro Rosso, Daniil Kvyat retired on lap eight. On lap ten, Hamilton overtook Bottas for fourth place, but was more than twenty seconds behind teammate Rosberg. He went into the pit lane for a tyre change on lap 15. Force India reacted two laps later and brought Pérez in and he emerged back from the pit lane just ahead of Hamilton. Meanwhile, the order at the front was Rosberg, Vettel, Bottas, Ricciardo and Räikkönen. On lap 18, Räikkönen took fourth place by overtaking Ricciardo on the start/finish straight. Pérez moved ahead of Massa into seventh on lap 20, and Hamilton followed through one lap later, while Bottas pitted and returned to the track in ninth place.

Second placed Sebastian Vettel came into the pit lane at the end of lap 21 and dropped to third behind Ricciardo. Race leader Rosberg made his stop one lap later, retaining the lead. On lap 23, both Pérez and Hamilton passed Ricciardo, who came in for his second tyre change at the end of the lap and dropped back to 13th place. Aided by pit stops in front of him and a timely overtake on Carlos Sainz Jr. on lap 27, he moved back into ninth shortly thereafter. Two laps later, Räikkönen let teammate Vettel pass him for second place, albeit 18 seconds down on race leader Rosberg. Starting by lap 32, Hamilton suffered from problems with his car, being stuck in a wrong engine mode. Due to the regulations stating that drivers had to drive the vehicles "unaided", the team was not allowed to help him. Another lap later, the race ended for Sainz due to a suspension problem. On lap 42, Pascal Wehrlein retired as well with brake failure. By lap 44, Hamilton had sorted out his issues and set the fastest lap of the race while in fifth place. In front of him the order was Rosberg, Vettel, Räikkönen and Pérez. One lap later, Fernando Alonso retired in the pit lane due to gearbox issues, after having been passed by multiple drivers in the preceding laps.

As Rosberg was comfortably in the lead, still 18 seconds ahead of Vettel, Verstappen took ninth place from Massa going into turn one on lap 46. Red Bull teammate Ricciardo also gained a place, at Hülkenberg's expense, at the same spot three laps later. With Räikkönen facing a five-second time penalty for crossing the pit entry line, Pérez behind him would not have to pass him to achieve third place as long as he stayed within five seconds of him. Pérez nevertheless made the move on the final lap to finish in the final podium position. Meanwhile, Nico Rosberg crossed the line to win the Grand Prix, more than 16 seconds ahead of Sebastian Vettel.

=== Post-race ===
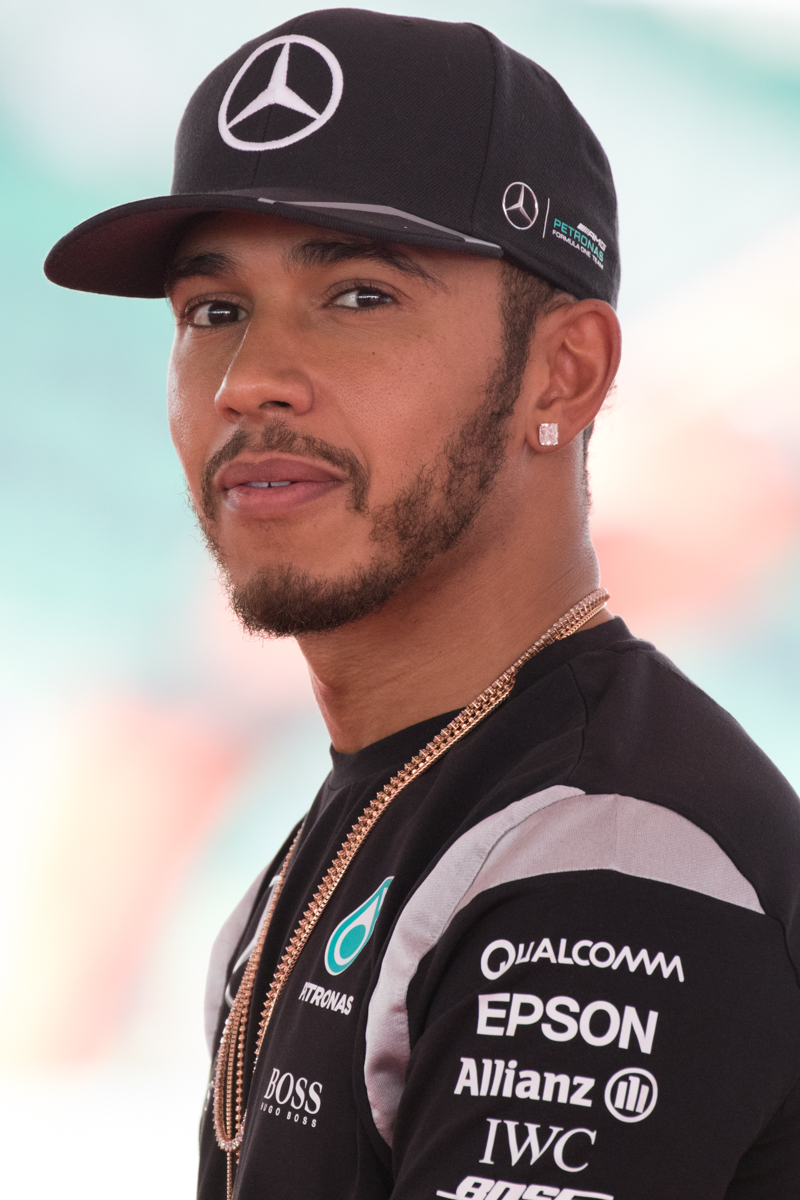
Lewis Hamilton (pictured at the Malaysian Grand Prix) criticised team radio rules after being unable to fix a problem on his car for twelve laps.

At the podium interview, conducted by former team owner Eddie Jordan, Rosberg hailed an "amazing weekend" for himself, saying that he was "ecstatic" about the victory, but refused to answer questions concerning the outcome of the World Championship. Second-placed Vettel praised the track and his team's effort in preparing the car after difficulties in Friday's free practice. Sergio Pérez emphasised his recovery after his gearbox penalty, which put him back five places on the starting grid and the satisfaction of overtaking Räikkönen on the last lap of the race. During the following press conference, Vettel expressed surprise at the fact that no safety car period had emerged over the course of the race.

Fifth-placed Hamilton, who had been stuck in a wrong engine mode for twelve laps and was at first unable to resolve the issue without the help of his team, attacked the revised radio rules, stating: "The rule needs to be looked at again because it is a technical issue." He stressed that the ban made the sport more dangerous. Several drivers, such as Fernando Alonso and Sebastian Vettel, joined him in his criticism. It transpired after the race that Rosberg had had the same problem, a couple of laps after it occurred on Hamilton's car, but was able to solve it faster than his teammate.

Following his pit lane entry violation during the race, which handed him a five-second time penalty, Kimi Räikkönen was furthermore given two penalty points to his licence, bringing him to five overall.

As a result of the race, Rosberg extended his lead in the Drivers' Championship to 24 points over Hamilton, with Vettel a further 21 points behind in third. In the Constructors' standings, Mercedes retained their lead with 258 points, followed by Ferrari on 177 and Red Bull with 140 points.

== Classification ==
=== Qualifying ===
Pos.	Car no.	Driver	Constructor	Qualifying times			Final grid
Pos.	Car no.	Driver	Constructor	Q1	Q2	Q3	Final grid
1	6	(Germany) Nico Rosberg	Mercedes	1:43.685	1:42.520	1:42.758	1
2	11	(Mexico) Sergio Pérez	Force India-Mercedes	1:44.462	1:43.939	1:43.515	7^{1}
3	3	(Australia) Daniel Ricciardo	Red Bull Racing-TAG Heuer	1:44.570	1:44.141	1:43.966^{2}	2
4	5	(Germany) Sebastian Vettel	Ferrari	1:45.062	1:44.461	1:43.966^{2}	3
5	7	(Finland) Kimi Räikkönen	Ferrari	1:44.936	1:44.533	1:44.269	4
6	19	(Brazil) Felipe Massa	Williams-Mercedes	1:45.494	1:44.696	1:44.483	5
7	26	(Russia) Daniil Kvyat	Toro Rosso-Ferrari	1:44.694	1:44.687	1:44.717	6
8	77	(Finland) Valtteri Bottas	Williams-Mercedes	1:44.706	1:44.477	1:45.246	8
9	33	(Netherlands) Max Verstappen	Red Bull Racing-TAG Heuer	1:44.939	1:44.387	1:45.570	9
10	44	(United Kingdom) Lewis Hamilton	Mercedes	1:44.259	1:43.526	2:01.954	10
11	8	(France) Romain Grosjean	Haas-Ferrari	1:45.507	1:44.755	N/A	11
12	27	(Germany) Nico Hülkenberg	Force India-Mercedes	1:44.860	1:44.824	N/A	12
13	55	(Spain) Carlos Sainz Jr.	Toro Rosso-Ferrari	1:44.827	1:45.000	N/A	18^{1}
14	14	(Spain) Fernando Alonso	McLaren-Honda	1:45.525	1:45.270	N/A	13
15	21	(Mexico) Esteban Gutiérrez	Haas-Ferrari	1:45.300	1:45.349	N/A	14
16	12	(Brazil) Felipe Nasr	Sauber-Ferrari	1:45.549	1:46.048	N/A	15
17	88	(Indonesia) Rio Haryanto	MRT-Mercedes	1:45.665	N/A	N/A	16
18	94	(Germany) Pascal Wehrlein	MRT-Mercedes	1:45.750	N/A	N/A	17
19	22	(United Kingdom) Jenson Button	McLaren-Honda	1:45.804	N/A	N/A	19
20	9	(Sweden) Marcus Ericsson	Sauber-Ferrari	1:46.231	N/A	N/A	20
21	20	(Denmark) Kevin Magnussen	Renault	1:46.348	N/A	N/A	PL^{1}^{,}^{3}
22	30	(United Kingdom) Jolyon Palmer	Renault	1:46.394	N/A	N/A	21
107% time: 1:50.942

Notes

- ^1 – Sergio Pérez, Carlos Sainz Jr., and Kevin Magnussen received five-place grid penalties for unscheduled gearbox changes.
- ^2 – Daniel Ricciardo and Sebastian Vettel set identical lap times in Q3. As Ricciardo was the first to set his time, he was considered to have qualified ahead of Vettel.
- ^3 – Kevin Magnussen was required to start from the pit lane as his car was modified under parc fermé conditions.

=== Race ===
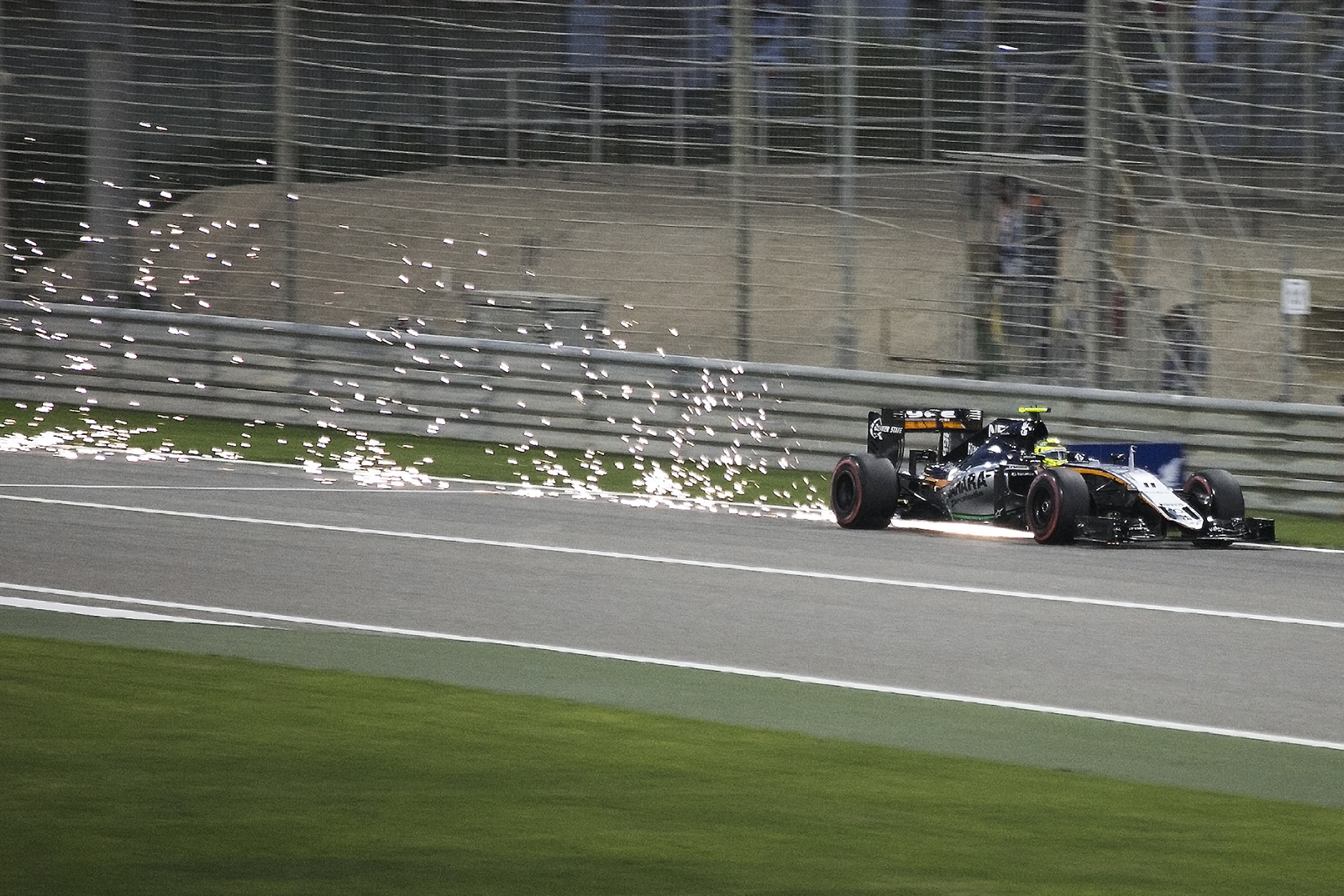
Sergio Pérez (pictured at the Bahrain Grand Prix) finished third after a penalty relegated him to seventh on the grid.

Pos.	No.	Driver	Constructor	Laps	Time/Retired	Grid	Points
1	6	(Germany) Nico Rosberg	Mercedes	51	1:32:52.366	1	25
2	5	(Germany) Sebastian Vettel	Ferrari	51	+16.696	3	18
3	11	(Mexico) Sergio Pérez	Force India-Mercedes	51	+25.241	7	15
4	7	(Finland) Kimi Räikkönen	Ferrari	51	+33.102^{1}	4	12
5	44	(United Kingdom) Lewis Hamilton	Mercedes	51	+56.335	10	10
6	77	(Finland) Valtteri Bottas	Williams-Mercedes	51	+1:00.886	8	8
7	3	(Australia) Daniel Ricciardo	Red Bull Racing-TAG Heuer	51	+1:09.229	2	6
8	33	(Netherlands) Max Verstappen	Red Bull Racing-TAG Heuer	51	+1:10.696	9	4
9	27	(Germany) Nico Hülkenberg	Force India-Mercedes	51	+1:17.708	12	2
10	19	(Brazil) Felipe Massa	Williams-Mercedes	51	+1:25.375	5	1
11	22	(United Kingdom) Jenson Button	McLaren-Honda	51	+1:44.817	19	
12	12	(Brazil) Felipe Nasr	Sauber-Ferrari	50	+1 Lap	15	
13	8	(France) Romain Grosjean	Haas-Ferrari	50	+1 Lap	11	
14	20	(Denmark) Kevin Magnussen	Renault	50	+1 Lap	PL	
15	30	(United Kingdom) Jolyon Palmer	Renault	50	+1 Lap	21	
16	21	(Mexico) Esteban Gutiérrez	Haas-Ferrari	50	+1 Lap	14	
17	9	(Sweden) Marcus Ericsson	Sauber-Ferrari	50	+1 Lap	20	
18	88	(Indonesia) Rio Haryanto	MRT-Mercedes	49	+2 Laps	16	
Ret	14	(Spain) Fernando Alonso	McLaren-Honda	42	Gearbox	13	
Ret	94	(Germany) Pascal Wehrlein	MRT-Mercedes	39	Brakes	17	
Ret	55	(Spain) Carlos Sainz Jr.	Toro Rosso-Ferrari	31	Suspension	18	
Ret	26	(Russia) Daniil Kvyat	Toro Rosso-Ferrari	6	Suspension	6	

Notes

- ^1 – Kimi Räikkönen had five seconds added to his race time for crossing the pit entry line. His finishing position was left unchanged.

== Championship standings after the race ==
Drivers' Championship standings

	Pos.	Driver	Points
	1	(Germany) Nico Rosberg	141
	2	(United Kingdom) Lewis Hamilton	117
	3	(Germany) Sebastian Vettel	96
1	4	(Finland) Kimi Räikkönen	81
1	5	(Australia) Daniel Ricciardo	78

Constructors' Championship standings

Pos.	Constructor	Points
1	(Germany) Mercedes	258
2	(Italy) Ferrari	177
3	(Austria) Red Bull Racing-TAG Heuer	140
4	(United Kingdom) Williams-Mercedes	90
5	Force India-Mercedes	59

- Note: Only the top five positions are included for both sets of standings.

== See also ==
- 2016 Baku GP2 Series round

Previous race: 2016 Canadian Grand Prix	FIA Formula One World Championship; 2016 season	Next race: 2016 Austrian Grand Prix
Previous race: 2012 European Grand Prix at Valencia, Spain	European Grand Prix	Next race: N/A; Next race at the Baku City Circuit: 2017 Azerbaijan Grand Prix
