= 2016 Canadian Grand Prix =

Race 7 of 21 in the 2016 Formula One World Championship
← Previous race	Next race →
- Layout of the Circuit Gilles Villeneuve

Race details
- Date: 12 June 2016
- Official name: Formula 1 Grand Prix du Canada 2016
- Location: Circuit Gilles Villeneuve; Montreal, Quebec, Canada
- Course: Street circuit
- Course length: 4.361 km (2.710 miles)
- Distance: 70 laps, 305.270 km (189.686 miles)
- Weather: Cloudy; 12 °C (54 °F) air temperature 21–23 °C (70–73 °F) track temperature 2.5 m/s (8.2 ft/s) wind from the southeast
- Attendance: 300,000 (Weekend)

Pole position
Driver	(United Kingdom) Lewis Hamilton	Mercedes
- Time: 1:12.812

Fastest lap
Driver	(Germany) Nico Rosberg	Mercedes
- Time: 1:15.599 on lap 60

Podium
First	(United Kingdom) Lewis Hamilton	Mercedes
Second	(Germany) Sebastian Vettel	Ferrari
Third	(Finland) Valtteri Bottas	Williams-Mercedes

The 2016 Canadian Grand Prix (formally known as the Formula 1 Grand Prix du Canada 2016) was a Formula One motor race that took place on 12 June 2016 at the Circuit Gilles Villeneuve in Montreal, Quebec, Canada. The race was the seventh round of the 2016 FIA Formula One World Championship and marked the fifty-third running of the Canadian Grand Prix as a round of the Formula One World Championship since the series' inception in 1950. The race was won by Lewis Hamilton. This was also Valtteri Bottas's last podium with Williams.

== Background ==
Daniil Kvyat and Marcus Ericsson both took three-place grid penalties for causing avoidable accidents during the previous race in Monaco. After heavily damaging his car in an accident during the Monaco Grand Prix, Renault prepared a brand new Renault R.S.16 chassis for Jolyon Palmer for the race.

Tyre supplier Pirelli made the soft, supersoft and ultrasoft tyres available to teams for the race. Renault and Haas chose radical tyre allocation strategies, with both teams avoiding the supersoft compound entirely.

This also marked the 100th race start for Force India driver Sergio Pérez.

== Race report ==
At the start Sebastian Vettel made a fast start to lead into the first corner ahead of the two Mercedes who touched slightly forcing Nico Rosberg off the track and Lewis Hamilton continued in 2nd place. However the race changed when a virtual safety car was deployed to remove Jenson Button's McLaren which had had an engine failure. Vettel pitted and lost out to Hamilton, Ferrari team principal Maurizio Arrivabene admitted later that the decision was "wrong". Hamilton won the race ahead of Vettel with Valtteri Bottas in the Williams claiming the final podium spot, Championship leader Rosberg could only manage 5th after suffering from a slow puncture and being forced to make an extra stop.

== Classification ==
=== Qualifying ===
Pos.	Car no.	Driver	Constructor	Qualifying times			Final grid
Pos.	Car no.	Driver	Constructor	Q1	Q2	Q3	Final grid
1	44	(United Kingdom) Lewis Hamilton	Mercedes	1:14.121	1:13.076	1:12.812	1
2	6	(Germany) Nico Rosberg	Mercedes	1:13.714	1:13.094	1:12.874	2
3	5	(Germany) Sebastian Vettel	Ferrari	1:13.925	1:13.857	1:12.990	3
4	3	(Australia) Daniel Ricciardo	Red Bull Racing-TAG Heuer	1:14.030	1:13.540	1:13.166	4
5	33	(Netherlands) Max Verstappen	Red Bull Racing-TAG Heuer	1:14.601	1:13.793	1:13.414	5
6	7	(Finland) Kimi Räikkönen	Ferrari	1:14.477	1:13.849	1:13.579	6
7	77	(Finland) Valtteri Bottas	Williams-Mercedes	1:14.389	1:13.791	1:13.670	7
8	19	(Brazil) Felipe Massa	Williams-Mercedes	1:14.815	1:13.864	1:13.769	8
9	27	(Germany) Nico Hülkenberg	Force India-Mercedes	1:14.663	1:14.166	1:13.952	9
10	14	(Spain) Fernando Alonso	McLaren-Honda	1:15.026	1:14.260	1:14.338	10
11	11	(Mexico) Sergio Pérez	Force India-Mercedes	1:14.814	1:14.317		11
12	22	(United Kingdom) Jenson Button	McLaren-Honda	1:14.755	1:14.437		12
13	26	(Russia) Daniil Kvyat	Toro Rosso-Ferrari	1:14.829	1:14.457		15^{1}
14	21	(Mexico) Esteban Gutiérrez	Haas-Ferrari	1:15.148	1:14.571		13
15	8	(France) Romain Grosjean	Haas-Ferrari	1:15.444	1:14.803		14
16	55	(Spain) Carlos Sainz Jr.	Toro Rosso-Ferrari	1:14.714	1:21.956		20^{5}
17	30	(United Kingdom) Jolyon Palmer	Renault	1:15.459			16
18	94	(Germany) Pascal Wehrlein	MRT-Mercedes	1:15.599			17
19	9	(Sweden) Marcus Ericsson	Sauber-Ferrari	1:15.635			21^{2}
20	12	(Brazil) Felipe Nasr	Sauber-Ferrari	1:16.663			18
21	88	(Indonesia) Rio Haryanto	MRT-Mercedes	1:17.052			19
107% time: 1:18.873
—	20	(Denmark) Kevin Magnussen	Renault	No time^{3}			22^{4}

Notes

- ^1 – Daniil Kvyat received a three-place grid penalty for causing an accident with Kevin Magnussen during the previous race in Monaco.
- ^2 – Marcus Ericsson received a three-place grid penalty for causing an accident with his teammate Felipe Nasr during the previous race in Monaco.
- ^3 – Kevin Magnussen failed to set a time within 107% of the fastest lap during Q1. As a result, his participation in the race came at the discretion of the stewards.
- ^4 – Kevin Magnussen received a five-place grid penalty for an unscheduled gearbox change.
- ^5 – Carlos Sainz Jr. received a five-place grid penalty for an unscheduled gearbox change.

=== Race ===
Pos.	No.	Driver	Constructor	Laps	Time/Retired	Grid	Points
1	44	(United Kingdom) Lewis Hamilton	Mercedes	70	1:31:05.296	1	25
2	5	(Germany) Sebastian Vettel	Ferrari	70	+5.011	3	18
3	77	(Finland) Valtteri Bottas	Williams-Mercedes	70	+46.422	7	15
4	33	(Netherlands) Max Verstappen	Red Bull Racing-TAG Heuer	70	+53.020	5	12
5	6	(Germany) Nico Rosberg	Mercedes	70	+1:02.093	2	10
6	7	(Finland) Kimi Räikkönen	Ferrari	70	+1:03.017	6	8
7	3	(Australia) Daniel Ricciardo	Red Bull Racing-TAG Heuer	70	+1:03.634	4	6
8	27	(Germany) Nico Hülkenberg	Force India-Mercedes	69	+1 Lap	9	4
9	55	(Spain) Carlos Sainz Jr.	Toro Rosso-Ferrari	69	+1 Lap	20	2
10	11	(Mexico) Sergio Pérez	Force India-Mercedes	69	+1 Lap	11	1
11	14	(Spain) Fernando Alonso	McLaren-Honda	69	+1 Lap	10	
12	26	(Russia) Daniil Kvyat	Toro Rosso-Ferrari	69	+1 Lap	15	
13	21	(Mexico) Esteban Gutiérrez	Haas-Ferrari	68	+2 Laps	13	
14	8	(France) Romain Grosjean	Haas-Ferrari	68	+2 Laps	14	
15	9	(Sweden) Marcus Ericsson	Sauber-Ferrari	68	+2 Laps	21	
16	20	(Denmark) Kevin Magnussen	Renault	68	+2 Laps	22	
17	94	(Germany) Pascal Wehrlein	MRT-Mercedes	68	+2 Laps	17	
18	12	(Brazil) Felipe Nasr	Sauber-Ferrari	68	+2 Laps	18	
19	88	(Indonesia) Rio Haryanto	MRT-Mercedes	68	+2 Laps	19	
Ret	19	(Brazil) Felipe Massa	Williams-Mercedes	35	Overheating	8	
Ret	30	(United Kingdom) Jolyon Palmer	Renault	16	Water leak	16	
Ret	22	(United Kingdom) Jenson Button	McLaren-Honda	9	Engine	12	

== Championship standings after the race ==
Drivers' Championship standings

	Pos.	Driver	Points
	1	(Germany) Nico Rosberg	116
	2	(United Kingdom) Lewis Hamilton	107
2	3	(Germany) Sebastian Vettel	78
1	4	(Australia) Daniel Ricciardo	72
1	5	(Finland) Kimi Räikkönen	69

Constructors' Championship standings

Pos.	Constructor	Points
1	(Germany) Mercedes	223
2	(Italy) Ferrari	147
3	(Austria) Red Bull Racing-TAG Heuer	130
4	(United Kingdom) Williams-Mercedes	81
5	Force India-Mercedes	42

- Note: Only the top five positions are included for both sets of standings.

Previous race: 2016 Monaco Grand Prix	FIA Formula One World Championship; 2016 season	Next race: 2016 European Grand Prix
Previous race: 2015 Canadian Grand Prix	Canadian Grand Prix	Next race: 2017 Canadian Grand Prix
