= 2016 Monaco Grand Prix =

2016 Formula One motor race

Race 6 of 21 in the 2016 Formula One World Championship
← Previous race	Next race →
- Layout of the Circuit de Monte Carlo, Monaco

Race details
- Date: 29 May 2016
- Official name: Formula 1 Grand Prix de Monaco 2016
- Location: Circuit de Monaco; La Condamine and Monte Carlo, Monaco
- Course: Street circuit
- Course length: 3.337 km (2.074 miles)
- Distance: 78 laps, 260.286 km (161.734 miles)
- Weather: Rainy at start, dry later 17–18 °C (63–64 °F) air temperature 20–22 °C (68–72 °F) track temperature 2 m/s (6.6 ft/s) wind from the north
- Attendance: 200,000 (Weekend)

Pole position
Driver	(Australia) Daniel Ricciardo	Red Bull Racing-TAG Heuer
- Time: 1:13.622

Fastest lap
Driver	(United Kingdom) Lewis Hamilton	Mercedes
- Time: 1:17.939 on lap 71

Podium
First	(United Kingdom) Lewis Hamilton	Mercedes
Second	(Australia) Daniel Ricciardo	Red Bull Racing-TAG Heuer
Third	(Mexico) Sergio Pérez	Force India-Mercedes

The 2016 Monaco Grand Prix (formally known as the Formula 1 Grand Prix de Monaco 2016) was a Formula One motor race held on 29 May 2016 at the Circuit de Monaco, a street circuit that runs through the Principality of Monaco. It was the sixth round of the 2016 FIA Formula One World Championship, and marked the seventy-fourth time that the Monaco Grand Prix had been held, as well as the sixty-third time it had been held as a round of the Formula One World Championship since the series inception in 1950.

Nico Rosberg was the defending race winner having won the past three Monaco Grands Prix in a row and entered the race with a thirty-nine-point lead held over Ferrari driver Kimi Räikkönen in the Drivers' Championship. Rosberg's team, Mercedes, held a 48-point lead over Ferrari in the Constructors' Championship.

During Saturday's qualifying, Daniel Ricciardo, who was driving for Red Bull Racing, achieved the first pole position of his career. In an eventful race, Mercedes's Lewis Hamilton took victory ahead of Ricciardo, who had lost time during a pitstop, when his engineers made a last second strategy call to swap to a different set of tyres while mechanics were already in the pit lane; as a result, the tyres arrived late to the car. Sergio Pérez completed the podium for Force India, the team's first appearance in the top three of the season and their first since the 2015 Russian Grand Prix.

== Background ==
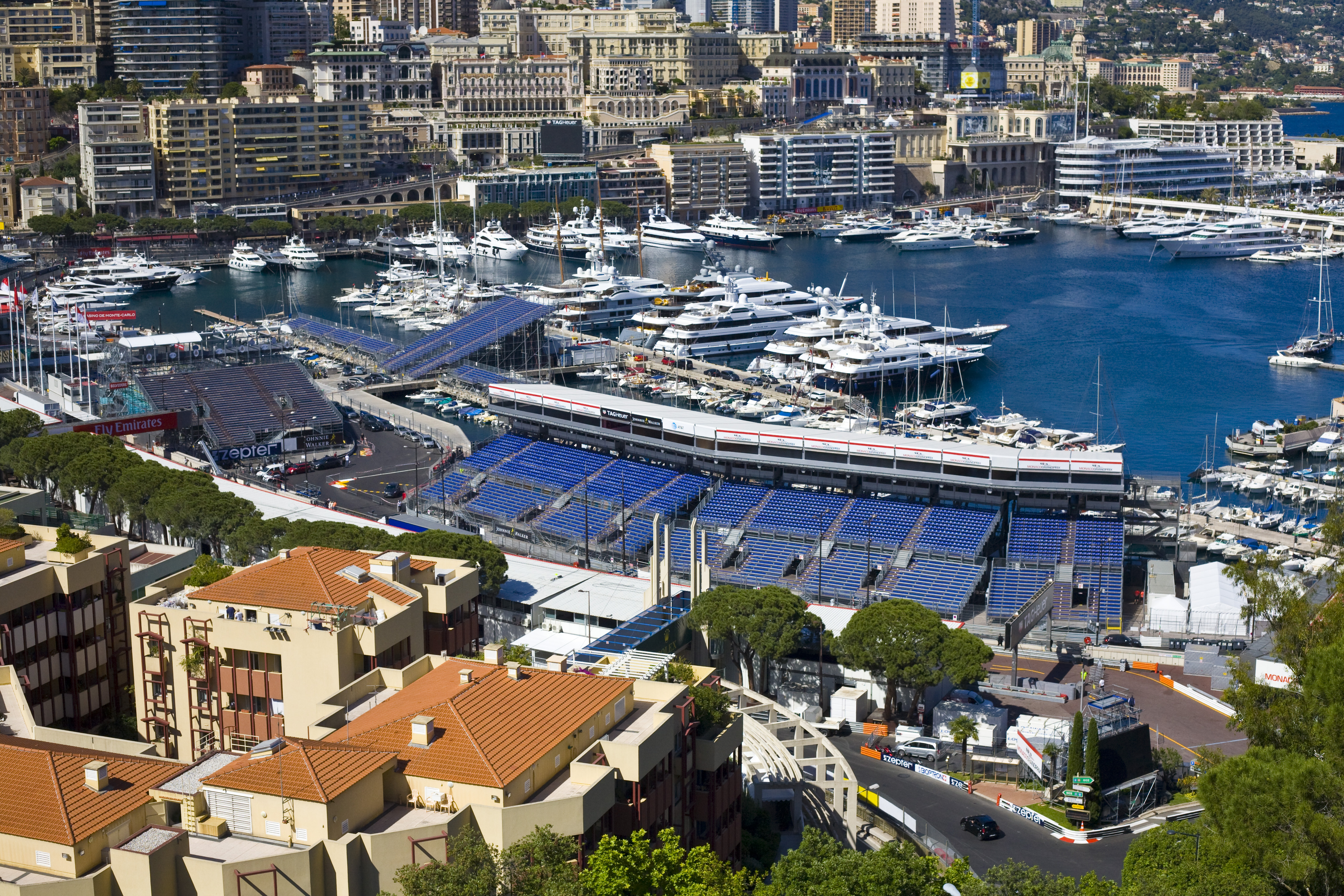
The swimming pool and Rascasse section of the track shortly before the race weekend

Following their controversial crash and double retirement at the previous race in Spain two weeks earlier, particular attention was on championship leaders Mercedes and their drivers Nico Rosberg and Lewis Hamilton. The team was adamant that such an incident could not be repeated, with their head of motorsport Toto Wolff saying: "We cannot afford to drop the ball, so we must remain united, remain strong and hit back hard this weekend." With a win, Rosberg would have been able to become the only driver other than Ayrton Senna to win the Monaco Grand Prix four times in a row, while Hamilton had suffered a string of bad results at the circuit, having won only once in 2008. At the race the year before, Hamilton had lost what he felt was a certain victory by a wrong decision to pit him during a safety car period.

Fernando Alonso received a new, revised combustion engine for his car, his third of five allowed over the course of the season without receiving a grid penalty. Power unit supplier Honda stressed that they had not used any development tokens, a set of limited allowed changes to the units, but had instead only improved reliability. The team also equipped both cars with new batteries and electronics control units, set to improve the reliability of the cars as well. During the two-day testing session that took place after the previous Grand Prix at the Circuit de Barcelona-Catalunya, Renault introduced an updated version of their power unit, which was used during the test to the satisfaction of driver Kevin Magnussen, who declared that the new unit was a step forward in both power and driveability. He urged the team to pull the introduction of the power unit forward to the Monaco race, instead of the following Grand Prix in Canada as originally planned. Renault chose to do so, however, they were only able to hand out one updated unit to both their works team and Red Bull, who used them under the name TAG Heuer. The two units were eventually given to Magnussen at Renault and Daniel Ricciardo at Red Bull.

The race saw the competitive début of Pirelli's new ultrasoft tyre compound, which was provided alongside the supersoft and soft compounds. Per the regulations of the 2016 season, every driver needs to set aside one set each of the two softest compounds for the race and one set of the ultrasofts for Q3 (should they advance). The drivers have freedom of what other compounds they choose for the remaining ten out of thirteen sets. From this race onwards, the Fédération Internationale de l'Automobile allowed drivers to choose alternative helmet designs for one race weekend per season, a practice usually prohibited as they have to wear the same design to make them more recognisable to spectators and television audiences. As a consequence, Felipe Massa's helmet featured extensive artwork by graffiti artist Os Gêmeos, teammate Valtteri Bottas featured casino-inspired imagery and Haas driver Romain Grosjean sported a tribute to the late Jules Bianchi on his helmet. The race marked a reason for celebration at McLaren, as the team had started their first ever Grand Prix at Monaco fifty years earlier.

Going into the weekend, Nico Rosberg led the Drivers' Championship with 100 points, followed by Ferrari's Kimi Räikkönen with 61 points. Lewis Hamilton followed in third, a further four points behind, with Sebastian Vettel in fourth with 48 points, level with Daniel Ricciardo in fifth. In the constructors' standings, Mercedes led with 157 points, 48 points ahead of Ferrari, with Red Bull Racing in third with 94 points.

== Free practice ==
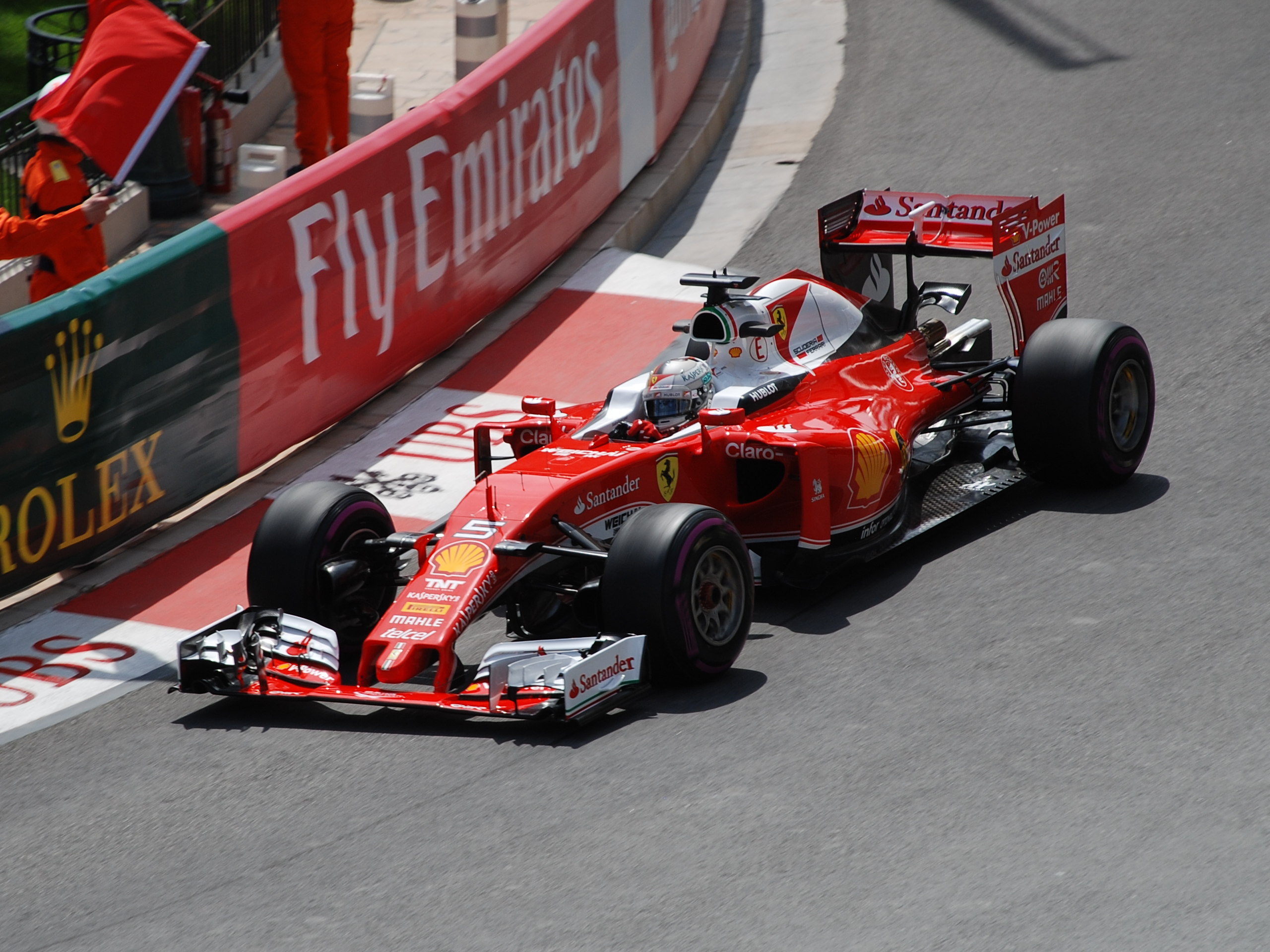
Sebastian Vettel was fastest in third practice.

Per the regulations for the 2016 season, two ninety-minute practice and one sixty-minute session were held before qualifying on Saturday. The first two usually take place on Friday, with Monaco being the single exemption, where those sessions are held on Thursday, in order to minimise road-closure disruptions to local residents. In the first session on Thursday morning, Lewis Hamilton topped the timesheets with a time of 1:15.537, one tenth of a second faster than his teammate Nico Rosberg. They were followed by Sebastian Vettel, almost half a second down on Hamilton, and the two Red Bull cars of Daniel Ricciardo and Max Verstappen respectively. Daniil Kvyat, driving for Toro Rosso, in sixth was the last driver to get within a second of Hamilton's time. He was the only one of the front runners to set his time on the supersoft instead of the faster ultrasoft tyres. There were several incidents during the session: After twenty-four minutes, Felipe Massa hit the barrier in turn one, damaging his car and leading to a virtual safety car (VSC) period. Later, Lewis Hamilton had a brake lockup at the same spot, but was able to get into the run-off area without touching the guardrail. Several other drivers had dangerous moments in turn one as well, but the most severe incident of the session came three minutes to the end: A drain cover had come loose around the first corner, puncturing Rosberg's left rear tyre and damaging Jenson Button's McLaren MP4-31, causing the practice to be red flagged, ultimately ending the session.

In second practice on Thursday afternoon, Ricciardo was fastest, setting a time of 1:14.607, more than half a second clear of Hamilton in second place. Rosberg and Verstappen, in third and fourth, were the only other drivers to get within a second of Ricciardo, while the two Williams drivers Valtteri Bottas and Felipe Massa struggled, ending the session 14th and 16th respectively. At Ferrari, Kimi Räikkönen was fastest in seventh spot. His teammate, Vettel, had an incident-packed session that eventually ended with him setting the ninth fastest time. He spun at Mirabeau corner, damaging his rear wing, only to hit the wall in turn one after coming back to the track, albeit continuing with wheel rim damage. A VSC period occurred after Romain Grosjean crashed into the outside barrier at the exit of the tunnel. Two more VSC periods ensued when Rio Haryanto touched the inside barrier at the same spot and later after Kevin Magnussen crashed at the final corner.

In the third practice session on Saturday morning, Sebastian Vettel set the fastest time, about one hundredth of a second faster than Hamilton. Nico Rosberg and Daniel Ricciardo followed, both also within two tenth of a second of Vettel. Max Verstappen was fifth fastest although he had a minor crash coming up to Casino square, clipping the wall. Toro Rosso were again quick, getting both drivers into the top ten. Renault had different fortunes, as both drivers had accidents, with Jolyon Palmer hindering one of Hamilton's flying laps as he crashed at the swimming pool section.

== Qualifying ==
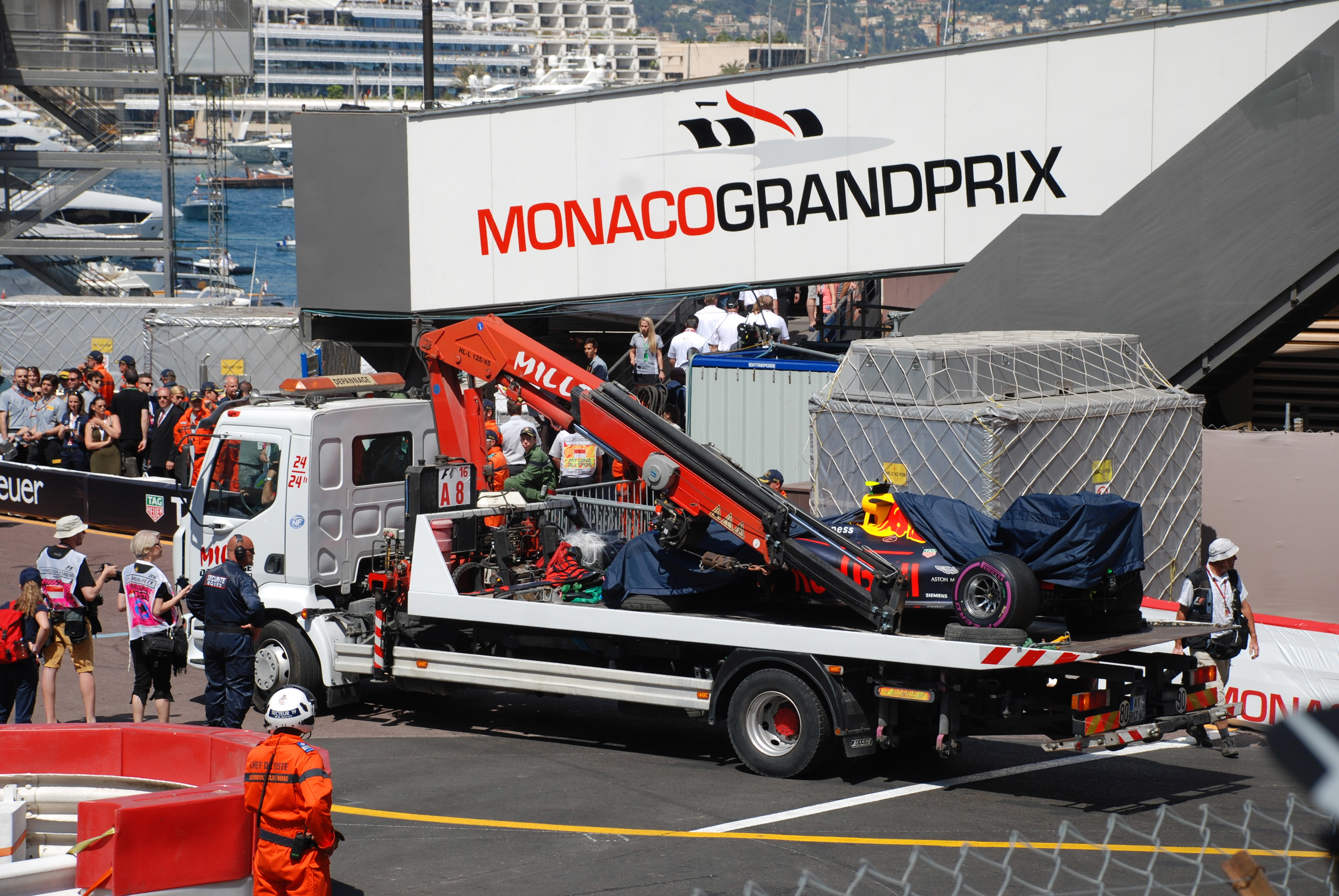
The wreckage of Max Verstappen's car is cleared off the track.

Qualifying consisted of three parts, 18, 15 and 12 minutes in length respectively, with six drivers eliminated from competing after each of the first two sessions. In the first part of qualifying (Q1), the session got interrupted shortly after it had started, as Felipe Nasr came to a halt at the exit of the tunnel, caused by an engine failure. A red flag came out while the car was cleared off the track. When the running resumed, all drivers except for the two at Force India went out on the ultrasoft tyres to set their first lap times. Max Verstappen was the last to set a representative time, but touched the guardrail at the swimming pool chicane and crashed into the wall, causing another red flag period. As the session got back under way, it were the two Manor cars of Rio Haryanto and Pascal Wehrlein, as well as Jolyon Palmer and Marcus Ericsson who joined Nasr and Verstappen on the sidelines, as they were eliminated. Kevin Magnussen meanwhile barely made it into Q2, but was under investigation for exiting the pit lane while it was closed.

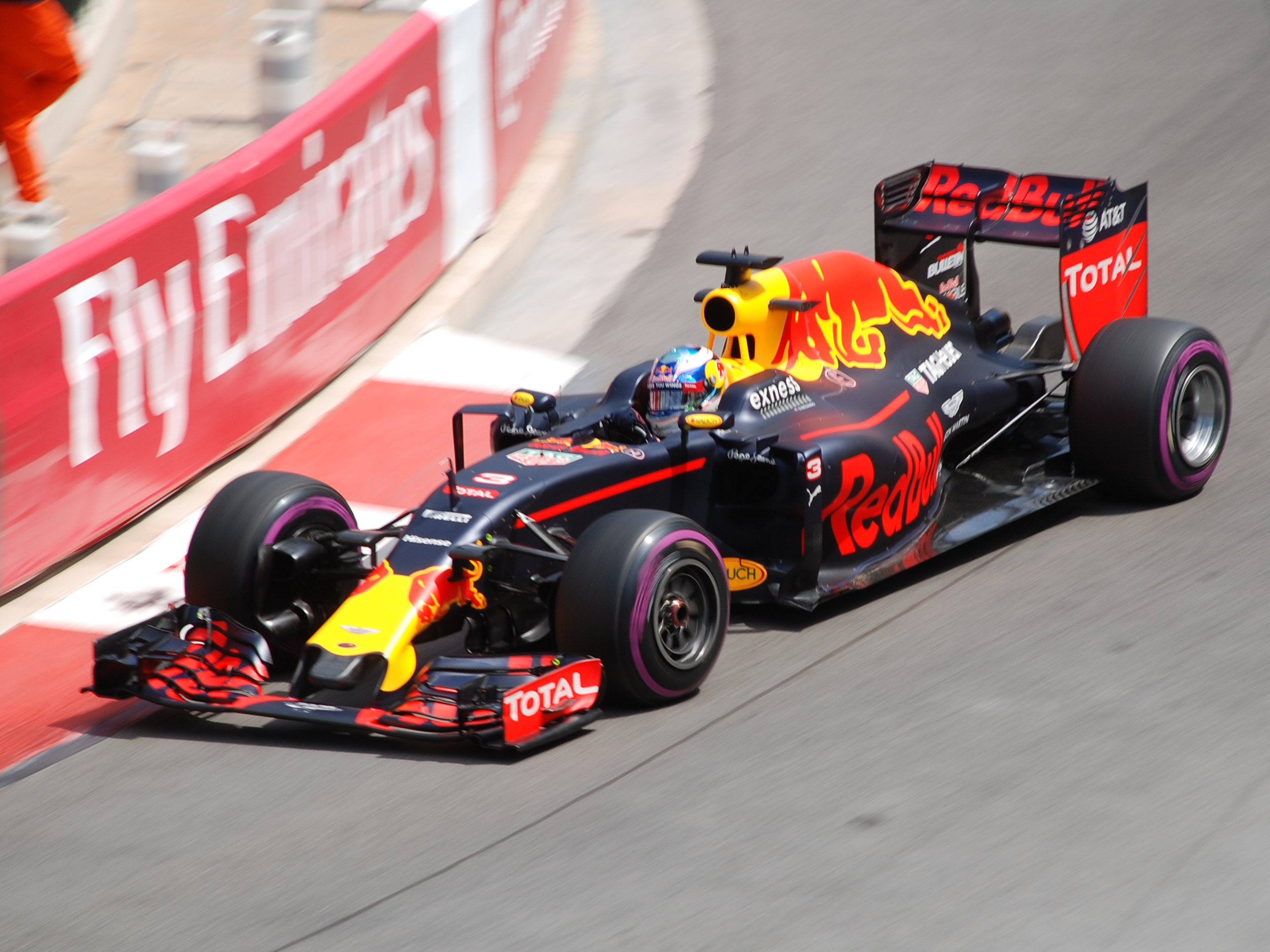
Daniel Ricciardo achieved the first pole position of his career.

In the second part, Lewis Hamilton quickly set a fast lap time, the quickest of the weekend up to that point, about half a second ahead of his teammate Rosberg. Meanwhile, Daniel Ricciardo set his fastest lap on the harder supersoft compound tyre, meaning that he would be able to start the race on them, should it have stayed dry. On the back end, Williams struggled for pace and both Valtteri Bottas and Felipe Massa missed out on Q3 by qualifying 11th and 14th respectively. Also eliminated were Esteban Gutiérrez, Jenson Button, Romain Grosjean and Magnussen.

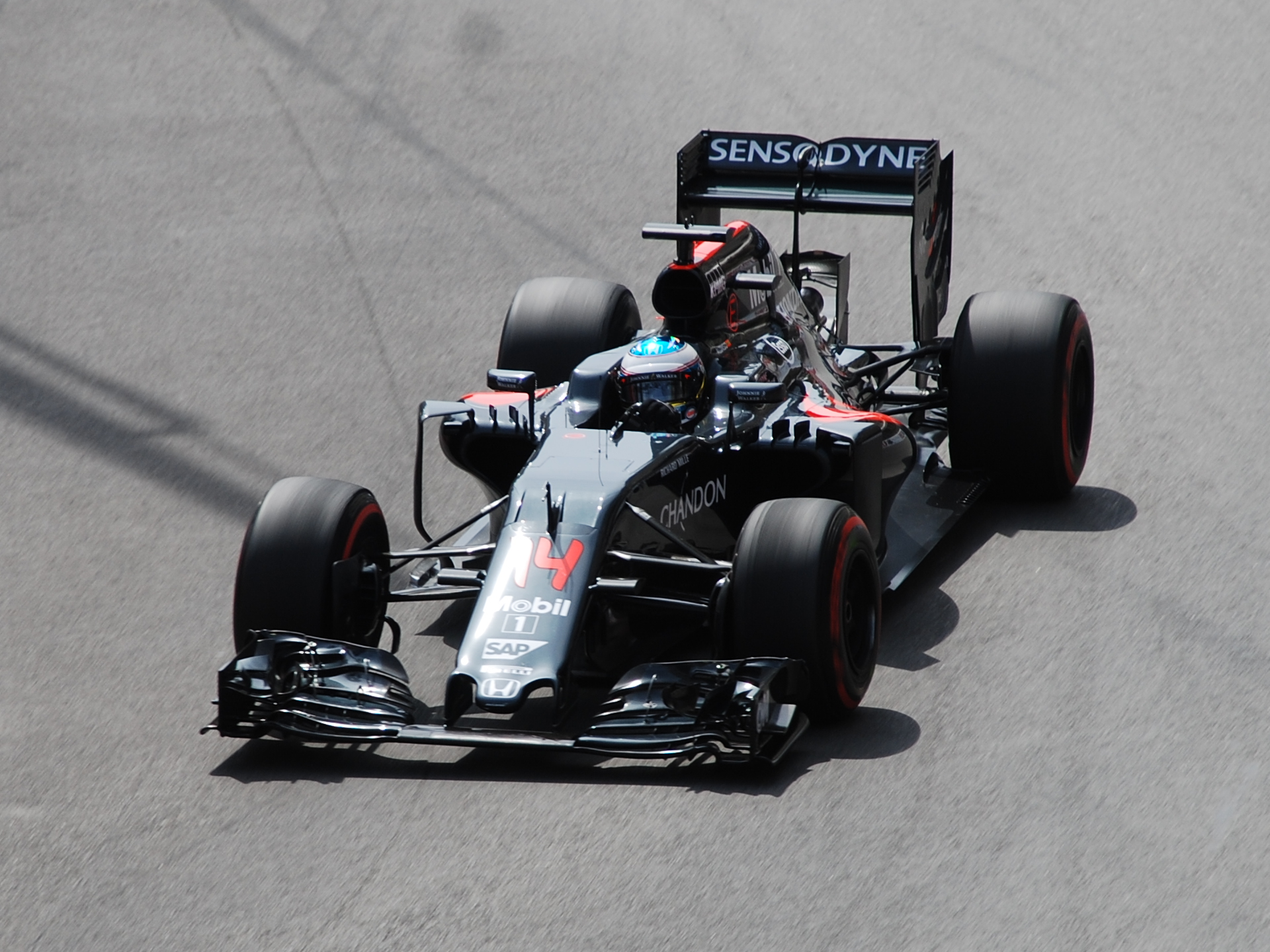
Fernando Alonso advanced into the final part of qualifying and was able to finish fifth in the race.

As Q3 started, Lewis Hamilton stopped in the pit lane with a loss of power and was pushed back into the garage. He was eventually able to go on track and qualified third, after starting several quick laps only to abandon them to leave his final run to the last moment. He was however beaten to pole position by Ricciardo, who was almost two-tenths of a second faster than second placed Rosberg, with Vettel following in fourth almost a second slower. Nico Hülkenberg managed fifth ahead of Kimi Räikkönen, who was to serve a five-place grid penalty for an unscheduled gearbox change, leaving him eleventh on the grid. Carlos Sainz Jr., Sergio Pérez, Daniil Kvyat and Fernando Alonso rounded up the top ten. Ricciardo's pole position was the first for a Renault-powered turbocharged car since Ayrton Senna's front-of-the-grid start at the 1986 Mexican Grand Prix for Lotus. (Note: However, this result will not be recorded for Renault, as Red Bull ran the Renault-provided power units under the TAG Heuer moniker.)

=== Post-qualifying ===
After qualifying, the race stewards decided not to give a penalty to Magnussen for ignoring the red light at the end of the pit lane during Q1, since it had only changed to red 0.55 seconds before he crossed the pit exit line. Kvyat escaped penalty as well after his car failed the obligatory front floor deflection test. As the team pointed out, the irregularity was the result of an impact on track, allowing him to keep eighth on the grid.

=== Qualifying classification ===
Pos.	Car no.	Driver	Constructor	Qualifying times			Final grid
Pos.	Car no.	Driver	Constructor	Q1	Q2	Q3	Final grid
1	3	(Australia) Daniel Ricciardo	Red Bull Racing-TAG Heuer	1:14.912	1:14.357	1:13.622	1
2	6	(Germany) Nico Rosberg	Mercedes	1:14.873	1:14.043	1:13.791	2
3	44	(United Kingdom) Lewis Hamilton	Mercedes	1:14.826	1:14.056	1:13.942	3
4	5	(Germany) Sebastian Vettel	Ferrari	1:14.610	1:14.318	1:14.552	4
5	27	(Germany) Nico Hülkenberg	Force India-Mercedes	1:15.333	1:14.989	1:14.726	5
6	7	(Finland) Kimi Räikkönen	Ferrari	1:15.499	1:14.789	1:14.732	11^{1}
7	55	(Spain) Carlos Sainz Jr.	Toro Rosso-Ferrari	1:15.467	1:14.805	1:14.749	6
8	11	(Mexico) Sergio Pérez	Force India-Mercedes	1:15.328	1:14.937	1:14.902	7
9	26	(Russia) Daniil Kvyat	Toro Rosso-Ferrari	1:15.384	1:14.794	1:15.273	8
10	14	(Spain) Fernando Alonso	McLaren-Honda	1:15.504	1:15.107	1:15.363	9
11	77	(Finland) Valtteri Bottas	Williams-Mercedes	1:15.521	1:15.273		10
12	21	(Mexico) Esteban Gutiérrez	Haas-Ferrari	1:15.592	1:15.293		12
13	22	(United Kingdom) Jenson Button	McLaren-Honda	1:15.554	1:15.352		13
14	19	(Brazil) Felipe Massa	Williams-Mercedes	1:15.710	1:15.385		14
15	8	(France) Romain Grosjean	Haas-Ferrari	1:15.465	1:15.571		15
16	20	(Denmark) Kevin Magnussen	Renault	1:16.253	1:16.058		16
17	9	(Sweden) Marcus Ericsson	Sauber-Ferrari	1:16.299			17
18	30	(United Kingdom) Jolyon Palmer	Renault	1:16.586			18
19	88	(Indonesia) Rio Haryanto	MRT-Mercedes	1:17.295			19
20	94	(Germany) Pascal Wehrlein	MRT-Mercedes	1:17.452			20
107% time: 1:19.832
—	33	(Netherlands) Max Verstappen	Red Bull Racing-TAG Heuer	1:22.467			PL^{2}
—	12	(Brazil) Felipe Nasr	Sauber-Ferrari	No time			PL^{2}

Notes

- ^1 – Kimi Räikkönen received a five-place grid penalty for an unscheduled gearbox change.
- ^2 – Felipe Nasr and Max Verstappen failed to set a time within 107% of the fastest lap during Q1. They had to apply to the stewards for permission to start the race. Both opted to start the race from the pit lane. Verstappen started in front, as he had set a time in qualifying, ahead of Nasr, who did not set a time.

== Race ==
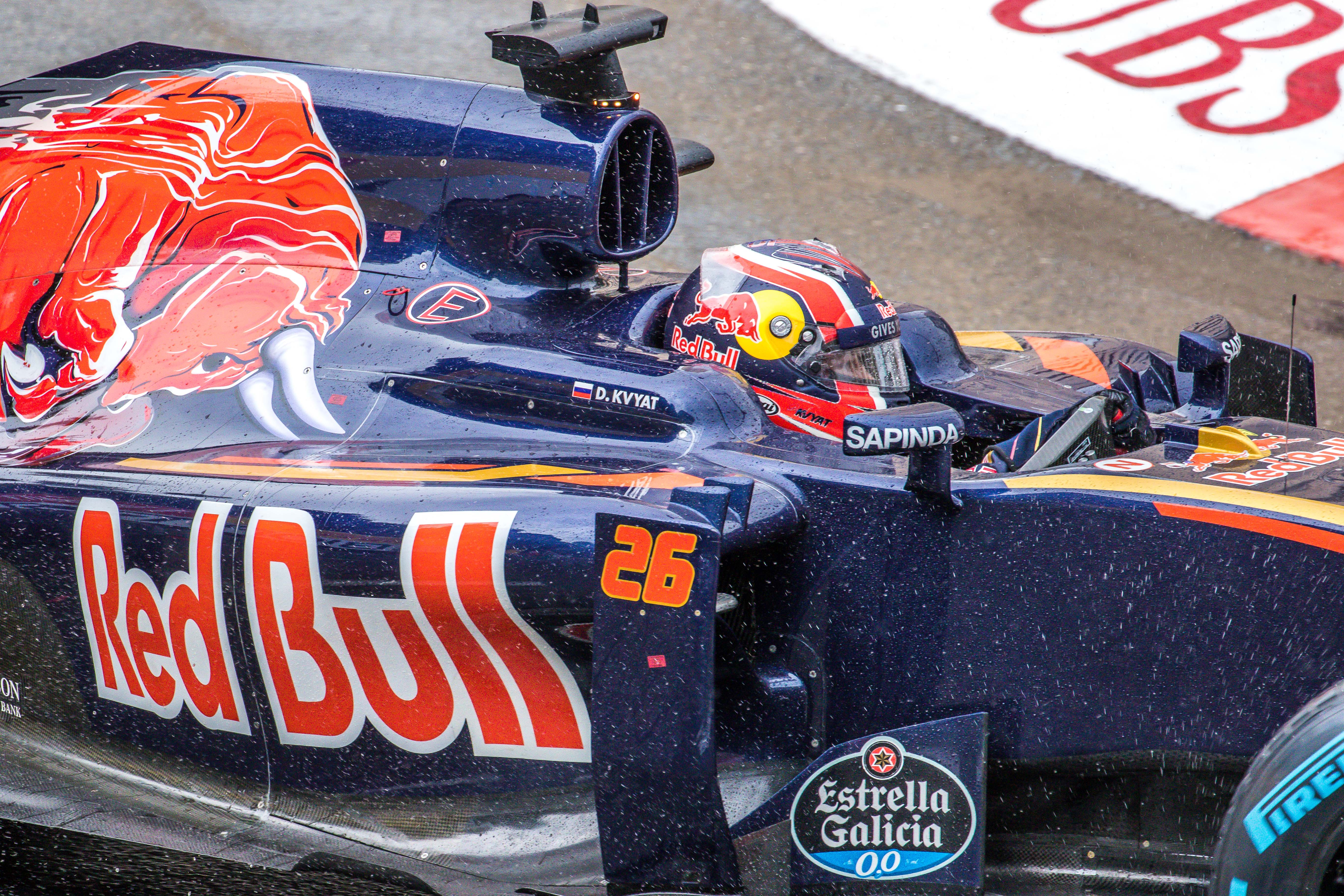
Daniil Kvyat had electrical problems early in the race and later retired after a collision.

With rain shortly before the race, the start was taken behind the safety car, forcing all drivers to start the race on the full wet tyres. As Ricciardo led the field behind the safety car, Daniil Kvyat had to come into the pit lane on lap two, complaining of technical issues. He rejoined with a new steering wheel, being a lap down on the rest of the pack already. The race started in earnest on lap seven, with Ricciardo defending his lead at the restart. Kevin Magnussen made a pit stop for intermediate tyres at the end of the lap, but his teammate Jolyon Palmer proved just how slippery it still was when he crashed out just a lap later, being caught out by a wet zebra crossing and causing a virtual safety car period. More cars came into the pitlane for intermediate tyres over the following laps. On lap eleven, Kimi Räikkönen damaged his front wing on the guardrail at the Loews hairpin, resulting in his front wing getting caught under his front tyres, blocking Grosjean's way in the process. Räikkönen retired some corners later. Meanwhile, Ricciardo built a gap at the front, being ten seconds clear of Rosberg on lap 13. One lap later, Sebastian Vettel was the first of the front runners to change to intermediate tyres. Mercedes issued team orders demanding Rosberg let Hamilton past on lap 16, but the gap had by then grown to 13 seconds.

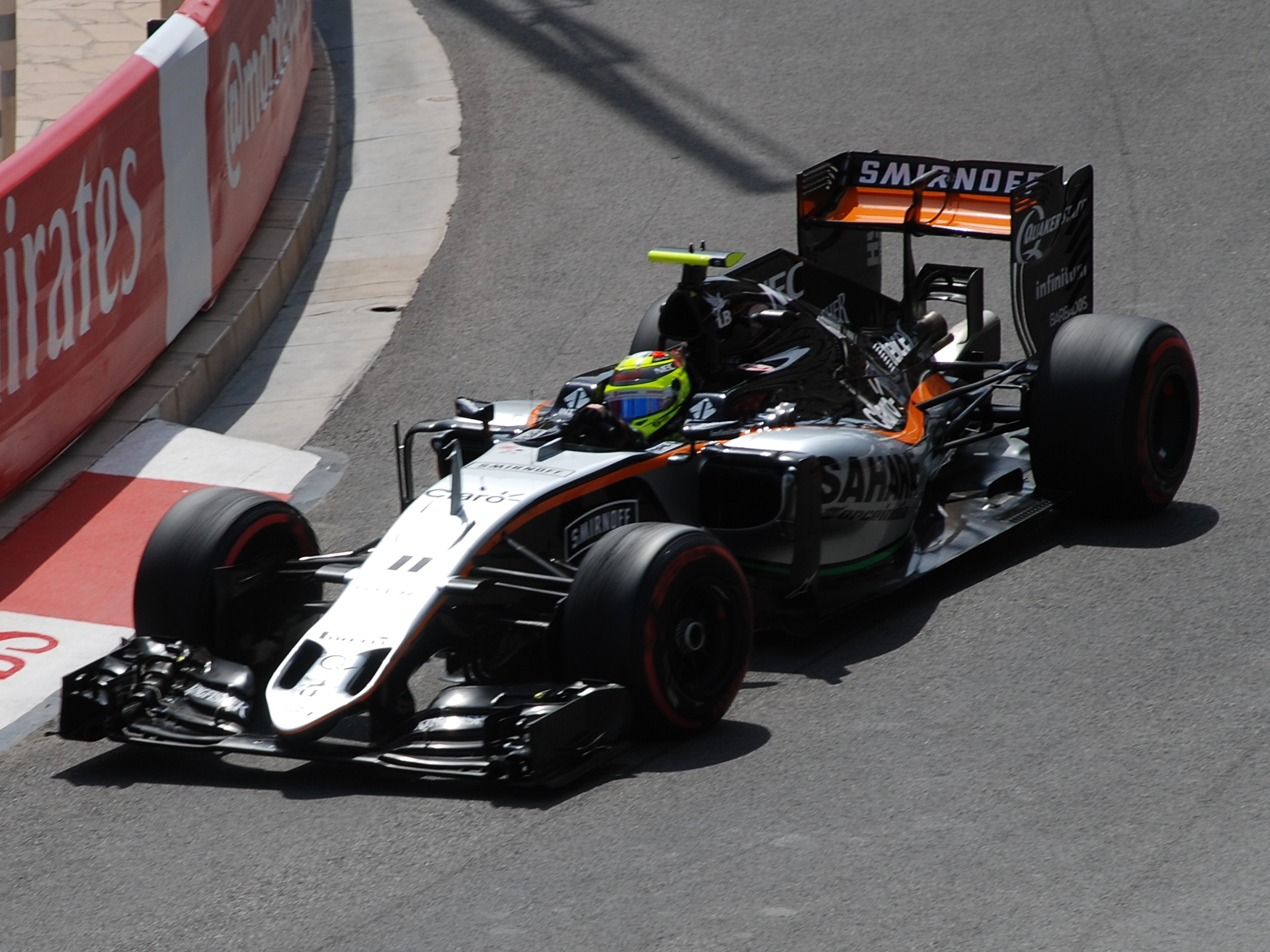
Sergio Pérez recorded Force India's first podium finish of the season in third.

On lap 21, Rosberg made a pit stop for the intermediate tyres, leaving only Ricciardo and Hamilton at the front of the field on the full wet tyres. Ricciardo made the switch on lap 24, but Hamilton stayed out, opting to remain on the wet tyre until the track dried out enough to go straight to slicks. In the meantime, Verstappen had fought his way back into the top ten, after having started 21st. In the subsequent laps, Ricciardo was able to reduce the gap to Hamilton in the lead, producing fastest laps on inters, edging as close as half a second by lap 28. Behind the leading pair, Rosberg was third ahead of Pérez and Vettel. The pivotal moment of the race followed on lap 31, with Hamilton finally changing to slick tyres. When Ricciardo followed suit a lap later, his pit crew was in position to equip a set of soft compound tyres. However, the race engineers had requested super soft compound tyres. Ricciardo was then forced to wait for over 10 seconds while his crew scrambled to fetch the correct tyres from their location at the back of the garage. Hamilton capitalised on Ricciardo's long stop, taking the lead and defending it for the remainder of the race. Sergio Pérez was another driver who benefited during the second round of stops, emerging in third. Rosberg was left in sixth after both Vettel and Alonso also came out ahead of him after the switch to dry tyres. On lap 34, Ricciardo made an attempt to repass Hamilton on track, but Hamilton successfully defended his position.

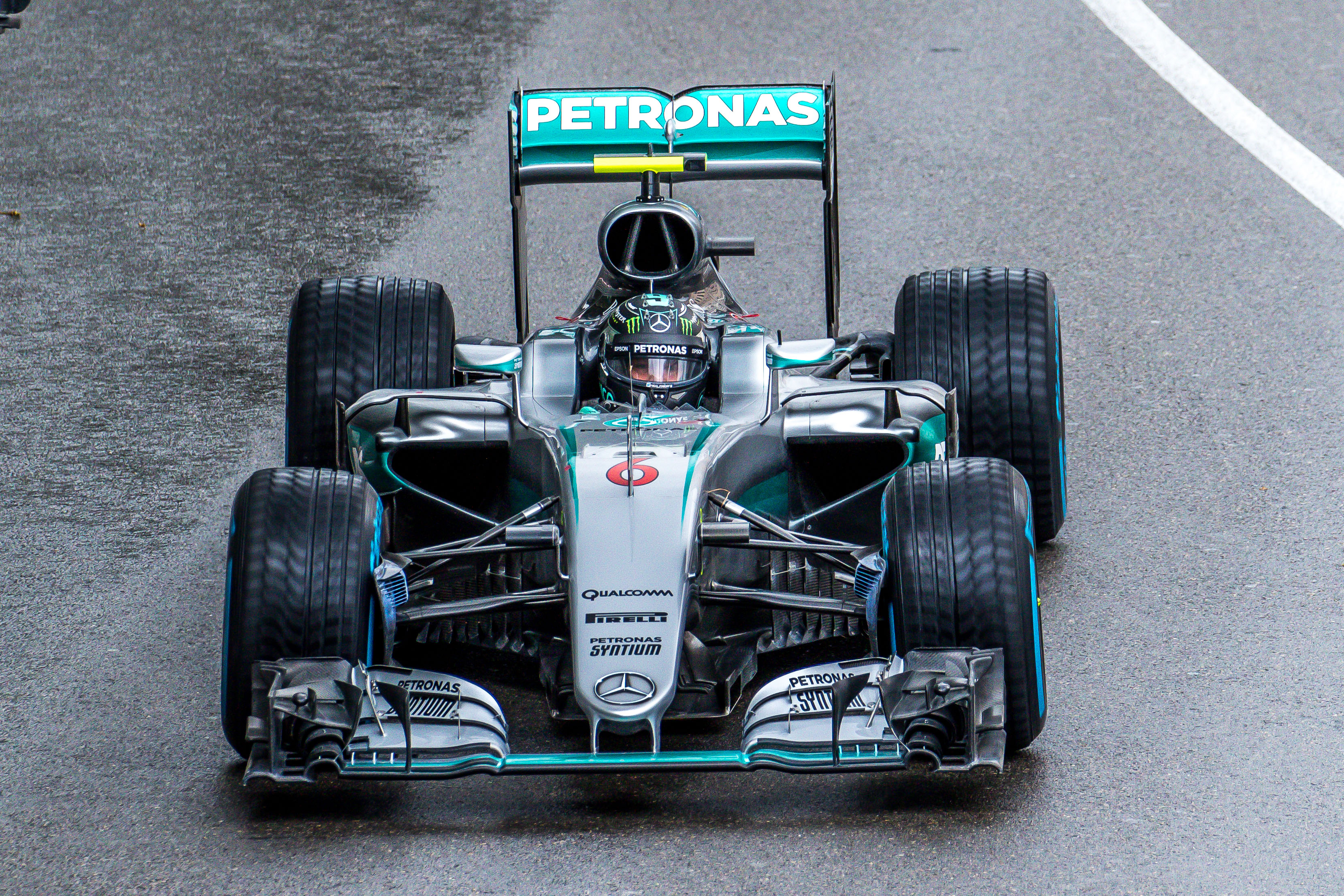
Nico Rosberg started on the front row, but fell to seventh in the race with brake problems.

Another virtual safety car period ensued on lap 35, caused by Verstappen who crashed his car into the barrier after locking up his tyres. As the VSC ended on lap 37, Ricciardo once more failed in an attempt to regain the lead. At the chicane coming out of the tunnel, Hamilton misjudged the corner and backed Ricciardo off at the exit of the chicane, causing the latter to complain about the move on team radio. While the incident was investigated by the stewards, the decision was not to take action against Hamilton. At that point, the order stood as follows: Hamilton, Ricciardo, Pérez, Vettel, Alonso, Rosberg, Hülkenberg, Sainz, Button and Gutiérrez. The top four drivers pulled away cleanly from the rest of the field behind them. On lap 50, the two Sauber cars collided at Rascasse corner, after Felipe Nasr had ignored instructions from the pit lane to let his teammate Ericsson behind him pass. Another VSC period was called while both Sauber drivers made pit stops to repair damages, only for both to retire some laps later. In front, the race carried on in the same order. On lap 68, the fourth virtual safety car period occurred when a large plastic sheet fell onto the start–finish straight. Hamilton was able to extend his lead over Ricciardo at that point, setting the fastest lap of the race on lap 71. Three laps from the finish, rain started to fall again, although no driver changed tyres before the chequered flag fell. Hamilton crossed the finish line to take victory ahead of Ricciardo and Pérez. This win for Hamilton marked his second at Monaco, the other being in 2008. Vettel hung on to fourth, followed by Alonso in fifth. Rosberg lost his sixth place to Nico Hülkenberg on the very last lap.

=== Post-race ===
At the podium interviews, conducted by Sky Sports F1 commentator Martin Brundle (who had suffered a heart attack whilst running to do the podium interviews), Hamilton thanked his team and expressed satisfaction about how the race went. He pointed to the problems of driving on the full wet tyres for such a long distance, saying that they were about to "drop off", meaning to lose much of their grip to the race surface, when he came in to change. He complimented Ricciardo on driving "phenomenally all weekend". Ricciardo himself lamented his misfortune in losing the race during his second pit stop. In regard to his team's error and their different strategy at the previous race in Spain, which he felt had cost him a chance at victory there as well, he said: "Two weekends in a row I've been screwed now. It sucks. It hurts." He emphasised that it had not been his decision to pit at that time, but that the team had called him in and criticised them for not being ready when he arrived. Sergio Pérez on the other hand was "extremely happy" with the performance by him and the team, saying that the race was his favourite podium finish while driving for Force India.

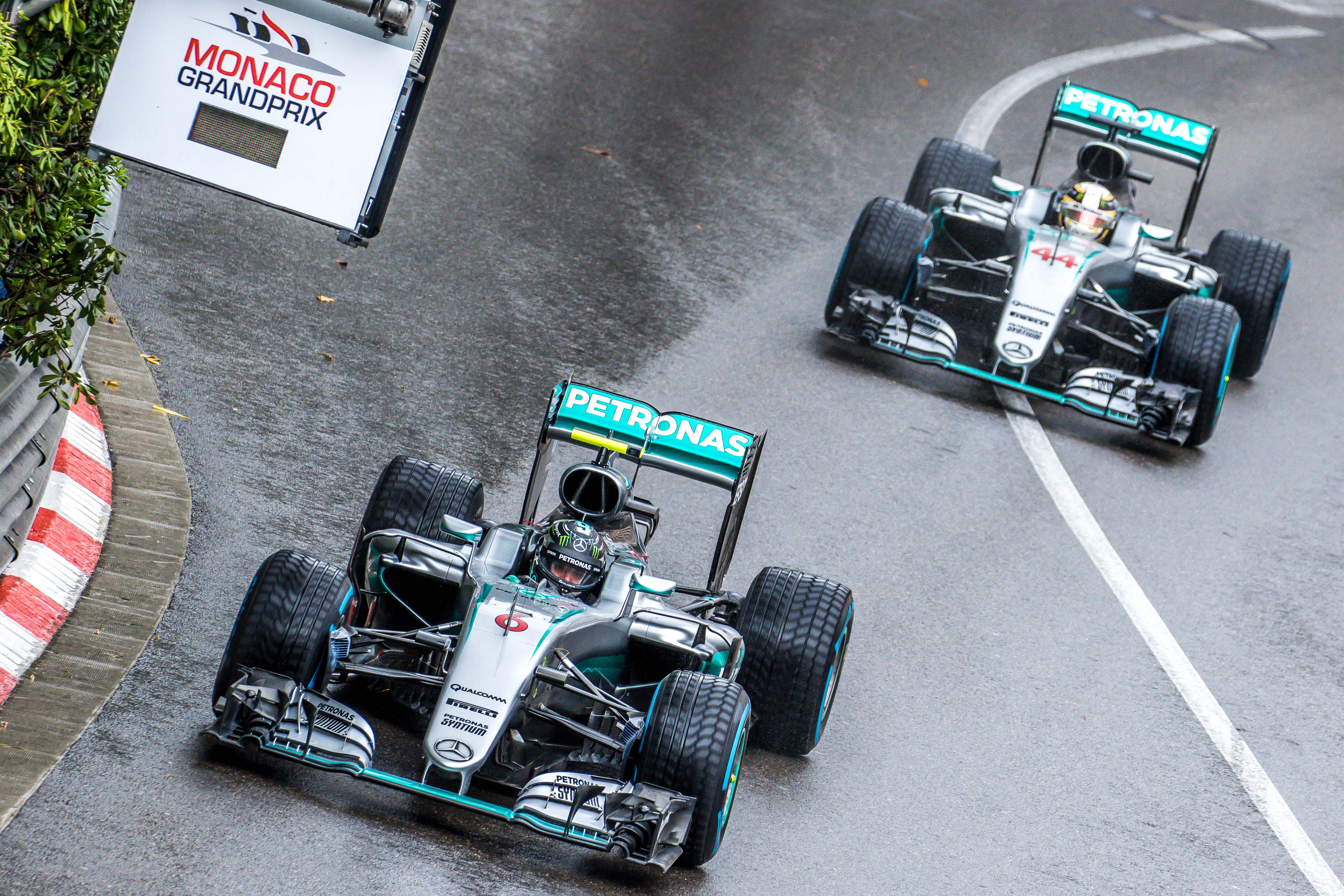
Lewis Hamilton (background) thanked teammate Nico Rosberg for letting him pass.

Speaking about the moment when Nico Rosberg let him past in the early stages of the race, Hamilton told the press that he had thanked his teammate for "being a gentleman". When asked how painful it had been to be asked to let Hamilton go by, Rosberg said: "It was more painful the feeling that I had in the car. That was the worst. Around Monaco, that's not a nice feeling to have. I had no confidence at all. The second thing [team order] was just a consequence of that." Mercedes's motorsport director Toto Wolff also praised Rosberg for working for the team and moving to the side without questioning the team's decision. Rosberg was however unable to give an explanation for his slow pace during the early stages. He pointed to the possibility that his car's tyre and brake temperatures had been particularly affected by the period behind the safety car.

Following their intra-team collision, Sauber's team principal Monisha Kaltenborn put blame on both drivers. The stewards penalised Ericsson for the incident, handing him a three-place grid penalty for the following race in Canada as well as three penalty points to his licence. Felipe Nasr was adamant that the team orders he had received prior to the accident had been uncalled for, since his slower pace was due to low tyre temperatures. He also claimed that Ericsson had ignored team orders himself on two occasions in the previous season. Ericsson in turn had a different view and said that the team had told him for "seven or eight laps" that they would swap the positions of the drivers before he decided to go for the pass himself. Valtteri Bottas and Pascal Wehrlein also received penalties during and after the race. Bottas was handed a ten-second time penalty and two penalty points on his licence for causing a collision with Gutiérrez, while Wehrlein received two separate ten-second penalties: the first for exceeding the allowed lap time under VSC conditions and the second for ignoring blue flags. He was also given two penalty points each for both incidents.

Following the Grand Prix, Nico Rosberg retained first place in the Drivers' Championship with 106 points, but his lead over the second-placed driver, now Hamilton, had decreased to 24 points. Daniel Ricciardo moved up to third with 66 points, five points ahead of Räikkönen. In the Constructors' standings, Mercedes extended their lead over Ferrari to 67 points, with Red Bull in third another nine points behind.

=== Race classification ===
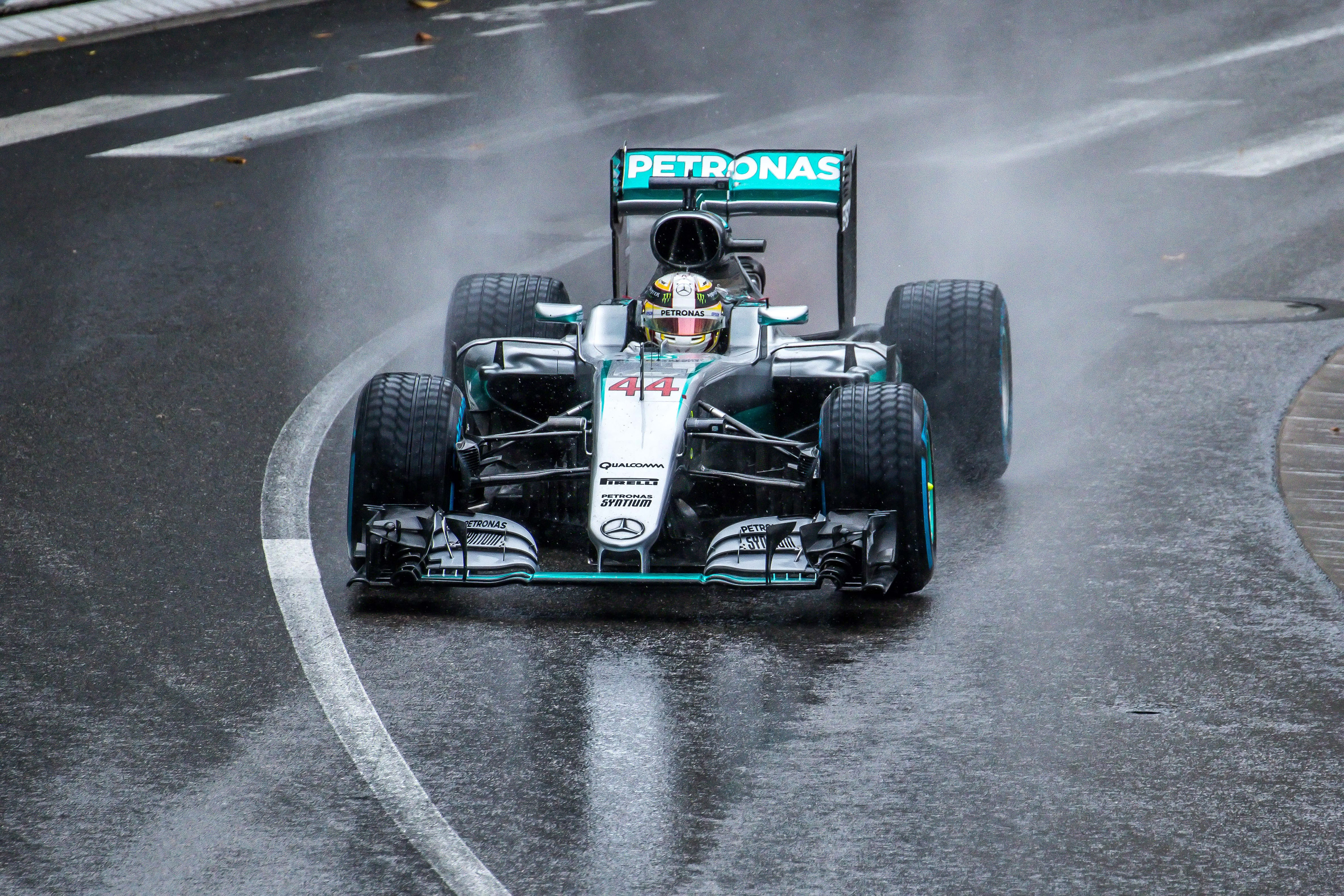
Lewis Hamilton won the race for Mercedes.

Pos.	No.	Driver	Constructor	Laps	Time/Retired	Grid	Pts.
1	44	(United Kingdom) Lewis Hamilton	Mercedes	78	1:59:29.133	3	25
2	3	(Australia) Daniel Ricciardo	Red Bull Racing-TAG Heuer	78	+7.252	1	18
3	11	(Mexico) Sergio Pérez	Force India-Mercedes	78	+13.825	7	15
4	5	(Germany) Sebastian Vettel	Ferrari	78	+15.846	4	12
5	14	(Spain) Fernando Alonso	McLaren-Honda	78	+1:25.076	9	10
6	27	(Germany) Nico Hülkenberg	Force India-Mercedes	78	+1:32.999	5	8
7	6	(Germany) Nico Rosberg	Mercedes	78	+1:33.290	2	6
8	55	(Spain) Carlos Sainz Jr.	Toro Rosso-Ferrari	77	+1 Lap	6	4
9	22	(United Kingdom) Jenson Button	McLaren-Honda	77	+1 Lap	13	2
10	19	(Brazil) Felipe Massa	Williams-Mercedes	77	+1 Lap	14	1
11	21	(Mexico) Esteban Gutiérrez	Haas-Ferrari	77	+1 Lap	12	
12^{1}	77	(Finland) Valtteri Bottas	Williams-Mercedes	77	+1 Lap	10	
13	8	(France) Romain Grosjean	Haas-Ferrari	76	+2 Laps	15	
14	94	(Germany) Pascal Wehrlein	MRT-Mercedes	76	+2 Laps^{2}	20	
15	88	(Indonesia) Rio Haryanto	MRT-Mercedes	74	+4 Laps	19	
Ret	9	(Sweden) Marcus Ericsson	Sauber-Ferrari	51	Collision damage	17	
Ret	12	(Brazil) Felipe Nasr	Sauber-Ferrari	48	Collision damage	PL	
Ret	33	(Netherlands) Max Verstappen	Red Bull Racing-TAG Heuer	34	Accident	PL	
Ret	20	(Denmark) Kevin Magnussen	Renault	32	Collision damage	16	
Ret	26	(Russia) Daniil Kvyat	Toro Rosso-Ferrari	18	Collision/Electrical	8	
Ret	7	(Finland) Kimi Räikkönen	Ferrari	10	Accident damage	11	
Ret	30	(United Kingdom) Jolyon Palmer	Renault	7	Accident	18	

Notes

- ^1 – Valtteri Bottas originally finished 11th, but received a ten-second time penalty after the race for causing a collision with Esteban Gutiérrez.
- ^2 – Pascal Wehrlein received a ten-second time penalty for ignoring blue flags, and another ten-second time penalty for speeding under the virtual safety car.

== Championship standings after the race ==
Drivers' Championship standings

	Pos.	Driver	Points
	1	(Germany) Nico Rosberg	106
1	2	(United Kingdom) Lewis Hamilton	82
2	3	(Australia) Daniel Ricciardo	66
2	4	(Finland) Kimi Räikkönen	61
1	5	(Germany) Sebastian Vettel	60

Constructors' Championship standings

	Pos.	Constructor	Points
	1	(Germany) Mercedes	188
	2	(Italy) Ferrari	121
	3	(Austria) Red Bull Racing-TAG Heuer	112
	4	(United Kingdom) Williams-Mercedes	66
2	5	Force India-Mercedes	37

- Note: Only the top five positions are included for both sets of standings.

== See also ==
- 2016 Monaco GP2 Series round

== Notes ==
Previous race: 2016 Spanish Grand Prix	FIA Formula One World Championship; 2016 season	Next race: 2016 Canadian Grand Prix
Previous race: 2015 Monaco Grand Prix	Monaco Grand Prix	Next race: 2017 Monaco Grand Prix
